= List of monastic houses in County Monaghan =

The smaller establishments such as monastic cells and notable monastic granges (particularly those with resident monks) and camerae of the military orders of monks (Knights Templars and Knights Hospitallers) are included. The numerous monastic hospitals per se are not included here unless at some time the foundation had, or was purported to have, the status or function of an abbey, priory, or preceptory/commandery.

== Layout ==
Communities/provenance: shows the status and communities existing at each establishment, together with such dates as have been established as well as the fate of the establishment after dissolution, and the current status of the site.

Formal name or dedication: shows the formal name of the establishment or the person in whose name the church is dedicated, where known.

Alternative names: some of the establishments have had alternative names over the course of time. In order to assist in text-searching such alternatives in name or spelling have been provided.

== Abbreviations and key ==
The sites listed are ruins or fragmentary remains unless indicated thus:
| * | current monastic function |
| + | current non-monastic ecclesiastic function |
| ^ | current non-ecclesiastic function |
| = | remains incorporated into later structure |
| # | no identifiable trace of the monastic foundation remains |
| ~ | exact site of monastic foundation unknown |
| ø | possibly no such monastic foundation at location |
| ¤ | no such monastic foundation |
| ≈ | identification ambiguous or confused |

Locations with names in italics indicate probable duplication (misidentification with another location) or non-existent foundations (either erroneous reference or proposed foundation never implemented).

Trusteeship denoted as follows:
| NIEA | Scheduled Monument (NI) |
| NM | National Monument (ROI) |
| C.I. | Church of Ireland |
| R.C. | Roman Catholic Church |

| Foundation | Image | Communities & provenance | Formal name or dedication & alternative names | References & location |
|---|---|---|---|---|
| Carrickmacross Monastery | | early monastic site, founded before 845 | Cell-rois; Feara-rois | 53°58′18″N 6°43′09″W (?) |
| Clochensis Friary ^{~≈?} | | Augustinian Friars possibly Clones former house of Augustinian Canons (see immediately below) | Clockensis; Clochensis in Connacht; Clones | |
| Clones Abbey | | early monastic site, Gaelic monks, founded before 549/50 by St Tigernach; Augustinian Canons Regular founded after 1140? Augustinian Canons Regular — Arroasian? reformed c.1144?; dissolved after 1586?; granted to Sir Henry Duke possibly later Augustinian Friars (if Clokensis (see immediately above)) | SS Peter and Paul; St Tighernach ____________________ 'St Tierney' ; Wee Abbey; Cluain-eois; Cluan-auis; Clunes; Cluniscense; Clokensis? | 54°10′59″N 7°14′01″W |
| Clontibret Monastery | | early monastic site, Gaelic nuns, patronised by St Colman; termon land 1591 | Cluain-tiprat | 54°12′15″N 6°50′20″W (approx) |
| Connabury Monastery | | early monastic site, Gaelic nuns, founded before 740 | Gort-chonaigh | 54°07′02″N 6°43′57″W (approx) |
| Donagh Monastery | | early monastic site, Gaelic monks; erenagh 1542 | Domnachmaighe-da-chlaoine; Dumthomuach | 54°18′06″N 6°57′46″W (approx) |
| Donaghmoyne Monastery | | early monastic site, founded by St Patrick; plundered by Norsemen 832 | Domnach-maigen | 54°00′08″N 6°41′33″W |
| Drumsnat Monastery | | early monastic site, patronised by St Molua | Druim-snechta | 54°13′28″N 7°04′07″W |
| Errigal Trough Monastery | | early monastic site, Gaelic monks | Airecal-muadain | 54°23′09″N 7°00′09″W (approx) |
| Inniskeen Monastery | | early monastic site, founded before 587; burned 789; plundered 948; possibly not surviving after 10th century; burned 1166 | Inis-cain-dega; Inis-kin; Innishkeen | 54°00′04″N 6°34′37″W |
| Killeevan Abbey ^{~ø} | | supposed monastic site — order and period unknown; remains of "Abbey" church — possibly legendary | | |
| Kilmore Monastery ^{~} | | early monastic site burned 749 | St Aedan ____________________; Cell-mor of Aedan | |
| Loughbawn Abbey | | purported "Abbey" site | | 54°02′36″N 6°54′24″W |
| Monaghan Friary ^{=} | | Franciscan Friars Minor, Conventual founded 1462 (during the reign of Feidhlimidh Mac Mathgamna (Phelim MacMahon), King of Oriel) on the site of the early monastery (see immediately below); Observant Franciscan Friars reformed 1567; dissolved 1588-9, destroyed by the English 1589; granted to Edward Withe; fortified mansion built from the friary masonry by Lord Edward Blarney | Muinechan; Muineachan; Mounechan; Munichane | 54°14′51″N 6°58′12″W |
| Monaghan Monastery | | early monastic site (Note: Mervyn Archdall, Monasticon Hibernicum, 1786, references up to 1186 erroneously refer to Monoghan for Mucnamh (Muckno)); Franciscan friary built on site 1462 (see immediately above) | Muinechan; Muineachan; Mounechan; Munichane | 54°14′51″N 6°58′12″W |
| Muckno Monastery | | early monastic site, Gaelic monks; plundered by the Ulidians 1110; claimed by Augustinian Friars 17th to 19th century | Mucnamh; Muck Naimh; Mucshnamh; Muckna; Muckne | 54°07′01″N 6°41′55″W |
| Tehellan Monastery | | early monastic site, Gaelic monks founded 5th century by St Patrick | Tech-talan; Tech-talain; Tyhallan; Tyholland | 54°16′01″N 6°53′32″W (approx?) |
| Tedavnet Monastery | | early monastic site, Gaelic nuns founded 6th century by St Damhnat | Tech-damnata; Tydavnet | 54°17′46″N 7°01′00″W |
| Tullycorbet Monastery | | early monastic site | Tullach-carpait | |

The following location in County Monaghan lacks monastic connection:

- Clones 'Abbey': a ruined non-monastic church (NM)

== Map link to lists of monastic houses in Ireland by county ==
| Click on a county to go to the corresponding article. | Antrim; Armagh; Down; Fermanagh; Londonderry; Tyrone; Carlow; Cavan; Clare; Cork; Donegal; Dublin; Galway; Kerry; Kildare; Kilkenny; Laois; Leitrim; Limerick; Longford; Louth; Mayo; Meath; Monaghan; Offaly; Roscommon; Sligo; Tipperary; Waterford; Westmeath; Wexford; Wicklow |

== See also ==
- List of monastic houses in Ireland
