= List of monastic houses in County Antrim =

The smaller establishments such as monastic cells and notable monastic granges (particularly those with resident monks) and camerae of the military orders of monks (Knights Templars and Knights Hospitallers) are included. The numerous monastic hospitals per se are not included here unless at some time the foundation had, or was purported to have, the status or function of an abbey, priory, or preceptory/commandery.

== Layout ==
Communities/provenance: shows the status and communities existing at each establishment, together with such dates as have been established as well as the fate of the establishment after dissolution, and the current status of the site.

Formal name or dedication: shows the formal name of the establishment or the person in whose name the church is dedicated, where known.

Alternative names: some of the establishments have had alternative names over the course of time. In order to assist in text-searching such alternatives in name or spelling have been provided.

== Abbreviations and key ==
The sites listed are ruins or fragmentary remains unless indicated thus:
*	current monastic function
+	current non-monastic ecclesiastic function
^	current non-ecclesiastic function
=	remains incorporated into later structure
#	no identifiable trace of the monastic foundation remains
~	exact site of monastic foundation unknown
ø	possibly no such monastic foundation at location
¤	no such monastic foundation
≈	identification ambiguous or confused

Locations with names in italics indicate probable duplication (misidentification with another location) or non-existent foundations (either erroneous reference or proposed foundation never implemented).

Trusteeship denoted as follows:
NIEA	Scheduled Monument (NI)
NM	National Monument (ROI)
C.I.	Church of Ireland
R.C.	Roman Catholic Church

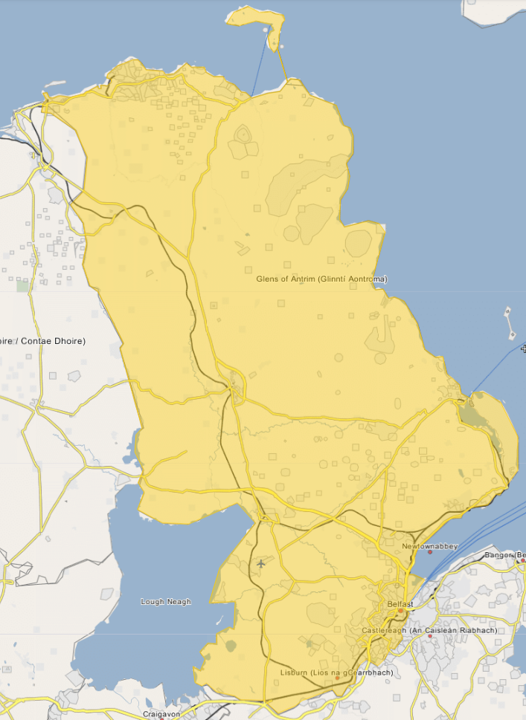
Locations of monastic houses in County Antrim

Foundation	Image	Communities & provenance	Formal name or dedication & alternative names	References & location
Aghnakilla Monastery ^{ø}		supposed early monastery dissolved before 11th century	Achad-cinn; Achad-na-cille; Aughnakeely	54°54′34″N 6°23′41″W (approx.)
Antrim Monastery		Gaelic monks possibly founded by St Comgall of Bangor; plundered 824; plundered 1018; destroyed 1147	Oen-truib; Aen-truib; Aentreb; Aontruibh; Eantrobh; Oentrebh	54°43′26″N 6°12′32″W
Ardclinis Friary ^{ø}		tradition of house of Franciscan Friars, Third Order Regular — evidence lacking		55°03′23″N 6°00′40″W
Armoy Monastery ^{ø}		supposed early monastery, founded by St Olcan; dissolved before 11th century	Airthir-maige; Domnach-; Ethirmoy	55°08′05″N 6°18′38″W
Ballycastle Friary ^{≈}		building called 'abbey', apparently built 1612 by Randal Mac Donnell, Earl of Antrim; standing until the Reformation; probably Bonamargy Friary (v. infra)		
Ballyprior Priory		Premonstratensian Canons — from Woodburn (community founded at Woodburn before 1326); transferred here 1542-3; dissolved after 1565	Magee Island Priory	54°50′05″N 5°44′25″W
Bonamargy Friary, Ballycastle		Franciscan Friars, Third Order Regular founded c.1500 (c.1475) by Rory MacQuillan, Lord of Reute (or Mac Donell); dissolved 1584; burned 1589; granted to the descendants of the founder Franciscan Friars, First Order Regular repaired & re-occupied at the petition of Father Conor Mac a'Bhaird, as a rest centre for missionaries 1626–1642, restored 1931; (NIEA)	Bunanmargaigh	55°12′07″N 6°13′52″W
Carrickfergus Abbey		Premonstratensian Canons daughter house of Dryburgh; priory founded before c.1183; raised to abbey status 1212; dissolved after 1320-6; succeeded by Woodburn (v. infra)		
Carrickfergus Friary ^{#}		Franciscan Friars Minor, Conventual founded 1232–48 by Hugh Lacy, Earl of Ulster; Observant Franciscan Friars reformed 1497; dissolved 1540; restored by Queen Mary 1557; friars expelled 1560; granted to Sir Edmund Fitzgerald, who assigned it to Sir Arthur Chichester, who built a castle on site 1610; used as a munitions store, rebuilt as Joymount House 1618; new house built by friars 1626	Carrac-fergusa; Cragfargas; Gracfergos; Grafergosensis	54°42′56″N 5°48′19″W
Church Island Monastery, Lough Beg				54°47′24″N 6°29′05″W
Church Island Abbey, Lough Beg				54°47′24″N 6°29′05″W
Clondrumalis Abbey ^{~≈?}		Premonstratensian Canons, possibly located in County Antrim, possibly Woodburn	Woodburn?	
Cluain Monastery ^{ø+}		supposed early monastery founded by St Oclan; dissolved before 11th century; C.I. parish church built on site	Kilcluain; Cell-chluaine	
Connor Monastery		church probably founded early 6th century by Mac Nissi (St Macnisse) (Oengus or Coemahan Breac); episcopal diocesan cathedral; diocese united with Down 1453	Coinnere; Condere; Coinnee	54°48′26″N 6°12′45″W
Cranfield Monastery		early monastic site, patron St Eoghan; by tradition the burial place of St Olcan	Maigi Cremc; Cremh-caille; Ecclesiaa de Crewill	54°42′15″N 6°21′49″W
Culfeightrin Monastery ^{ø}		supposed early monastery founded 5th century by St Patrick; dissolved before 11th century	Culechtrann; Kilfeutre; Magherintemple	55°11′32″N 6°12′44″W
Drumeeny Monastery ^{ø}		supposed early monastery early monastic site, monks; founded 5th century by St Patrick, who left bishop Enan in charge; dissolved before 11th century	Druim-findich; Druim-indeich; Druim Findich, Enán in; inDruim [Fh]indich, Enán; Ecclesia de Drum-Indich; Killeena; Gobbin's Heir Castle	55°10′59″N 6°13′19″W
Druim La Croix Abbey		Premonstratensian Canons daughter house of Dryburgh; founded before c.1250; dissolved after 1320-6; succeeded by Woodburn (v. infra)	Druim La Croix; White Abbey	54°40′05″N 5°54′30″W
Drumtullagh Monastery		grange founded 5th century by St Patrick	Telagh-Ceneoil-Oingusa; Tulach	55°09′31″N 6°23′35″W (approx.)
Dundesert Monastery		early monastic site, monks; coptic tradition?	Disert Ilidh? Disert Uilaigh?	54°37′33″N 6°12′13″W
Dunseverick Monastery		early monastic site, monks founded 5th century by St Patrick; first taken by Norsemen 871; destroyed 926	Dun-sebuirgi; Dun-sobairche	55°14′14″N 6°26′30″W (approx.)
Erdamh Monastery ^{~}		early monastic site, suggested to be County Antrim (Note: Mervyn Archdall, Monasticon Hibernicum, 1786, however not mentioned by W. Reeves, Ecclesiastical Antiquities of Down, Connor and Dromore, 1847)		
Glenarm Friary		Franciscan Friars, Third Order Regular founded 1465 by Robert Bissett, cousin of Robert Bissett, Provincial of the Third Order in Ireland; dissolved during the reign of Queen Elizabeth?; granted to Alexander MacDonnell, ancestor to the Earl of Antrim; site now occupied by St. Patrick's C.I. parish church	Gleann-arm	54°58′05″N 5°57′16″W
Glenavy Monastery		early monastic site founded by St Patrick; patron St Aidan, son of Colga; by tradition the burial place of the three daughters of St Comgall founder of Bangor Monastery	Laathrach Patraic; Lennewy, Ecclesia de, cum capella Lettir-phadruic; Gleann Abhaich; Lann Abhaigh	54°35′39″N 6°12′57″W
Glynn Monastery		early monastic site monks; church founded 5th century by St Patrick	Glinn; Glenn-Fineachta; Glenn-Indechta	54°49′21″N 5°49′11″W (approx.)
Inispollan Monastery		early monastic site, monks in existence 5th century, in the time of St Patrick	Inis-pollen	55°07′15″N 6°04′15″W (approx.)
Inver Friary		Franciscan Friars, Third Order Regular founded 1500 by a Scottish nobleman, Phelim O'Neil; dissolved during the reign of Queen Elizabeth? also erroneously given as Inver, County Donegal; granted to James V. Claneboys		54°50′51″N 5°50′24″W (approx.)
Kells Abbey		purportedly founded before 514 (in the time of St Macnise); apparently a hermitage by 828 of Ceallach mac Condmaigh, anchorite of Disirt Ceallaigh (possible confusion with same place name in County Galway); Augustinian Canons Regular — Arroasian? founded after 1140; destroyed 1316 by Edward Bruce; rebuilt early 15th century?; dissolved 1 February 1542, surrendered to the commissioners of Henry VIII; extant remains on site of textile factory	St Mary; The Augustinian monastery of Saint John the Baptist (1415) ____________________; Disert Abbey; de Diserto fonte-Conneri; Ceneles	54°48′35″N 6°13′14″W (approx.)
Kilboedain Monastery ^{~}		early monastic site, monks church founded by St Boedan, abbot	Cell-baedain; Cell-buadain; Kilscoba; possibly Ballywodan in Ardquin, or Ballibodan; Eiloseoba	
Kilroot Monastery		early monastic site, founded in or after 412 by St Colman who was sent by St Ailbe of Emly	Cell-ruaid; Cell-ruad	54°43′46″N 5°45′42″W (approx.)
Lambeg Friary		Franciscan Friars, Third Order Regular founded c.1500 by Phelim O'Neil (or M'Donnell); dissolved before 1572, probably destroyed by O'Neil to prevent use as a fort by the English	Lambegg Friary; Limbeg Friary	54°31′55″N 6°01′01″W
Layd Friary ^{ø}	Layde Church – geograph.org.uk – 742678	tradition of church now ruined belonging to Franciscan Friars purportedly founded by the sept of McFall (Macfaull) evidence lacking; also suggested as nuns or Dominican Friars	Lead; Lede; Port Obe	55°05′31″N 6°03′00″W
Linally Monastery	erroneous reference to Lynally, County Offaly			
Linn Monastery		early monastic site, nuns		
Magheramorne Monastery		early monastic site, monks founded 5th century by St Patrick	Domnach-mor-maige-damoerna	54°48′49″N 5°46′03″W
Massereene Friary		Franciscan Friars, Third Order Regular founded 1500 by Phelim O'Neil; dissolved during the reign of Queen Elizabeth?; granted to Sir Arthur Chichester, Baron of Belfast 1621	Mas-a-rioghna; Masraona; Masseryne; Masevin	54°42′30″N 6°13′43″W (approx.)
Muckamore Monastery ^{#}		Gaelic monks founded 585? (550) By St Colman Elo	Mag-comair; Moccumur; Mocmur; Mucimore; Muckmore; Mugcomuir	54°42′05″N 6°11′20″W
Muckamore Priory		Augustinian Canons Regular — Victorine founded before 1185; dissolved 1540-1; granted to the Longford family 1639; thatched house built on site 17th century replaced by house built and landscaped gardens before 1833, extant, without public access	Mag-comair; Moccumur; Mocmur; Mucimore; Muckmore; Mugcomuir	54°42′05″N 6°11′20″W
Portglenone Abbey Church *		Cistercian monks, O.C.S.O. founded 1948 from Baltinglass Abbey, Co Waterford; extant	Abbey of Our Lady of Bethlehem, Portglenone;	54°52′13″N 6°28′31″W
Portmore Monastery; Ballinderry	Portmore Church – geograph.org.uk – 346777	early monastic site, founded 6th century by St Lua; St Lua known in Scotland as St Moluag	Laloo; Lann Lua; La Lu	54°33′01″N 6°16′29″W
Portmuck 'Abbey'		Cistercian monks apparently a grange of Inch		
Rams Island Monastery		early monastic site, monks founded before 1056? by Gormgal?	Inis-darcairgrenn in Loch-n-Echach; Lann-Abhaid; Inisgatden	54°35′06″N 6°18′20″W
Rashee Monastery		early monastic site, founded 5th century by St Patrick	Raith-sithe; Rath-sithe	54°46′20″N 6°01′28″W (approx.)
Rath-easpuic-innic Monastery		early monastic site, founded 5th century by St Patrick	Raith-Epscuip-Fhindich; Capella de Corcrib; Corgrippe; Gortgrib	54°35′13″N 5°50′22″W (approx.)
Rathlin Monastery	Parish Church of St Thomas, Rathlin Island (2) – geograph.org.uk – 818545	attempted foundation c.546 by St Comgal of Bangor thwarted when driven away by armed men; church of Rechrann (identified as Rathlin (Note: Rathlin — identified with Rechrann by J. O'Donovan (identifications from notes in the Annals of the Four Masters, edited by J. O'Donnovan, 1848–51) and W. Reeves, Ecclesiastical Antiquities of Down, Connor and Dromore, 1847)) founded 635 by Segene, Abbot of Iona; burned by Norsemen 795; Reachru (identified as Rathlin (Note: Rathlin — identified with Reachru by J. O'Donovan (identifications from notes in the Annals of the Four Masters, ed. J. O'Donnovan, 1848–51))) plundered 1038; possession of the island gained by Earl of Essex, Lord Deputy, 1558	Reachrain; Raghera; Rachlainn; Rachlin; Rachlin Island; Raghlin	55°17′36″N 6°11′52″W
Rathmore Monastery		suggested to be Ratheaspuicinnic, (Note: Rathmore identified as Ratheaspuicinnic — M. Archdall, Monasticon Hibernicum, 1786) an early fortress (Note: Ratheaspuicinnic — W. Reeves, Ecclesiastical Antiquities of Down, Connor and Dromore, 1847, pp.279–81)		
Serade Kaill and Bedamegcan Friary ^{~}		Franciscan Friars, Third Order Regular founded 1445, Archdeacon of Connor appointed to license the building of a monastery by Eugenius IV; dissolved ?	Bademeghcadab; Straid Friary?	
Skerry Monastery		founded by St. Patrick; mentioned by Tírechan c.670 as – ad montem Scirte ad locum petrae.. vestigium pedis; N/E of the old church ruins lies a patch of rock with a depression known as St Patrick's footprint; close by the church is Tubernacool holy well; Slemish mountain lies two miles south-east across the river Braid valley.	Schire Padruic; Shirec Archaille; rock of Skirit; Schirich	54°54′50″N 6°08′45″W
Templepatrick Preceptory ^{ø}		town said to be named for a Knights Hospitaller foundation — evidence lacking	Villa Hugonis de Logan	
Woodburn Abbey		Premonstratensian Canons daughter house of Dryburgh, Scotland; founded before 1326 (1242), by John de Courcy, in succession to Carrickfergus and Druim La Croix (v. supra); dissolved 1 March 1542 [sic] (1542–3), surrendered to the commissioners of Henry VIII; canons transferred to Ballyprior; partly demolished after 1558; site now occupied by Carrickfergus Industrial Centre	The Holy Trinity; St Mary; ____________________; Goodborn Priory	54°42′29″N 5°50′12″W

== Map link to lists of monastic houses in Ireland by county ==
Click on a county to go to the corresponding article	Antrim; Armagh; Down; Fermanagh; Londonderry; Tyrone; Carlow; Cavan; Clare; Cork; Donegal; Dublin; Galway; Kerry; Kildare; Kilkenny; Laois; Leitrim; Limerick; Longford; Louth; Mayo; Meath; Monaghan; Offaly; Roscommon; Sligo; Tipperary; Waterford; Westmeath; Wexford; Wicklow

== See also ==
- List of monastic houses in Ireland
