= List of monastic houses in County Armagh =

The smaller establishments such as monastic cells and notable monastic granges (particularly those with resident monks) and camerae of the military orders of monks (Knights Templars and Knights Hospitallers) are included. The numerous monastic hospitals per se are not included here unless at some time the foundation had, or was purported to have, the status or function of an abbey, priory, or preceptory/commandery.

== Layout ==
Communities/provenance: shows the status and communities existing at each establishment, together with such dates as have been established as well as the fate of the establishment after dissolution, and the current status of the site.

Formal name or dedication: shows the formal name of the establishment or the person in whose name the church is dedicated, where known.

Alternative names: some of the establishments have had alternative names over the course of time. In order to assist in text-searching such alternatives in name or spelling have been provided.

== Abbreviations and key ==
The sites listed are ruins or fragmentary remains unless indicated thus:
| * | current monastic function |
| + | current non-monastic ecclesiastic function |
| ^ | current non-ecclesiastic function |
| = | remains incorporated into later structure |
| # | no identifiable trace of the monastic foundation remains |
| ~ | exact site of monastic foundation unknown |
| ø | possibly no such monastic foundation at location |
| ¤ | no such monastic foundation |
| ≈ | identification ambiguous or confused |

Locations with names in italics indicate probable duplication (misidentification with another location) or non-existent foundations (either erroneous reference or proposed foundation never implemented).

Trusteeship denoted as follows:
| NIEA | Scheduled Monument (NI) |
| NM | National Monument (ROI) |
| C.I. | Church of Ireland |
| R.C. | Roman Catholic Church |

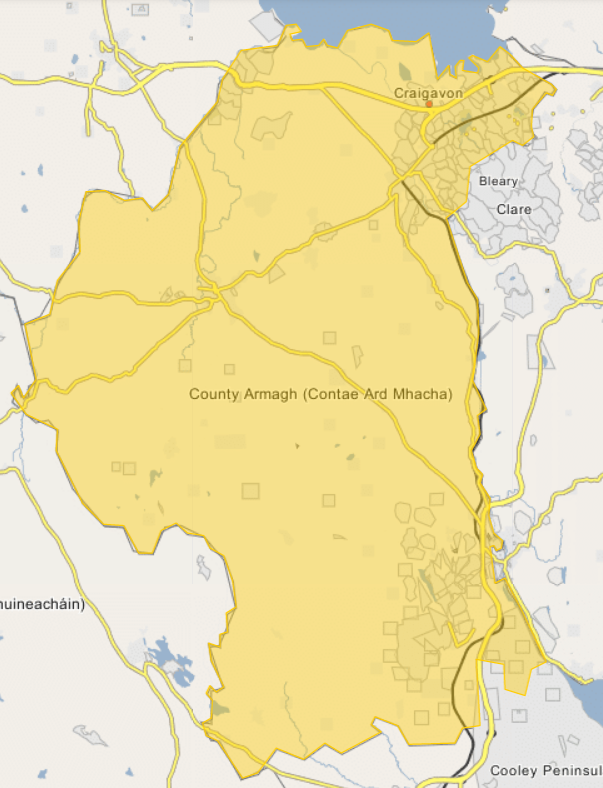
Locations of monastic houses in County Armagh
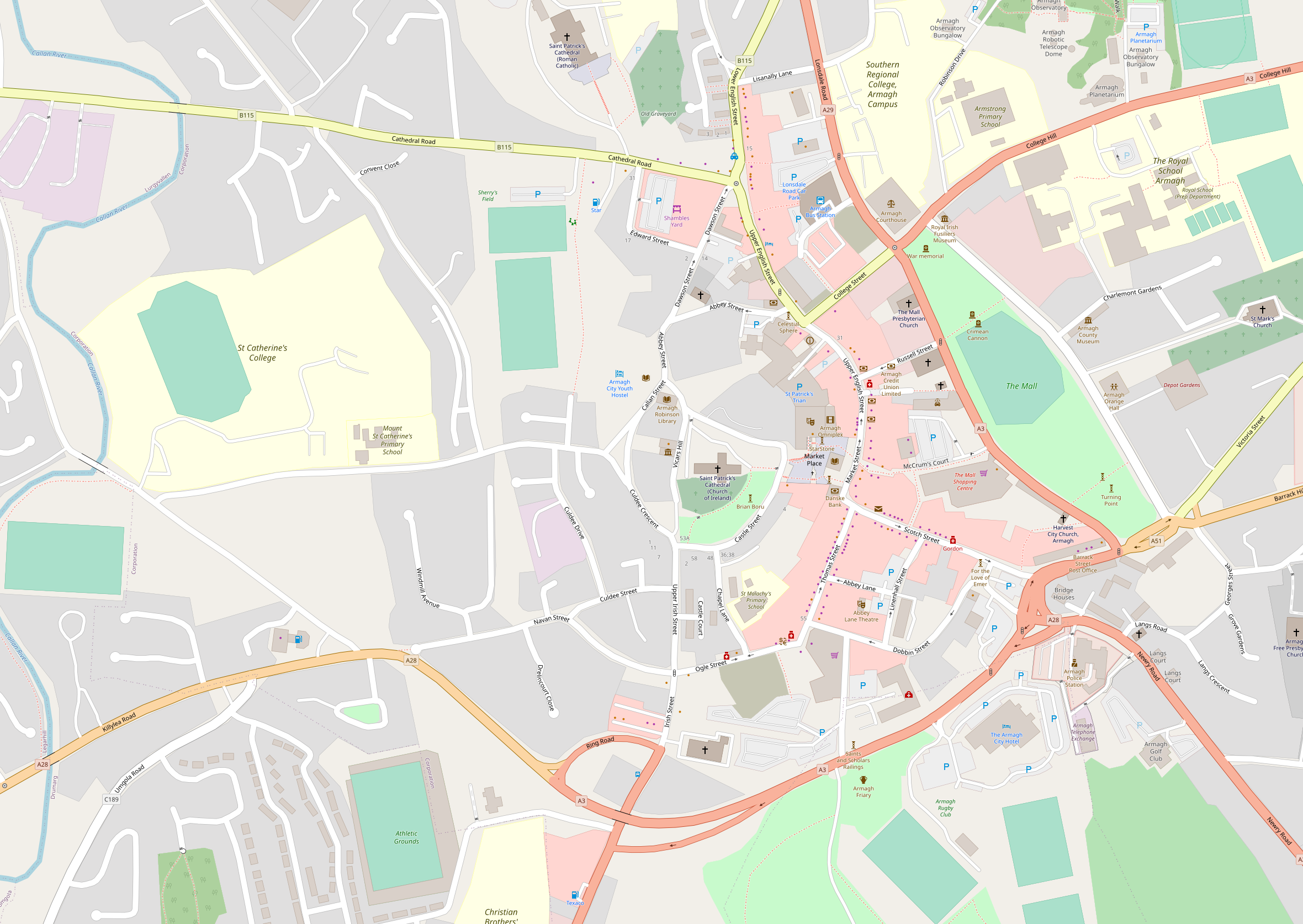
Locations of monastic houses in Armagh

| Foundation | Image | Communities & provenance | Formal name or dedication & alternative names | References & location |
|---|---|---|---|---|
| Armagh Abbey | | Augustinian Canons Regular founded before 1126, consecrated by Archbishop Cellach 1126; refounded 1134; Augustinian Canons Regular — Arroasian adopted c. 1140 at the instigation of St Malachy; dissolved 1562; re-established | SS Peter and Paul | 54°20′58″N 6°39′22″W (approx) |
| Armagh Blackfriars ^{ø} | | suggested community of Dominican Friars purportedly founded c. 1264 by Patrick O'Scanlon; evidence lacking | | |
| Armagh Priory of Culdees | | Culdees founded before 779 | Ard-macha; Altum Machae; Emain-Macha; Druim Saillech | 54°20′49″N 6°39′25″W (approx) |
| Armagh Temple-na-Ferta ?Abbey | | Gaelic nuns founded 5th century by St Patrick; Augustinian Cannonesses Regular — Arroasian? apparently refounded c. 1144?; dissolved 1562?; granted to Francis Annesley, Esq. by King James 1618 | Temple Fortagh | 54°20′49″N 6°39′07″W (approx) |
| Armagh Temple Brigid ?Priory | | Gaelic nuns dependent on Temple-na-Ferta founded 5th century by St Patrick; Augustinian Cannonesses Regular — Arroasian? apparently refounded c. 1144?; dissolved 1562? | Templebreed Priory | 54°20′51″N 6°39′17″W (approx) |
| Armagh Friary ^{#} | | Franciscan Friars founded 1263/4-1551 by Archbishop Patrick O’Scannail; dissolved 1542, though some religious life continued; buildings were used for welfare purposes later in the 16th century; ruinous by 1600 | | 54°20′38″N 6°39′11″W |
| Armagh Abbey of Columcille | | founded before 1010; noted as St Columba’s Church – Rocque’s 1760 map of Armagh | Templecolumkilly in Bore-netrian-sassenach | 54°20′59″N 6°39′24″W (approx) |
| Ballymoyer Monastery ^{≈} | | early monastic site, founded by St Patrick, (Note: Ballymyre identified with Tahellin — J.B. Leslie, Armagh Clergy and Parishes, 1911) possibly Tehallan, County Monaghan (Note: Ballymyre identified with Tehallin — G. T. Stokes and Hennessy) | Baile-mac-maier; Ballymyre; Tech-talain?; Tahellen? | 54°13′02″N 6°31′22″W |
| Creggan | | Franciscan Friars, First Order — place of refuge | Cregan | 54°04′57″N 6°34′34″W (approx) |
| Derrynoose Monastery ^{~} | | early monastic site, founded 6th century by Mochua of Dairinis; later Culdees of Armagh also suggested to be located in County Cavan (Note: Derrynoose identified with Dairinis, County Cavan — Plummer; Rev. T. Fee, communications, identifies 'in terra Ergallensium' as Derrynoose, County Armagh) | Dairinis; Derinish; Derenoyse; Toaghy | 54°13′57″N 6°47′04″W |
| Eglish Monastery | | early monastic site; remains of two high crosses on site (Note: Eglish — Rev. T. Fee, communications) | Eglais | 54°23′39″N 6°45′35″W |
| Killevy Friary ^{≈¤} | Franciscan Friars, Third Order Regular actually Killeenbrenan, County Mayo — the house at Killevy being a convent of nuns | | Kilslere Friary | |
| Killevy Abbey | | Gaelic nuns (community founded c. 484 at Faughart; transferred to Beg-erin, County Wexford) transferred from Beg-erin: founded c. 500 (517) by St Moninna (Darerca); Augustinian Cannonesses Regular — Arroasian? refounded after 1171? C.I. parish church built on site | Cell Sleibe Cuilin; Cell-shleibe; Cell-shleibe-mor-Cuillin; Mons-Cuillinn; Kilsleve; Belslebhe; Killeavy | 54°08′14″N 6°24′33″W |
| Kill-unche Monastery ^{~} | | founded by St Nectan in reg. Conalliae Murthemhne, possibly located in County Armagh | | |
| Kilmore Monastery | | early monastic site, founded by St Mochta burned 749; also identified as Kilmore, County Monaghan; Church of Ireland church built on site | Cellmor-einer; Cellmor-muighe-emhir; Cellmor-Ua-Niallain; Cellmor-inir; Cellmor-Aedhan; Kilmore Aedhan; cell-mor; Cella Magna?; Lismor?; Killmor-Aedhan? | 54°24′01″N 6°32′53″W |
| Kilnasaggart Monastery ^{#} | | site occupied by the Kilnasaggart Stone | Ternocc mac Ciarain dećc; i Cill na Saccart | 54°04′18″N 6°22′46″W (approx) |
| Mullaghbrack | | Armagh Culdees – the Prebendary of Mullaghbrack | Mullach Breac | 54°19′13″N 6°31′40″W |
| Seagoe Monastery | | early monastic site, founded by St Gobhan, abbot | Suidhe Gobha; Tech-da-Gobha; Tegh-da-Gobha | 54°26′15″N 6°25′28″W |
| Straidbail-Loyse Friary ^{≈} | | given as friary of Franciscans founded 1282; probable mistaken reference to Stradbally, County Laois | | |
| Tartaraghan | | Grange of the Abbey of St. Peter and St. Paul in Armagh | | 54°26′59″N 6°33′12″W |
| Tassagh Priory | | Culdees, dependent on Armagh and Derrynoose; St Tassach? Culdee cemetery | Ballintassa; Tassaghowtragh | 54°16′50″N 6°40′20″W |
| Tech-fethgnai Monastery | | early monastic site, possibly a cell near Armagh monastery, founded by Mael-muire, erenagh | | |
| Tynan Abbey ^{#} | | Gaelic monks founded before 1072; mansion named Fairview built on site c. 1750; remodelled in the monastic-gothic style, residence of the Stronge family; part in use by the Royal Ulster Constabulary from 1923; bombed by the IRA 21 January 1981; demolished 1998 | Tiudhnidha; Tuidnigha | 54°19′52″N 6°49′23″W |

== Map link to lists of monastic houses in Ireland by county ==
| Click on a county to go to the corresponding article. | Antrim; Armagh; Down; Fermanagh; Londonderry; Tyrone; Carlow; Cavan; Clare; Cork; Donegal; Dublin; Galway; Kerry; Kildare; Kilkenny; Laois; Leitrim; Limerick; Longford; Louth; Mayo; Meath; Monaghan; Offaly; Roscommon; Sligo; Tipperary; Waterford; Westmeath; Wexford; Wicklow |

== See also ==
- List of monastic houses in Ireland
