= List of monastic houses in County Wicklow =

This is a list of the monastic houses in County Wicklow, Ireland

The smaller establishments such as monastic cells and notable monastic granges (particularly those with resident monks) and camerae of the military orders of monks (Knights Templars and Knights Hospitallers) are included. The numerous monastic hospitals per se are not included here unless at some time the foundation had, or was purported to have, the status or function of an abbey, priory, or preceptory/commandery.

== Layout ==
Communities/provenance: shows the status and communities existing at each establishment, together with such dates as have been established as well as the fate of the establishment after dissolution, and the current status of the site.

Formal name or dedication: shows the formal name of the establishment or the person in whose name the church is dedicated, where known.

Alternative names: some of the establishments have had alternative names over the course of time. In order to assist in text-searching such alternatives in name or spelling have been provided.

== Abbreviations and key ==
The sites listed are ruins or fragmentary remains unless indicated thus:
*	current monastic function
+	current non-monastic ecclesiastic function
^	current non-ecclesiastic function
=	remains incorporated into later structure
#	no identifiable trace of the monastic foundation remains
~	exact site of monastic foundation unknown
ø	possibly no such monastic foundation at location
¤	no such monastic foundation
≈	identification ambiguous or confused

Locations with names in italics indicate probable duplication (misidentification with another location) or non-existent foundations (either erroneous reference or proposed foundation never implemented).

Trusteeship denoted as follows:
NIEA	Scheduled Monument (NI)
NM	National Monument (ROI)
C.I.	Church of Ireland
R.C.	Roman Catholic Church

Foundation	Image	Communities & provenance	Formal name or dedication & alternative names	References & location
Aghowle Monastery		early monastic site, founded by St Finnian of Clonard; in existence 1017, erenaghs at least to 1050	Achad-abhall; Achag-abla; Aghold	52°45′51″N 6°36′17″W (approx)
Arklow Abbey		Cistercian monks — from Wyresdale; founded before 1204; dissolved 1205, transferred to Abington	Arcloa; Arkelo; Envermor; Invermor	
Arklow Priory		Dominican Friars founded 1264 by Thomas Theobald fitz Walter, Pincerna (Butler) of Ireland, buried here; dissolved 1539; granted to John Travers 1544	The Holy Cross; The True Cross	52°47′50″N 6°09′16″W
Ballinabarny Friary ^{~}		Franciscan Friars, First Order founded before 1650		
Ballykine Monastery		early monastic site, purportedly founded by a brother of St Kevin; private residence named Whaley Abbey built on site	Baile-coemgen	52°53′28″N 6°15′28″W
Baltinglass Abbey		Cistercian monks — from Mellifont founded 1148 by Dermot Mac Murrough; briefly dependent on Furness 1277; dissolved 1536; granted to Sir Edmond Butler 1536; converted into a private house and Protestant church; abandoned 1883; (NM)	Belachconglais; Vallis Salutis	52°56′38″N 6°42′35″W
Bray Monastery		early monastic house, bishops recorded	Brae; Bree	53°12′25″N 6°07′03″W (approx)
Delgany Carmelite Monastery		Carmelite nuns		53°08′06″N 6°05′32″W
Delgany Monastery		early monastic site, possibly founded by St Coemgen of Glendalough, or by (or for) St Mogoroc (Chuarog)	Deilgne-mochorog; Dergne	53°07′58″N 6°05′34″W
Ennereilly Monastery		early monastic site, founded before 639	Inber-daoille; Inber-daele; Inber-daga; Inverdoil	52°50′36″N 6°06′01″W
Ennisboyne Monastery		early monastic site		52°55′29″N 6°02′27″W
Ferrybank Abbey		Cistercian monks		52°48′00″N 6°08′59″W
Glendalough Cathedral and Monastery		early monastic site, founded 6th century by St Kevin (Coemgen); diocesan cathedral 1111; burned 1163; Augustinian Canons Regular abbeyfounded after 1163?; merged with Dublin 1216; Augustinian Canons Regular — Arroasian priory founded before 1306; dissolved 1398?, burned by the English;	St Kevin ____________________; Glen-da-locha; Glinne-da-loch; Glydelagh	53°00′38″N 6°19′37″W
St Saviour's Priory, near Derrybawn		Augustinian Canons Regular dependent on Holy Trinity, Dublin; purportedly founded before 1162? by St Laurence O'Toole; Augustinian Canons Regular — Arroasian reformed probably soon after 1163; dependent on All Saints', Dublin from before 1216; dissolved 1398	Glenlorcan; Regles; St Saviour Priory	53°00′28″N 6°18′44″W
Killaird Monastery ^{~}		early monastic site, nuns	Cell-aine	
Killodry Priory ^{~}		Augustinian Canons Regular cell, dependent on St Thomas's, Dublin; foundation unknown; possibly located in County Wicklow dissolved 1539		
Rathnew Monastery		early monastic site, founded before 779, patronised by St Ernin	Raithnua	52°59′36″N 6°04′47″W
Shelton Abbey ^{^}		now a state forestry school		52°48′58″N 6°11′26″W
Tigroney Monastery ^{ø~}		purported early monastic site, possibly founded by St Palladus possibly non-monastic	Tech-na-roman; Teachromam	52°51′45″N 6°12′25″W (possible)
Wicklow Friary		Franciscan Friars Minor, Conventual founded before 1268? (during the reign of Henry III); Observant Franciscan Friars reformed after 1521?; dissolved c.1551; leased to Henry Harrington 1575	Cell-mantain; Cell-mentain; Bachilow; Bichilo; Wykynlow	52°58′53″N 6°02′47″W
Wicklow Priory		Benedictine nuns founded c.1448; dissolved c.1470	Cell-mantain; Cell-mentain; Bachilow; Bichilo; Wykynlow	

== Map link to lists of monastic houses in Ireland by county ==
Click on a county to go to the corresponding article.	Antrim; Armagh; Down; Fermanagh; Londonderry; Tyrone; Carlow; Cavan; Clare; Cork; Donegal; Dublin; Galway; Kerry; Kildare; Kilkenny; Laois; Leitrim; Limerick; Longford; Louth; Mayo; Meath; Monaghan; Offaly; Roscommon; Sligo; Tipperary; Waterford; Westmeath; Wexford; Wicklow

== See also ==
- List of monastic houses in Ireland
