= List of monastic houses in County Offaly =

The smaller establishments such as monastic cells and notable monastic granges (particularly those with resident monks) and camerae of the military orders of monks (Knights Templars and Knights Hospitallers) are included. The numerous monastic hospitals per se are not included here unless at some time the foundation had, or was purported to have, the status or function of an abbey, priory, or preceptory/commandery.

== Layout ==
Communities/provenance: shows the status and communities existing at each establishment, together with such dates as have been established as well as the fate of the establishment after dissolution, and the current status of the site.

Formal name or dedication: shows the formal name of the establishment or the person in whose name the church is dedicated, where known.

Alternative names: some of the establishments have had alternative names over the course of time. In order to assist in text-searching such alternatives in name or spelling have been provided.

== Abbreviations and key ==
The sites listed are ruins or fragmentary remains unless indicated thus:
*	current monastic function
+	current non-monastic ecclesiastic function
^	current non-ecclesiastic function
=	remains incorporated into later structure
#	no identifiable trace of the monastic foundation remains
~	exact site of monastic foundation unknown
ø	possibly no such monastic foundation at location
¤	no such monastic foundation
≈	identification ambiguous or confused

Locations with names in italics indicate probable duplication (misidentification with another location) or non-existent foundations (either erroneous reference or proposed foundation never implemented).

Trusteeship denoted as follows:
NIEA	Scheduled Monument (NI)
NM	National Monument (ROI)
C.I.	Church of Ireland
R.C.	Roman Catholic Church

Foundation	Image	Communities & provenance	Formal name or dedication & alternative names	References & location
Banagher Monastery		early monastic site; church of St Mary built on site, now ruined	Bennchore	53°11′21″N 7°59′13″W
Birr Monastery ^{#}		early monastic site, founded before 573 by St Brendan of Birr; plundered by the men of Dublin 842; burned 1167	Biorra; Birra; Biror; Parsonstown	53°05′42″N 7°54′48″W
Clareen Monastery		founded 6th century	St Kieran; Seir Kieran	52°59′54″N 7°54′45″W
Cloghan Friary ^{~}		Franciscan Friars purportedly founded c.1595 by the Lord Deputy, Sir William Russell, who took Cloghan Castle from O'Madden (Note: Cassell, Gazetteer of Great Britain and Ireland ii, p.52) — dubious		
Clonmacnoise Cathedral and Monastery		early monastic site; diocesan cathedral 1111; Augustinian Canons Regular founded after 1140; Augustinian Canons Regular — Arroasian? refounded? c.1144; dissolved c.1268; secular college founded 1459;; dissolved 1568	Cluain-maccu-nois; Cluain-mic-nois; Cluan; Tipraic, with Eaglais-beaag	53°19′35″N 7°59′09″W
Clonmacnoise Abbey		Augustinian Canons Regular — Arroasian? founded 12th century separate from the cathedral (see immediately above); dissolution date unknown — later abbots (up to 1384) may have been titular		
Clonmacnoise Abbey (nuns)		early monastic site, nuns founded before 1026; Augustinian nuns — Arroasian; dependent on Clonard; refounded c.1144? by Devorghilla, daughter of Murchad O Melaghlin; St Mary's church rebuilt dependent on Kilcreevanty 1223; dissolved after 1500?	St Mary ____________________; Kelbygmieth; Kellogainechan; Riaghtalta Kailleach	53°19′42″N 7°58′42″W
Clonsast Monastery		early monastic site, founded late 7th century by St Bearchan (Note: O. S. Muirthuile, Tullamore Official Guide, p.16; E. Hogan, Onomasticon Goedelicum, R.I.A., 1910 p.270)	Cluain-Sasta	53°13′18″N 7°08′13″W
Cluain-an-dobhair ^{~}		early monastic site, not yet identified, possibly located in County Offaly		
Cluain-dachrann Monastery ^{~}		possible chapel or cell of Rahan, possibly founded by St Carthag	erroneously Clonrane, (Note: Mervyn Archdall, Monasticon Hibernicum, 1786, p.708) County Westmeath	
Craebheach Monastery ^{~}		early monastic site, possibly founded c.450 by St Trian, disciple of St Patrick possibly located in County Offaly, site near the River Brosna, possibly near Clonmacnois	Croebheach; Craibheach	
Croghan Monastery		early monastic site, founded before 490/492	Cruachan Bri Eli	53°20′45″N 7°17′39″W
Drumcullen Monastery ^{~}		early monastic site, founded before 591, also given located in County Westmeath (Note: Harris's Table, Ware-Harris, Antiquities, 1745, p.264 and Mervyn Archdall, Monasticon Hibernicum, 1786, p.709)	Druim-cuilinn	53°06′19″N 7°43′48″W
Durrow Abbey		early monastic site, founded 556 or 565 by St Colmcille, site granted by Aedh mac Brendain, King of Tethba; burned 1095; Augustinian Canons Regular — Arroasian probable double monastery with Durrow Priory (see immediately below); founded after 1144? by Murchad O'Melaghlin, possibly at the instance of St Malachy; burned 1153; burned twice 1155; destroyed by the Anglo-Normans 1175; founded after; 310,317	St Mary ____________________; Dermag-coluim-cille; Diarmag-coluim-cille; Durmag-coluim-cille; Dorro; Dower; Deevo? (sic. County Westmeath)	53°19′33″N 7°31′11″W
Durrow Priory ^{#}		Augustinian nuns — Arroasian dependent on Clonard; probable double monastery with Durrow Abbey (see immediately above); founded after 1144? by Murchad O'Melaghlin, possibly at the instance of St Malachy; dissolved after 1195?, granted to the nuns of Clonard; nuns probably transferred to Killeigh after 1195	St Mary	
Gageborough Priory		nuns (order unknown) founded 13th century? by Matilda de Lacy; dissolution unknonwn		53°23′22″N 7°36′06″W (approx)
Gallen Priory		founded 5th century by St Canoc; Augustinian Canons Regular founded c.1140-8; Augustinian Canons Regular — Arroasian? possibly adopted at the instance of St Malachy; ruined 1519; plundered 1531 and 1548; probably dissolved before/c. 1585; granted to Sir Gerald More 1612; reoccupied after 1620 probably refounded by the MacCoghlans, benefactors	Gallimh; Galeang; Galin; Galynn; Glinnensis	53°15′45″N 7°49′24″W
Kilbian Monastery ^{≈}		early monastic site, founded 583, (Note: Conry) possibly by St Abban, (Note: Mervyn Archdall, Monasticon Hibernicum, 1786, p398) possibly located in County Offaly	Kilmbian?	
Kilcolgan Monastery		early monastic site, founded by St Colgan son of Kellach	Cell-colgain	53°16′18″N 7°46′56″W (approx?)
Kilcolman Monastery		early monastic site, founded by St Colman Niger (possibly Colman of Duir-mor)	Cell-colmain; Insula Vitae (Note: Ordnance Survey)	53°02′53″N 7°52′35″W
Kilcomin Monastery		early monastic site, founded before 669	Cell-cumain; Disert Chuimin	52°58′07″N 7°57′46″W
Kilcormac Friary		Carmelite Friars founded 1406 by Odo (Hugh), son of Nellan Mulloy, buried here; dissolved before 1579?; granted to George Cowley 1579; granted to Robert Leicester, probably after 1599	St Mary ____________________; Cell-chormaic; Kil-carmic; Kil-marmick; Frankford	53°10′38″N 7°43′35″W
Killagally Monastery ^{≈}		early monastic site	Kilalga? (County Meath)	
Killeigh Priory ^{+=}		early monastic site abbey founded before 549 by St Sinchell, son of Cenandan; Augustinian Canons Regular dependent on Durrow; priory founded after 1144?; Augustinian Canons Regular — Arroasian probably adopted before 1148 or after 1163; dissolved c.1569; granted to John Lee 1576; temporal possessions granted to Gerald, Earl of Kildare 1578; church became parochial; remains incorporated into C.I. parish church	The Holy Cross (Note: James Ware, De Hibernia, et Antiquitatibus ejus, 1654 edition); St Mary (15th century)	53°12′56″N 7°27′15″W
Killeigh Priory (nuns) ^{#}		Augustinian Canonesses — Arroasian? founded after 1195?; dissolved c.1569?		53°12′45″N 7°27′05″W
Killeigh Friary		Franciscan Friars Minor, Conventual founded 1293? (before 1303) by Edward I; dissolved c.1598, buildings destroyed c.1598; granted to John Allee, friars apparently remained in the area Observant Franciscan Friars adopted 1632		53°12′49″N 7°27′11″W
Killyon Monastery		early monastic site, nuns founded 5th century (after the death of his father) by St Ciaran for his mother, Liedania	Cell-liadain; Kil-liadhuin	53°05′56″N 7°48′52″W
Kilmeelchon Monastery		early monastic site, founded 5th century by St Gussacht mac Milchon; extant 883	Cell-mic-milchon	53°11′24″N 8°00′33″W (approx)
Kinnitty Monastery ^{#}		early monastic site, possibly founded by 557; plundered by Norsemen 842; site possibly marked by a High cross within a churchyard		53°06′11″N 7°41′51″W (possibly)
Lemanaghan Monastery		early monastic site, founded c.645-6 by St Managhan?, land granted to the community at Clonmacnoise; extant 893; apparently extant 1205	St Managhan ____________________; Leith-manchain; Liath-manchain; Manchan Leith; Tuaim nEirc	53°17′35″N 7°44′37″W
Lusmagh Monastery		early monastic site, founded 7th century by St Cronan	Herbosus Campus	53°10′21″N 8°01′13″W (?)
Lusmagh Friary ^{≈ø}		Franciscan Friars — possibly never established	Clochincantualaig?	
Lynally Monastery ^{#}		Columban monks founded c.590 by St Colman Elo; burned by Dohmnall mac Murchadh 970	Lann-Elo; Lann-Eala; Linnalli; Lynnealla	53°15′55″N 7°33′21″W
Monasteroris Friary		Franciscan Friars Minor, Conventual founded 1325 by John de Bermingham, Earl of Louth; Observant Franciscan Friars adopted before 1507; dissolved after 1542; granted to Nicholas Herbert before 1587	Feoruis; Macfeorais; Mainister-oras; Moitot; Mortoto; Thetmoy; Totmoy; Tuaith-maigh	53°20′51″N 7°05′02″W
Roscrea — Mount St Joseph's Abbey *		Cistercian monks — Trappist — from Mount Melleray Abbey, County Waterford founded 1878; extant		52°57′49″N 7°51′21″W
Rahan Monastery		early monastic site, monks founded c.590-635, purportedly by Camelacus, Patrician bishop; great monastery founded by St Carthach (Mochuda); suggested (Note: Journal, Royal Society of Antiquaries of Ireland, xxvi. p.317) Augustinian Canons Regular briefly, possibly after 1171 — improbable and documentary evidence lacking	St Carthach ____________________; Raihen; Rath-an; Rath-enin; Rath-yne	53°16′42″N 7°36′43″W
Rathlihen Monastery		early monastic site, founded before c.540 by St Illand	Rathlipthen; Rathlibthen	53°11′57″N 7°38′57″W
Reynagh Monastery		early monastic site, nuns	Cell-rignaighe; Kill-rignaighe; suggested Kilrane, (Note: E. Hogan, S. J., Onomasticon Goedelicum, R.I.A., 1910, p.210) County Wexford	53°09′22″N 7°57′36″W
Seirkieran Priory		early monastic site, founded 5th century by St Ciaran; Augustinian Canons Regular founded before c.1170; dissolved 1568, surrendered 27 December 1568	St Ciaran; St Mary ____________________; Saiger Chiarain; Saegir-Querayn; St Keranus de Sayr; Kieran de Sayr; Sayrkeran; Syrkyeran	53°04′13″N 7°47′33″W
Tihelly Monastery ^{#}		early monastic site founded 5th century; burned 670;	Tihilly; Tech-telle; Tech-taille; Tehelly; Templekieran	53°18′39″N 7°32′39″W

== Map link to lists of monastic houses in Ireland by county ==
Click on a county to go to the corresponding article.	Antrim; Armagh; Down; Fermanagh; Londonderry; Tyrone; Carlow; Cavan; Clare; Cork; Donegal; Dublin; Galway; Kerry; Kildare; Kilkenny; Laois; Leitrim; Limerick; Longford; Louth; Mayo; Meath; Monaghan; Offaly; Roscommon; Sligo; Tipperary; Waterford; Westmeath; Wexford; Wicklow

== See also ==
- List of monastic houses in Ireland
