= List of monastic houses in County Louth =

The smaller establishments such as monastic cells and notable monastic granges (particularly those with resident monks) and camerae of the military orders of monks (Knights Templars and Knights Hospitallers) are included. The numerous monastic hospitals per se are not included here unless at some time the foundation had, or was purported to have, the status or function of an abbey, priory, or preceptory/commandery.

== Layout ==
Communities/provenance: shows the status and communities existing at each establishment, together with such dates as have been established as well as the fate of the establishment after dissolution, and the current status of the site.

Formal name or dedication: shows the formal name of the establishment or the person in whose name the church is dedicated, where known.

Alternative names: some of the establishments have had alternative names over the course of time. In order to assist in text-searching such alternatives in name or spelling have been provided.

== Abbreviations and key ==
The sites listed are ruins or fragmentary remains unless indicated thus:
*	current monastic function
+	current non-monastic ecclesiastic function
^	current non-ecclesiastic function
=	remains incorporated into later structure
#	no identifiable trace of the monastic foundation remains
~	exact site of monastic foundation unknown
ø	possibly no such monastic foundation at location
¤	no such monastic foundation
≈	identification ambiguous or confused

Locations with names in italics indicate probable duplication (misidentification with another location) or non-existent foundations (either erroneous reference or proposed foundation never implemented).

Trusteeship denoted as follows:
NIEA	Scheduled Monument (NI)
NM	National Monument (ROI)
C.I.	Church of Ireland
R.C.	Roman Catholic Church

Foundation	Image	Communities & provenance	Formal name or dedication & alternative names	References & location
Ardee Priory Hospital		Crutched Friars, brethren and sisters founded c.1207 by Roger Pipard; hospital confirmed 1211 by Eugene, Archbishop of Armagh; dissolved 1539, surrendered 6 December 1539 by Prior George Dowdall; granted to George Dowdall (by then Archbishop of Armagh) for life 1544 by Queen Mary; granted to Edward Moore 1579	St John the Baptist ____________________; Ath-fhirdiadh; Ath-firdead; Ath-ferdia; Ath-erdea; Aichirde; de Atrio Dei	53°51′13″N 6°32′12″W
Ardee White Friars		Carmelite Friars founded after 1272 (during the reign of Edward I) by Ralph Pipard rebuilt by the townsmen by 1302, land etc granted by John Littleboy and two others; church burnt down 1315 by the followers of Edward the Bruce whilst filled with men, women and children; dissolved 1539; demolished by the commissioners by 30 September 1540 and the materials sold; friars subsequently returned to Ardee	Priory of St Mary of Mount Carmel of Athirde	53°51′15″N 6°32′22″W (approx)
Ardee Preceptory ^{~}		Knights Hospitaller (Note: White's list c.1658 (M. Lenihan, Limerick, its History and Antiquities, 1866, p.562;, cf. Registrum Kilmainham, edited by C. McNeill, IMS, 1943, pp.140, 155))		
Ardpatrick Monastery		early monastic site, founded 5th century by St Patrick, purportedly a leper hospital, more likely a hospital for the sick (Note: Dr Logan doubts there were lepers in Ireland at the time of St Patrick)		
Ballymascanlan Priory		Cistercian monks apparently intended daughter of Mellifont, 1232-3, on lands granted by Hugh de Lacy; project abandoned 1236, probably deemed too close to Newry		
Carlingford Priory		Dominican Friars founded 1305 or 1307 by Richard de Burgo, Earl (Rufus) of Ulster; (Note: Tomas de Burgo, Hibernica Dominicana, 1762 edition; A. P. Coleman, O.P., The Ancient Dominican Foundations of Ireland, 1902, doubts Earl Richard was founder, suggesting instead that the foundation occurred during the time of Walter or Roland Joyce, Dominican Archbishops of Armagh, 1307-1311 and 1311-1322) dissolved before 1541; disputed between Dominican Friars and Franciscan Friars 1670s Dominican Friars to 18th century, transferred to Dundalk	St Malachy	54°02′17″N 6°11′05″W
Cluain-brain Monastery		early monastic site, founded 5th century by St Patrick	Cluain-braoin; Ernatiensis (Ernaide) (Note: according to Colgan)	
Clonkeen Monastery ^{~}		early monastic site, probably founded by St ColmanCule; also suggested to have been located in County Laois (Note: Mervyn Archdall, Monasticon Hibernicum, 1786, p.593)	Cluain-cain; Cluain-chaoin	
Clonmore Monastery		early monastic site	Cluain-mor-fer-n-arda	
Drogheda Friary^{#}		Franciscan Friars Minor, Conventual founded c.1240-45, possibly by the townsmen or Lord Darcy de Platina (Platten), or by the Plunket family, or Lord Ralph Pippard; Observant Franciscan Friars reformed not later than 1506 — possibly initially unsuccessfully; reformed 1518; dissolved 1540, surrendered by Richard MOlane, the guardian, 20 March 1540, granted to Richard Aylmer c.1545; friars possibly in occupation until c.1546, abandoned until a new house was erected 1610	Droched-atha; Droichead-atha; Pontana	
Drogheda Priory Hospital — St Mary de Urso		Crutched Friars founded c.1206 by Ursus de Suamel as a hospital for the poor and infirm, initially under a warden, possibly not under the Cruciferi until later; (Note: James Ware, De Hibernia, et Antiquitatibus ejus, edition of 1654) dissolved 1540; granted to the mayor etc of Drogheda 1556	St Mary de Urso ____________________; St Mary d'Urso Abbey; The Old Abbey	53°42′55″N 6°21′23″W
Drogheda Priory Hospital — St Laurence		Crutched Friars founded c.1202-1203 by the mayor of Drogheda, lepers transferred from St Mary Magdalen hospital c.1202; dissolved 1540; granted to the Mayor etc of Drogheda 1556	St Laurence the Martyr	
Drogheda Priory Hospital — St John the Baptist		Crutched Friars founded before 1216 (during the reign of King John), possibly by Walter de Lacy; dissolved 1539, surrendered 26 July 1539; granted to James Sedgrave before 1554 (during the reign of Edward VI)	St John Baptist	
Drogheda — St Laurence's Franciscan Friary ^		Franciscan Friars founded 1840; dissolved 2000; granted to the Corporation of Drogheda (now Drogheda Borough Council); currently in use as an art gallery, Highlanes Gallery	St Laurence	53°42′55″N 6°20′55″W
Drogheda White Friars		Carmelite Friars founded after 1272 (during the reign of Edward I) by inhabitants of the English colony; dissolved c.1539; demolished by 11 October 1540; farmed out 1548; friars returned to the town a few years before 1642; convent not recorded as being in existence 1739-59; church rebuilt 1807	St Mary	53°42′38″N 6°20′50″W
Drogheda Black Friars		Dominican Friars founded 1224 by Luke Netterville, Archbishop of Armagh, purportedly buried here; Regular Observant Dominican Friars reformed 1484; dissolved 1540, surrendered by Prior Peter Lewis, 20 March 1540 by which time the church and most of dorter were ruinous	St Mary Magdalene	53°43′05″N 6°21′03″W
Drogheda Abbey?		Benedictine monks founded before 1171, confirmed 1188;; dissolved after 1238, united with Mellifont between 1238 and 1329	The Blessed Virgin Mary	
Drogheda Augustinian Friary *		Augustinian Canons Regular founded 1866; extant	St Augustine	53°42′52″N 6°20′58″W
Drogheda Augustinian Priory		Augustinian Canons Regular founded c.1188; dependent on Llanthony, confirmed 1188 and c.1207; quasi-collegiate before 1230; dissolved c.1549?	St Peter	
Drogheda Nunnery				
Drogheda Preceptory?		Knights Templar tenements probably a frankhouse		
Dromin Monastery		early monastic site, possibly founded by St Findian	Druim-fioinnl; Druim-finn; Druim-hIng	53°50′40″N 6°26′08″W
Dromiskin Monastery		early monastic site founded 5th century by St Patrick	St Lugaid; St Rónán mac Beraig ____________________; Druim-enesclaind; Druim-ineascluin; Drumiskin	53°55′19″N 6°23′52″W
Drumcar Monastery		early monastic site, founded by St Fintan; possibly not continuing after 11th century	Druim-caradh; Druim-cara	53°51′33″N 6°22′38″W
Drumshallon Priory Cell		purported early monastic site (Note: References in Mervyn Archdall, Monasticon Hibernicum, 1786, p.461, are actually regarding Dromiskin); Augustinian Canons Regular — Arroasian dependent on Holy Trinity, Dublin; founded c.1202; suppressed by Albert, Archbishop of Armagh between 1240 and 1244, the church becoming parochial; confirmed to Holy Trinity, Dublin 1244; dissolved after 1262	St Mary ____________________; Druim salen; Druim-salfind	53°47′26″N 6°20′29″W
Dundalk Priory Hospital		possible hospital founded 1160, possibly granted to a de Verdon before 1189; Crutched Friars, brethren and sisters founded before 1189? (during the reign of King John) by Nicholas de Verdon, or (at the end of the reign of Henry II) by Bertram de Verdon; dissolved1539, surrendered by Prior Patrick Galtrym, with the consent of the convent, 23 November 1539 (or 23 November 1540); held by Henry Draycott during the reign of Queen Mary until surrendered it 12 September 1557	St Leonard ____________________; Dun-dealgan; Dun-delca; Srathbaile; Stradbhaile; Stradvalle; Traigh-bhaile-duine-dealgan	
Dundalk Franciscan Friary		Franciscan Friars Minor, Conventual founded before 1246 (during the reign of Henry III) by John de Verdon, or his mother Rohesa de Verdon, wife of Theobald Butler; dissolved c.1540; demolished by Lord Grey, the king's deputy by 6 October 1540; granted to James Brandon 1543; friars' community apparently remained in the vicinity Observant Franciscan Friars refounded 1556; dissolved 1563, destroyed and friars expelled by the Protestants 1563 new friary built 1626 (see immediately below)		54°00′21″N 6°23′51″W
Dundalk Franciscan Friary		Observant Franciscan Friars founded 1626 — on finding establishment of Carmelites the Franciscans petitioned for prior rights, upheld by inquiry 1633, ratified by Rome 1638		
Dundalk Carmelite Friars		Carmelite Friars founded before 1626; dissolved, Franciscan Friars' petition for prior rights upheld 1633		
Dunleer Monastery		early monastic site, founded 6th or 7th century by St Forodran; raided on several occasions by Norsemen and by others; burnt 1148	Lann-leire; Lan-leri; Linnleire; Loinleire	
Ernaide Monastery ^{~≈}		early monastic site, oratory?, possibly located in County Louth	Ernaensis; Urney?; Nurney? Furney?; Cluainbraoin?	
Faughart Monastery		early monastic site, nuns, founded by St Darerca (Moninne)	Fochard; Faugher	54°03′05″N 6°23′03″W
Faughart Monastery? ^{ø}		purported early monastic site, monks (Note: Mervyn Archdall, Monasticon Hibernicum, 1786, p.464; Trias Thaumaturga, edited by John Colgan, 1647)		
Kellystown Priory		Augustinian nuns — Arroasian — from Termonfeckin founded after 1507; dissolved c.1517, nuns returned to Termonfeckin;	Calliaghtown; Kaylaghton	
Kilsaran Preceptory		Knights Templar founded 12th century by Matilda de Lacy; dissolved 1308-10; granged to Richard de Burgo, Earl of Ulster; Knights Hospitaller founded after 1314, probably surrendered to the Hospitallers by Richard de Burgo dissolved after 1515; held by Sir Oliver Plunkett by 1541; granted to Sir Thomas Plunkett, Lord of Louth 1570; apparently subsequently passed to the Bellew family	Cell-sarain	53°53′32″N 6°24′11″W
Knock Abbey		Augustinian Canons Regular — Arroasian founded before 1148 Donough O'Carroll, King of Oriel and Edan O'Kelly (later, bishop of Clogher); church consecrated 1148; dissolved 1539; granted to Sir James Gernon of Killencowle, who surrendered it 1558	St Peter and St Paul ____________________; Cnoc-na-sengan	
Linns Monastery		early monastic site, founded before 700 by Colman (Mocholmoc) captured by the Norsemen 841, who built a fortress at the site; (some references mistake Linns for Magheralin, County Down)	Linn-duachail; Linn-hUachaille	
Louth Priory		early monastic site, founded 5th century, possibly by St Patrick for St Mochta, a Briton; frequently plundered and destroyed by Norsemen and by others; Edan O'Kelly, Bishop of Oriel, translated his see from Clogher to Louth, monastery elevated to cathedral status; Augustinian Canons Regular founded 1140-8; burnt 1148; Augustinian Canons Regular — Arroasian refounded 1148 by Donough O'Carroll, King of Oriel, and Edan O'Kelly; (probably remained Arroasian until 13th century); burnt 1152; burnt 1160; burnt and laid waste 1166; see translated to Clogherc.1192; Augustinian Canons Regular; 13th century?; dissolved 1539, surrendered by Prior John Wylley (Welle) 20 November 1539; granted to Oliver Plunkett, Baron of Louth 1541; (NM)	St Mary ____________________; Lughmhagh; Lugmaid; Lugbad	53°57′12″N 6°32′38″W
Louth Abbey		Dominican Friars		53°57′12″N 6°32′39″W
Mellifont Abbey		Cistercian monks founded 1142, site selected by St Malachy, grtanted by Donough O'Carroll, King of Oriel (buried here); church consecrated 1157dissolved 1539, surrendered 23 July 1539 by Abbot Richard Contour; converted into a house 1556; occupied by Edward More 1566; (NM)	Old Mellifont Abbey; Fons Mellis; Mainister-mor-Droichet-Atta; Drogheda	53°44′32″N 6°27′59″W
Mellifont Nunnery		Cistercian? nuns foundation and status unknown; dissolved c.1228		
Monasterboice Abbey		early monastic site, monks founded before 523 (or before 519) by St Buite; plundered 970 by Domnall, King of Ireland; Benedictine monks? 10th century — Danish converts	Monaster-buite; Manister	53°46′39″N 6°25′04″W
Monasterboice Nunnery		early monastic site, nuns founded before 523 (or before 519) by St Buite, separate from the monks site	Monaster-buite; Manister	
Roosky Priory		Knights Templar? possible preceptory — property here owned by the knights	The Priory	
Templetown Camera		Knights Templar founded late 12th century, manor granted by Matilda de Lacy; dissolved 1308-11; Knights Hospitaller apparently managed by Kilsaran Preceptory, supra dissolved after 1515?	Ballug; Coly; Cooley; Cowley	
Rosmakea		(to the south of Dundalk) - Franciscan Friars here for a time		
Termonfeckin Abbey		early monastic site, founded 7th century (665?) by St Feching of Fore; plundered 1025; Augustinian Canons Regular — Arroasian, possible double-monastery with nuns refounded c.1144, probably by Donchad (or Donough) O'Carroll, King of Oriel, at the behest of St Malachy and Bishop Edan O'Kelly; dissolved before 1195, church of St Fechin in parochial use, conventual church dedicated to St Mary; Augustinian nuns — Arroasian before 1195 dependent on Odder; refounded c.1383? dissolved 1539, surrendered by Mary Hubbard, Abbess; leased to Catherine Bruton 1578	St Mary	53°45′31″N 6°16′10″W

The following location in County Louth lacks monastic connection:
* Knock Abbey (Note: Knock Abbey, County Louth: Buildings of Ireland: National Inventory of Architectural Heritage)

== Map link to lists of monastic houses in Ireland by county ==
Click on a county to go to the corresponding article.	Antrim; Armagh; Down; Fermanagh; Londonderry; Tyrone; Carlow; Cavan; Clare; Cork; Donegal; Dublin; Galway; Kerry; Kildare; Kilkenny; Laois; Leitrim; Limerick; Longford; Louth; Mayo; Meath; Monaghan; Offaly; Roscommon; Sligo; Tipperary; Waterford; Westmeath; Wexford; Wicklow

== See also ==
- List of monastic houses in Ireland
