= List of monastic houses in County Cavan =

The smaller establishments such as monastic cells and notable monastic granges (particularly those with resident monks) and camerae of the military orders of monks (Knights Templars and Knights Hospitallers) are included. The numerous monastic hospitals per se are not included here unless at some time the foundation had, or was purported to have, the status or function of an abbey, priory, or preceptory/commandery.

== Layout ==
Communities/provenance: shows the status and communities existing at each establishment, together with such dates as have been established as well as the fate of the establishment after dissolution, and the current status of the site.

Formal name or dedication: shows the formal name of the establishment or the person in whose name the church is dedicated, where known.

Alternative names: some of the establishments have had alternative names over the course of time. In order to assist in text-searching such alternatives in name or spelling have been provided.

== Abbreviations and key ==
The sites listed are ruins or fragmentary remains unless indicated thus:
*	current monastic function
+	current non-monastic ecclesiastic function
^	current non-ecclesiastic function
=	remains incorporated into later structure
#	no identifiable trace of the monastic foundation remains
~	exact site of monastic foundation unknown
ø	possibly no such monastic foundation at location
¤	no such monastic foundation
≈	identification ambiguous or confused

Locations with names in italics indicate probable duplication (misidentification with another location) or non-existent foundations (either erroneous reference or proposed foundation never implemented).

Trusteeship denoted as follows:
NIEA	Scheduled Monument (NI)
NM	National Monument (ROI)
C.I.	Church of Ireland
R.C.	Roman Catholic Church

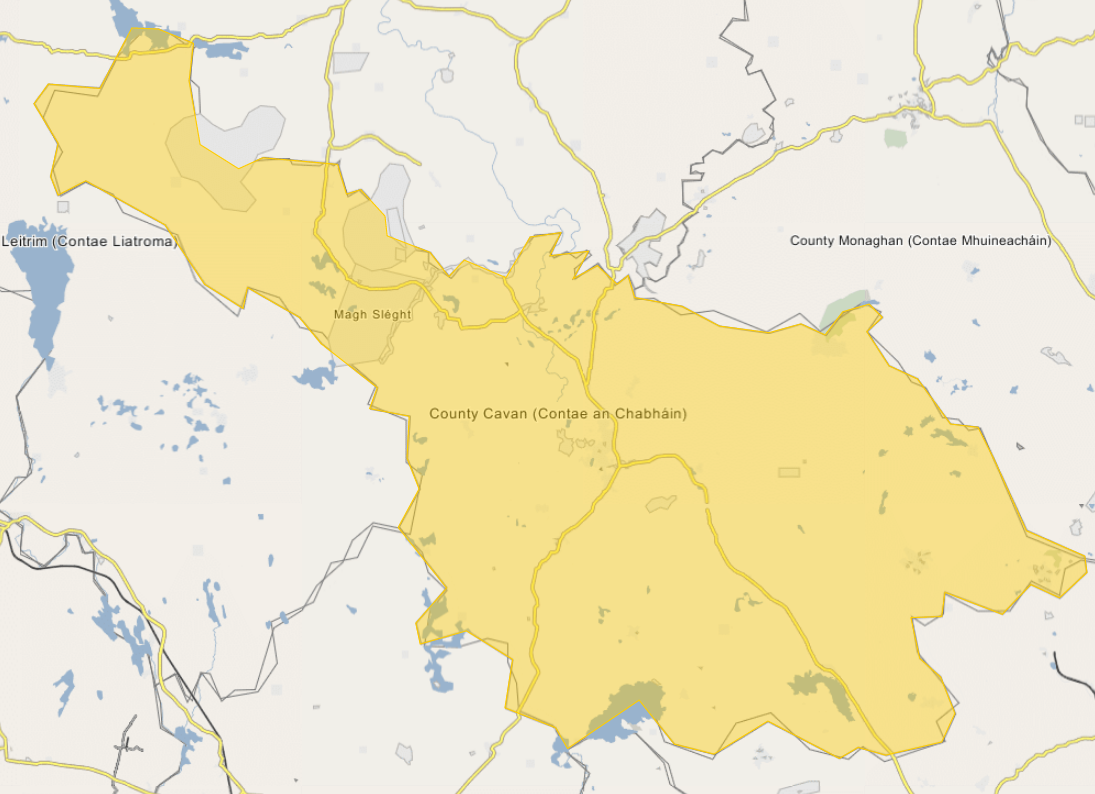
Locations of monastic houses in County Cavan

Foundation	Image	Communities & provenance	Formal name or dedication & alternative names	References & location
Belturbet Monastery		early monastic site; remains of round tower 1906 (Note: John Cooke, Handbook for Travellers in Ireland, 1910, VII, Places of Interest, p.lvi)		
Cavan Friary		claims of Dominican Friars prior to Franciscans (Note: Cavan Dominicans — Thomas de Burgo, Hibernica Dominicana (ed. 1762), and others) — evidence lacking; Franciscan Friars, Third Order Regular founded c.1325-30 by Giolla O'Reilly (Gila-Isu Roe O'Reilly, Lord of Muintur-Maelmordha); Observant Franciscan Friars reformed 1499 or 1502 (1503); destroyed by fire with much of the town 1576, by a woman of the O'Reilly family; refounded dissolved 1608	The Friary Church of the Blessed Virgin Mary, Cavan ____________________; Cabhan; Brefinium	53°59′23″N 7°21′43″W
Drumlane Priory		Gaelic monks founded before 550, probably by St Colmcille (reputedly founded by St Maidoc, Bishop of Ferns, though already flourishing when he was born); Augustinian Canons Regular — Arroasian dependent on Kells, Meath; founded 1143-8?; dissolved 1570; granted for a term of 21 years to Hugh O'Reilly, head of the Brenie sept c.1570; nave still used for Divine Service until early 19th century	The Priory Church of Saint Mary, Drumlane ____________________; Drumlane Abbey; Dromlahan	54°03′33″N 7°28′40″W
Killinagh Monastery		early monastic site, founded early 6th century traditionally by St Brigid and St Laighne	Killineach	54°17′11″N 7°54′42″W
Killachad Abbey		founded before 800 by St Tigernach; plundered by the English late 12th century		
Kilmore Abbey ^{#+}		Gaelic monks founded 885 traditionally by St Fedlemid, who transferred his community from Slanore; parochial church built on site; raised to episcopal diocesan cathedral status 1452; new parochial church built 19th century, incorporating remnants believed to originate from the monastic site at Trinity Island; now the Church of Ireland cathedral		53°58′47″N 7°24′51″W
Lough Oughter Abbey, Trinity Island		early monastic site; possible episcopal diocesan cathedral prior to transfer to Kilmore; Premonstratensian Canons daughter house of Loughkey; island granted to Loughkey by Cathal O'Reilly founded 1237 by Clarus MacMailin (MacMoylon), Archdeacon of Elphin; canons brought from Loughkey 1250; lost conventual status 1412; restored and regained conventual status 1444; granted for a period of 21 years to Hugh O'Reilly, Head of the Brenie sept 1570; found in 1585 that no payment received for over eleven years; dissolved 1585, though canons remained in occupation; ruinous by 1646	Trinity Priory; Loch-uachtair; Locha-uachtair; Lochwochdayr; Ballineval?	53°59′11″N 7°27′47″W
Slanore Monastery		Gaelic monks founded early 6th century by Colman mac Echdach; suggested to have been episcopal diocesan cathedral; (Note: Slanore Cathedral: O. Davies, Journal, Royal Society of Antiquaries of Ireland, lxxviii p.99) transferred to Kilmore by St Fedlemid	Snamluthir	53°58′34″N 7°28′18″W
Tomregan Monastery		Gaelic monks; traces of church and round tower (Note: Tomregan remains — Lord Killanin & M. V. Duignan, Shell Guide to Ireland, 1962, (new edition 1967), p.83)	Tuaim-dreacon; Tomregin	54°06′59″N 7°35′43″W
Urney Monastery		Gaelic monks; remains purported to be a church of the Bishop of Triburna (Kilmore) (Note: Urney Monastery remains — J. Meehan, The Catholic Encyclopedia, 1913-14, viii, p.643)	Urnaide	54°02′55″N 7°24′15″W

== Map link to lists of monastic houses in Ireland by county ==
Click on a county to go to the corresponding article.	Antrim; Armagh; Down; Fermanagh; Londonderry; Tyrone; Carlow; Cavan; Clare; Cork; Donegal; Dublin; Galway; Kerry; Kildare; Kilkenny; Laois; Leitrim; Limerick; Longford; Louth; Mayo; Meath; Monaghan; Offaly; Roscommon; Sligo; Tipperary; Waterford; Westmeath; Wexford; Wicklow

== See also ==
- List of monastic houses in Ireland
