= List of monastic houses in County Sligo =

The smaller establishments such as monastic cells and notable monastic granges (particularly those with resident monks) and camerae of the military orders of monks (Knights Templars and Knights Hospitallers) are included. The numerous monastic hospitals per se are not included here unless at some time the foundation had, or was purported to have, the status or function of an abbey, priory, or preceptory/commandery.

== Layout ==
Communities/provenance: shows the status and communities existing at each establishment, together with such dates as have been established as well as the fate of the establishment after dissolution, and the current status of the site.

Formal name or dedication: shows the formal name of the establishment or the person in whose name the church is dedicated, where known.

Alternative names: some of the establishments have had alternative names over the course of time. In order to assist in text-searching such alternatives in name or spelling have been provided.

== Abbreviations and key ==
The sites listed are ruins or fragmentary remains unless indicated thus:
*	current monastic function
+	current non-monastic ecclesiastic function
^	current non-ecclesiastic function
=	remains incorporated into later structure
#	no identifiable trace of the monastic foundation remains
~	exact site of monastic foundation unknown
ø	possibly no such monastic foundation at location
¤	no such monastic foundation
≈	identification ambiguous or confused

Locations with names in italics indicate probable duplication (misidentification with another location) or non-existent foundations (either erroneous reference or proposed foundation never implemented).

Trusteeship denoted as follows:
NIEA	Scheduled Monument (NI)
NM	National Monument (ROI)
C.I.	Church of Ireland
R.C.	Roman Catholic Church

Foundation	Image	Communities & provenance	Formal name or dedication & alternative names	References & location
Achonry Monastery		early monastic site, founded 7th century by St Finnian of Clonard; diocesan cathedral 1152	Achadh-conaire; Achadh-caoin; Achada; Cluain-Cain-i-n-Achud	54°04′41″N 8°39′16″W
Achonry Abbey		"Abbey (in ruins)" (Note: Ordnance Survey)	Achadh-conaire; Achadh-caoin; Achada; Cluain-Cain-i-n-Achud	54°04′45″N 8°39′19″W
Aghanagh Monastery		early monastic site, founded 5th century by St Patrick for Bishop Manus (Maine) and Gentene	Achanagh; Each-aineach; Each-enach	54°02′07″N 8°19′55″W
Alternan Monastery		early monastic site, founded 6th century by St Colmcille or St Farranan; granted to St Farranan by St Colmcille	Alt-fharannain	54°16′12″N 8°53′52″W
Annaghloy Abbey		"Abbey", (Note: Memorial Atlas of Ireland) unknown foundation, order or period; Lough Arrow		54°02′40″N 8°18′24″W
Athmoy Cell		Premonstratensian Canons dependent on Loughkey; cell, probably non-conventual, founded 1232 by Clarus MacMailin, archdeacon of Elphin; dissolved before 1594; granted to Robert Harrison 1594	Holy Trinity ____________________; Ath Mugi; Killamoy; Foyoges	54°04′08″N 8°15′21″W
Aughris Priory		early monastic site, founded by St Molaise of Inishmurray; Augustinian Canons Regular founded before 1172? by the Macdonalds, Irish noblemen; dissolved c.1584	St Mary ____________________; Eachros; Acharas; Agharois; Akeras; Keras; Kilmaltin; Inishmurray; Insula Mary	54°16′23″N 8°46′03″W
Ballindoon Priory		Dominican Friars possibly licensed from Athenry 1427 founded 1507 purportedly by a Mac Donogh, begun by Thomas O'Farrell; founded 1507; dissolved c. 1585; granted to Sir Francis Crofton (Grofton) after 1591, assigned to Sir Robert King	St Mary ____________________; Ballindoon Abbey; Baile-an-duin; Ballin-dune	54°04′58″N 8°19′24″W
Ballinley Abbey ^{≈?}		suggested Cistercian monks prior to settling at Boyle — dubious; "ruins of an abbey"	Ballinlig; Bunnina/Bunfinny (dubious)	
Ballymote Friary		Franciscan Friars, Third Order Regular founded before 1442 by Cugawrag M'Donough; burned, plundered and exiled by Donarus Macdonkayd 1483; dissolved before 1584; granted to Sir Henry Broncard, assigned to Sir William Taafe; destroyed by rebels c. 1584-6; Dominican Friars (Note: Pat. R. James I, pt.2, p.52)	Baile-an-mhota; Baile-in-mota; Ath-cliath-in-chorain; Balemouta	54°05′23″N 8°31′06″W
Ballymote Preceptory ^{~}		suggested Knights Hospitaller — possibly Temple House, infra	Temple House?	
Ballynagalliagh Priory		nuns at Keelty possibly transferred here; Augustinian nuns — Arroasian dependent on Kilcreevanty; founded after 1223?; dissolved before 1562?; granted to the Earl of Clanricarde 1562		54°20′53″N 8°30′17″W
Ballysadare Abbey		early monastic site, founded 7th century by St Fechin of Fore; Augustinian Canons Regular — Arroasian? founded before 1166?; dissolved 1588?; leased to Bryan FitzWilliam 1588; Augustinian Friars	St Mary (and St Fechin) ___________________; Baile-essa-dara; Assadare; Astrura; Esdara; Templemore	54°12′54″N 8°31′04″W
Banada Priory		Augustinian Friars founded 1423 by Donough O'Hara (Donatus Heagiaa) (son of John (Joannis Pheadgra)) who granted site; Observant Augustinian Friars reform adopted by decree of the prior general 29 December 1423 dissolved c.1613; founded 1423; dissolved c.1613; Irish Sisters of Charity founded 1858	Corpus Christi ____________________; Beannada; Bennatta; Benfada	54°02′15″N 8°49′02″W
Billa Monastery		early monastic site, founded 7th century by St Fechin of Fore	Bile-Fechin; Bile-fobhair	54°10′32″N 8°33′19″W
Buniffi Abbey ^{~}		Cistercian monks founded c.1158/9, transferred from Drumconaid; probably Bunfhinne, Dromard Parish, County Sligo; dissolved 1161, transferred to Boyle	Bunfinny; Bunnina; Bunfhinne	
Caille-au-inde Monastery ^{~≈?}		early monastic site, founded by St Fintan, son of Aid; possibly located in County Sligo, also suggested to be Cally, Perthshire	Caille-aibhinne; Caille-eavinde	
Carricknahorna Monastery		early monastic site, nuns, founded 5th century by St Patrick for Macet, Cergen, Rodanus and Matona	Tech-na-gCailleach-dubha; Senchell-damaigi; Senella-cella-dumiche? nr Corradoo	54°01′32″N 8°21′42″W
Church Island Monastery, Lough Gill		early monastic site, founded 6th century (in the time of St Colmcille) by St Loman, son of Dallan; burned 1416	Inis-mor	54°15′13″N 8°23′12″W
Cloghermore Nunnery ^{~}		nuns — order, foundation and period unknown		
Cloonameehan Friary		Dominican Friars founded 1488 by Eugene Mac Donogh, license granted by Pope Innocent VIII 1488, on petition of Mac Donogh, the Baron of Norach and Edmund de Lantu; dissolved c.1584; granted to Richard Kyndelinshe (Kindlemersh); passed to the Taaffes, then to the Earl of Shelburne	Clonymeaghan; Cloonmahen; Cloonoghil	54°03′37″N 8°35′26″W
Cloonoghill Abbey		early monastic site, founded 6th century by Aedan O Fiachrach in Corran	Cluain-eochaill nr Ballyangloch	54°04′19″N 8°33′16″W
Court Friary		Franciscan Friars, Third Order Regular founded after 1449 by Father Andrew O'Clumhain (Coleman), land granted by John O'Hara, with the approval of Cornelius O'Moghan, Bishop of Achonry; dissolved 1588; granted to Richard Kyndelinshe 1588; granted to William Taaffe 1598; granted to Francis Edgworth 1623/4	Abbey Court; Cooit; Cuit-ruardri; Cuirtwilleag	54°06′43″N 8°40′05″W
Dromard Monastery		early monastic site, nuns, traditionally founded 5th century by St Patrick	Druim-ard; Druim-n-ard	54°13′56″N 8°38′21″W
Druimlias Monastery ^{≈~}		early monastic site	Drumlease, County Leitrim?	
Druimeidirdhaloch Monastery ^{≈~}		early monastic site, founded by St Finnian of Clonard	Kildalough?	
Druimnea Monastery ^{~}		early monastic site, founded 5th century by St Patrick; possibly located in County Sligo		
Drumcliff Monastery		early monastic site, founded 575 by St Colmcille, site granted by Ard son of Ainmire; plundered 1315; probably dissolved c.1503; N15 road now bisects the site	Druim-cliabh	54°19′33″N 8°29′40″W
Drumcolumb Monastery		early monastic site, founded 6th century by St Colmcille for his disciple Finbarr	Druim-coluim; Druim-namac	54°07′45″N 8°20′52″W
Drumrat Monastery		early monastic site, founded 7th century by St Fechin of Fore	Druim-raite	54°01′42″N 8°28′42″W (approx)
Easky Abbey ^{ø}		"Abbey (in ruins)"		54°17′10″N 8°57′36″W
Emlaghfad Monastery		early monastic site, founded 6th century by St Colmcille for Enna, son of Nuadhain	Imblech-foda; Emlyfad; Tulach-segsa; Tulach-segra	54°06′29″N 8°29′19″W
Enachard Monastery		early monastic site, nuns; purportedly transferred to Clogher	Annaghard; Clogher?	54°16′29″N 8°23′34″W (?)
Faebhran Monastery ^{~≈}		suggested early monastic site	Foibren; probably Foyron, County Westmeath	
Inishmore Monastery, Lough Arrow		"monastery" — order, foundation and period unknown	Killadoon	54°04′02″N 8°19′32″W
Inishmurray Monastery		early monastic site, probably founded 5th century (in the time of St Patrick) by St Laisren (Molaise); burned by the Norsemen 807; transferred to the mainland and united with Aughris; probably used as a hermitage into the medieval period	Inis-muridaig	54°25′53″N 8°39′25″W
Keelty Monastery		early monastic site, nuns, founded by St Muadnata?	Caile-nadfrath	54°20′58″N 8°28′20″W (approx?)
Kilcumin Monastery		early monastic site, possibly founded by St Caeman or St Comegen	Kilcomin	54°07′47″N 8°46′17″W (approx)
Kilcumin Friary		Franciscan Friars, Third Order Regular dependent on Court; founded after 1454; dissolved 1588?	Kilcomin	54°07′47″N 8°46′17″W (approx)
Killadoon Priory^{~}		Premonstratensian Canons church belonging to Loughkey	Cell-duibh-duin	
Killaraght Monastery		early monastic site, nuns, founded 5th century by St Patrick; nuns, possibly Augustinian — Arroasian — evidence lacking; dependent on Kilcreevanty?; founded after 1223?; dissolved c.1591?; granted to Terence O'Byrne (Tirlaughe O'Byrnem) 1594; assigned to the Earl of Clanricarde by Terence O'Byrne	Cell-adrochta; Cell-Athracta; Killarighla	53°56′00″N 8°21′08″W (?)
Killaspugbrone Monastery		early monastic site	Caisel-Irrae; Cashel; Cell-espuig-broin; Cell-epscoip-broin	54°16′58″N 8°36′08″W
Killerry Monastery		early monastic site, founded 5th century? (in the time of St Patrick?); erenagh recorded up to 1416	Cell-oiridh	54°13′28″N 8°20′36″W (?)
Kilmacowen Monastery		early monastic site, probably founded before mid 6th century by Diermit, son of Eugenius mac Murchad; granted to Loughkey Abbey c.1239	Rosredheadh	54°13′56″N 8°31′10″W
Kilnemanagh Monastery		early monastic site, founded 7th century by St Fechin of Fore; Augustinian Canons Regular dependent on Ballysadare; cell? founded before 1170?; dissolved before 1400; granted to Richard, Earl of Clanricarde before 1603 (during the reign of Queen Elizabeth)	Cell-na-manach	54°10′33″N 8°33′19″W
Kilross Monastery		early monastic site Premonstratensian Canons daughter of Loughkey; founded 1233-5 by Clarus MacMailin; evidently non-conventual; dissolved before 1594; granted to Robert Harrison 1594; ruins in existence 1890	Holy Trinity ____________________; Cell-fhraes; Cell-rass; Cell-Rais; Kil-ruisse	54°12′03″N 8°27′12″W
Knockmore Monastery		Carmelite Friars founded c.1320; also given as Dominican Friars — probable erroneous interpretation of the reference to the Carmelites here as "black friars"; dissolved before 1594	Grand Mont	54°00′41″N 8°34′01″W
Monasteraden Monastery		early monastic site, founded by St Aedhan (probably Aedhan O Fiachrach)		53°56′28″N 8°30′08″W
Monaster-Cheathramh-nTeampuill Monastery		early monastic site		53°58′02″N 8°34′21″W
Scurmor Friary		Augustinian Friars founded before 1454, site granted by Thady Odubha (O'Dowda) on petition of friars Eugene Ocaemayn (O'Knavin) and Thady Macfirbissyg (MacFirbis); dissolved before 1603? (during the reign of Queen Elizabeth?); masonry purportedly used to construct a house for the landlord, later converted for use as a hotel	Holy Trinity ____________________; Inis-tormor; Inis-morensis; Instuamor	54°11′48″N 9°06′50″W
Shancough Monastery		early monastic site, possibly founded 5th century by St Patrick	Seanchua-ua-n-oiliolla; Senchua	
Skreen Monastery		early monastic site, founded 6th century by St Colmcille who was granted site to found a monastery by Tibrad, prince of Tir Fiachrach; site occupied by remains of medieval church	Scrin-adamnain; Scrinium S. Adamnani; Scrine	54°14′27″N 8°43′49″W
Sligo Friary		Dominican Friars founded 1252 by Maurice fitz Gerald; consecrated 1253; burned down accidentally 1414; rebuilt 1416 by br Brian, son of Dermot Mac Donogh; dissolved 1595, judged to be property of the Crown, friars probably dispersed at this time; granted to William Taaffe by James I; in use as a court house 1608; friars probably restored by 1624; destroyed, friars seeking refuge in caves and woods in the vicinity during 1630s; friars restored by 1641; Premonstratensian Canons; (NM)	Priory of the Holy Cross ____________________ 'Sligo Abbey' ; Sliccech; Sligech; Selgia	54°16′15″N 8°28′12″W
Sligo Priory *		Dominican Friars church dedicated 6 January 1848; priory built 1865; rebuilt and re-dedicated 13 May 1973; extant	Holy Cross Priory, Sligo	
Staad Abbey		early monastic site, reputedly founded by St Molaise of Inishmurray; possible cell of Innishmurray	Teampall-na-staide; Steedagh	54°23′27″N 8°34′18″W
Tawnagh Monastery		early monastic site, founded 5th century by St Patrick and Bishop Cairell	Tamnach	54°06′27″N 8°24′08″W
Temple House		Knights Templar founded after 1269 (during the reign of Henry III); dissolved 1270?, retaining a church and property in the area after the destruction of the castle; Knights Hospitaller 342; probably passed to the Crutched Friars of Rindown after 1312	Tech-Temple; Taght-tampul; Domuis Templi; Templehouse; Loghnehely	54°07′02″N 8°34′29″W
Toomour Monastery		early monastic site	Tuaim-fobhair; Cell-Easpaig-Luidhigh; Cell-epscoip-buidhidh	

== Map link to lists of monastic houses in Ireland by county ==
Click on a county to go to the corresponding article.	Antrim; Armagh; Down; Fermanagh; Londonderry; Tyrone; Carlow; Cavan; Clare; Cork; Donegal; Dublin; Galway; Kerry; Kildare; Kilkenny; Laois; Leitrim; Limerick; Longford; Louth; Mayo; Meath; Monaghan; Offaly; Roscommon; Sligo; Tipperary; Waterford; Westmeath; Wexford; Wicklow

== See also ==
- List of monastic houses in Ireland
