= List of monastic houses in County Wexford =

The smaller establishments such as monastic cells and notable monastic granges (particularly those with resident monks) and camerae of the military orders of monks (Knights Templars and Knights Hospitallers) are included. The numerous monastic hospitals per se are not included here unless at some time the foundation had, or was purported to have, the status or function of an abbey, priory, or preceptory/commandery.

== Layout ==
Communities/provenance: shows the status and communities existing at each establishment, together with such dates as have been established as well as the fate of the establishment after dissolution, and the current status of the site.

Formal name or dedication: shows the formal name of the establishment or the person in whose name the church is dedicated, where known.

Alternative names: some of the establishments have had alternative names over the course of time. In order to assist in text-searching such alternatives in name or spelling have been provided.

== Abbreviations and key ==
The sites listed are ruins or fragmentary remains unless indicated thus:
*	current monastic function
+	current non-monastic ecclesiastic function
^	current non-ecclesiastic function
=	remains incorporated into later structure
#	no identifiable trace of the monastic foundation remains
~	exact site of monastic foundation unknown
ø	possibly no such monastic foundation at location
¤	no such monastic foundation
≈	identification ambiguous or confused

Locations with names in italics indicate probable duplication (misidentification with another location) or non-existent foundations (either erroneous reference or proposed foundation never implemented).

Trusteeship denoted as follows:
NIEA	Scheduled Monument (NI)
NM	National Monument (ROI)
C.I.	Church of Ireland
R.C.	Roman Catholic Church

Foundation	Image	Communities & provenance	Formal name or dedication & alternative names	References & location
Ahacortensis Friary ^{≈}		possible duplication of Enniscorthy or Annaghdown; Augustinian Canons Regular (if Enniscorthy, infra); Augustinian Friars	Enniscorthy?; Annaghdown?, County Galway	
Arbrensis Monastery ^{≈}		early monastic site, possibly located in County Wexford		
Ardamine Monastery		early monastic site, founded by St Maedoc of Ferns, granted to St Maedoc by Dyma	?Ardladrann; Ardlabran	52°37′27″N 6°15′20″W (approx)
Ardcavan Monastery ^{#}		early monastic site, founded 7th century? by St Coeman mac Colman, or Colmad, brother of St Degan?; plundered 819; erenagh land into mid-11th century	Airdne-Coemhain; Ardne-Coemhain; Dairinis Coembain	52°21′32″N 6°26′12″W
Ardcolm Monastery		early monastic site, founded 6th century by St Colmcille	Airdne-coluim	52°22′23″N 6°25′55″W
Ballyhack Preceptory		Knights Hospitaller founded before 1212; dissolved after 1375, merged with Kilcloggan; now the site of Ballyhack Castle	Balicauk	52°14′45″N 6°58′03″W
Ballynaleek Monastery		early monastic site, founded by St Mael Ruain of Tallaght?	St Mael Ruain of Tallaght _____________________; Ballinaleck	52°22′59″N 6°29′41″W (approx)
Begerin Priory		early monastic site and school, founded 5th century by St Ibar; dissolved 1160; Benedictine monks priory cell dependent on Exeter founded 1181; dissolved 1400 transferred to Augustinian Canons Regular of Selskar — though no record of cell here	Becc-eriu; Begeire; Beggerin	52°22′07″N 6°24′34″W
Camaross Monastery		early monastic site, founded 6th century by St Abban	Camacross; Camros	
Carnsore Monastery		early monastic site, Gaelic monks, founded before 585 by St Vogue (Veoc?)		52°10′38″N 6°21′45″W
Clonatin Priory		Augustinian Canons Regular; Romanesque ruins purported to be cell of Ferns Abbey		52°41′05″N 6°16′41″W
Clonmines Friary		Augustinian Friars founded 1317; dissolved 1539, surrendered by Prior Nicholas Wadding; granted to Laurence Newell (Nevill) 1 May 1540 granted to John Parker 1543, who had licence to alienate 1546 friars expelled 1544, and roamed the countryside for the next three centuries; erroneously purported transferred to Dominican Friars	Clomin; Granstown	52°15′40″N 6°45′49″W
Clonmore Monastery		early monastic site, founded by St Maedoc of Ferns	Cluain-mor-dicholla-gairb	52°26′06″N 6°38′43″W
Coolgraney Friary		possible Augustinian Friars; site probably occupied by St Austin's church, Inch		
Down Priory		Augustinian Canons Regular founded before 1170, purportedly by the Danes; (Note: Louis Augustin Alemand, Monasticum Hibernicum, translated and edited by John Stevens, 1722) dissolved c.1567; leased to Thomas Stewcley 1567; held by Richard Maisterson 1608	Abbeydown; Downing; Dune; Dunum	52°41′43″N 6°37′55″W
Druim-chaoin-cellaig		early monastic site, founded 6th century by St Abban	Druim-cair-ceallaig	
Dunbrody Abbey		Cistercian monks — from St Mary's, Dublin dependent on St Mary's, Dublin; founded 1182, land granted to the abbot and monks of Buildwas by Hervé de Monte Marisco 1171-2, confirmed by his nephew, Strongbow; dissolved 6 May 1536; granted to Sir Osbert Itchingham who apparently never resided there, monks purportedly remained in occupation until they abandoned the priory c.1560?	de Portu St Mariae; St Mariae; de Portu; Dunbroith; Dunbrot	52°17′02″N 6°57′33″W
Dunbrody Priory ^{ø}		purported Benedictine monks — evidence lacking		
Enniscorthy Priory		mission house or chapel founded c.510 by St Senan of Scattery; Augustinian Canons Regular — Victorine dependent on St Thomas's, Dublin; cell founded before 1229; dissolved 1539; leased to Edward Spenser 1581; passed to Richard Synnott 1582; granted to Edward Eustace 1593; passed to Sir Henry Wallop 1595; held by Thomas, Earl of Ormond 1605	St John the Evangelist ____________________; Inis-corthadh; Inis-corty; Inis-choy; St John's	52°29′01″N 6°34′19″W (?)
Enniscorthy Abbey		Franciscan Friars Minor, Conventual founded 1460 by Donal, Fuscus (Donal Reagh Cavanagh); Observant Franciscan Friars reformed c.1460 by Dermit (O Murchu); dissolved 1539; granted to James, Earl of Ormond; destroyed by Henry Wallop 1582; granted to Sir Henry Wallop		52°30′02″N 6°33′58″W
Ferns Abbey		Augustinian Canons Regular — Arroasian founded c.1160-2 by Dermot Mac Murrough, King of Leinster, buried here; burned 1159 or 1166; rebuilt by Dermot 1169; plundered and burned by Scottish raiders and Irish rebels c.1317 dissolved 1538, abbot and canons left the abbey 31 March 1538; granted to Thomas Alen 25 March 1538	St Mary ____________________; Fearna-nor-Maedhog; Ferna-nor-Maedhog; Fernis	52°35′22″N 6°29′31″W
Ferns Cathedral		early monastic site, founded c.6th/7th century by St Aidan or M'Aedhoc (Mogue), first bishop of Ferns; diocesan cathedral 1111		52°35′24″N 6°29′34″W
Ferns — St Aidan’s Monastery of Adoration		Family of Adoration nuns founded 1990, on the site of a parochial church (built 1826) demolished 1970s	St Aidan	
Fethard Abbey		early monastic site, founded 6th century by St Abban, patronized by St Maedoc	Fiodh-ard; Fetherde	52°11′35″N 6°50′22″W
Fethard Friary ^{≈ø}		Augustinian Friars possible duplication of Fethard, County Tipperary	Fetherde; Fethard, County Tipperary?	
Finachia Cell ^{~}		Augustinian Canons Regular possible hermit's cell on land endowed to Ferns, possibly located in County Wexford	Cell Finnmagi?	
Finnmag Monastery ^{~}		early monastic site, founded 6th century by St Abban	Fionmagh	
Glascarrig Priory		Tironensian monks made dependent on St Dogmael's, Wales by Griffin Condon, David Roch and others; founded after 1190 (1190 or 1199); dissolved 1541; church found to be parochial 27 January 1541; leased to Walter Pepard of Kilca 1550; abandoned after 1550, last prior in office until 1558	St Mary ____________________; Glascharrac; Glascarrick	52°34′55″N 6°12′27″W
Grantstown Priory		Augustinian Canons Regular founded 1317		52°15′20″N 6°43′48″W
Horetown Friary		Carmelite Friars founded 1350-87? by the Furlong family, possibly Philip Furlong; dissolved before 1541?; granted to Sir John Davis, assigned to Francis Talbot; friars remained in the district, convent existing c.1737	Hoartown; Little Horetown	52°19′20″N 6°43′00″W (?)
Inisbeg Monastery ^{~}		early monastic site, founded 5th century? (by the time of St Patrick)	Beg-erin?	
Inisdoimle Monastery		early monastic site, founded by St Bairrfhinn, son of Aed, Prince of Dublin; plundered a number of times between 820 and 960	Inis-daimle; Inis-teimple; Inch?	52°17′52″N 6°49′03″W
Inisfail Monastery ^{~}		early monastic site, founded 5th century by St Patrick, to whom land was granted by Cremthann	Inis-feal; Beg-erin?	
Kilbraney Abbey		Franciscan Friars, purportedly Third Order Regular	Abbey Kilbraney; Abbeybraney	52°18′54″N 6°49′29″W
Kilcloggan Preceptory		Knights Templar founded after 1183 (during the reign of King John) by the O'More family, possibly Connor O'More; dissolved 1308-10; Knights Hospitaller founded after 1314; dissolved 1540; leased to James Sherlock of Waterford	Kilcloghan; Templetown	52°10′46″N 6°53′43″W
Kilgorman Monastery		early monastic site, founded 5th century?	Cell-gormain	52°42′34″N 6°10′37″W
Kilnamanagh Monastery		early monastic site	Kilmanagh	52°30′48″N 6°23′19″W (approx)
Lady's Island Priory		Augustinian Canons Regular possible cell of Ferns prior to 14th century; purportedly Augustinian Friars dissolved 17th century? (in the time of Cromwell?)	Our Lady (purportedly)	52°12′29″N 6°22′57″W
New Ross Priory, earlier site		Franciscan Friars Minor, Conventual transferred to later site (see immediately below) before 1295, probably between 1250 and 1256;		
New Ross Priory		early monastic site, founded 6th century by St Abban; Crutched Friars founded c.1195, probably by William Marshall, Earl of Pembroke; dissolved before 1295; Franciscan Friars Minor, Conventual refounded c.1250 (during the reign of Edward I), purportedly by Sir John Devereaux; transferred from earlier site (see immediately above) before 1295; Crutched Friars appear to have attempted to regain the site from the Franciscans 15th century; dissolved 1540; granted to the Earl of Ormond; assigned to Jasper Duffe; friars evicted 1549-50; suppressed 1558, destroyed by the Protestants; apparently reoccupied during the reign of Queen Mary; Observant Franciscan Friars reformed 1612	St Saviour	52°23′47″N 6°56′26″W
New Ross Grey Friars		Observant Franciscan Friars built 1615	Ros-mic-treoin; Ross-meic-treoin; Ross-pont	52°23′45″N 6°56′34″W
New Ross Franciscan Nunnery		Franciscan sisters, Third Order Regular founded between 1625 and 1650		
New Ross Austin Friars		Augustinian Friars founded before 1320, purportedly by Wiliam de la Roche; Observant Augustinian Friars reformed 1484?; dissolved 1540; sold to Margaret, Countess of Ormond and Ossory; leased to John Savage 19 August 1540; granted to Richard Butler of Dormereston 16 January 1544; friars later returned to New Ross (see immediately below)		
New Ross Austin Friars *		Augustinian Friars extant		
New Ross, St Mary's Abbey		Anglo-Norman abbey parish church; suggested episcopal diocesan cathedral, Patrick Barrett, Bishop of Ferns, purportedly translated his see to St Mary's church 1400 to 1415 — references probably only pertain to the bishop's residence	Monastery of St Saviour	52°23′46″N 6°56′28″W
New Ross, Mount Carmel Monastery		Carmelite nuns		52°23′44″N 6°56′09″W
Pill Friary ^{~}		Franciscan Friars, Third Order Regular foundation unknown; dissolved before 1603 (during the reign of Queen Elizabeth) 274	Pillam	52°20′03″N 6°36′15″W (approx)
Rathaspick Monastery		early monastic site	Raith-ne-n-epscop	52°18′28″N 6°29′42″W (approx)
Rosslare Priory		Augustinian Canons Regular		
St Saviour's Priory ^{~≈?}		Cistercian monks dependent on Dunbrody; possibly located in County Wexford; possible confusion with Graiguenamanagh	St Salvator	
Selskar Priory		Augustinian Canons Regular — Holy Sepulchre? purportedly founded c.1190 by Sir Alexander de la Roche, after 1216?; dissolved 1540, surrendered by Prior John Heigharne 23 March 1540; occupied by Sir Walter Browne of Malrankan before 1548; granted to John Parker 1548; Augustinian Friars	The Priory of SS Peter and Paul of Selsker by Wexford ____________________; Wexford Priory; Loch-Garman; Loch-Carmen; Weysford; Veyesereford; Viesercford	52°20′29″N 6°27′56″W
Skreen Priory ^{~ø}		Benedictine monks granted to the monks of St Nicholas, Exeter — never a monastic cell	St Nicholas	52°20′15″N 6°27′50″W
Taghmon Monastery		Augustinian Canons Regular		52°19′16″N 6°39′10″W
Templeshanbo Monastery		early monastic site, founded 6th century by St Maedoc	Seanboth-Colmain; Senboth-Colmain; Senboth-sine	52°34′48″N 6°40′48″W
Tintern Abbey		Cistercian monks dependent on Tintern, Monmouthshire; founded 1200 by Wiliam Marshall, Earl of Pembroke; dissolved 1536; monks apparently permitted to remain until after 1539?; abbey seized 25 July 1539; church found to be parochial 22 January 1541; variously leased out; church converted for use as a castle or mansion	Tintern parva; de Voto	52°14′13″N 6°50′16″W
Wexford Friary		Franciscan Friars Minor, Conventual founded before 1268? (during the reign of Henry III), attributed to the Geraldine family; Observant Franciscan Friars reformed 1486; dissolved 1539-40; granted to Paul Turner and James Devereux 1544; occupied by Thomas Browne and Paul Turnor [Turner] 1548; destroyed by the Protestants 1560; abandoned until new house established 1615 (see immediately below)	Lough Garman	52°20′15″N 6°27′50″W
Wexford Greyfriars		Observant Franciscan Friars founded 1615		52°20′14″N 6°27′52″W
Wexford Nunnery		nuns founded after 1625		
Wexford Templars		Knights Templar granted church of St Alloch, mills and land by Henry II		

== Map link to lists of monastic houses in Ireland by county ==
Click on a county to go to the corresponding article.	Antrim; Armagh; Down; Fermanagh; Londonderry; Tyrone; Carlow; Cavan; Clare; Cork; Donegal; Dublin; Galway; Kerry; Kildare; Kilkenny; Laois; Leitrim; Limerick; Longford; Louth; Mayo; Meath; Monaghan; Offaly; Roscommon; Sligo; Tipperary; Waterford; Westmeath; Wexford; Wicklow

== See also ==
- List of monastic houses in Ireland
