= List of monastic houses in County Leitrim =

The smaller establishments such as monastic cells and notable monastic granges (particularly those with resident monks) and camerae of the military orders of monks (Knights Templars and Knights Hospitallers) are included. The numerous monastic hospitals per se are not included here unless at some time the foundation had, or was purported to have, the status or function of an abbey, priory, or preceptory/commandery.

== Layout ==
Communities/provenance: shows the status and communities existing at each establishment, together with such dates as have been established as well as the fate of the establishment after dissolution, and the current status of the site.

Formal name or dedication: shows the formal name of the establishment or the person in whose name the church is dedicated, where known.

Alternative names: some of the establishments have had alternative names over the course of time. In order to assist in text-searching such alternatives in name or spelling have been provided.

== Abbreviations and key ==
The sites listed are ruins or fragmentary remains unless indicated thus:
*	current monastic function
+	current non-monastic ecclesiastic function
^	current non-ecclesiastic function
=	remains incorporated into later structure
#	no identifiable trace of the monastic foundation remains
~	exact site of monastic foundation unknown
ø	possibly no such monastic foundation at location
¤	no such monastic foundation
≈	identification ambiguous or confused

Locations with names in italics indicate probable duplication (misidentification with another location) or non-existent foundations (either erroneous reference or proposed foundation never implemented).

Trusteeship denoted as follows:
NIEA	Scheduled Monument (NI)
NM	National Monument (ROI)
C.I.	Church of Ireland
R.C.	Roman Catholic Church

Foundation	Image	Communities & provenance	Formal name or dedication & alternative names	References & location
Annaduffe Abbey		early monastic site; founded 766, purportedly patronised by Comin Ea (possibly Cuimmin Fionn, Abbot of Iona); possibly ceased to exist 12th century; C.I. parochial church on site	Annaduff; Annagh-duffe; Annagh-yew; Eanach-Dubh	
Cloone Monastery		early monastic site, founded 6th century (probably before 570), by St Cruimthir Fraech (in the time of St Colmcille)	Cluain-chollaing; Cluain-Conmaicne; Clone	
Cuivelleagh Friary ^{≈}		Franciscan Friars, Third Order Regular founded by Lord of Chanligh, confirmed by the "Bishop of Athenry" (probably Achonry) and the pope; probable mistaken reference to Creevelea (Dromahair), q.v.		
Dromahair Friary		Observant Franciscan Friars founded 1508 by Margaret O'Brien (buried here), wife of Eoghan O'Rourke; burned 1536; rebuilt by Brian Ballach O'Rourke; dissolved c.1598; partly occupied by the English; occupied by a Harrison c.1617; another house built for friars 1618; reoccupied by friars 1642 and shortly after the Restoration to 1837	Creevelea; Craobhliath; Crowlekale; Crueleach; Carrag Patrice; Petra Patricii; Druim-da-ethair; Baile-ui-ruairc; Ballegruaircy; Cuivelleagh ?	54°13′52″N 8°18′35″W
Drumlease Monastery		early monastic site, founded 5th century by St Patrick	Druim-lias; Dromleas	54°15′23″N 8°17′47″W
Drumreilly Monastery		early monastic site; early bishopric; reference to hospital, 1479	Druim-airbelaid; Druim-erbelaid	
Fenagh Monastery		early monastic site; early bishopric; plundered and damaged 1244; possible community in existence up to 16th century	Fiodnacha-maighe-rein; Fidnacha	
Jamestown Friary		Franciscan Friars convent founded 1641 or later	Baile-thaidh-duib; Tullagh; Jacobopolis	
Killanummery Monastery		early monastic site; erenaghs in 14th century; with hospital 1595	Cell-an-iomaire; Killynonyre	54°12′29″N 8°17′28″W(?)
Killarga Monastery		early monastic site; erenaghs until at least 1416	Cell-ferta	54°13′48″N 8°12′27″W(?)
Killasnet Monastery		early monastic site, nuns founded by St Osnata	Cell-osnata	54°19′43″N 8°20′45″W(approx?)
Grange of Muintir Eolais (Note: Place names database of Ireland #29298)		"Abbey", (Note: Ordnance Survey) ruins of abbey, (Note: Gazetteer of Great Britain and Ireland, iv, p.2) ruins of church (Note: Lord Killanin & M. V. Duignan, Shell Guide to Ireland 1962, new edition 1967, p.346)		53°58′40″N 8°02′10″W
Port Monastery			Port;	53°58′52″N 8°03′58″W (approx)
Lough Nahoo Monastery		early monastic site, purportedly founded by 500	Lough-uama; Lough Uva	54°14′17″N 8°17′41″W (approx)
Monastery of Mohill-Manchan		early monastic site, founded 6th century by St Manchan; Attacked in 1590, parcel of monastery granted to Edward Barret 1592; Mohill granted to Terence (Tirlaughe) O'Byrne 1594	St Mary; Irish: Maethail, Maothail, Maethail-Manachain, Maothail-Manachain; Middle English: Maethla, Moithla, Moethla, Mucgail, Moghill, Mayhel; Latin: Mathail, Nouella	53°55′18″N 7°51′52″W
Rosinver		early monastic site, purportedly founded either by St Maedoc or St Tighernach; coarbs recorded to 1438	Ros-inbher	
Rossclogher Abbey, Kinlough		early monastic site, nuns founded before 810 by Tigernach (St Tigenach), Abbot of Killeigh, for his mother, St Mella; possible "Abbey" site	Doire Melle; Doiremelle; Dairemeilli	54°26′28″N 8°14′25″W

== Map link to lists of monastic houses in Ireland by county ==
Click on a county to go to the corresponding article.	Antrim; Armagh; Down; Fermanagh; Londonderry; Tyrone; Carlow; Cavan; Clare; Cork; Donegal; Dublin; Galway; Kerry; Kildare; Kilkenny; Laois; Leitrim; Limerick; Longford; Louth; Mayo; Meath; Monaghan; Offaly; Roscommon; Sligo; Tipperary; Waterford; Westmeath; Wexford; Wicklow

== References and notes ==
=== Secondary references ===
- Morrin, James (1862). Calendar of the Patent and Close Rolls of Chancery in Ireland, of the Reigns of Henry VIII., Edward VI., Mary, and Elizabeth ...: 1576-1602. Vol. II of Calendar of the Patent and Close Rolls of Chancery in Ireland, of the Reigns of Henry VIII. (Ireland. Chancery. ed.). A. Thom & sons.
- Lewis, Samuel (1837). A Topographical Dictionary of Ireland, Volume 1 (Original from Lyon Public Library, digitized 19 Aug 2011 ed.). Lewis.

== See also ==
- List of monastic houses in Ireland
