= List of monastic houses in County Fermanagh =

The following is a list of the monastic houses in County Fermanagh, Northern Ireland. The smaller establishments such as monastic cells and notable monastic granges (particularly those with resident monks) and camerae of the military orders of monks (Knights Templars and Knights Hospitallers) are included. The numerous monastic hospitals per se are not included here unless at some time the foundation had, or was purported to have, the status or function of an abbey, priory, or preceptory/commandery.

== Layout ==
Communities/provenance: shows the status and communities existing at each establishment, together with such dates as have been established as well as the fate of the establishment after dissolution, and the current status of the site.

Formal name or dedication: shows the formal name of the establishment or the person in whose name the church is dedicated, where known.

Alternative names: some of the establishments have had alternative names over the course of time. In order to assist in text-searching such alternatives in name or spelling have been provided.

== Abbreviations and key ==
The sites listed are ruins or fragmentary remains unless indicated thus:
*	current monastic function
+	current non-monastic ecclesiastic function
^	current non-ecclesiastic function
=	remains incorporated into later structure
#	no identifiable trace of the monastic foundation remains
~	exact site of monastic foundation unknown
ø	possibly no such monastic foundation at location
¤	no such monastic foundation
≈	identification ambiguous or confused

Locations with names in italics indicate probable duplication (misidentification with another location) or non-existent foundations (either erroneous reference or proposed foundation never implemented).

Trusteeship denoted as follows:
NIEA	Scheduled Monument (NI)
NM	National Monument (ROI)
C.I.	Church of Ireland
R.C.	Roman Catholic Church

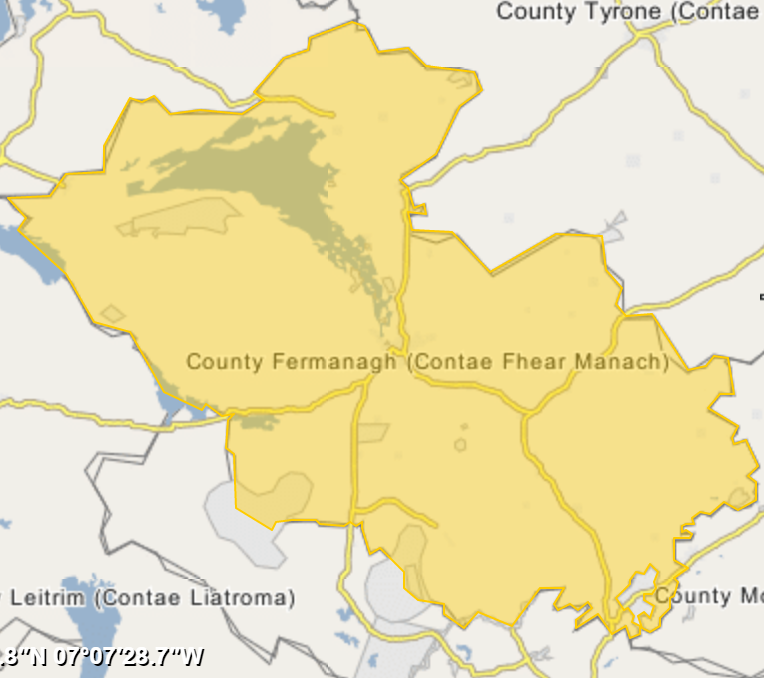
Locations of monastic houses in County Fermanagh

Foundation	Image	Communities & provenance	Formal name or dedication & alternative names	References & location
Aghalurcher Monastery		early monastic site, founded 8th century by St Ronan, son of Aedh Dubh	Achad-urchaire; Achad-lurchaire	54°14′04″N 7°27′06″W
Aghavea Monastery		early monastic site, founded 6th century (about the time of St Molaise of Devenish) by Lasair of Achad-beithe	Achad-beithe	54°17′34″N 7°25′30″W (approx)
Aredmuilt Monastery		early monastic site, probably Derryvullan	Ariodmuilt	
Boho Monastery		early monastic site	Botha; St Faber; Feadhbar	54°20′59″N 7°47′45″W (approx)
Davy's Island Monastery		Augustinian Canons Regular cell of Lisgoole; ruined wall purported to be remains of the cell	Inishmore	54°28′55″N 7°46′45″W (approx)
Derrybrusk Monastery			Daire-broscaidh; Aireach-brosca; Daerybrosca; Seanadh; Belle Isle	
Devenish Island Abbey, Lough Erne		Augustinian Canons Regular — probably from SS Peter & Paul, Armagh founded 1130, adjacent to Culdees house (see immediately below); Augustinian Canons Regular — Arroasian dependent on Armagh after 1140; burned 1157 and 1360; apparently dependent on Clogher 1427; dissolved after 1600; deserted 1607; possibly Augustinian Friars (if Dominensis)	The Abbey Church of Saint Mary, Devenish Island St Laserian's parish and collegiate church (1457) ____________________; Devenish Island Priory; Daiminis; Daminis; Inis-na-nDam; Dominensis?	54°22′12″N 7°39′17″W
Devenish Monastery		early monastic site, founded before 564 or 571 by St Molaise (Laisre); Culdees from 10th century		
Gola Priory		Dominican Friars founded after 1660 by Fr John MacManus, obtaining land from Lord Enniskillen	The Priory of the Nativity of the Blessed Virgin Mary ____________________; Gaula	54°17′31″N 7°32′32″W
Iniseo Monastery		early monastic site, founded before 777 by St Constans	Ins-eo; Inisionois in Lough Erne; Eonois	
Inishmacsaint Monastery, Lough Erne		founded 6th century by Saint Ninnidh Láimhdhearg	Inis-maige-samh, Island of the Sorrel Plain	54°26′08″N 7°44′43″W
Inisrocha Monastery, Lough Erne		early monastic site, listed as an abbey		
Kilcoo Monastery		early monastic site, founded by St Patrick?; remains of high cross	St Patrick?	54°22′34″N 8°03′27″W (approx)
Kiltierney Monastery		early monastic site?; Cistercian monks grange	Cell-tighernaigh; Kilternan	54°30′43″N 7°39′29″W
Kinawley Monastery		early monastic site, founded before 563	Cell-naale; Kilnaile	54°13′35″N 7°39′07″W (approx)
Lisgoole Abbey ^{#}		founded 1106? built on site of early monastery (see immediately below); Augustinian Canons Regular founded c.1145 by Mc'Noellus Mackenlef, King of Ulaid; Augustinian Canons Regular — Arroasian? possibly adopted between 1140 and 1148 at the behest of St Malachy; became ruinous, dissolved 1583 (c.1580); Observant Franciscan Friars reformed 1580-3; dissolved 1598, friars expelled; refounded at another location 1616 to before 1811	The Abbey Church of Saint Peter, Saint Paul and Saint Mary, Lisgoole	54°19′29″N 7°37′49″W (approx)
Lisgoole Monastery ^{#}		early monastic site; site later occupied by Augustinian priory (see immediately above)	The monastery of Saint Aid, Lisgoole; ____________________; Lissgabail; Leasa-gobail; Lisgobhail; Lis-gamhail; Lis-gevail; Lis-govel	54°19′29″N 7°37′49″W (approx)
Magheracross Monastery		apparent early monastic site, Culdee	Machaire-na-croise	54°12′43″N 7°29′49″W (approx)
Pubble Monastery		early monastic site	Popull; Pobul; Chappell of Popull; Collidea	54°21′57″N 7°29′23″W
Rossory Monastery		early monastic site, nuns founded before 480 by St Fanchea; church of St Fuinche founded 1084; hospital or hospice founded c.1371?	Ros-airthir; Ros-oirthir	54°20′06″N 7°38′45″W
Tivealough Monastery ^{ø} Keenaghan		possibly an early Christian monastic site, fd. before the 12th century; purportedly Franciscan Friars evidence lacking; medieval ruins described as 'abbey or church'	Tievaelough; Tivea Lough; Magheramanagh; Keenaghan Abbey	54°29′18″N 8°02′05″W (approx)
White Island Monastery?		attempts made to identify this location as being Eo-inis monastery		

== Map link to lists of monastic houses in Ireland by county ==
Click on a county to go to the corresponding article.	Antrim; Armagh; Down; Fermanagh; Londonderry; Tyrone; Carlow; Cavan; Clare; Cork; Donegal; Dublin; Galway; Kerry; Kildare; Kilkenny; Laois; Leitrim; Limerick; Longford; Louth; Mayo; Meath; Monaghan; Offaly; Roscommon; Sligo; Tipperary; Waterford; Westmeath; Wexford; Wicklow

== See also ==
- List of monastic houses in Ireland
