= List of monastic houses in County Londonderry =

The following is a list of the monastic houses in County Londonderry, Northern Ireland.

The smaller establishments such as monastic cells and notable monastic granges (particularly those with resident monks) and camerae of the military orders of monks (Knights Templars and Knights Hospitallers) are included. The numerous monastic hospitals per se are not included here unless at some time the foundation had, or was purported to have, the status or function of an abbey, priory, or preceptory/commandery.

== Layout ==
Communities/provenance: shows the status and communities existing at each establishment, together with such dates as have been established as well as the fate of the establishment after dissolution, and the current status of the site.

Formal name or dedication: shows the formal name of the establishment or the person in whose name the church is dedicated, where known.

Alternative names: some of the establishments have had alternative names over the course of time. In order to assist in text-searching such alternatives in name or spelling have been provided.

== Abbreviations and key ==
The sites listed are ruins or fragmentary remains unless indicated thus:
*	current monastic function
+	current non-monastic ecclesiastic function
^	current non-ecclesiastic function
=	remains incorporated into later structure
#	no identifiable trace of the monastic foundation remains
~	exact site of monastic foundation unknown
ø	possibly no such monastic foundation at location
¤	no such monastic foundation
≈	identification ambiguous or confused

Locations with names in italics indicate probable duplication (misidentification with another location) or non-existent foundations (either erroneous reference or proposed foundation never implemented).

Trusteeship denoted as follows:
NIEA	Scheduled Monument (NI)
NM	National Monument (ROI)
C.I.	Church of Ireland
R.C.	Roman Catholic Church

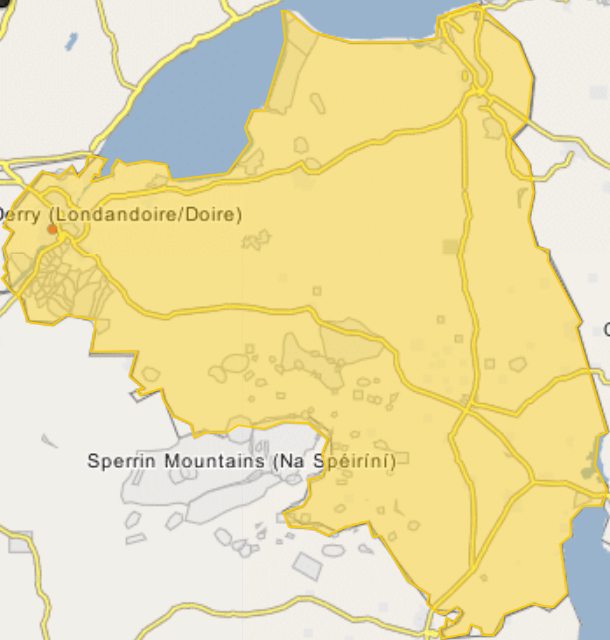
Locations of monastic houses in County Londonderry
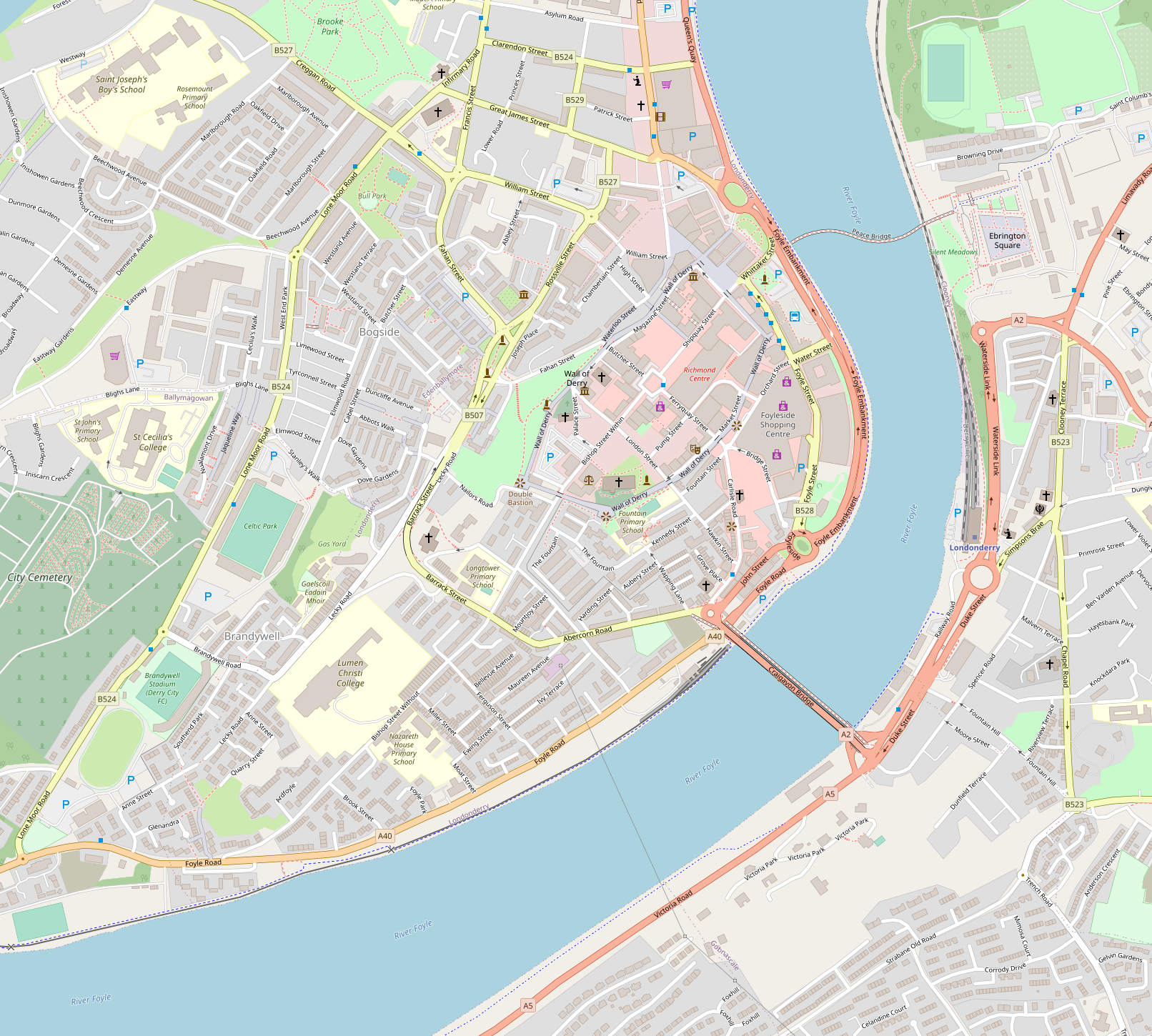
Locations of monastic houses in County Londonderry
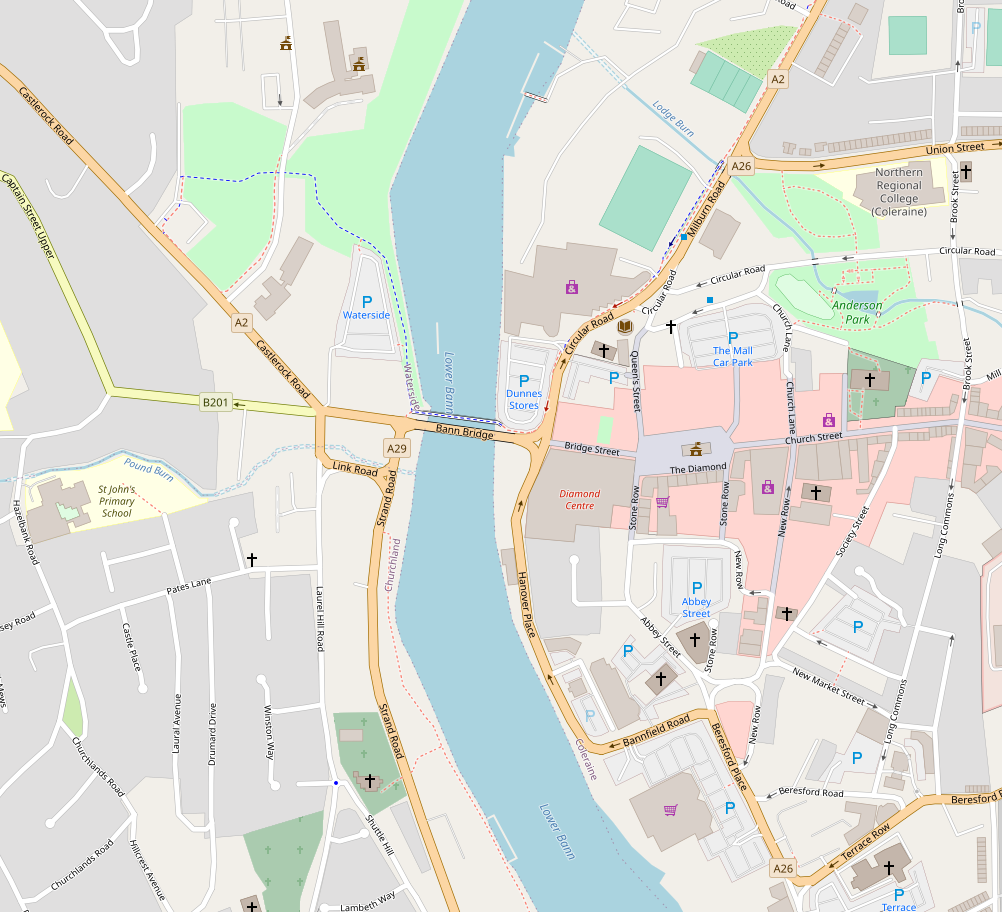
Locations of monastic houses in Coleraine

Foundation	Image	Communities & provenance	Formal name or dedication & alternative names	References & location
Aghadowey Monastery ^{#}		early monastic site; hospital of St Gowry 1603	Achad-dubthaigh; Achedoffey	55°01′45″N 6°39′27″W
Aghanloo Monastery		early monastic site; under erenaghs until 16th century	Ath-luga; Ath-longe; Allowa	55°05′37″N 6°56′14″W
Agivey Monastery		early monastic site; purportedly founded 7th century by St Guar of Aghadowey; Cistercian monks grange of Macosquin	Augheve; Athgeybi	55°02′22″N 6°35′16″W
Ballymagrorty Monastery (Derry Diocese)		early monastic site, founded 6th century by St Colmcille	Baile-meg-robhartaig; Baile-megrabhartaigh	55°05′41″N 6°39′49″W
Ballynascreen Monastery		early monastic site, founded 6th century by St Colmcille	Scrin-coluim-cille	54°45′33″N 6°52′00″W
Banagher Monastery	Banagher Old Church - geograph.org.uk - 595232	early monastic site, traditionally founded 11th century? by St Muriedbach O'Heney; under erenaghs until early 17th century	Bennchor; Bangoria	54°53′19″N 6°58′23″W
Bovevagh Monastery	Site of Bovevagh old church - geograph.org.uk - 716443	early monastic site, purportedly founded 575 by St Colmcille; oratory burned 1100; under erenaghs until 17th century	Both-mheidhbhe; Both-medhbha	54°57′33″N 6°56′44″W
Camus Monastery		early monastic site, founded before c.580; under erenaghs until 16th/17th century	Camas; Cambos; Camsa	55°06′02″N 6°38′06″W
Church Island Monastery, Lough Beg		early monastic site; plundered by Ulidians 1129; under erenaghs until early 17th century	St Mochonna (possibly St Mochonna of Killyman) ____________________; Inistaiti; InisTeda; Ballyscullion; Inish Taoide	54°47′24″N 6°29′05″W
Coleraine Monastery; St Patrick's		early monastic site, founded 5th century by St Patrick; burned 731; suffered destruction 1171 and 1177;	Cuil Raithin; Cul-rathain; Colran; Bannin;	55°07′55″N 6°40′07″W
Coleraine Monastery; St Carbreus		early monastic site, founded 6th century by St Carbreus; dismantled in 1213, Drumtarsey castle erected on site	Cuil Raithin; Abbey of the Bann	55°08′04″N 6°40′43″W (approx)
Coleraine Friary		Dominican Friars founded 1244; Dominican Friars, Regular Observant reformed 1484; dissolved 1543	St Mary	55°07′49″N 6°40′21″W (approx)
Coleraine; Killowen		founded 1248	Drumtarsy; Cill Eoghain - Owen's church; Cill-Eogain - St John's Church	55°07′42″N 6°40′35″W (approx)
Cumber Monastery		early monastic site, traditionally founded 5th century by St Patrick; under secular erenaghs until early 17th century	Combior; Camer; Commyr	54°54′20″N 7°09′42″W
Derry Monastery ^{~}		early monastic site, traditionally founded c.546 by St Colmcille, but probably c.590 by Fiachra mac Ciárain mac Ainmerech mac Sétna; St Augustine's C.I. Church or St Columb's Church are cited as alternative possible locations of the monastery	Daire-calgach; Doire-Choluim-Chille; Daire Duib-recles; Cella Nigra	54°59′41″N 7°19′26″W possible or 54°59′34″N 7°19′43″W possible
Derry Abbey		Augustinian Canons Regular — Arroasian — affiliated to SS Peter & Paul, Armagh; founded c.1233?; reportedly in very poor state of repair by 1411, due to warfare and adversity; churches desecrated and community expelled 1566; under occupation by English troops under Colonel Edward Randolph; restored? canons possibly briefly returned; dissolved 1576?; reoccupied by the English; Augustinian Friars refounded c.1643	Cella Nigra	
Derry Priory		Cistercian nuns founded 1218; dissolved 1512		
Derry Franciscan Priory	purported foundation of Franciscan Friars; (in 1609 the commissioners erroneously took the ruins of the Blackfriars house (see immediately below) to be Franciscan)			
Derry — St Dominic's Priory		spurious accounts of earlier Dominican foundation; Dominican Friars founded 1274; dissolved 1576; briefly restored?	St Dominic	
Desertmartin Monastery		early monastic site, apparently founded by a member of the O'Lynn family (suggested by the name Mainister O'Fhloinn); erenaghs until 16th century	Mainister O'Fhloinn; Moneysterlin	54°46′12″N 6°40′15″W
Desertoghill Monastery		early monastic site, purportedly founded by St Colmcille; erenaghs until 16th century	Disert-ui-tuathghaill; Desert-O'Tuohill	54°58′23″N 6°40′18″W
Donnybrewer Monastery		early monastic site	Domnach-dala; Domnach-dola	55°02′46″N 7°13′44″W (approx)
Drumachose Abbey		early monastic site, patronised 6th century by St Cainnech	Druimcoos; Dirumcoos; Dronagh; Drungrosa; Roa	55°03′03″N 6°54′59″W
Dunboe Monastery		early monastic site, founded by St Adamnan; erenaghs until 16th century	Dun-bo; ~co Dun-mbó i n-Dal riatai; Duna-uó, a tempull; Durrbo, par. ecclesie de	55°09′36″N 6°48′40″W
Duncrun Monastery		early monastic site, founded by St Patrick	Dun-cruithne	55°08′48″N 6°56′01″W (approx)
Dungiven Monastery		early monastic site, founded 7th century, by St Naechtain?	Dun-geimin; Dun-giobhin; Dun-gevin	54°55′02″N 6°55′18″W
Dungiven Priory		Augustinian Canons Regular — Arroasian? founded after 1140? (after 1138?), purportedly by the O'Cahan family; dissolved before 1603; round tower incorporated into church, but collapsed c.1784	St Mary	54°55′02″N 6°55′18″W
Errigal Monastery		early monastic site, purportedly founded 6th century by St Colmcille; destroyed by Norsemen 9th century; erenaghs until 16th/17th century	Airecal-Adamnan; Arragel; Temple Erigall; Airecuil, Cainnech	54°58′32″N 6°44′03″W (approx)
Faughanvale Monastery		early monastic site, erenaghs until 16th century	St Canice (St Conici) ____________________; Nuachongbail; Fochwayll; Killeitra; Tircaerthian	55°01′57″N 7°05′42″W
Kilcronaghan Monastery	Old Kilcronaghan Church, Mormeal - geograph.org.uk - 355618	early monastic site, patronised by St Cruithnechan; erenaghs until early 17th century	Cell-cruithneachain	54°47′40″N 6°44′00″W
Killelagh Monastery	erroneously given as County Derry in Gwynn & Hadcock index — actually County Donegal			
Kilrea Monastery		early monastic site; erenagh land until 1609	Cell-reagh	54°56′00″N 6°34′42″W
Lan More Friary ^{~}		Franciscan Friars, Third Order Regular foundation unknown; dissolution unknown; possibly County Londonderry or County Antrim	Landmore?	55°02′05″N 6°36′34″W
Lissan Monastery		early monastic site, founded before 744	Lessan; ~Lessain episcopi; ~Lesan i Sliabh Callann,ó; ~o Lesan i Sliabh Callan	54°41′07″N 6°46′05″W (approx)
Macosquin Abbey ^{+}		Cistercian monks — from Morimond, France founded 1218; dissolved before 1600; granted to the London Companies (Merchant Taylors) authorities for the plantation of Derry; house named 'Glebe House' built on site of claustral buildings c.1770; scant remains of monastic church incorporated into St Mary's C.I. parish church, built on site	Clarus Fons; Magoscain; Moycoscain	55°05′59″N 6°42′26″W
Maghera Monastery ^{+}		early monastic site, founded 6th century by St Lurach; plundeded by the Norsemen 832; church burnt 1135; diocesan cathedral see transferred from Ardstraw c.1152; see transferred to Derry 1254	Machaire-ratha-luraig; Rath-Luraig; Rath-lure	54°50′32″N 6°40′24″W
Magilligan Monastery		early monastic site, erenagh land until early 17th century	Aird-megiollagain; Ardia; Scrin-i-nArdia; Ballynascreen-ardia; Tamlachta-ard; Tamlaght-ard; The Shrine of St Columb	55°07′44″N 6°56′33″W (approx)
Tamlaght Finlagan Monastery		early monastic site, founded 585 by St Fionn-logha; erenaghs until early 17th century; site occupied by remains of a church destroyed 1641	Tamlacht-fionloga; Templefinlagan; Ballykelly	55°02′26″N 6°58′50″W
Tamlaght O'Crilly Monastery		early monastic site; erenaghs until early 17th century	Ta, lachta-mac-ninaich	54°53′37″N 6°34′59″W
Termoneeny Monastery		early monastic site; erenaghs until early 17th century	~in Enga; Termon-any; Eanegea	54°50′00″N 6°40′02″W

== Map link to lists of monastic houses in Ireland by county ==
Click on a county to go to the corresponding article.	Antrim; Armagh; Down; Fermanagh; Londonderry; Tyrone; Carlow; Cavan; Clare; Cork; Donegal; Dublin; Galway; Kerry; Kildare; Kilkenny; Laois; Leitrim; Limerick; Longford; Louth; Mayo; Meath; Monaghan; Offaly; Roscommon; Sligo; Tipperary; Waterford; Westmeath; Wexford; Wicklow

== See also ==
- List of monastic houses in Ireland
