= List of monastic houses in County Longford =

The smaller establishments such as monastic cells and notable monastic granges (particularly those with resident monks) and camerae of the military orders of monks (Knights Templars and Knights Hospitallers) are included. The numerous monastic hospitals per se are not included here unless at some time the foundation had, or was purported to have, the status or function of an abbey, priory, or preceptory/commandery.

== Layout ==
Communities/provenance: shows the status and communities existing at each establishment, together with such dates as have been established as well as the fate of the establishment after dissolution, and the current status of the site.

Formal name or dedication: shows the formal name of the establishment or the person in whose name the church is dedicated, where known.

Alternative names: some of the establishments have had alternative names over the course of time. In order to assist in text-searching such alternatives in name or spelling have been provided.

== Abbreviations and key ==
The sites listed are ruins or fragmentary remains unless indicated thus:
*	current monastic function
+	current non-monastic ecclesiastic function
^	current non-ecclesiastic function
=	remains incorporated into later structure
#	no identifiable trace of the monastic foundation remains
~	exact site of monastic foundation unknown
ø	possibly no such monastic foundation at location
¤	no such monastic foundation
≈	identification ambiguous or confused

Locations with names in italics indicate probable duplication (misidentification with another location) or non-existent foundations (either erroneous reference or proposed foundation never implemented).

Trusteeship denoted as follows:
NIEA	Scheduled Monument (NI)
NM	National Monument (ROI)
C.I.	Church of Ireland
R.C.	Roman Catholic Church

Foundation	Image	Communities & provenance	Formal name or dedication & alternative names	References & location
Abbeyderg Abbey		Augustinian Canons Regular founded before 1216 (during the reign of King John) probably by Gormgall O'Quinn; raised to abbey status after 1487? dissolved 1540; restored?, occupied by John O'Ferral, previously abbot, 1548, by assignment of Sir Thomas Cusak; granted to Nicholas Ailmer, termor	St Peter ____________________; Monaster-darig; Monaster-deirg; Monaster-derick	53°38′17″N 7°47′15″W
Abbeylara Abbey		Cistercian monks — from St Mary's, Dublin founded c.1210 by Sir Richard Tuit; colonised 1214; dissolved 1540	Leathragh; Laragh; Leathan; Monaster-Lethratha; Granard	53°45′52″N 7°26′46″W
Abbeyshrule Abbey		Cistercian monks — from Mellifont founded 1200 by the O'Ferral family; affiliation changed to Bective 1228; dissolved 1569; suppressed by Queen Elizabeth, 1592; (NM)	Flumen Dei; Sruthair; Schrowl	53°34′47″N 7°39′29″W
Ardagh Monastery		early monastic site founded 5th century by St Patrick or St Mel? diocesan cathedral 1111	Ardachad	53°40′02″N 7°41′33″W
Ballynasaggart Friary		Franciscan Friars, Third Order Regular founded after 1510? by Geoffrey O'Ferrall; dissolved 1540; Observant Franciscan Friars refounded 1634; dissolved 1811	St John the Baptist Friary (from 1634) ____________________; Ballinasaggart; Baile-na-sagart; Baile-ne-saggard	53°41′29″N 7°37′21″W
Cashel Monastery		Augustinian Canons Regular ruins near parish church purportedly remains of a foundation dependent on Inchcleraun (Note: S. Lewis, Topographical Dictionary of Ireland, 1837, i, p.283)		53°35′30″N 7°58′44″W?
Clonbroney Abbey		early monastic site, nuns purportedly founded 5th century by St Patrick; dissolved after 1163	Cluain-bronaig; Cluain-ebrone	53°45′04″N 7°36′52″W
Cloondara Monastery		early monastic site, probable patron St Ernan of Cloneogher, 6th century	Cluain-da-ratha; Cluain-daragh	53°43′57″N 7°54′26″W
Cloneogher Monastery		early monastic site, patron St Ernan, 6th century (in the time of St Colmcille)	Cluain-deochra; Clonogherie; Clonoghrir	53°43′13″N 7°56′19″W (approx)
Druim-cheo Nunnery ^{ø~}		purported early monastic site, nuns — evidence lacking	Druim-chea; Bawn?	53°40′31″N 7°48′14″W (approx?)
Forgney Monastery		early monastic site, founded 5th century by St Patrick	Forgnaide	53°32′43″N 7°40′59″W (approx)
Granard Monastery		early monastic site, founded 5th century by St Patrick, granted by Coirpre's sons	Granairud; Granard Kill	53°46′42″N 7°29′34″W (approx.)
Inchbofin Monastery	Former county location. See List of monastic houses in County Westmeath			
Inchcleraun Priory		early monastic site, founded 6th century (c.540 or probably earlier) by St Diarmuid (Dermod); Augustinian Canons Regular (— Arroasian)? refounded after 1140; plundered several times; plundered 1098 by O'Brien dissolved c.1541	Inis-clothrann; Inis-cloghran; Quaker Island	53°34′57″N 8°00′23″W
Inchmore Priory, Lough Gowna		early monastic site, founded 6th century by St Colmcille; Augustinian Canons Regular (— Arroasian)? dependent on Louth refounded after 1140; dissolved 1540, surrendered 8 October 1540; occupied by Lyosagh O'Ferral by 1548, by assignment with Sir Thomas Cusacke; leased to James Nugent 1560	St Mary (from Augustinian refoundation, after 1140) ____________________; Inismor-Loch-Gamna; Inchymory; Columbkille, Lough Gawna/Lough Gowna; Teampull Choluim Cille (early church)	53°49′23″N 7°34′04″W
Inchmore Priory, Lough Ree	Former county location. See List of monastic houses in County Westmeath			
Kilcommoc Friary		Dominican Friars — probable place of refuge after expulsion from Longford	Kil-comin; Kil-cumin	53°36′07″N 7°48′48″W (possible)
Kilglass Monastery		possible early monastic site, nuns possibly founded 5th century by St Eiche, sister of St Mel and niece of St Patrick	Cell-glaissi	53°37′56″N 7°39′11″W
Kilmodain Monastery		early monastic site	Abbey of St Modan; Cell-muadain, in Kilmahon?	53°48′59″N 7°45′06″W (approx)
Longford Friary ^{+?}		Dominican Friars founded 1400 by ——— O'Farrel; Regular Observant Dominican Friars reformed before 1429; dissolved 1540-1, nominally suppressed; friars probably remained in occupation granted to Richard Nugent 1566-7; dissolved 1578?; granted to Sir Nicholas Malby 1578; granted to Francis, Vicount Valentia 1615; restored to the friars 1641 during the Confederation; friars' church in use by the Protestants until mid-19th century; St John's C.I. parish church built on site, possibly incorporating some of the material from the friars' church	St Brigid ____________________ Latoria; Longphort	53°43′53″N 7°47′59″W
Longford Monastery ^{ø}	mistakenly-purported early monastic site (Note: Mervyn Archdall, Monasticon Hibernicum, 1786, p.444 gives St Idus having a foundation here, which was actually at Aghade (Ath-fadat—"long ford"), County Carlow)			
Raithin Monastery ^{~}		early monastic site, founded 5th century by St Patrick	Raithen; possibly Leath Rath, (Note: J. J. McNamee, DD, History of the Diocese of Ardagh, 1954, pp.34-5, 541) near Longford	
Saints Island Priory, Lough Ree		dubious early monastic site founded before 542 by Ciaran; (Note: James Ware, De Hibernia et Antiquitatibus ejus, 1654 edition, p.172 and others, confuse Saints Island and Inis Aingin, the latter being founded by St Ciaran. Louis Augustin Alemand, Monasticum Hibernicum, translated and edited by John Stevens, 1722, pp.49, 50, has a foundation by Ciaran at both locations, which is possible, though Inis Aingin alone is mentioned in the Life of St Ciaran: Vitae Sanctorum Hiberniae, edited by Charles Plummer, 1910, i, pp.210, 211); Augustinian Canons Regular founded before 1200 by a descendant of Sir Henry Dillon of Drumrany; dissolved after 1600?; Augustinian Friars founded 1643	All Saints; Inis-na-naomh; Oilean-na-naomh; Insula Omnium Sanctorum; Insula Sacra; Holy Island	53°33′17″N 7°53′37″W

== Map link to lists of monastic houses in Ireland by county ==
Click on a county to go to the corresponding article.	Antrim; Armagh; Down; Fermanagh; Londonderry; Tyrone; Carlow; Cavan; Clare; Cork; Donegal; Dublin; Galway; Kerry; Kildare; Kilkenny; Laois; Leitrim; Limerick; Longford; Louth; Mayo; Meath; Monaghan; Offaly; Roscommon; Sligo; Tipperary; Waterford; Westmeath; Wexford; Wicklow

== See also ==
- List of monastic houses in Ireland
