= NetRegs =

UK environmental guidance service for businesses

NetRegs is a website set up to help small businesses in Scotland and Northern Ireland to become more environmentally aware. It has been developed by a partnership between the Scottish Environment Protection Agency and the Northern Ireland Environment Agency.

NetRegs is a source of free environmental guidance for small and medium-sized enterprises based in Scotland and Northern Ireland and provides information and guidance on key environmental legislation as well as environmental practices for every type of business.

Since 2006, it has also offered to provide updates by email. NetRegs also provides free e-learning tools, an environmental self assessment tool and hosts the Guidance for Pollution Prevention documents (GPPs), a replacement for the old PPGs).
