= Northern Ireland Environment Agency =

Northern Irish executive agency

The Northern Ireland Environment Agency (NIEA) is an executive agency within the Department of Agriculture, Environment and Rural Affairs (DAERA). It is responsible for conservation of Northern Ireland's environment and natural heritage.

Originally part of the Department of the Environment (DOENI), the agency was called the Environment and Heritage Service (EHS) until 1 July 2008, and also had responsibility for the historic environment. On 16 May 2016 the DOENI was dissolved and NIEA became part of DAERA. At the same time, the historic environment functions of NIEA were transferred to the Department for Communities.

NIEA is responsible for a range of protected areas in Northern Ireland, including eight areas of outstanding natural beauty, 47 national nature reserves, 43 special areas of conservation, and 10 special protection areas. The NIEA employs 630 people as of 2020.

== Equivalent bodies in other parts of the United Kingdom ==
- England: Environment Agency, Natural England
- Scotland: NatureScot, Scottish Environment Protection Agency
- Wales: Natural Resources Wales

== See also ==
- List of Northern Ireland ministers, government departments and executive agencies
- Conservation in the United Kingdom
- NetRegs
