= List of monastic houses in County Tyrone =

The smaller establishments such as monastic cells and notable monastic granges (particularly those with resident monks) and camerae of the military orders of monks (Knights Templars and Knights Hospitallers) are included. The numerous monastic hospitals per se are not included here unless at some time the foundation had, or was purported to have, the status or function of an abbey, priory, or preceptory/commandery.

== Layout ==
Communities/provenance: shows the status and communities existing at each establishment, together with such dates as have been established as well as the fate of the establishment after dissolution, and the current status of the site.

Formal name or dedication: shows the formal name of the establishment or the person in whose name the church is dedicated, where known.

Alternative names: some of the establishments have had alternative names over the course of time. In order to assist in text-searching such alternatives in name or spelling have been provided.

== Abbreviations and key ==
The sites listed are ruins or fragmentary remains unless indicated thus:
*	current monastic function
+	current non-monastic ecclesiastic function
^	current non-ecclesiastic function
=	remains incorporated into later structure
#	no identifiable trace of the monastic foundation remains
~	exact site of monastic foundation unknown
ø	possibly no such monastic foundation at location
¤	no such monastic foundation
≈	identification ambiguous or confused

Locations with names in italics indicate probable duplication (misidentification with another location) or non-existent foundations (either erroneous reference or proposed foundation never implemented).

Trusteeship denoted as follows:
NIEA	Scheduled Monument (NI)
NM	National Monument (ROI)
C.I.	Church of Ireland
R.C.	Roman Catholic Church

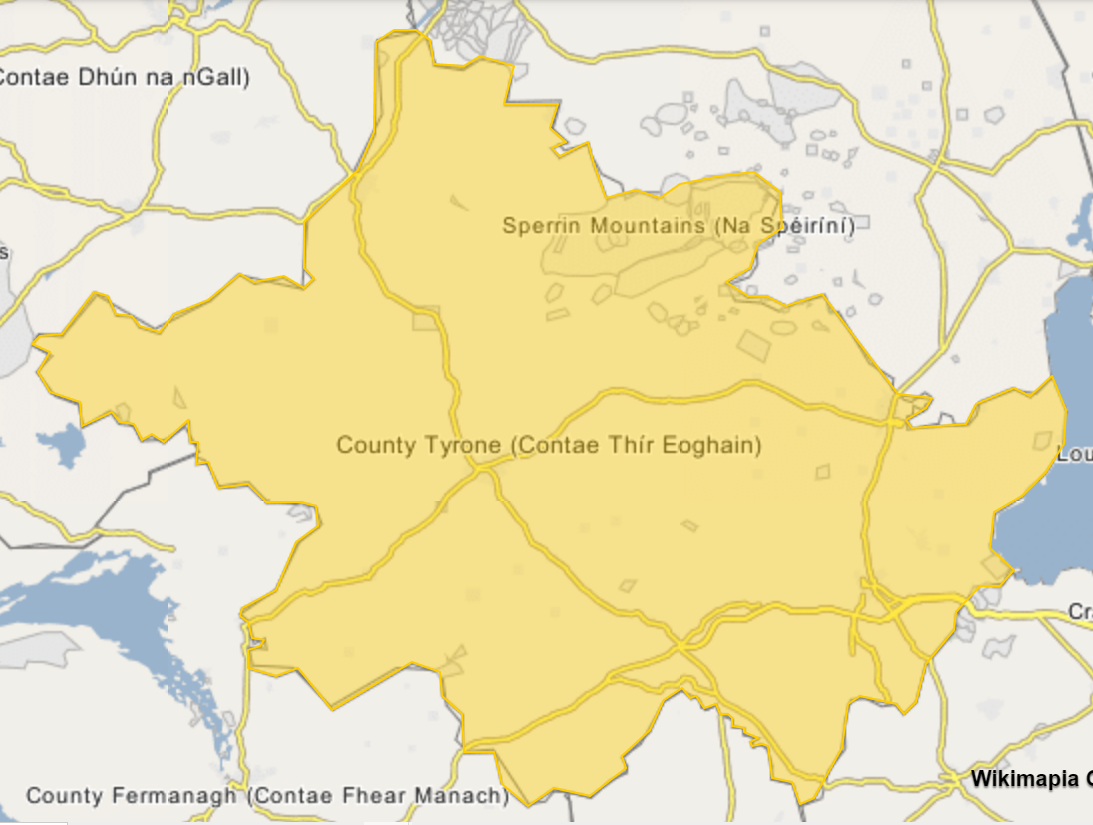
Locations of monastic houses in County Tyrone

Foundation	Image	Communities & provenance	Formal name or dedication & alternative names	References & location
Ardboe Monastery	Ardboe Abbey - geograph.org.uk - 190469	early monastic site, founded late 6th century; burned 1166; destroyed by John de Courcey in 1198	Ard-bo; Arboe	54°37′10″N 6°30′18″W
Ardstraw Monastery		early monastic site, founded by St Eugene; diocesan cathedral c.581; see transferred to Maghera c.1152; erenaghs until early 17th century	Ard-stratha; Ard-strath; Cenel-Eoghain; Kinel-eoguin	54°44′04″N 7°27′31″W
Ardtrea Monastery		early monastic site, nuns founded 5th century by St Trea	Artrea; Ard-trega	54°37′38″N 6°40′33″W
Ballinesaggart Friary		Franciscan Friars, Third Order Regular?		
Ballynasaggart Friary		Franciscan Friars, Third Order Regular founded c.1489 by Con O'Neal; dissolved before 1607?	Baile-na-sagart; Baile-i-dhalaigh; Balenesegert	54°27′28″N 7°04′32″W
Priory of Our Lady of Benburb *		Servite Friars founded 1949 at a mansion in the demesne of Benburb Castle		54°24′30″N 6°44′31″W
Bodoney Monastery ^{#}		early monastic site, founded 5th century by St Patrick; St Patrick's C.I. parish church possibly built on site	Badoney; Both-domnaich	54°45′46″N 7°09′49″W
Brantry		Franciscan Friars Minor, Conventual — place of refuge from Armagh		54°27′36″N 6°51′44″W
Cappagh Monastery	Dunmullan Old Graveyard. Cappagh. County Tyrone	early monastic site, patron St Eoghan; erenaghs until 16th century	Ceapach; Kappagh; Cappaghquoart	54°40′05″N 7°18′17″W
Carrickmore Monastery		early monastic site, founded by St Columba	Temple termonmaguirk?; Termon Cumainig	54°35′57″N 7°02′59″W
Clogher Abbey — St Mary		Augustinian Canons Regular — Arroasian transferred from cathedral (see immediately below) before 1183; dissolved before 1600?	St Mary	
Clogher Abbey — St Macarten's Cathedral		early monastic site, founded 5th century by St Patrick; episcopal diocesan cathedral 1111; Augustinian Canons Regular founded after 1135; Augustinian Canons Regular — Arroasian adopted after 1140; see transferred to Louth c.1138; transferred to new site (see immediately above) before 1183; see returned 1192; CI episcopal diocesan cathedral from 8 August 1542	St Macarten ____________________; Clochar	54°24′39″N 7°10′19″W
Clonfeacle Monastery		early monastic site, founded before 597; Culdees united to Armagh c.950; site possibly occupied by St Jarlath's RC Church	Cluain-fiachne; Cluain-fiacul	54°24′38″N 6°42′32″W
Corickmore Abbey		Franciscan Friars, Third Order Regular founded before 1500; dissolved c.1603; granted to Sir Henry Piers; assignee Sir Daniel Lee	Caorock; Comrac; Corrock	54°44′22″N 7°17′56″W
Donaghanie Monastery		early monastic site, founded by St Patrick	Domnach an Eich; Donnagh an egh	54°33′39″N 7°13′18″W
Donaghedy Monastery	Donaghedy Church, Donemana - geograph.org.uk - 206601	early monastic site, patron St Caidinus (Bishop Caoiti); erenaghs until early 17th century	Domnach-caoide	54°53′10″N 7°17′35″W
Donaghenry Monastery		early monastic site, founded by St Patrick	inDomnuch Camri; Dompnaghfynner; Domhnach Fainre; Donaghendry	54°35′23″N 6°42′24″W
Donaghmore Monastery		early monastic site, founded 5th century by St Patrick; dissolved after 1172; burned 1195; shrines owned by Culdees 1291; in use as parochial church 1306; rectory owned by Culdees until 16th century; church remains visible to 19th century; damaged high cross re-erected 18th century; (NIEA)	Domnach-mor-maige-imclair	54°31′52″N 6°48′48″W
Donaghrisk Priory	Donaghrisk old graveyard - County Tyrone	order unknown founded 1294 by a member of the O'Hagan family	Domnach-riascad; Donarisk	54°36′31″N 6°44′32″W
Dromore Abbey		Cistercian monks purportedly founded on the site of early nunnery (see immediately below); burnt 1690;		54°30′45″N 7°27′47″W
Dromore Monastery		early monastic site, nuns, founded by St Patrick; purportedly on the site of later Cistercian abbey (see immediately above)	Druim-Dubhain Cluain-Dubhain	54°30′45″N 7°27′47″W
Drumragh Monastery	Drumragh Graveyard - geograph.org.uk - 95904	early monastic site, patron St Colmcille; erenagh land until 16th/17th century	Druim-raithe; Dromeraa; Little Abbey	54°34′28″N 7°17′39″W
Dungannon Friary		Franciscan Friars, Third Order Regular founded c.1489 by Con O'Neal (Con McHenry McOwen); dissolved 1607; granted to Richard Nugent, Baron of Delvin 1611	Ballysaggart; Ballinesaggirt; Baile Sagairt	54°30′03″N 6°46′09″W (approx.)
Dungannon Friary		Franciscan Friars, First Order founded after the Restoration 1687; dissolved 1817		
Dunmisk Monastery		early monastic site, founded by St Patrick; patron Presbyter Meascáin	Domnach Meascáin; Domnach Mescan; Dún Meascáin	54°34′52″N 7°01′50″W
Errigal Keerogue Monastery		early monastic site, patron St Ciaran, founded before 506 by St Macartin; Franciscan St Kieran's church built on site	Airecal-da-chiaroc; Errigal Keeroge	54°27′31″N 7°05′53″W
Glenarb Monastery		early monastic site	Cluain-oirb; Clonarb	54°23′38″N 6°50′13″W (approx.)
Kilskeery Monastery		early monastic site, founded 749; erenagh into 16th century	Cell-scire; Kilskirry	54°26′30″N 7°32′26″W (approx.)
Leckpatrick Monastery	Old Leckpatrick Graveyard, Ballymagorry, May 2010 (02)	early monastic site; erenagh land until after 1600	Cell-patrick; Magherynelec	54°52′01″N 7°25′22″W
Longfield Monastery		early monastic site; erenagh at least until 1609	Lemchaill; Leamcoil; Lauchyll; Langfield	
Magheraglass Priory		early monastic site, probably founded 6th century by St Columcille; Augustinian Canons Regular — Arroasian dependent on Armagh; founded 1242 by Terence O'Hagan; possibly dissolved by c.1400; converted into a fortress by the O'Hagans during the Elizabethan wars	Magh-erir-di-ghlais; Maghcolum-cille; Maghlemchailli?	54°38′36″N 6°50′45″W (approx.)
Omagh Friary		Franciscan Friars, Third Order Regular founded 1464; dissolved c.1603; granted to Sir Henry Piers, assigned to Sir Daniel Lee; an ivy-clad wall along the riverbank by Abbey Bridge is purportedly part of a monastic foundation	An-Omach; fOmach; Ogmag; Oghmagh	54°36′09″N 7°18′22″W
Omagh Monastery		early monastic site, apparently founded by 792 (though may refer to Drumragh, supra)	An-Omach; fOmach; Ogmag; Oghmagh	
Pubble Friary		Franciscan Friars, Third Order Regular founded before 1500; dissolved c.1603; granted to Sir Henry Piers, assigned to Sir Daniel Lee	Popu; Pobul; Puble	54°43′27″N 7°24′14″W (approx.)
Scarvagherin Friary		Franciscan Friars, Third Order Regular founded c.1456; dissolved c.1603; granted to Sir Henry Piers	Scairb-an-ciothrainn; Garvaghkeirinn; Gervaghkerin	54°42′48″N 7°31′18″W
Strabane Friary		purported Franciscan Friars, Third Order Regular founded 14th century; (Note: Strabane — Thomas de Burgo, Hibernica Dominicana (ed. 1762) 747) (though Franciscans did not arrive until late 17th century); merged with Scarvaherin, supra		54°49′37″N 7°27′42″W
Termonamongan Monastery	St Caireall's Graveyard - geograph.org.uk - 698760	early monastic site, founded 6th century, patron St Caireall, erenaghs at least to c.1411	Termon-ui-mhaoin; Magherakeel; Kylchyrryll; Cill Chairill; St Caireall's church	54°39′52″N 7°43′02″W
Termonmaguirk Monastery		early monastic site, purportedly founded by St Colmcille; land owned by the Maguirk family 16th century	Termon-cumaing; Termon-Comyn	54°33′29″N 7°10′21″W (approx.)
Trillick Monastery		early monastic site, purportedly founded by 613	Trelec-mor; Trelick	54°27′08″N 7°29′21″W (approx.)

== See also ==
- List of monastic houses in Ireland

== Map link to lists of monastic houses in Ireland by county ==
Click on a county to go to the corresponding article.	Antrim; Armagh; Down; Fermanagh; Londonderry; Tyrone; Carlow; Cavan; Clare; Cork; Donegal; Dublin; Galway; Kerry; Kildare; Kilkenny; Laois; Leitrim; Limerick; Longford; Louth; Mayo; Meath; Monaghan; Offaly; Roscommon; Sligo; Tipperary; Waterford; Westmeath; Wexford; Wicklow
