= List of monastic houses in County Waterford =

The smaller establishments such as monastic cells and notable monastic granges (particularly those with resident monks) and camerae of the military orders of monks (Knights Templars and Knights Hospitallers) are included. The numerous monastic hospitals per se are not included here unless at some time the foundation had, or was purported to have, the status or function of an abbey, priory, or preceptory/commandery.

== Layout ==
Communities/provenance: shows the status and communities existing at each establishment, together with such dates as have been established as well as the fate of the establishment after dissolution, and the current status of the site.

Formal name or dedication: shows the formal name of the establishment or the person in whose name the church is dedicated, where known.

Alternative names: some of the establishments have had alternative names over the course of time. In order to assist in text-searching such alternatives in name or spelling have been provided.

== Abbreviations and key ==
The sites listed are ruins or fragmentary remains unless indicated thus:
| * | current monastic function |
| + | current non-monastic ecclesiastic function |
| ^ | current non-ecclesiastic function |
| = | remains incorporated into later structure |
| # | no identifiable trace of the monastic foundation remains |
| ~ | exact site of monastic foundation unknown |
| ø | possibly no such monastic foundation at location |
| ¤ | no such monastic foundation |
| ≈ | identification ambiguous or confused |

Locations with names in italics indicate probable duplication (misidentification with another location) or non-existent foundations (either erroneous reference or proposed foundation never implemented).

Trusteeship denoted as follows:
| NIEA | Scheduled Monument (NI) |
| NM | National Monument (ROI) |
| C.I. | Church of Ireland |
| R.C. | Roman Catholic Church |

| Foundation | Image | Communities & provenance | Formal name or dedication & alternative names | References & location |
|---|---|---|---|---|
| Achad-crimthain Monastery ^{~} | | early monastic site, founded before 829; possibly located in County Waterford | | |
| Achad-dagain Monastery ^{~} | | early monastic site, founded before 639 | | |
| Ardmore Cathedral | | early monastic site, Gaelic monks, founded in the 5th century by St Declan; diocesan cathedral 1152; see united with Lismore after 1210? | St Declan's Church | 51°56′56″N 7°43′34″W |
| Ardmore Friary ^{~?} | | Augustinian Friars | | |
| Ballyvoony Preceptory | | purported Knights Templar "Monastery (in ruins)" (Note: Ordnance Survey) | | 52°08′13″N 7°26′38″W |
| Bewley Camera | | purported Knights Templar foundation unknown; dissolution unknown; remains of monastic building 1774; "Abbey" | Beaulieu; Beal | 52°06′43″N 7°49′25″W |
| Cappagh Preceptory ^{ø} | | purported Knights Hospitaller remains probably not ecclesiastical | Ceapach | 52°07′32″N 7°44′44″W |
| Carrickbeg Friary | | Franciscan Friars Minor, Conventual founded 1336 by James Butler, Earl of Desmond; dissolved 1540, surrendered by 'Prior' William Cormoke 7 April 1540; granted to Thomas, Earl of Ormond; the friars returned in 1669, a new church was built in 1822 which remained in use until 2006 when the friary was closed. | | 52°20′39″N 7°25′02″W |
| Cathair-mac-conchaid Monastery ^{~} | | early monastic site, founded by the 7th century | Cathair-mic-conaich | |
| Clashmore Monastery | | early monastic site, founded before 646-56 by Cuancheir, a monk, on the instruction of St Mochoemoc of Leamakevoge | Glaismor | 52°00′34″N 7°49′09″W |
| Crooke Preceptory | | Knights Templar founded before 1180, by the Barons of Curroghmore?; manor granted by Henry II; dissolved 1308-11; Knights Hospitaller founded after 1314; dissolved after 1348; later farmed out; held by William Wyse by 1541 | An Crusc; Cruadach; Cork; Croc | 52°13′41″N 6°58′47″W |
| Curraheen Friary | | Franciscan Friars — from Youghal placed of settlement after the suppression; in vicinity 1731 | Keeran | 52°04′12″N 7°49′22″W |
| Disert-nairbre Monastery | | early monastic site, cell founded by St Medoc of Ferns | Bolhendesert; Dysert?; Ballindysart? | |
| Dungarvan Monastery | | early monastic site, founded in the 7th century by St Garvan | Dun Garbhan | 52°05′13″N 7°37′06″W |
| Dungarvan Priory | | Augustinian Friars founded c.1290 by Thomas, Lord Offaly; dissolved 1541; church found to be parochial by 19 January 1541; leased to Roger Dalton 1595 | Dun Garbhan | 52°05′16″N 7°36′38″W |
| Dungarvan, St Augustine's Priory * | | Augustinian Friars extant | | 52°05′19″N 7°37′08″W |
| Kilbarry Preceptory | | Knights Templar founded before 1180, church granted by deed of Henry II; dissolved 1308-11; Knights Hospitaller founded after 1514; dissolved before 1527, farmed out | Cell-barra | 52°14′31″N 7°07′46″W |
| Killbunny Monastery | | early monastic site | Cell-bhunna | 52°16′17″N 7°17′39″W |
| Kilculliheen Abbey | | Augustinian nuns — Arroasian dependent on St Mary de Hogges, Dublin; priory founded 1151 by Dermot Mac Murrough, King of Leinster; independent, raised to abbey status before 1257; dissolved 1540, surrendered by Abbess Isabella Mothing granted to Sir Edmund Butler 1566; granted to the town of Waterford 1582-3 | Cell-cleeheen; Kellinge; Killaylyhin; Kylkyllin; de Bello Portu | 52°15′49″N 7°05′34″W |
| Killongford Preceptory? | | by tradition Knights Templar also erroneously given as Knights of St John of Jerusalem (Note: Mervyn Archdall, Monasticon Hibernicum, 1786) | Killunkert | |
| Kilmacleague Monastery | | early monastic site, founded in the 5th century by St Mac Liag, disciple of St Declan of Ardmore | Cell-mic-liag | 52°10′00″N 7°04′30″W |
| Kilmolash Monastery | | early monastic site, founded by St Molaise (of Leighlin?); plundered by the Norsemen 833 | Cell-o-laise | 52°06′16″N 7°48′34″W |
| Lismore Cathedral ^{=+} | | early monastic site, founded 636 by St Carthach (Mo-chuda); diocesan cathedral 1111; see united to Waterford 1362; early monastic site, nuns; Augustinian Friars | St Carthagh; ____________________; Leasa-moir; Liss-mor; Les-mor | 52°08′23″N 7°55′46″W |
| Lismore Monastery | | early monastic site, nuns, founded in the 7th century, strictly separate from the monks' monastery (see immediately above) | | |
| Lismore — St Brigid's Hospital | | early leper hospital under a prior, with possible Culdee connections until the 12th century; | St Brigid | 52°08′02″N 7°55′55″W (?) |
| Little Island Monastery ^{~} | | early monastic site, possibly located in County Wexford | Inisdoimle, County Wexford? | |
| Molana Abbey | | early monastic site, founded in the 6th century by St Molanfide (Maelanfaid); Augustinian Canons Regular founded after 1140?; dissolved 1541; granted to Sir Walter Raleigh 1587?; passed to others 1588 | Ailen-mail-anfaid; Dairinis Mael-anfaid; Insula St Molanfiede; Moel-anfaidh; Maylanfay; Melahanahyd; Muyllhanuha | 52°00′08″N 7°53′57″W |
| Mothel Abbey | | early monastic site, founded in the 6th century by St Brogan; early monastery asserted by some to have become Cistercian (Note: James Ware, De Hibernia, et Antiquitatibus ejus, edition of 1654, p.196); Augustinian Canons Regular founded after 1140? dissolved 1540, surrendered by Abbot Edmund Power 7 April 1540; church found to be parochial by 19 January 1541; occupied by Lary Katherine Butler 1548; (NM) | Maothail; Motalia; Mothil; SS Brogan and Cronan; at Ballynevin | 52°17′54″N 7°25′06″W |
| Mount Melleray Abbey | | Cistercian monks founded 1833 | | 52°11′14″N 7°51′25″W |
| Rincrew Abbey, Rincrew Hill | | Knights Templar founded c.1180?, purportedly by Raymond Le Gros; dissolved 1308? 330; traditionally/erroneously Knights Hospitaller; Augustinian Canons Regular passed to Molana; dissolved with Molana 1541; granted to Sir Walter Raleigh 1587; assigned to the Earl of Cork | Temple Michael; Rhincrew; Rin-Crioch; Rinncru; Ryncrowe | 51°58′49″N 7°51′42″W |
| Stradbally Abbey ^{ø} | | erroneously asserted Augustinian Friars; "Abbey" ruins (Note: Richard Hopkins Ryland, The History, Topography and Antiquities of the County and City of Waterford ..., p.301) non-monastic | | 52°07′47″N 7°27′51″W |
| Tallow Carmelite Monastery | | Carmelite nuns | St Joseph | 52°05′31″N 8°00′27″W |
| Waterford Cathedral | | monastic episcopal cathedral founded 1096; diocesan cathedral 1111; see united to Lismore 1363 | Cell-mic-liag; Port Lairge | 52°15′36″N 7°06′27″W |
| Waterford — St Catherine's Priory | | Augustinian Canons Regular — Victorine founded before 1207 by Elias Fitz Norman; dissolved 1539, surrendered by Prior Edmund Power; occupied by James Shurloke, per James White; granted to Lady Elizabeth Butler, alias Sherlock, 1588-9; Augustinian Friars apparently refounded 1629 | St Catherine ____________________; St Catherine's Abbey | 52°15′27″N 7°06′22″W |
| Waterford — St John's Priory Hospital | | Benedictine monks founded c.1190 Benedictine monks and nuns from 1202; cell dependent on Bath from 1204; dissolved 1536; granted to William Wise November 1536 | St John the Evangelist | 52°15′25″N 7°06′45″W |
| Waterford — St Saviour's Priory | | Dominican Friars community founded 1226; approval for priory granted by Henry III 1235 dissolved 1540; church sold to James White, occupier, by 18 January 1541; surrendered by Prior William Marten 2 April 1541; granted to Sir Anthony St Leger; Waterford Dominican community died out 1865; restored 1867 | St Saviour | 52°15′48″N 7°07′09″W |
| Waterford Greyfriars | | Franciscan Friars Minor, Conventual founded 1240-5 by Sir Hugh Purcell, buried here; Observant Franciscan Friars reformed 1521; dissolved 1540, surrendered by 'Prior' John Linche 2 April 1540; granted to Patrick Walshe and to the brethren and poor of the Hospital of the Holy Spirit 1 September 1541; hospital established in the church — continuing into the 19th century | | 52°15′38″N 7°06′24″W |
| Waterford Greyfriars, later site | | Franciscan Friars founded 1612 | | |
| Waterford Franciscan Friary * | | Franciscan Friars founded 1830; church completed 1834; extant | | 52°15′36″N 7°06′32″W |

== Map link to lists of monastic houses in Ireland by county ==
| Click on a county to go to the corresponding article. | Antrim; Armagh; Down; Fermanagh; Londonderry; Tyrone; Carlow; Cavan; Clare; Cork; Donegal; Dublin; Galway; Kerry; Kildare; Kilkenny; Laois; Leitrim; Limerick; Longford; Louth; Mayo; Meath; Monaghan; Offaly; Roscommon; Sligo; Tipperary; Waterford; Westmeath; Wexford; Wicklow |

== See also ==
- List of monastic houses in Ireland
