= List of monastic houses in County Westmeath =

The smaller establishments such as monastic cells and notable monastic granges (particularly those with resident monks) and camerae of the military orders of monks (Knights Templars and Knights Hospitallers) are included. The numerous monastic hospitals per se are not included here unless at some time the foundation had, or was purported to have, the status or function of an abbey, priory, or preceptory/commandery.

== Layout ==
Communities/provenance: shows the status and communities existing at each establishment, together with such dates as have been established as well as the fate of the establishment after dissolution, and the current status of the site.

Formal name or dedication: shows the formal name of the establishment or the person in whose name the church is dedicated, where known.

Alternative names: some of the establishments have had alternative names over the course of time. In order to assist in text-searching such alternatives in name or spelling have been provided.

== Abbreviations and key ==
The sites listed are ruins or fragmentary remains unless indicated thus:
*	current monastic function
+	current non-monastic ecclesiastic function
^	current non-ecclesiastic function
=	remains incorporated into later structure
#	no identifiable trace of the monastic foundation remains
~	exact site of monastic foundation unknown
ø	possibly no such monastic foundation at location
¤	no such monastic foundation
≈	identification ambiguous or confused

Locations with names in italics indicate probable duplication (misidentification with another location) or non-existent foundations (either erroneous reference or proposed foundation never implemented).

Trusteeship denoted as follows:
NIEA	Scheduled Monument (NI)
NM	National Monument (ROI)
C.I.	Church of Ireland
R.C.	Roman Catholic Church

Foundation	Image	Communities & provenance	Formal name or dedication & alternative names	References & location
Ardcharn Monastery ^{≈}		early monastic site — actually located in County Roscommon	Ardcharn in Westmeath	
Ardnacrany Friary		Carmelite Friars founded c.1291 by Robert Dillon, Lord of Drumrany, possibly without license; (erroneously purported Dominican Friars) possibly the house licensed 1329; dissolved c.1540; granted to Robert Dillon 1546 friars re-established in Moate	Ardicarne; Athnecarne	53°31′28″N 7°46′43″W
Athlone Priory		Cluniac monks — possibly from France traditionally founded c.1150 by Turlough O'Conor, High King of Ireland; in existence before 1208-10; dissolved c.1542, before 1567; granted to Sir Richard Bingham, Commissioner for Galway, c.1589	St Peter; SS Peter and Paul ____________________; Athluain; Baile-ath-luain; Blahluin; Haulon; de Innocentia	53°25′34″N 7°56′34″W
Athlone Franciscan Friary *		Franciscan Friars founded c.1723; extant		53°25′23″N 7°56′16″W
Athlone Friary		Franciscan Friars Minor, Conventual founded c.1239 by Charles de Burgo or the Dillon family (possibly Sir Henry Dillon) or the Digby family (earlier attribution of founding 1224 by Cathal Crovderg O'Conor dubious); church consecrated 1241; dissolved 1567-8: destroyed; friars probably remained in the community in the town; Observant Franciscan Friars reformed 1587; moved to place of refuge at Killinure, infra; new house built nearby (see immediately below)	Athluain; Baile-ath-luain; Blahluin; Haulon	
Athlone Greyfriars		Observant Franciscan Friars founded 1626		53°25′22″N 7°56′18″W
Athlone Monastery		early monastic site according to tradition (historically County Roscommon)	Athluain; Baile-ath-luain; Blahluin; Haulon; Cloonowen? County Roscommon	
Athlone Austin Friary		Augustinian Friars (Note: Lubin: Louis Augustin Alemand, Monasticon Hibernicum, translated and edited by John Stevens, 1722, pp.310,312,331) founded on the Roscommon side of Athlone	Athluain; Baile-ath-luain; Blahluin; Haulon	
Athlone Convent		Poor Clares nuns founded between c.1725 and c.1750	Athluain; Baile-ath-luain; Blahluin; Haulon	
Athnecarne Friary ^{≈}		Dominican Friars — confusion of Ardnacrany Carmelites, supra	Ardnacrany	
Ballyboggan Priory		Augustinian Canons Regular dissolved; granted to Sir William Bermingham 1541	The Priory Church of the Holy Trinity, Ballyboggan ____________________; De Laude Dei	53°24′35″N 7°02′38″W
Ballymore Priory		Augustinian Canons Regular founded c.1250?; possibly connected to Tristernagh, and possible chaplains to Cistercian nuns (see immediately below); dissolved 1540, church ruinous; leased to Francis Shaen 1593	Baile-mor-locha-semhdidhe; Loch-seudi; Loch-sydy; Lox; Plare; Plary Abbey	53°29′22″N 7°40′07″W
Ballymore Priory		Cistercian nuns founded 1218 by a de Lacy; suggested, probably erroneously, by the presence of the Canons' priory in the vicinity (see immediately above) to have been a Gilbertine double monastery; dissolved 1470; Augustinian Canons — from Ballymore (see immediately above); passed to the canons 1475, who possibly transferred here	St Mary ____________________; Loughsewdy; Loch-seudi; Loch-sydy; Lox; Plare	
Ballymore Abbey		early monastic site, purportedly founded c.700 (Note: A. Cogan, The Diocese of Meath, 1862-70, ii, p.552)	Baile-mor-locha-semhdidhe; Loch-seudi; Loch-sydy; Lox; Plare	
Ballymore Cistercian Priory ^{≈}		erroneous record of Cistercian monks — actually the canons' priory, supra	Baile-mor-locha-semhdidhe; Loch-seudi; Loch-sydy; Lox; Plare	
Bethlehem Convent		Poor Clares nuns founded between c.1725 and c.1750	Bethlem	
Butvather Friary ^{≈}		Franciscan Friars, First Order probably Athlone Conventual Franciscan Friary	Bukrather-Brawny; Butvather, in Brawny	
Castletown Abbey ^{ø}		"Abbey", (Note: Ordnance Survey) non-monastic ruins	Baile-chaislean	53°26′41″N 7°29′10″W
Church Island Monastery, Lough Owel		early monastic site, reputedly founded by St Lomman	Inis-mor	53°34′06″N 7°22′18″W
Clonfad Monastery		early monastic site, possibly founded 6th century by St Colmcille; in existence 779	Cluain-fodae; Cluain-fota-baitan; Cluain-fota-baedan-aba; Cluain-fota-bile; Ecra Tulach	53°27′21″N 7°10′40″W
Clonfad Monastery		early monastic site, presumably founded 6th century by St Finnian of Clonard; church burned 887	Cluain-fodae; Cluain-fota-libren; Cluain-fota-fine	53°24′49″N 7°23′29″W
Cluain-moescnae Monastery ^{~}		early monastic site	Cluain-maosena; Cluain-mhaoscna; Cluain-mecsua	
Collinstown Priory		Augustinian nuns — Arroasian dependent on Clonard founded after 1144, church confirmed to the nuns of Clonard; dissolved after 1195; transferred with Clonard to Odder c.1383-4	St Mary ____________________; Kellarthalgach; Fore St Mary; Fawor	53°38′58″N 7°13′02″W
Conry Monastery		early monastic site, founded 7th century?	Combraire	53°29′13″N 7°31′39″W
Druim-corcortri Monastery ^{~}		early monastic site, founded 5th century by St Patrick for Diarmait — possibly located in County Westmeath	Druim-corcthri; Druim-corkaree; Druim-corcortri, in Meath	
Drumraney Monastery		early monastic site, hermitage founded before 588; in existence 995	Druim-raite; Drumrath	53°28′42″N 7°44′43″W (approx)
Dysart Tola		early monastic site, founded before 738 by St Tola; burned by Domhnall mac Murchadh 790	Disert-tuala; Disert-tola	53°35′36″N 7°08′46″W (approx)
Faughalstown Monastery		early monastic site, patronised by St Diarmaid 6th century	Caille-fohlada; Fochlaidh; Faughly	53°38′40″N 7°19′55″W
Fooran Priory		Franciscan? nuns, possibly Second Order, Poor Clare nuns founded before 1385?; dissolved before 1603 (during the reign of Queen Elizabeth?; ruinous by 1605	Farren; Farren Macheigkese	53°25′37″N 7°46′25″W (?)
Fooran Friary		Franciscan Friars, probably Third Order Regular ruinous by 1605	Fuaran; Farrenemannagh	
Fore Anchorite's Cell		Anchorites dissolved 1616 on the death of the last hermit		53°40′53″N 7°13′47″W
Fore Priory		early monastic site, founded c. 630 by St Feichin; probably dissolved c.1180, when succeeded by the Benedictine establishment, (see immediately below); recorded 13th century coarbs possibly titular; suggested Augustinian Canons Regular c.12th century — evidence lacking	Fobhar; Fobar-fechin; Ballyleabhair; Foure	
Fore Priory		Benedictine monks alien priory: dependent on Evreux; founded before 1185, churches and other endowments granted to Evereux by Hugh de Lacy; buildings incorporated into the town's fortifications 1428; became denizen: independent from 1449; dissolved 1539, surrendered by Prior William Nugent, 27 November 1539; granted to Matthew King 1540; (NM)	SS Taurin and Fechin	53°41′02″N 7°13′38″W
Fore Hospitallers		Knights Hospitaller frankhouse recorded 1541		
Foyran Monastery		early monastic site, patronised and probably founded by St Edan		53°44′51″N 7°17′46″W
Friarstown Friary		Dominican Friars founded c.1691; dissolved 1733	Killenough; (Note: Rev. Dr. W. Moran, Riocht na Midhe, ii, No.3 (1961), pp.9-15); Killendough; Killenough; — in Clonfad parish	
Hare Island Priory		early monastic site, founded before 542 by St Ciaran of Clonmacnois; Augustinian Canons Regular founded after 1140?; cell dependent on Saints' Island? from before 1259?; dissolved before 1500?, probably abandoned some time before the general suppression	Inis Ainghin; Inish Inneen; Oilean Aingin; Saints Island, Lough Ree	53°28′16″N 7°55′49″W
Inchbofin		early monastic site, founded mid-5th century by St Rioch; burned and plundered by the Norsemen on several occasions; church plundered by the Munstermen 1089; suggested Augustinian Canons Regular during the reign of Henry VIII — documentary evidence lacking	Inis-bofin; Inis-boffin, Lough Ree	53°32′30″N 7°55′02″W
Inchmore Priory		early monastic site, founded 5th century? by Liberius (Lioban), son of Losenus; Augustinian Canons Regular founded before c.1170?; cell? dependent on Saints' Island after 1200; dissolved before 1500?, possibly abandoned some time before the general suppression; granted to Sir Richard Barnwell	Inismor-Loch-Ribh; Inismor-Lough Ree	53°30′41″N 7°56′22″W
Kilbeggan Monastery		early monastic site, founded 6th/7th century by St Beccan (Becan, son of Murchade?); Cistercian monks — from Mellifont founded 1150, possibly by the MacCoughlan family; subject to Buildwas 1228; dissolved before 1549; part granted to Robert Dillon 1560; granted to William Browne 1595	Cell-becain; Kilbecain; de Benedicto Dei; 'The Church of the Relic', Kilbeggan	53°21′38″N 7°29′52″W (approx)
Kilbixy Monastery		early monastic site, monks (Note: Healy, History of the Diocese of Meath, 1, 48) and nuns founded by St Bicsech the Virgin?	Cell-bicsige	53°36′10″N 7°30′56″W
Kilcumreragh Monastery		early monastic site, reputedly founded by St Fiachra; sometimes confused with Conry, supra	Cell-cruimthir	53°24′39″N 7°41′33″W
Kilkenny West Priory Hospital		early monastic site, founded c.mid-6th century by St Canice; Crutched Friars founded after 1200 by the Tyrrell family or by Fr Thomas Dillon, priest, buried here; listed 15th century as Hospitallers dissolved before 1541?; granted to Robert Dillon 1569	St John ____________________; Cell-cainnig; Kil-caynne; Kil-kencayd; Kil-kay; Kil-kykenne	53°29′22″N 7°48′55″W
Killalea Monastery ^{~}		early monastic site, sometimes mistaken for Killulagh, supra		
Killare Monastery		early monastic site, founded by St Aedh mac Bricc; site now occupied by remains of old parish church	Cell-air; Kill-aria	53°28′59″N 7°34′46″W
Killinure Friary ^{~}		Observant Franciscan Friars — from Athlone place of refuge		
Killucan Monastery		early monastic site, founded by St Luican (Lucain)	Cell-lucain; Killuken	53°30′49″N 7°08′39″W
Killulagh Monastery		early monastic site, patronised 5th century (during the time of St Patrick) by St Lonan; also given as County Offaly, and mistaken for Killalea	Cell-oilach; Cell-uaillech; Kilhuailleach, County Offaly	53°35′23″N 7°09′03″W
Kiltoom Monastery		early monastic site, founded 5th century	Cell-toma; Kill-toma	53°40′08″N 7°21′27″W (approx)
Kinard Nunnery		monks, according to local tradition — order and foundation unknown; land granted to Augustinian Canons Regular of Tristernagh 1293; Franciscan Sisters, Third Order founded before 1650	Ceannard; Chinn-Aird; Kenard; Kinnard; Mainister Chinn Aird	53°43′11″N 7°27′21″W
Lackan Monastery		early monastic site, founded 5th century? possibly by St Patrick?; possibly in existence 946; remains extant 1837	Leachan; Lecan-midi; Leckin	53°38′15″N 7°25′35″W
Lough Ennell Monastery		details to be established		
Lynn Monastery		early monastic site; some confusion with Linnleire (Lann-Leire), i.e. Dunleer, supra; site currently occupied by Lynn House	Lann-mic-luachain	53°29′45″N 7°21′51″W
Mullingar Austin Friars		Augustinian Friars; site marked by modern statue		53°31′34″N 7°20′13″W
Mullingar Priory		Augustinian Canons Regular founded c.1227 by Ralph Petit, Bishop of Meath; destroyed by the people of Managh 1464; leased out by Prior John Petyt 1534-8; dissolved 1539, surrendered by Prior John Petyt 28 November 1539; possibly Augustinian Friars founded before 1643?	Muilenn-cerr; Muileann-chear; Molingar; Molyngerre	53°31′29″N 7°20′22″W
Mullingar Friary		Dominican Friars founded 1237 or Mary 1238 by the Nugent family or the Pettit family; granted to Sir Gerald FitzGerald of Crowboy for 21 years, 24 April 1540; declared dissolved 10 October 1540 by the withdrawal of the prior and convent; granted to Thomas Gorie 1564; granted to Walter Hope 1565-6; granted to James Hope 1610	St Mary of the Assumption; The Holy Trinity; St Saviour	53°31′26″N 7°20′35″W
Mullingar Blackfriars		Dominican Friars founded soon after 1622		
Mullingar Greyfriars		Franciscan Friars — from Multyfarnham attempted foundation 1622		
Mullingar Greyfriars		Capuchin Franciscan Friars founded c.1642?		
Mullingar Hospitallers		Knights Hospitaller "... a house [of Hospitallers?]"; (Note: Extents of Irish Monastic Possessions 1540-1, edited Newport D. White (Irish Manuscripts Commission), 1943, p.115) ^{(}^{)} probably a frankhouse	Molyngare	
Multyfarnham Friary *		Franciscan Friars, Conventual founded 1236 (before 1268?) (during the reign of Henry III) by William Delmar; also given as 1270 or 1276 by L William Herebeard FitzHerbert (Delamare) and 1306 (Note: A. Cogan, The Diocese of Meath, 1862-70, iii, p.591); Observant Franciscan Friars reformed 1460; dissolved 1540, abandoned by the friars 7 October 1540; granted to Edmund Field, Patrick Clynch and Philip Penteney sometime between 1540 and 1546 (renewed 1546) friars permitted to remain in occupation; recommended for restoration 1540 (during the reign of Queen Mary); in use as a place of refuge; burned twice and raided several times between 1590 and 1617; reoccupied 1827	Mbuailtibh Farannain; Molinfarnam; Montisfernandi; Multifernam	53°37′43″N 7°23′28″W
Multyfarnham Blackfriars, earlier site?		Dominican Friars suggested to have been here prior to moving to Mullingar — evidence lacking		
Pass of Kilbride Abbey		"Abbey ruins" (Note: Ordnance Survey and Memorial Atlas of Ireland, 1901)	Bealach-Chilli-Brighde	53°26′45″N 7°13′37″W
Rahugh Monastery		early monastic site founded before 589 by St Aedh mac Bricc, bishop; in existence 859	Rath-aeda-mic-bric; Raith-aida; Rathugh	53°20′11″N 7°26′16″W
Rathaspick Monastery ^{~}		early monastic site, purportedly founded before 589 by Aedh mac Bricc — evidence lacking; in existence 898		
Russagh Monastery ^{ø≈}		possible early monastic site — probably Russagh, County Laois	Ros-ach; Ros each	
Taughmon Monastery		early monastic site, founded before 635-6 by St Fintan Munna	Tech-munna; Taghmon	53°35′59″N 7°14′58″W
Teaghbaithen Monastery ^{ø≈~}		early monastic site — possibly Tibhoin, County Roscommon	Taghboyne	
Teernacreeve Monastery		early monastic site, possibly founded 6th century by St Colmcille for St Lugaid, his disciple	St Lugaid? ____________________; Tir-da-chroeb; Tir-da-craeb	
Temple Macateer		early monastic site, possibly founded by St Ciaran mac an tsaoir	Tempall-maic-in-tsaeir	53°24′21″N 7°36′12″W
Templenesagart Friary ^{≈}		friars, apparently Franciscan Friars, probably Third Order Regular	Templenesgarth; possibly Kinard	
Tobercormick Priory?		Augustinian Canons Regular (Note: Harris's Table, Ware-Harris, Antiquities, p.264) possible canons' house probably extinct long before 1488 Dominican 200	Tobar-Cormac; Fons Cormaci; Well of Cormac by Toberville	53°30′39″N 7°35′35″W (approx)
Tobercormick Friary ^{#}		Dominican Friars founded c.1488, license granted by Innocent III, at the petition of Edmund de Lantu, to build a friary 1488; dissolved before 1589, when in ownership of Francis Shane, gent.; granted to H. Matthews, termor; assigned to Sir Francis Shane; no monastic remains apparent		
Tristernagh Priory		Augustinian Canons Regular founded c.1200 by Geoffrey de Constentin (Galfred de Constantine); dissolved 1539, surrendered by Prior commendator Edmund Nugent, Bishop of Kilmore; granted to Robert Delman 10 December 1539 later in religious use; destroyed 1783	St Mary ____________________; Dristernach; Dryssternac; apud Kilbixy	53°35′56″N 7°28′46″W
Tuaim-inbhir Monastery ^{~≈}		early monastic site, founded before 916, possibly located in County Westmeath or County Tipperary	Druim-inbir (Dromineer, County Tipperary)	
Turbotstown Monastery ^{~}		early monastic site, founded before 809, possibly by St Fechin	Tibraid; Tibrada; Tippert?	
Tyfarnham Monastery ^{~}		early monastic site, founded before 880	Tech-erennain; Tech-airindan; Tech-farannain; Tech-ernain; Tech-ultan; Teach Faramain	53°34′54″N 7°20′27″W (approx)
Usnagh Monastery ^{~}		early monastic site, a cloister founded 5th century by St Patrick; demolished when he was driven away	Uisnach	

== Map link to lists of monastic houses in Ireland by county ==
Click on a county to go to the corresponding article.	Antrim; Armagh; Down; Fermanagh; Londonderry; Tyrone; Carlow; Cavan; Clare; Cork; Donegal; Dublin; Galway; Kerry; Kildare; Kilkenny; Laois; Leitrim; Limerick; Longford; Louth; Mayo; Meath; Monaghan; Offaly; Roscommon; Sligo; Tipperary; Waterford; Westmeath; Wexford; Wicklow

== See also ==
- List of monastic houses in Ireland
