= List of monastic houses in County Clare =

The smaller establishments such as monastic cells and notable monastic granges (particularly those with resident monks) and camerae of the military orders of monks (Knights Templars and Knights Hospitallers) are included. The numerous monastic hospitals per se are not included here unless at some time the foundation had, or was purported to have, the status or function of an abbey, priory, or preceptory/commandery.

== Layout ==
Communities/provenance: shows the status and communities existing at each establishment, together with such dates as have been established as well as the fate of the establishment after dissolution, and the current status of the site.

Formal name or dedication: shows the formal name of the establishment or the person in whose name the church is dedicated, where known.

Alternative names: some of the establishments have had alternative names over the course of time. In order to assist in text-searching such alternatives in name or spelling have been provided.

== Abbreviations and key ==
The sites listed are ruins or fragmentary remains unless indicated thus:
*	current monastic function
+	current non-monastic ecclesiastic function
^	current non-ecclesiastic function
=	remains incorporated into later structure
#	no identifiable trace of the monastic foundation remains
~	exact site of monastic foundation unknown
ø	possibly no such monastic foundation at location
¤	no such monastic foundation
≈	identification ambiguous or confused

Locations with names in italics indicate probable duplication (misidentification with another location) or non-existent foundations (either erroneous reference or proposed foundation never implemented).

Trusteeship denoted as follows:
NIEA	Scheduled Monument (NI)
NM	National Monument (ROI)
C.I.	Church of Ireland
R.C.	Roman Catholic Church

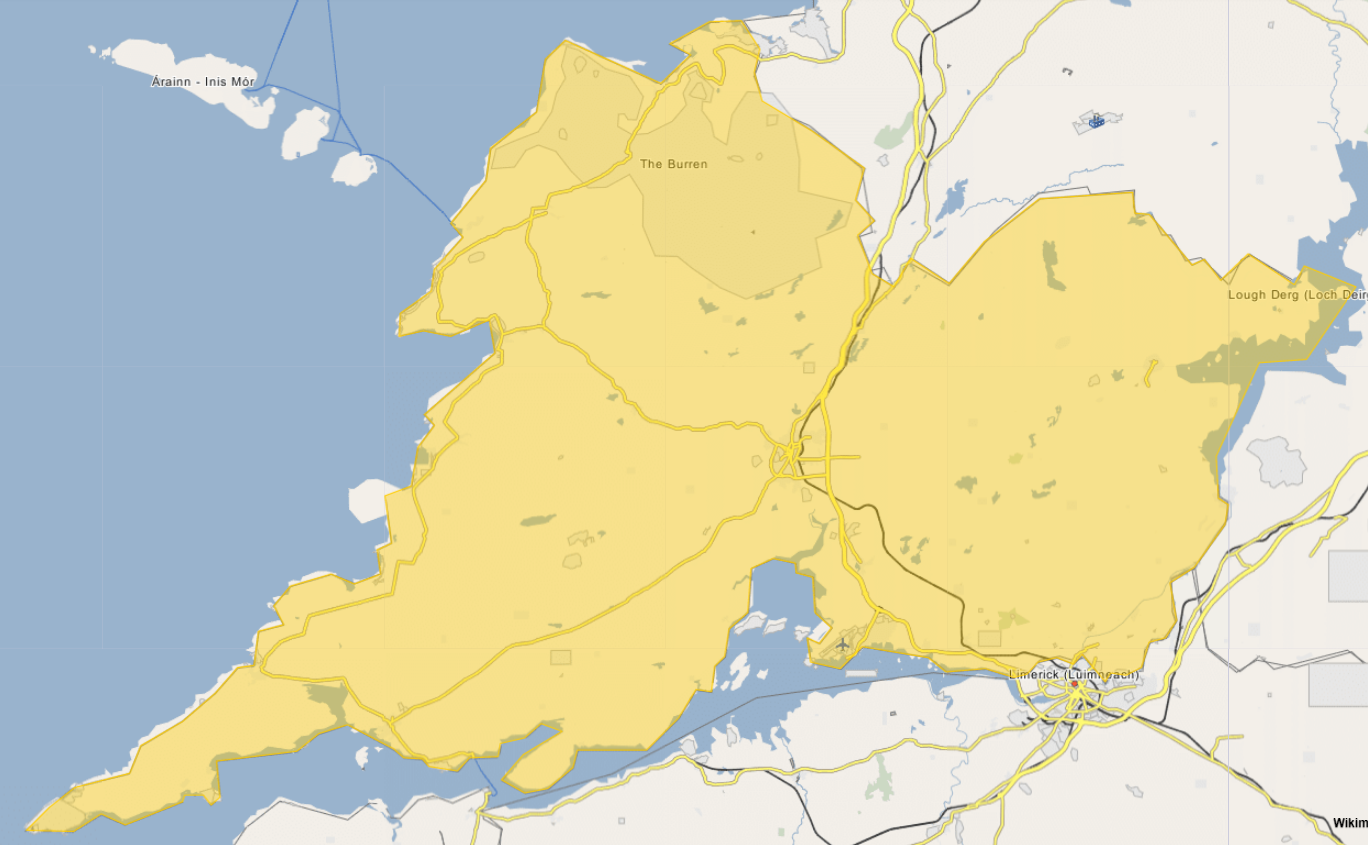
Locations of monastic houses in County Clare

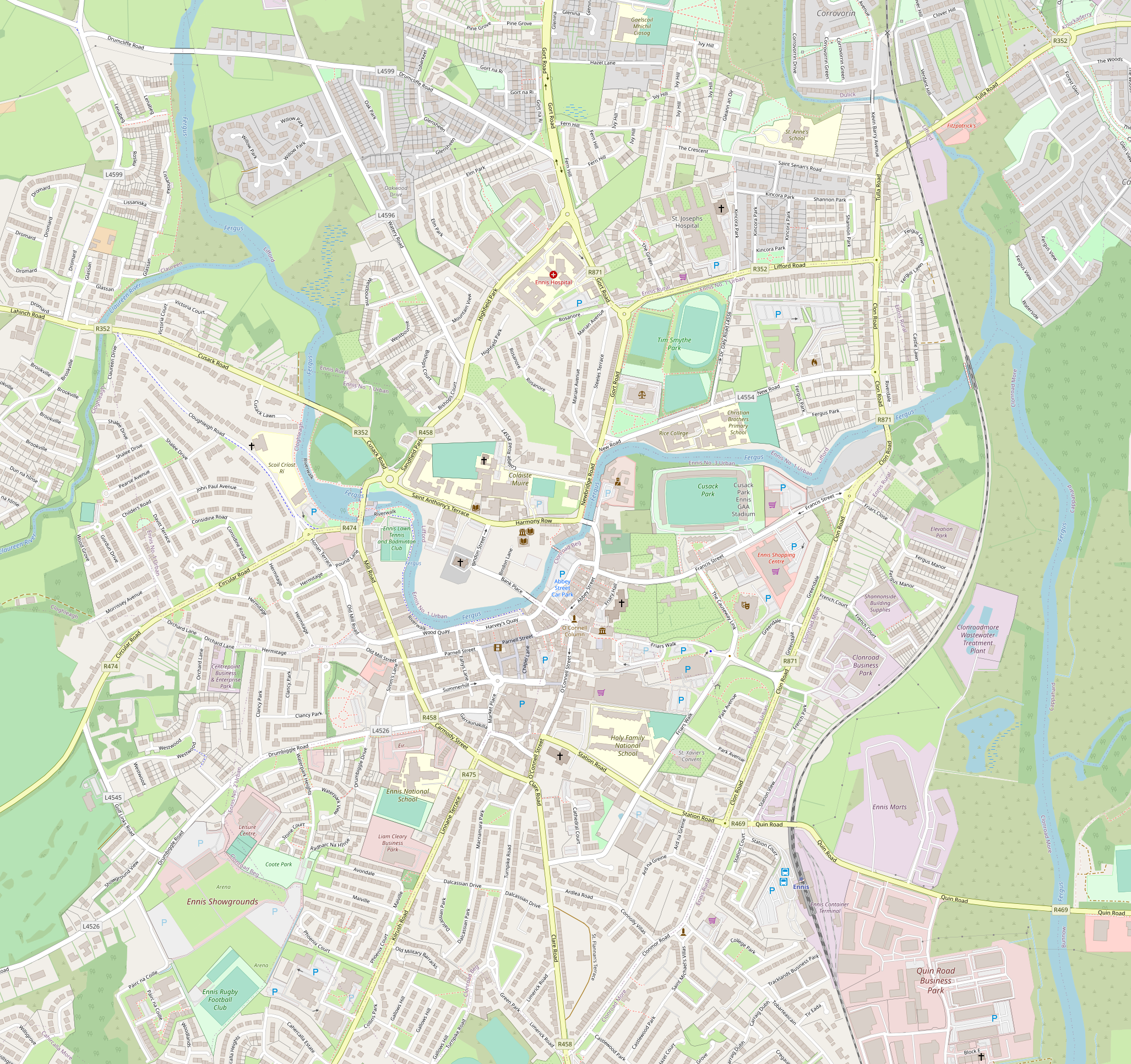
Locations of monastic houses in Ennis

Foundation	Image	Communities & provenance	Formal name or dedication & alternative names	References & location
Behagh Friary ^{ø} (Irish: Mainistir na Beithí)		Franciscan Friars, Third Order Regular (Note: Behagh given as County Clare by Mervyn Archdall, Monasticon Hibernicum, 1786, p.43 (W. B. Kelly, Dublin, publication p.72), mis-citing Sir James Ware; local tradition of friary at Behagh in County Clare probably originate from Archdall's error) — probable mistaken identification of Beagh, County Galway	Beagh	
Bishop's Island Monastery (Irish: Mainistir Oileán an Easpaig)		Gaelic monks founded 6th century by St Senan; remains of eremite monastery (Note: Bishop's Island remains of monastery, foundation attributed to St Senan — Lord Killanin & M. V. Duignan, Shell Guide to Ireland, 1962, (new edition 1967), p.321 (though not in 1989 edition))		52°40′29″N 9°41′28″W
Canon Island Abbey (Irish: Mainistir Oileán na gCanánach)		Augustinian Canons Regular founded c.1180? by Donald O'Brien, King of Limerick, probably on site of early monastery (see immediately below); dissolved before 1577; granted to Henry, Earl of Thomond; (NM)	Inisnegananagh Priory; Inis-negananagh; Inis-negananagad; Insula Canonicorum; Elanagranoch; Elaunaganaghe; Island of Saints	52°40′45″N 9°02′14″W
Canon Island Monastery		early monastic site, probably founded by St Senan; site possibly later occupied by Augustinian abbey (see immediately above)	Inisnegananagh Priory; Inis-negananagh; Inis-negananagad; Insula Canonicorum; Elanagranoch; Elaunaganaghe; Island of Saints	52°40′45″N 9°02′14″W
Ceannindis Monastery ^{~}		early monastic site, founded 6th century by St Comgan of Killeshin; possibly located in County Clare	Cenn-indis; Cenn-innis	
Clare Abbey, Clarecastle (Irish: Mainistir Chliara)		Augustinian Canons Regular founded before 1189 or 1191 by Donald O'Brien, King of Limerick; dissolved c.1543; granted to Henry, Earl of Thomond 1661; (NM)	The Abbey Church of Saint Peter and Saint Paul, Clareabbey ____________________; Clareabbey; Clar; Clair; Clayr; Cleara; de Forgio; Forgy	52°49′44″N 8°58′09″W
Corcomroe Abbey (Irish: Mainistir Chorca Mrua)		suggested early monastic site, Irish monks founded 1175?; Cistercian monks from Inish-lounaght; founded 1194/5, endowed by Donald O'Brien, King of Limerick; dissolved after 1600; granted to Richard Harding (date unknown); (NM)	The Abbey Church of Saint Mary of the Fertile Rock, Corcomroe ____________________; Corcomruad; Corcamer; Corcumro; Petra Fertili; Sancta Maria de Petra Fertili	53°07′36″N 9°03′14″W
Drim Friary (Irish: Mainistir an Droma)		Franciscan Friars — place of refuge; founded c.1740, expelled from Quin; dissolved 1820 (death of last friar)		
Drumcliff Monastery (Irish: Mainistir Dhrom Chléibh)		Gaelic monks founded 6th century reputedly by St Colmcille		52°52′04″N 8°59′51″W
Dysert O Dea Monastery (Irish: Díseart Uí Dheá)		Gaelic monks founded before 735 by Tola; remains of 12th-century church on site	Dissert O'Dea; Disert O'Dea; Dysart O'Dea; Disert-Tola	52°54′33″N 9°04′06″W
Ennis Friary * (Irish: Mainistir na hInse)		Franciscan Friars Minor, Conventual founded 1240-7 (before 1242? or c.1284) by Donchad Cairbreach O'Brien (Donatus Carbrac O'Brien), King of Thomond; Observant Franciscan Friars reformed 1536-40 (1550); dissolved; granted to the Earl of Thomond 1578; granted to William Dongan Esq.; dissolved on the death of the last friar 1617; friars returned 1628; expelled 1651; friars returned c.1660; expelled 1693; in use as C.I. parish church 1615; Franciscan Friars founded 1841; acquired 1854; Provincial Novitiate House 1877; Novitiate House of the Irish Province 1902; extant	Nave: St Francis ____________________; Innse-an-laoigh; Inis-an-laoigh; Ennis-an-laoigh; Inis-cluan-ruada; Iniscluanramhfada	52°50′46″N 8°58′54″W
Ennis Nunnery ^{ø}		supposed nuns — erroneous interpretation (Note: Ennis nuns — Wars of Turlogh, (E. B. Fitzmaurice & A. G. Little, Materials for History of the Franciscan Province of Ireland pp.80-1) taken to refer to nuns; communications of Canice Mooney, OFM, point out that the word used,'caileach', translates as 'chalice', as opposed to 'cailleach' (nun))		
Ennis Monastery * (Irish: Mainistir Inis Caorach)		Poor Clares		52°50′41″N 8°58′45″W
Enniskerry Monastery		early monastic site, oratory built by St Senan of Scattery	Mutton Island; Inis-caorach	52°48′47″N 9°30′45″W
Ennistimon Monastery (Irish: Mainistir Inis Díomáin)		Pre-existing parish church/chapel at the site, built after 1812. Monastery and school founded in 1824 by the Congregation of Christian Brothers. Residence at the site completed by May 1827. Later buildings include a primary school (1931) and nearby secondary school(1970).	Ennistymon; Omos-timain; Inis-tomen; Inis-diomain	52°56′16″N 9°18′05″W
Feenish Monastery ^{~}		Gaelic nuns founded (in the time of St Senan of Scattery) by St Brigid, daughter of Conchraid of the Mactail family?	Inis-fidhe; Fidh-inis; Cluain-fidhe; Finish (Irish: Mainistir Fhínse)	52°42′21″N 8°58′20″W (approx)
Glencolumbkille Abbey (Irish: Mainistir Ghleann Cholm Cille)		Columban monks founded by St Columcille; CI Church on site	Glan Columb-chille; Glann-columcille; Glenn-choluimchille; Glenn-coluimbcille	53°02′23″N 9°00′57″W
Illaunmore Monastery (Irish: Mainistir an Oileáin Mhóir)		Gaelic monks founded 7th/8th century; possibly not surviving after the 10th century (historically located in County Galway)	Oilenmor; Mucinis Monastery? (v. infra)	52°58′03″N 8°17′28″W
Illaunmore, ^{ø} Lough Derg		possible monastic site — order and period unknown		52°35′57″N 9°46′21″W
Inchicronan Priory (Irish: Prióireacht Inse Chrónáin)		early monastic site, possibly founded 6th century by patron, St Cronan of Tuamgraney; (Note: Inchicronan "ruins of...Augustinian priory...on a site whose history goes back to St Crónán of Tuamgraney" — Lord Killanin & M. V. Duignan, Shell Guide to Ireland, 1962, (new edition 1967), p.184 (p.124 in 1989 edition)); Augustinian Canons Regular — from Clareabbey dependent on Clare; founded c.1198? by Donald O'Brien, King of Limerick, who granted the island to Clare; parish church 1302, built on the site of an earlier monastery; dissolved c.1543; restored and in use by 'friars' in the reign of Elizabeth; church restored for parochial use 1615 by Donogh, Earl of Thomond; granted to Henry, Earl of Thomond 1661; (NM)	Conventual Priory of St Mary, Ynyscronan (1421); ____________________; Inchycronayne; Inis-cronain; Inchycronayn	52°55′05″N 8°54′23″W
Inishcealtra Monastery, Inishcealtra (Holy Island)		early monastic site, founded 653 by St Camin, buried here; suggested Augustinian Canons Regular — evidence lacking	Iniskeltair Abbey; Iniscealtra; Inis Cealtra; Inishcaltra; Iniscaltra; Inis-celtra; Inis-keltair	52°54′56″N 8°26′54″W
Inisanlaoi Monastery (Irish: Prióireacht Inis an Lao)	monastic site, unknown order and foundation, actually Ennis Franciscan Friary (supra) (Note: Inislanlaoi — listed as a separate foundation at Ennis by Mervyn Archdall, Monasticon Hibernicum, 1786, p.77)		Inis-anlaoige	
Inishloe Abbey (Irish: Mainistir Inis Lua)		Gaelic monks founded by Turlogh, King of Thomond, buried here; on an island in the Shannon Estuary between Scattery and Limerick (Note: Inishloe (Inislua) — location given by Mervyn Archdall Monasticon Hibernicum, 1786)	Inis-luaidh; Inis-lua	52°40′42″N 9°00′59″W
Inish-loinge		nuns, founded 6th century (in the time of St Senan), (Note: Inish-loinge — "penitentiarius de Inis-Lauidhe" — Acta Sanctorum ... Hiberniae, compiled by John Colgan, 1645, pp.537, 540) sited between Scattery and Limerick	Inis-luinge; Inishloinge	
Inishmore Monastery (Irish: Mainistir Inis Mór)		tradition of early monastic site, founded 6th century by St Senan on Deer Island, but Canon Island possibly the site of this foundation of Senan's	Inchmore; Deer Island?	52°42′50″N 9°02′08″W (approx possible site)
Inis-tuaischert (Irish: Inis Tuaiscirt)		early monastic site, founded 6th century by St Senan, possibly County Clare, possibly a small island in the Fergus Estuary		
Kilballyowen Monastery (Irish: Mainistir Chill Bhaile Eoghain)		monastic site, unknown foundation and order church built to the south of the site, now in ruins in a cemetery		52°35′52″N 9°47′11″W
Kilcarragh Monastery (Irish: Mainistir Chill Chathrach)		hospital or monastery; granted to John King		52°59′14″N 9°13′29″W
Kilfarboy Monastery ^{ø~} (Irish: Cill Fear Buí)		early monastic site, also given as Kilfobrick, County Meath (Note: Kilfarboy — given as Kilfobrick — Mervyn Archdall, Monasticon Hibernicum, 1786, p.52)	Cell-fobric; Kilfobrick	
Kilfenora Monastery ^{+} (Irish: Cill Fhionnúrach)		Celtic monks, purportedly founded by St Fachnan (possibly Fachtnan, founder of Ross Carbery) probably continuing after 1111; episcopal diocesan cathedral probably by 1152; extant	Fenabore; Cell-fionnabrach; Cell-findabrach; Cell-umabrach; Fynabore	52°54′56″N 9°12′55″W
Killadusert Monastery (Irish: Cill an Dísirt)		Gaelic monks founder unknown	Killadysert; Disert-murthaile; Kildysert	52°40′12″N 9°06′16″W?
Killaloe Monastery (Irish: Mainistir Chill Lua)		Gaelic monks founded 10th century; episcopal diocesan cathedral 1111 monastery probably continuing after 1111 and throughout the 12th century, though evidence lacking; church becoming CI cathedral 1546	Laonia; Cell-da-lua; Kildalua	52°48′23″N 8°26′21″W
Killinaboy Monastery (Irish: Cill Iníne Baoith)		early monastic site, founded by Iníon Bhaoith		52°58′13″N 9°05′08″W
Killone Abbey (Irish: Mainistir Chill Eoin)		Augustinian Nuns founded c.1189 (or monks founded 1120) by Donald O'Brien, King of Limerick on site owned by Clare Abbey; dissolved before 1584; ruinous by 1617; now in the grounds of Newhall House, with public access	The Abbey Church of Saint John the Baptist, Killone ____________________; Killoen; St John de Thomon	52°48′22″N 9°00′16″W
Kilnagallech Monastery ^{~} (Irish: Cill na gCailleach		Gaelic nuns probable cell	Kinagalliagh; Kilnagellech; Cell-eochaille; Cell-na-Caillech; Kill-nac-caillech	52°38′53″N 9°33′54″W (approx)
Kilshanny Abbey (Irish: Mainistir Chill Seanaigh		Augustinian Canons Regular founded c.1194 by Donal Mor O'Brien, King of Thomond; dissolved before 1581?; granted to Robert Hickman	probably St Mary and St Augustine ____________________; Kilshonny; Cell-seanaig; Kil-feanye; Kil-teanna; Kyllsenayd	52°58′38″N 9°17′15″W
Mucinis Monastery ^{~} (Irish: Mainistir Mhuicinse)		early monastic site, plundered by Norsemen 922; possibly County Clare, either at Hog Island or Lough Derg	Muicinis Riagail; Muck-inis; Hog Island; Pig Island possibly Illaunmore (v. supra)	52°37′13″N 9°29′58″W (approx) or 52°55′10″N 8°25′22″W (approx)
Noughaval Monastery (Irish: Mainistir Nuachabhála)		Gaelic monks founded by St Mogua	Nuachongbhail	53°00′57″N 9°10′49″W
Oughtmama Monastery (Irish: Mainistir Ucht Máma)		early monastic site, associated with three saints named St. Colmán, one from Ceinéal Laoghaire of Meath, one from Eoghanachta of Munster, and one from Uí Bhriúin of Connacht	Ucht Máma	53°7′0.7″N 9°2′19.65″W
Quin Abbey (Irish: Mainistir Chuinche)		Franciscan Friars Minor, Conventual founded 1402; Observant Franciscan Friars reformed 1433 by Macon MacNamara; dissolved 1541, though friars remained in occupation; granted to Conor O'Brien, Baron Ibracken 1543; confirmed to the Earls of Thomond 1577; granted to Sir Tirlagh O'Brien, of Irishdyman 1583; burnt 1584; repaired and refounded by Roman Catholics 1604; friars expelled 1617; returned c.1626; friars expelled 1637; (NM)	Quin Friary; Quinchy	52°49′04″N 8°51′31″W
Rath Monastery ^{#} (Irish: Mainistir na Rátha)		Gaelic monks founded by St Blathmac; stump of round tower demolished 1838	Rathblathmaic	52°55′03″N 9°05′08″W
Rossmanagher Monastery (Irish: Mainistir Ros mBeannchair)		Gaelic nuns	Ros-bendchuir; Ross-Bennchoir	52°43′14″N 8°47′09″W
Scattery Island Monastery (Irish: Mainistir Inis Caorach)		Celtic monks founded 6th century by St Senan (or by St Patrick); granted to the Mayor and Corporation of Limerick c.1577	Inishscattery	52°36′51″N 9°31′01″W
Tomfinlough Monastery (Irish: Mainistir Thuaim Fhionnlocha)		Gaelic monks; probably not continuing after the 10th century; site now occupied by remains of Tomfinlough church	Finlough	52°46′59″N 8°50′22″W
Tomgraney Abbey (Irish: Mainistir Thuaim Gréine)		Gaelic monks	Tomgrany; Tuamgranney; Tuamgraney	52°53′51″N 8°32′31″W
Tulla Abbey (Irish: Mainistir na Tulaí)		Gaelic monks		52°52′01″N 8°45′24″W

== Map link to lists of monastic houses in Ireland by county ==
Click on a county to go to the corresponding article.	Antrim; Armagh; Down; Fermanagh; Londonderry; Tyrone; Carlow; Cavan; Clare; Cork; Donegal; Dublin; Galway; Kerry; Kildare; Kilkenny; Laois; Leitrim; Limerick; Longford; Louth; Mayo; Meath; Monaghan; Offaly; Roscommon; Sligo; Tipperary; Waterford; Westmeath; Wexford; Wicklow

== See also ==
- List of monastic houses in Ireland
