= List of monastic houses in County Limerick =

The smaller establishments such as monastic cells and notable monastic granges (particularly those with resident monks) and camerae of the military orders of monks (Knights Templars and Knights Hospitallers) are included. The numerous monastic hospitals per se are not included here unless at some time the foundation had, or was purported to have, the status or function of an abbey, priory, or preceptory/commandery.

== Layout ==
Communities/provenance: shows the status and communities existing at each establishment, together with such dates as have been established as well as the fate of the establishment after dissolution, and the current status of the site.

Formal name or dedication: shows the formal name of the establishment or the person in whose name the church is dedicated, where known.

Alternative names: some of the establishments have had alternative names over the course of time. In order to assist in text-searching such alternatives in name or spelling have been provided.

== Abbreviations and key ==
The sites listed are ruins or fragmentary remains unless indicated thus:
| * | current monastic function |
| + | current non-monastic ecclesiastic function |
| ^ | current non-ecclesiastic function |
| = | remains incorporated into later structure |
| # | no identifiable trace of the monastic foundation remains |
| ~ | exact site of monastic foundation unknown |
| ø | possibly no such monastic foundation at location |
| ¤ | no such monastic foundation |
| ≈ | identification ambiguous or confused |

Locations with names in italics indicate probable duplication (misidentification with another location) or non-existent foundations (either erroneous reference or proposed foundation never implemented).

Trusteeship denoted as follows:
| NIEA | Scheduled Monument (NI) |
| NM | National Monument (ROI) |
| C.I. | Church of Ireland |
| R.C. | Roman Catholic Church |

| Foundation | Image | Communities & provenance | Formal name or dedication & alternative names | References & location |
|---|---|---|---|---|
| Abbeyfeale Abbey | | Cistercian monks founded 1188 by Brian O'Brien; dissolved c.1209; cell dependent on Monasteranenagh c.1209; dissolved c.1350?; probably residential grange leased to laymen; possibly obtained by Carmelite Friars (v. Felense in Munster, infra) | Feale; Monaster-na-Feile; Felense? | 52°23′09″N 9°18′03″W |
| Abington Abbey | | Cistercian monks — from Arklow (community founded at Wyresdale, Lancashire c.1196 from Furness, transferred to Arklow before 1204) transferred here 1205, land granted by Theobald Walter, Butler of Ireland; dissolved 1540; secular 1540; restored — recolonized from Furness/Savigny; granted to Walter Aphoell by Edward VI, confirmed by Queen Mary 1553; dissolved after 1557; lease passed to Piers (Peter) Walshe 1562 | St Mary ____________________; Mainister-uaithne; Owney; Unquchin; Vetinex; Vogney; Woney; Wotheney; Huena | 52°37′59″N 8°25′20″W |
| Adare Friary ^{+} | | Augustinian Friars founded before 1316 by John Fitz Thomas Fitzgerald; Observant Augustinian Friars 1472; dissolved 1539-40; friars probably still in occupation until 1559; dissolved c.1581?; leased to John Gold and others before 1583; granted to Sir Henry Wallop 1595; conventual church now in use as C.I. parish church | Black Abbey | 52°34′04″N 8°47′05″W |
| Adare Franciscan Friary | | Franciscan Friars Minor, Conventual founded 1464 by Thomas Fitz Gerald, Earl of Kildare and his wife Johanna; Observant Franciscan Friars reformed 1466; dissolved 1539-40; apparently unoccupied by 1559; restored by 1579; expelled c.1581 during the Desmond war; granted to Sir Henry Wallop 1595; (re-established at a new location in Adare 1633) now in the grounds of Adare Manor, within a golf course, with public access | The church of Saint Michael Archangel of the Friars Minor ____________________; Athdara; Atdare | 52°34′09″N 8°46′35″W |
| Adare Trinitarian Monastery | | Trinitarian Friars founded c.1230 (before 1226?); dissolved after 1539? (officially February 1539); granted to Sir Henry Wallop 1595; ruinous church repaired by the Earl of Dunraven 1811; in use as R.C. church | St James; The Holy Trinity ____________________; White Abbey | 52°33′54″N 8°47′20″W |
| Adare Dominican Friary ^{≈} | Dominican Friars — erroneous reference to Trinitarian Friary (Note: "Adare Dominican" — The Earl and Countess of Dunraven, Memorials of Adare, 1865, pp.35-6) | | | |
| Adare Preceptory | | Knights Hospitaller (listed c.1658 (Note: "Adare Hospitallers" — White's List, M. Lenihan, Limerick, its History and Antiquities, 1866, p.562; Registrum Kilmainham, edited by J. T. Gilbert (Rolls Ser.), 1889, pp.140,155)) | | |
| Any Friary | | purported Augustinian Friars (Note: "Any" — Ware-Harris, History of the Bishops of Ireland, 1739, p.202, probably from Pipe Roll, 17 May year 1, to 21 December year 2, Edw.III) founded during the reign of Edward II, by John, son of Robert and others; | Knockainy; Ballynamona? | 52°29′51″N 8°27′19″W |
| Ardaneer Priory | | Benedictine monks founded c.1202, land and church granted by William de Burgo to Richard, monk of Glastonbury; dependent on Glastonbury; dissolved 1205? | St Mary ____________________ ?Ardimur; Ardinuir; Oculnid | |
| Ardpatrick Monastery | | early monastic site, purportedly founded 5th century by St Patrick; monastic lands recorded as late as 1597 | Ardpatricke; Ard-Padraig | 52°20′18″N 8°31′52″W |
| Askeaton Friary | | Franciscan Friars Minor, Conventual founded 1389?, (Note: Askeaton, 1389 founding — Wadding, who identified Askeaton with Luasia, though Canice Mooney, OFM, communications, notes that this is Latin for Laois) or before 1400 (Note: Askeaton, founding before 1400 — Canice Mooney, OFM, communications, identified convent of Inysgebryny, in existence 1400, with Askeaton)) by Gearóid Iarla (Gerald), 4th Earl of Desmond, (Note: Askeaton founder — cf. E. B. Fitzmaurice and A. G. Little, Materials for History of the Franciscan Province of Ireland, 1920, pp.170,180-1) or 1420 by James Fitzgerald, Earl of Desmond; (Note: Askeaton, 1420 founding — James Ware); Observant Franciscan Friars reformed 1497; reformed 1513; dissolved 1575; (NM) | Athskettin; Easa-geibhteine; Es-geibhteine; Inis-geibhthine; Easa-gebryny | 52°36′14″N 8°58′31″W |
| Askeaton Commandery | | Knights Templar (Note: Askeaton Commandery — legendary attribution to Templars — T. J. Westropp, Journal, Royal Society of Antiquities in Ireland, xxiv, p.111) founded 1298, attached to the parochial church, (Note: S. Lewis, Topographical Dictionary of Ireland, 1837, i, p.81) now the C.I. parish church of St Mary | | 52°36′02″N 8°58′14″W |
| Ballinegaul Friary | | early monastic site Dominican Friars founded 1296, rebuilt by the Geraldines; dependent on Kilmallock; granted to Richard Lawless 1551-2; dissolved before 1586, ruinous by 1586; listed as Carmelite 1597 (see immediately below) | Monaster-na-ngall; Burgus Anglorum; Braber duff (Black friars); Ballinegall | 52°19′55″N 8°28′04″W (approx) |
| Ballinegaul White Friary | | Carmelite Friars former Dominican house (see immediately above) listed as White Friars 1597 | Monaster-na-ngall; Burgus Anglorum | 52°19′55″N 8°28′04″W (approx) |
| Ballingarry Abbey | | 'abbey', (Note: 'Ballingarry Abbey' — Memorial Atlas of Ireland, 1901, given as 'church' on 6-inch Ordnance Survey) unknown order and foundation Franciscan Friars? | | 52°28′37″N 8°51′24″W |
| Ballingarry Nunnery ^{~} | | supposed nuns — order and foundation unknown | dedication unknown | |
| Ballintubber Monastery ^{≈} | | purported Carmelite Friars or Knights Templar granted to Robert Browne possible reference to Rochestown Dominican Friary | | |
| Ballybrood Friary | | Franciscan Friars — possible refuge 17th century; purportedly all slaughtered by Oliver Cromwell | | |
| Ballycahane Preceptory? | | Knights Templar church confirmed to the Knights Hospitaller 1212 — no record of preceptory | Cathan | |
| Ballynagallagh Priory | | Augustinian nuns convent founded 1283 by a FitzGibbon; land here in possession of Llanthony Priory 1360; dissolved before 1548; granted to Edmund Sexton c.1548; some confusion with St Catherine de O'Conyl; | Monaster-nagalliaghduff; Monaster-necallowduffe; Monaster-nicalliagh | 52°31′12″N 8°32′30″W (approx) |
| Ballyorgan Friary ^{¤≈} | Trinitarian — erroneous reference to Ballinegaul Dominican Friary, supra | | Baile-aragain | |
| Ballyorgan Friary | | early monastic site, purportedly founded 6th century by St Finnian | Baile-aragain | 52°18′41″N 8°27′58″W |
| Bruree Preceptory? | | Knights Templar castle purportedly built 12th century by the order; no record of a preceptory | Brugh-righ | |
| Carrigogunnell Preceptory? | | Knights Templar (Note: Mervyn Archdall, Monasticon Hibernicum, 1786, p.419 (citing MSS Smith)) | Carraic-O-gCoinneal | |
| Castleconnell Friary? | | unknown order purported Augustinian Friars founded c.1300; (Note: Lubin: Louis Augustin Alemand, Monasticon Hibernicum, translated and edited by John Stevens, 1722, pp.310,312) "remains of a monastery" (Note: Cassells Gazetteer of Britain and Ireland, i, p.446) | Caislen-ui-chonaing; Castle-Connell in Munster | 52°42′55″N 8°30′11″W (approx) |
| Castletown-mac-eneiry Monastery | | remains of a purported large monastery, (Note: Mervyn Archdall, Monasticon Hibernicum, 1786, Castletown Masaniry:) doubtful | Roque (Castletown, Corcomohide parish) | |
| Clarina Monastery | | Autustinian Canons Regular nuns | Cluain-Credhil; (Note: M. Lenihan, Limerick, its History and Antiquities, 1866, p.31); Killeedy? | |
| Cloch-na-monach Abbey | | Cistercian monks supposed abbey remains; (Note: Rev. Patrick Fitzgerald and John James M'Gregor, History, Topography and Antiquities of the county and city of Limerick, 1826, Vol 1, p.299 & Mervyn Archdall, Monasticon Hibernicum, p.433) grange of Monasteranenagh | Cloghnamanagh | |
| Cloncagh Monastery | | early monastic site, founded before 625 by St Maedoc of Ferns | | |
| Clonkeen Monastery | | early monastic site, founded 6th/7th century by St Mo-Diomog (Note: Clonkeen — Lord Killanin & M. V. Duignan, Shell Guide to Ireland, 1962, (new edition 1967), p.352) | | 52°38′38″N 8°27′35″W |
| Doon Monastery | | early monastic site, founded 6th century (in existence in the time of St Colmcille) | Dunbleschiae | 52°36′16″N 8°14′38″W |
| Dysert Monastery, Carrigeen | | early monastic site, founded by a St Oengus (purportedly the Culdee) | Disert-aengusa | 52°31′15″N 8°44′41″W |
| Felense Friary ^{~≈?} | | Carmelite Friars possibly located in County Limerick, possibly former site of Abbeyfeale Cistercians, supra, otherwise county and location unknown | Felense in Munster; Abbeyfeale? | |
| Friarstown Friary | | Franciscan Friars, Third Order Regular founded after 1450? (or 13th century by the Clan-Gibbons); dissolved 1544; possibly vacant by 1450; held in rebellion by Gerald Baluff f. Philip until after 1590? | St Francis de Ballynebrahrair ____________________; Ballynabrahrair; Baile-ne-braher; Bally-ne-braher; Clochnamanach Abbey | 52°35′36″N 8°36′37″W |
| Galbally Friary | village location — friary located across the county border: see Moor Abbey, List of monastic houses in County Tipperary | | | |
| Glenstal Abbey * | | Benedictine monks; extant; mansion in monastic use, also serving as a school | | 52°39′42″N 8°23′17″W |
| Hospital Preceptory | | Knights Hospitaller founded before 1215 (during the reign of King John) by Geoffrey de Mariscis, the Knights being granted royal privileges 1215; dissolved before 1540; farmed out by Pr Rawson; granted to Sir Valentine Browne by Queen Elizabeth; Kenmare Castle built on site by Browne; leased before 1603; granted to Thomas Brown (ancestor of the Earls of Kenmare) 1604 | The Preceptory of Saint John the Baptist, Any ____________________; Ane; Any; Hospital of Any; Anye | 52°28′34″N 8°25′57″W |
| Hyde Ita Nunnery? | | Augustinian Canons Regular nuns, (Note: given by M. Lenihan, Limerick, Its History and Antiquities, 1866, p.31) apparently Cell Ita (v. Killedy) | Hydh Ita; (probably Cell Ita, properly Killeedy)? | |
| Kellis Priory | properly Kells, County Kilkenny (Note: Mervyn Archdall, Monasticon Hibernicum, 1786, p.810) | | | |
| Killeedy Monastery | | early monastic site, monks and nuns founded c.546 by St Ita; possibly not continuing after the 10th century | Cell-ite; Cluain-chredail; Killita | 52°22′55″N 9°04′16″W |
| Kilmacanearla Abbey, Ballingarry parish | | "Abbey (in ruins)" (Note: Ordance Survey (6in) and Memorial Atlas of Ireland, 1901) | | 52°28′37″N 8°51′24″W |
| Kilmallock Abbey | | Dominican Friars founded 1291, land purchased from John Bluet, burgess, with the consent of Edward I; dissolved 1541; leased to James FitzJohn, Earl of Desmond 1548; passed to the Crown and the commonality of Kilmallock 1569-70; friars probably expelled 1571 when the town was sacked; granted to Nicholas Miagh, sovereign of Kilmallock, and to the brethren and community 1594; (NM) | Flacispaghe | 52°24′09″N 8°34′30″W |
| Kilmallock Monastery | | early monastic site, founded early half of the 7th century by St Mochelloch; plundered 1015 | Cell-mochelloc; Cell-dacheallog; Killochy | 52°24′33″N 8°34′57″W |
| Kilmallock Monastery | | purported Augustinian Canons Regular (Note: White's list c.1658) | | |
| Kilmallock Monastery | | purported Augustinian Friars, (Note: Augustin Lubin, Orbis Augustinianus, as given by Louis Augustin Alemand, Monasticum Hibernicum, translated and edited by J. Stevens, 1722, pp.309, 312, 324) in which case founded after 1630 | | |
| Kilpeacon Monastery | | early monastic site, founded before 690 by St Becan (Mo-Becoc) | Cluain-ard-Mobecoc | 52°34′56″N 8°37′54″W (approx) |
| Kilrath Monastery | | early monastic site, County Limerick? (Note: Tripartite Life of St. Patrick, edited by W. Stokes, (Rolls Ser.), 1887, pp.200, 350) | Cella Rath | |
| Kilsane Nunnery ^{≈¤} | nuns, (misreading of source) (Note: Louis Augustin Alemand, Monasticum Hibernicum, translated and edited by John Stevens, 1722, p.353, misreading of James Ware, De Hibernia et Antiquitatibus ejus, 1654 edition, p.203) | | properly St Catherine de O'Conyl, infra | |
| Kilshane Abbey | | Cistercian monks — from Corcomroe (County Clare) (Note: Rev. Patrick Fitzgerald and John James M'Gregor, The History, Topography and Antiquities of the County and City of Limerick, 1827, Vol 2, p.380) daughter of Corcomroe; founded 1198 by Donnchad Cairbreach O'Brien, King of Limerick; dissolved c.1200, united to Monasteranenagh | Cell-scanaig; Kil-son; Kil-sonna; Ballingarry; Garra | |
| Kilshane Friary | | Franciscan Friars Minor, Conventual founded before 1426? by Fitzgerald, Lord of Clenlis (Note: Rev. Patrick Fitzgerald and John James M'Gregor, The History, Topography and Antiquities of the County and City of Limerick, 1827, Vol 2, p.380) dissolved after 1584 | Cell-scanaig; Kil-son; Kil-sonna; Ballingarry; Garra | |
| Kilteely Monastery | | early monastic site, founded 6th century by St Patrick | Cell-tidil; Kilteidhill | |
| Kilteely Commandery | | Knights Templar chapel, (Note: Mervyn Archdall, Monasticon Hibernicum, 1786, p.425) purported commandery (Note: Cassells, iv, p.1) founded 1291 (Note: Samuel Lewis, A Topographical Dictionary of Limerick County and City, 1837, p.288) | Kildromin Church | 52°31′10″N 8°24′08″W |
| King's Island | Franciscan Friars, (misreading of source) (Note: Mervyn Archdall, Monasticon Hibernicum, 1786, p.430, misreading Wadding) | | Island near Limerick (Note: Louis Augustin Alemand, Monasticum Hibernicum, translated and edited by John Stevens, 1722) properly Limerick Franciscan Friars, infra | |
| Knockainy Monastery ^{ø~} | | purported early monastic site — dubious (Note: Cassells, Gazetteer of Great Britain and Ireland, iv, p.55) unknown order, period or foundation | Cnoc-aine;; Aine-cliath; cf Any; Hospital of Any | |
| Kynnethin Monastery ^{ø≈} | | purported Augustinian Canons Regular — possible reference to Keynsham, Somerset, England, which had property in County Limerick | Kynnythin | |
| Lehense Monastery ^{≈} | | Carmelite Friars — possible duplication of reference to Barvegalense (Milltown) | possibly Barvegalense (Milltown) | |
| Limerick Crutched Friars Priory Hospital | | Crutched Friars founded before 1216 (during the reign of King John) by Simon Minor; dissolved 1537; passed to Augustinian Friars 1632 (see immediately below) | St Mary and St Edmund, King, and the Holy Cross | 52°40′02″N 8°37′10″W |
| Limerick Monastery of the Holy Cross | | Augustinian Friars founded 1632, previously Crutched Friars (see immediately above) | St Mary and St Edward | 52°40′02″N 8°37′10″W |
| Limerick Blackfriars | | Dominican Friars founded 1227 by Donogh Carbreach O'Brien, King of Thomond, buried here; (Edward I claimed his own ancestors were the founders); Dominican Friars, Regular Observant reformed 1504; dissolved 1543; granted to James, Earl of Desmond, who restored the friars; forfeited to the Crown 1569-72; granted to Robert Ansley 1589; held by James Gould until his death 1600; (subsequent history O'Heyne, Burgo and Coleman) | St Saviour | |
| Limerick Franciscan Friars | | Franciscan Friars Minor, Conventual founded 1267 (during the reign of Henry III) by the de Burgo family (Note: James Ware, De Hibernia et Antiquitatibus ejus, 1654 edition) (Thomas de Burgo (Note: Coll. de Rebust Hibernicis, BM. Additional manuscripts 4814, Sloane, f.5; Rev. Canice Mooney, OFM, Terminus, 1954, p.128) or William de Burgo (Note: Tomas de Burgo, Hibernica Dominicana, 1762 edition, p.754)); Observant Franciscan Friars reformed 1534; dissolved 1534; granted to Edmund Sexton; restored 1540-8; friars expelled by the Protestants 1548; ruinous, owned by Stephen Sexton prior to his death in 1595; abandoned until 1615 | | |
| Limerick Priory | | Augustinian nuns founded 1171? by Donal O'Brien, King of Limerick; dependent on Killone c.1189; dissolved 1541; farmed out by Edmund Sexton 1548 | St Peter ____________________ probably Monaster ne Callow Duffe (Black Abbey) | |
| Limerick Monaster ne Callow Duffe ^{ø~} | | nuns — (probable misinterpretation) | probably Limerick Priory | |
| Limerick Preceptory? ^{ø} | | Knights Templar or Knights Hospitaller probable Frank House | Luimneach; Lumniac; Limbricen | |
| Lough Gur, ^{ø} near Loghgir | | purported Franciscan Friars | probably Friarstown (Ballynabrahrair) | |
| Luddenbeg Monastery ^{ø} | | purported monastery (Note: Rev. Patrick Fitzgerald and John James M'Gregor, History, Topography and Antiquities of the county and city of Limerick, 1826, Vol 1, pp.288-9, mentions ruins of abbey of Luden — (Louis Augustin Alemand, Monasticum Hibernicum, translated and edited by John Stephens, 1722, p.361); Luden is actually Louth Park, Lincolnshire) — remains appear to be a parochial church | | |
| Milltown Friary | | Carmelite Friars founded 1459-60, land granted to Carmelites Donald Ygormellay and William de Burgo by James Deles, donsel of Emly Diocese, and Kennedy Macbriayn and his brother Torieleus, to build a monastery; dissolved before 1544; restored also mistakenly given as Carthusian (Note: Thomas Dineley (in the time of Charles II), Journal, Royal Society of Antiquaries of Ireland, viii, p.270) | Ballinegall; Barvegalense; Ballywullan; Villa Mollendini; Molingar | 52°31′57″N 8°24′10″W |
| Monasteranenagh Abbey | | Cistercian monks — from Mellifont founded 1148 (1148/51) by Turlough O'Brien, King of Thomond, confirmed by King John; dissolved 1540; granted to Sir Osborne Echingham 1543; monks apparently continued to occupy until 1579; captured by the English 3 April 1580, during the Desmond rebellion and the monks massacred; (NM) | Monaster-an-Aonagh; Eanach; Monaster-na-maighe; Maigue; Maio; Manister; Nenagh; Nenay | 52°31′01″N 8°39′46″W |
| St. Katherine's Abbey, Monisternagalliaghduff, nr. Shanagolden | | Augustinian nuns founded 1298; dissolved 1541 | | |
| Mungret Abbey | | early monastic site, founded before 551 by St Nessan the Deacon; plundered on several occasions 9th-12th century; possible Augustinian Canons Regular for a time, 12th century — documentary evidence lacking; claimed episcopal status 1152 — deemed too close to the see at Limerick to substantiate the claim; (NM) | Mungairit; Moungairid | 52°38′03″N 8°40′32″W |
| Newcastle Camera ^{ø} | | Knights Templar (Note: White's List ()compiled c.1658 — M. Lenihan, Limerick, its History and its Antiquities, 1866, pp.564, 736) founded 1184, castle of the earls of Desmond built by the Templars, who were stationed here; dissolved before 1308? | Caislen-nua | 52°27′02″N 9°03′38″W |
| Old Kildimo Monastery ^{~} | | early monastic site, purportedly founded prior to arrival of St Patrick in Munster, (Note: O' Halloran) by Dimma | Cell-diomma; Kildimma | |
| Old Kildimo Preceptory | | Knights Templar (Note: Cassells, Gazetteer of Great Britain and Ireland, Vol. 3, p.341); Court Castle founded by the Templars | | 52°36′43″N 8°48′28″W (approx) |
| Rathkeale Priory | | Augustinian Canons Regular — Arroasian — possibly from Rattoo purportedly founded c.1210? by Gilbert Harvey; dissolved 1542; restored, small community possibly in occupation until the Desmond rebellion, c.1581; granted to Sir Henry Wallop c.1594-5 | The Abbey Church of Saint Mary, Rathkeale ____________________; Rathkeale Abbey; Ragelli; Ragille; Ragkely; Rakil; Rathgial | 52°31′25″N 8°55′57″W |
| Rathkeale Friary ^{ø} | Franciscan Friars (Note: Rev. Canice Mooney, OFM, Terminus, 1956) — no such establishment here | | | |
| Rochestown Friary | | Dominican Friars founded ?; dependent on Limerick?; dissolved c.1544; granted to Robert Browne | Friarstown Friary, Rocheston; Rocheston; Ballyniwillin; Ballywilliam; Bailenambratharbeg; Mainistirnambratharbeg | 52°32′32″N 8°32′08″W |
| St. Katherine's Abbey, Monisternagalliaghduff, near Shanagolden | | Augustinian nuns founded before 1261; dissolved before 1567; granted to Sir Warham St Leger 1567; sometime owned by Sir John Desmond leased to James Gold 1583; granted to Sir Hugh Wallop 1594 | St Catherine ____________________; St Catherine de O'Conyl Priory; Monasternecallow-duffe; Monasternagalliaghduff; Ballanegillagh | 52°34′18″N 9°03′46″W |

== Map link to lists of monastic houses in Ireland by county ==
| Click on a county to go to the corresponding article. | Antrim; Armagh; Down; Fermanagh; Londonderry; Tyrone; Carlow; Cavan; Clare; Cork; Donegal; Dublin; Galway; Kerry; Kildare; Kilkenny; Laois; Leitrim; Limerick; Longford; Louth; Mayo; Meath; Monaghan; Offaly; Roscommon; Sligo; Tipperary; Waterford; Westmeath; Wexford; Wicklow |

== See also ==
- List of monastic houses in Ireland
