= List of monastic houses in County Donegal =

The smaller establishments such as monastic cells and notable monastic granges (particularly those with resident monks) and camerae of the military orders of monks (Knights Templars and Knights Hospitallers) are included. The numerous monastic hospitals per se are not included here unless at some time the foundation had, or was purported to have, the status or function of an abbey, priory, or preceptory/commandery.

== Layout ==
Communities/provenance: shows the status and communities existing at each establishment, together with such dates as have been established as well as the fate of the establishment after dissolution, and the current status of the site.

Formal name or dedication: shows the formal name of the establishment or the person in whose name the church is dedicated, where known.

Alternative names: some of the establishments have had alternative names over the course of time. In order to assist in text-searching such alternatives in name or spelling have been provided.

== Abbreviations and key ==
The sites listed are ruins or fragmentary remains unless indicated thus:
*	current monastic function
+	current non-monastic ecclesiastic function
^	current non-ecclesiastic function
=	remains incorporated into later structure
#	no identifiable trace of the monastic foundation remains
~	exact site of monastic foundation unknown
ø	possibly no such monastic foundation at location
¤	no such monastic foundation
≈	identification ambiguous or confused

Locations with names in italics indicate probable duplication (misidentification with another location) or non-existent foundations (either erroneous reference or proposed foundation never implemented).

Trusteeship denoted as follows:
NIEA	Scheduled Monument (NI)
NM	National Monument (ROI)
C.I.	Church of Ireland
R.C.	Roman Catholic Church

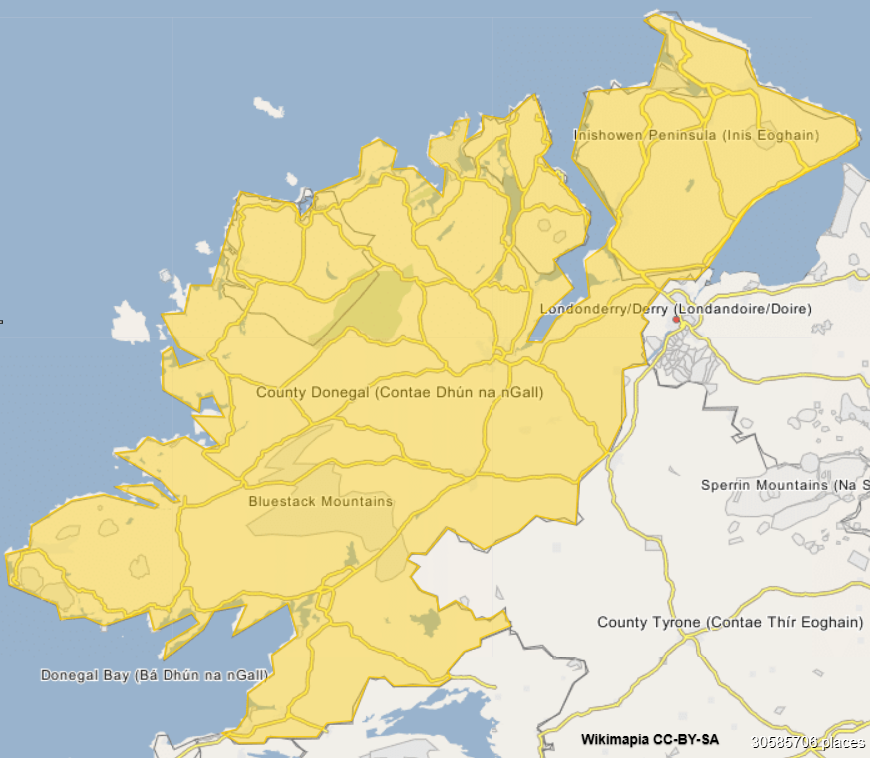
Locations of monastic houses in County Donegal

Foundation	Image	Communities & provenance	Formal name or dedication & alternative names	References & location
Ard Mhuire Friary ^{*}		Capuchin Franciscan Friars		55°07′22″N 7°54′37″W
Assaroe Abbey		Cistercian monks — from Boyle daughter house of Boyle founded 1178 by Roderick O'Cananan, Prince of Tyrconnell or Flaharty; colonized 1179 or 1184; dedicated 1184 by Flaharty O'Muldorry; burnt 1377; plundered by Niall Óg O'Neill, King of Tyrone 1398; dissolved after 1597; granted to Anthony Fyrres 1586	God and St Bernard ____________________ Astrath; Ashroe; Ashrath; Eas-Roe; Es-aeda-ruaid; Inis-Samer; Samaria; Esarua	54°30′33″N 8°12′03″W
Aughnish Monastery		early monastic site, probably not continuing into 11th century; erenaghs until 16th century	Each-inis; Tullyaughnish	
Balleeghan Friary		Franciscan Friars, Third Order Regular founded c.1471; dissolved 1603; granted to James Fullerton 1603	Baile-Aighedh-Chaoin; Baile-Fhindhetain; Ballagha	54°58′52″N 7°36′22″W
Ballymacswiney Friary		Franciscan Friars, Third Order Regular founded 1646 or 1469 by MacSwiney; dissolved before 1607; sold to Sir Ralph Bingley by Henry Perse,1612	Baile-mic-suibhne; Bailli-macquinadoe; Mukish, nr. Castle Doe	55°08′18″N 7°54′50″W
Ballymagrorty Monastery (Drumhome parish)		early monastic site, founded 6th century by St Colmcille	Ballymagroarty	54°33′01″N 8°08′07″W (approx.)
Ballysaggart Friary		Franciscan Friars, Third Order Regular founded c.1500(?) by the Mac-Ruini-Faigs (Mac Swiney Banagh?); dissolved c.1602	Baile-na-sagart; Fan-an-chartha; Fanegarah; Fanogher; Fanegarah	54°35′39″N 8°23′34″W
Bochiminon Friary ^{~≈?}		Carmelite Friars, possibly located in County Donegal, possibly Rathmullen	possibly Rathmullan	
Bothchonais Monastery		early monastic site, Gaelic monks, purportedly founded by Chonas, second husband of Darerca, sister of St Patrick; continuing 11th century	Boithe-conais	55°17′26″N 7°12′34″W (approx.)
Carrickmore Monastery		early monastic site coarbs until 16th century	Carraic; Cairrge	54°55′28″N 7°28′00″W (approx.)
Carrowmore Monastery		early monastic site		55°15′21″N 7°11′20″W
Clonca Monastery		early monastic site, Gaelic monks erenaghs until early 17th century		55°16′04″N 7°10′25″W (given as 55°22′14″N 7°19′48″W on Ordnance Survey map, 1965 - not on 1960 map)
Clondahorkey Monastery		early monastic site; erenagh land 16th-17th century		
Clonenagh Monastery		early monastic site, founded 6th century by St Colmcille	Cluain-enach in Inishowen	
Clonfert-mulloe Monastery		early monastic site, founded before 605; dissolved after 925	Cluain-ferta-molua; Kyle	
Cluain-imurchir		early monastic site, in existence in the time of St Abban	Cluain-nimurchir; Cluain-immorchair	
Clonleigh Monastery		early monastic site, Gaelic monks founded c.530 by St Colmcille; erenaghs until 16th-17th century	Cluain-laegh; Cluain-laig;Cluain-laodb; Croaghan-laodb; Cruachan-ligean; Druim-lighean; Drumleene	54°51′05″N 7°28′56″W
Clonmany Monastery		early monastic site, Gaelic monks founded 6th century by St Colmcille; probably continuing after 1111	Culmaine; Cluain-maine	55°15′41″N 7°24′39″W (approx.)
Conwal Monastery		Gaelic monks founded in early 7th century; erenaghs until early 17th century	Conwall Monastery	54°56′31″N 7°46′58″W
Cnodain Monastery		early monastic site (Note: mentioned by Wm Cobbett)		
Culdaff Monastery		early monastic site; erenaghs to 16th-17th century	Culdabhach; Coldoch; Cooledagh	
Desertegny Monastery		early monastic site, Gaelic monks founded 6th century by St Colmcille; erenaghs until after 1397	Disert-eignigh	55°11′12″N 7°30′54″W (approx.)
Domnach-mor-magene Monastery		early monastic site, Gaelic monks founded 5th century by St Patrick	Domnachmormagene; Domnach-mor-Mag-ene	54°28′53″N 8°16′23″W (approx.)
Donagh Monastery		early monastic site, Gaelic monks founded 5th century by St Patrick	Carndonagh; Domnach-mor-maig-tochair; Domnach-mor-maig-glinne; Domnach-morglinnetochair; Domnachglinne Tochair; Domnachglinne Tochuir	55°15′00″N 7°16′20″W
Donaghmore Monastery		early monastic site, Gaelic monks founded 5th century by St Patrick for Dubudae; possibly continuing after 1111; desolated by 1179; erenagh lands until 1609	Domnach-mor-maige-itha; Donagmore	54°47′29″N 7°33′09″W
Donegal Friary		Observant Franciscan Friars founded 1474 (or 1473) by Aodh Rua (Hugh Rufus) O'Donnell, chief of Tirconnell, and his mother, Nuala O'Connor; plundered and garrisoned by the English 1588; English driven away by Red Hugh 1592; repaired and re-occupied by 1600; abandoned 1601; dissolved 1601; 17th century place of refuge at Lough Eske; removed to Rossnowlagh (extant); (NM)	'Donegal Abbey' ; Donegall; Duin-na-gall; Dunangall; Dungallen	54°39′02″N 8°06′56″W
Drumhome Monastery		early monastic site, Gaelic monks possibly continuing after 1111; erenaghs at least until c.1609	Druim-thuoma; Druim-tuama; Drimholm; Mullanacross	54°35′59″N 8°08′33″W
Eskaheen Monastery		early monastic site	Iskaheen; Uisce-chaoin; Uskechaoin	55°05′22″N 7°16′51″W (approx.)
Fahan Monastery		Gaelic monks founded 6th century by St Colmcille; possibly continuing after 10th century; C.I. parochial church built on site 17th century, now ruined	Fathen-mura; Athan-mura; Fothenmor;Othain-mor; Faynwor; Upper Fahan	55°05′00″N 7°27′39″W
Gartan-Rath Monastery		early monastic site, Gaelic monks founded 521 by St Colmcille	Garton; Gartan; Gortan	55°00′56″N 7°54′31″W
Glencolumbkille Monastery		early monastic site, Gaelic monks founded 6th century by St Colmcille; church on site demolished 1828; C.I. parochial church built on site	Glenn-choluim-chille; Seinglean; Senglend	54°42′37″N 8°43′31″W
Grellagh Monastery		early monastic site	Greallach; Templemoyle	
Inishkeel Monastery		early monastic site, Gaelic monks founded before c.580	Inis Keel; Inis-caoil; Inis-coel	54°50′51″N 8°27′17″W
Inis Saimer Monastery ^{~}		purported monastic site, location given as island off St John's Point (Note: Mervyn Archdall, Monasticon Hibernicum, 1786, p.100) — island does not exist; identified as Assaroe (Note: L. A. Alemande, Monasticum Hibernicum, translated and edited by J. Stevens, 1722, p.204) q.v.	Ines Samer; cf Assaroe	54°30′03″N 8°12′01″W
Inver Monastery		early monastic site, Gaelic monks founded 6th century by St Náile of Kinawley; in parochial use until 1807	Inber-naile	54°38′49″N 8°16′50″W
Inver Friary ^{ø}		purported Franciscan Friars, Third Order Regular (Note: Mervyn Archdall, Monasticon Hibernicum, 1786, p.100, citing J. Ware, De Hibernia, et Antiquitatibus, ejus, 1754 edition, however that source lists only Inver in County Antrim as Franciscan)		
Kilbarron Monastery		early monastic site, Gaelic monks founded 6th century by St Colmcille; erenaghs until early 17th century	Cell-barrainne; Kilvanny	54°32′05″N 8°12′58″W (approx.)
Kilcar Monastery		early monastic site, Gaelic monks founded 6th century by St. Carthach	Kilcartaich; Cell-charthaigh; Killen	54°38′01″N 8°35′31″W (approx.)
Killaghtee Monastery		early monastic site, ruins of three churches; erenagh land until 1609	Cell-aedh-leacht	
Killybegs Friary		Franciscan Friars, Third Order Regular founded c.1535–1540 by MacSwiny Bannagh; dissolved c.1600; Observant Franciscan Friars place of refuge c.1641; church in C.I. parochial use until 1829	St. Catherine ____________________; Cell-beaga;Calebeg; Colebeg; Callobegg-Boylaugh; Kilbeg	54°38′07″N 8°27′00″W
Killybegs Monastery		early monastic site; erenaghs until 1609		
Killydonnell Friary		Franciscan Friars, Third Order Regular founded 1471 by Calvagh O'Donnell, on grant of petition to the Pope by Franciscan brothers Dermit Idurnyn and Dermit Magillacsbuig; dissolved c.1603; granted to Captain Basil Brooke	Cell Ua dTomhrair; Cell-ua-dtomhrair; Kill-odtonaire; Kill-O-Donel	55°01′24″N 7°37′00″W
Kilmacrenan Friary		Franciscan Friars, Third Order Regular founded c.1537 by Manus O'Donnell on an early monastic site (see immediately below); dissolved 1603	Doire Eithne; Cell-mic-Nenain; Cell-mac-n-enain; Cell-mic-creunain; Kilmictrenain	55°01′50″N 7°46′40″W
Kilmacrenan Monastery		early monastic site, Gaelic monks possibly continuing after 1111; site of Franciscan friary (see immediately above)	Doire Eithne; Cell-mic-Nenain; Cell-mac-n-enain; Cell-mic-creunain; Kilmictrenain	55°01′50″N 7°46′40″W
Kilmonaster Monastery		Cistercian monks founded c.1194 by E. O'Dogharty of Tirconnel; dissolved before 1228: united to Assaroe presumably before 1228; grange	Kilfothuir; Hilfothuir; Kill-Fothuir; Cillifori; Kyfeire	54°49′35″N 7°34′38″W
Leck Monastery		early monastic site; erenaghs until 1609 (Note: J. B. Leslie, Raphoe Clergy and Parishes, 1940, p.103)	Lackovenan; Leac; Liacc	
Lough Derg Friary — Saints Island		Augustinian Canons Regular founded on Station Island (see immediately below) c.1130; Franciscan Friars founded before 1631		54°36′56″N 7°53′07″W
Lough Derg Priory — Station Island (see St Patrick's Purgatory)		early monastic site, Gaelic monks founded 5th century by St Patrick or St Dabeoc in the time of St Patrick; Augustinian Canons Regular dependent on Armagh, probably by St Malachy; founded c.1130 (after 1134); Augustinian Canons Regular — Arroasian; adopted after 1140; plundered 1196 by an O'Cairin; destroyed 1207 by Bratachas O'Boyle and M'Mahon; transferred to Saints Island; dissolved after 1600?	St Debeog; St Patrick ____________________; Finnloch; Termon Dabeoc	54°36′57″N 7°52′55″W
Lough Derg Monastery — Station Island		Franciscan Friars founded 1763; dissolved 1781, passed to the clergy of the Diocese of Clogher		
Lough Eske		Franciscan Friars Minor, Conventual, place of refuge 17th century from Donegal		
Magherabeg Friary		Franciscan Friars, Third Order Regular founded after/c.1430 by Niall Garbh (Note: Coll. de Rebus Hibernicis, BM, Add. MS. 4814, Sloane, f. 4) O'Donnell; (Note: J. Ware, De Hibernia, et Antiquitatibus, 1654 edition, p.186) dissolved 1601	An-macaire-beg; Macairebeg; Magherybeg	54°38′29″N 8°07′03″W
Malin Monastery ^{ø}		ancient church, purportedly monastic (Note: Mevyn Archdall, Monasticon Hibernicum, 1786, p.103)	Mala	
Mevagh Monastery		early monastic site, Gaelic monks; erenaghs to 1609; remains of church and cross	Midhbheach; Midbech	55°10′37″N 7°47′37″W
Moville Monastery		early monastic site, Gaelic monks	Domnachbile; Magbile; Norborgh	55°11′17″N 7°02′26″W (approx.)
Moyra Monastery, Ray		site occupied by remains of a 16th-century church		
Mukish Monastery ^{ø}		purported monastic site - probably Ballymacswiney, q.v.	Muckish	
Racoon Monastery, nr. Ballintra		early monastic site, Patrician monks founded c.440	Raithcungi; Raghcunga	54°34′33″N 8°07′37″W (approx.)
Raphoe Monastery		early monastic site, Gaelic monks founded 6th century by St Colmcille; possibly continuing after 1111; episcopal diocesan cathedral built on site	Raith-both	54°52′14″N 7°36′14″W
Rashenny Monastery, in Inishowen	purported early monastic site — confusion with Rath-eanich (Raymoghy, q.v.)			
Rashenny Monastery, nr Killybegs Harbour	purported early monastic site — confusion with Rathen, County Mayo (Note: given as County Donegal by Mervyn Archdall, Monasticon Hibernicum, 1786, p.104)			
Rathmullan Priory		Carmelite Friars possibly founded 1403 and subsequently failed, or (refounded?) 1516 by Owen Roe MacSweeney (Mac Suine Fanagh); plundered by Bingham 1595; dissolved; granted to Sir James Fullerton; assigned to Sir Ralph Bingley; rebuilt as a fortified house by Andrew Knox, Bishop of Raphoe, who had obtained the manor from Turlogh Oge Mac Sweeney; convent in existence c.1737	St Mary ____________________; Rath-maonlain; Rath-mullin; Bath-Mullian; Bochminon?	55°05′40″N 7°32′11″W
Raymoghy Monastery		Gaelic monks possibly not continuing after 10th century		54°56′35″N 7°37′54″W
Rossnowlagh Friary ^{*}		Franciscan friars founded 1946; church and friary opened 1952; extant		54°32′49″N 8°12′23″W
Slieve League Monastery		early monastic site, hermitage associated with St Aedh mac Bricc and St Assicus; erenagh until at least 1609	Sliab-liac	
Taughboyne Monastery		early monastic site, Gaelic monks founded before 635/6 by St Fintan Munna	Tech-baithin	54°56′25″N 7°31′35″W
Temple Douglas				54°58′05″N 7°52′12″W
Templecrone Monastery		early monastic site; erenaghs until at least 1609	Tempall-croine	
Temple Douglas Monastery		early monastic site, purportedly founded 6th century by St Colmcille at church of St Cruithnechan, where he was baptised	Tempall-dubglaise	
Toghernegomarkie Monastery		early monastic site; erenagh lands until at least 1609	Tochar-negomarkie; Ballybogan	
Tory Island Abbey ^{#?}		early monastic site, Columban monks traditionally founded 6th century by St Colmcille; probably used as a refuge by religious orders during the reign of Elizabeth I; ruined and plundered by George Bingham 1595 (NM)	Torach; Toraidhe; Torre	55°15′52″N 8°13′45″W (approx.)
Tullaghobegley Monastery		early monastic site, founded by an O'Begley; erenaghs until 1609	Tulach-an-bigli	55°06′18″N 8°05′27″W (approx.)
Tullyfern Monastery		early monastic site; erenaghs until 1609	Tulach-fionn	

== Map link to lists of monastic houses in Ireland by county ==
Click on a county to go to the corresponding article.	Antrim; Armagh; Down; Fermanagh; Londonderry; Tyrone; Carlow; Cavan; Clare; Cork; Donegal; Dublin; Galway; Kerry; Kildare; Kilkenny; Laois; Leitrim; Limerick; Longford; Louth; Mayo; Meath; Monaghan; Offaly; Roscommon; Sligo; Tipperary; Waterford; Westmeath; Wexford; Wicklow

== See also ==
- List of monastic houses in Ireland
