= List of monastic houses in County Carlow =

The smaller establishments such as monastic cells and notable monastic granges (particularly those with resident monks) and camerae of the military orders of monks (Knights Templars and Knights Hospitallers) are included. The numerous monastic hospitals per se are not included here unless at some time the foundation had, or was purported to have, the status or function of an abbey, priory, or preceptory/commandery.

== Layout ==
Communities/provenance: shows the status and communities existing at each establishment, together with such dates as have been established as well as the fate of the establishment after dissolution, and the current status of the site.

Formal name or dedication: shows the formal name of the establishment or the person in whose name the church is dedicated, where known.

Alternative names: some of the establishments have had alternative names over the course of time. In order to assist in text-searching such alternatives in name or spelling have been provided.

== Abbreviations and key ==
The sites listed are ruins or fragmentary remains unless indicated thus:
*	current monastic function
+	current non-monastic ecclesiastic function
^	current non-ecclesiastic function
=	remains incorporated into later structure
#	no identifiable trace of the monastic foundation remains
~	exact site of monastic foundation unknown
ø	possibly no such monastic foundation at location
¤	no such monastic foundation
≈	identification ambiguous or confused

Locations with names in italics indicate probable duplication (misidentification with another location) or non-existent foundations (either erroneous reference or proposed foundation never implemented).

Trusteeship denoted as follows:
NIEA	Scheduled Monument (NI)
NM	National Monument (ROI)
C.I.	Church of Ireland
R.C.	Roman Catholic Church

This is a list of the monastic houses in County Carlow, Ireland.

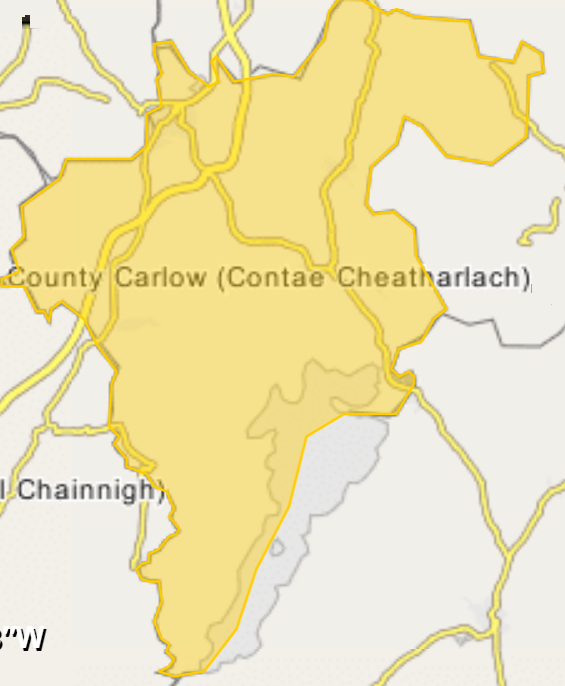
Locations of monastic houses in County Carlow

Foundation	Image	Communities & provenance	Formal name or dedication & alternative names	References & location
Acaun Monastery ^{#}, Rathvilly Parish		supposed monastic site — order and period unknown		52°50′31″N 6°43′02″W (approx)
Agha Monastery		Gaelic monks founded 6th century by St Fintan; possibly not surviving after 10th century	Achad-finglass; Achadfinglass; Achad-Urghlais; Augha	52°43′00″N 6°55′11″W (approx)
Aghade Priory		Augustinian — Arroasian nuns dependent on Dublin; cell of St Mary de Hogges, Dublin; founded 1151 by Dermot mac Murchard, King of Leinster; dissolved before 1500?	Athaddy; Athade; Athad; Aghadh; Aghade Nunnery; Ath-fhadhat	52°45′36″N 6°44′12″W
Athkiltan ^{~}		Knights Templar manor, possibly located in County Carlow	Takyltan	
Ballymoon Preceptory ^{ø}		supposed (though dubious) establishment of Knights Templar purportedly founded c.1300 no record of preceptory found	Bally MacWilliam-roe; Bally-M'William-Row; Baile-mic-Uilliam	52°42′00″N 6°54′26″W
Carlow Monastery		Gaelic monks founded before 601-2 by St Comgal of Bangor, site granted by Cormac, King of Ui Bairrche	Cathair-lach; Ceithiorlach	52°50′03″N 6°55′32″W
Poor Clare Monastery Carlow, Graiguecullen			Monastery of Perpetual Adoration ____________________; Poor Clares founded 19th century	52°50′11″N 6°56′27″W
Clonmore Monastery		Gaelic monks founded 6th century by St Mogue; possibly not surviving after 10th century; church burnt 1040	Cluain-mor-maedoc; Clonemore	52°49′38″N 6°34′10″W
Domnach-feic Monastery		early monastic site, founded 5th century (in the time of St Patrick) by St Fiace	Domnach-feich	
Dunleckney Preceptory ^{#}		purported Knights Templar founded 1300; dissolved 1308 (Note: Dunleckney — Knights Templar preceptory existence: Lewis, Topological Dictionary of Ireland (1837), i, p.584)	Leighlinbridge Preceptory?	52°42′29″N 6°57′13″W
Kilfortchearn Monastery		early monastic site, purportedly founded 5th century (in the time of St Patrick) by St Fortchern, bishop	Cell-foirtcheirn; Ui Drona	
Killerig Preceptory		Knights Templar founded before 1212 (in the reign of King John) by Gilbert de Borard; Knights Hospitaller dissolved 1540; granted to the wife of Gerard Aylmer 1590; leased to James Sherlock of Waterford	The Preceptory of St John the Baptist ____________________; Killargy; Killarge; Friarstown	52°50′46″N 6°47′34″W
Leighlin Abbey ^{+}		Gaelic monks founded c.600 by St Gobban; episcopal diocesan cathedral; destroyed by fire c.1060; new cathedral built 12th-13th century; extant; secular canons purportedly instituted at the cathedral by Bishop John Mulgan (Seaán Ó Maolagáin) c.1422; dissolved 1567	Old Leighlin Abbey; Leth-glenn	52°44′10″N 7°01′32″W
Leighlin Friary ^{≈}	Franciscan Friars, Third Order Regular — erroneous reference to the friary of Bakil, Wicklow (Note: 'Leighlin Friary' — listed by Louis Augustin Alemand, Monasticum Hibernicum, translated and edited by John Stevens, 1722, p.252)			
Leighlin Priory		Augustinian Canons Regular — Arroasian founded after 1163? at the instance of St Lawrence O'Toole (dubious reference to 9th century foundation by Burchard, son of Gurmund, a Norwegian); dissolved c.1392; petition for suppression and appropriation to the cathedral chapter granted by the Pope to the Bishop (Thomas Fleming) 1432	St Stephen	
Leighlinbridge Priory		Carmelite monks founded 1265-72 (before the death of Henry III) by a member of the Carew family; dissolved before 1541; converted into a fort; restored, convent in existence c.1737	Priory of St Mary	52°44′08″N 6°58′42″W
Leighlinbridge Preceptory ^{≈}		Knights Templar apparently same as Dunleckney Preceptory (supra)		
Lorum Monastery		Gaelic monks patron St Laseroam (Molaise)	Leamhdruim	52°39′49″N 6°55′44″W
St Mullin's Monastery		Gaelic monks founded 7th century; (NM)	Achad Cainida; Tech-moling; Thamoling; Temolyn; Shymylyng; Thacineling; Thacmoling	52°29′20″N 6°55′39″W
St Mullin's Abbey		early monastic site, founded 632 by St Molling, site purportedly granted by St Aidan, Bishop of Ferns; purported Augustinian Canons Regular (no documentation of foundation); plundered and burnt before 1138; (NM)	Achad Cainida; Tech-moling; Thamoling; Temolyn; Shymylyng; Thacineling; Thacmoling	52°29′20″N 6°55′39″W
St Mullins Friary		Franciscan Friars, license granted 1414 — no evidence foundation ever implemented	Achad Cainida; Tech-moling; Thamoling; Temolyn; Shymylyng; Thacineling; Thacmoling	
Tullow Abbey ^{#}		Augustinian Friars founded 1314 by Simon Lumbard and Hugh Talun who granted site; dissolved 1541?; granted to Thomas, Earl of Ormond, December 1557	Tully; Tullagh; Tealach-fortchern; Tuluch-ua-bfeidhlimidh; Tullowphelim; Tullyfelim; Laghia; The Black Abbey	52°48′11″N 6°43′58″W
Tullow Friary		Carmelite Friars, given in state papers and listed 1645 — no other evidence of foundation	Tully; Tullagh; Tealach-fortchern; Tuluch-ua-bfeidhlimidh; Tullowphelim; Tullyfelim; Laghia; The Black Abbey	
Tullow Monastery ^{#}		early monastic site, founded 5th century?	Tully; Tullagh; Tealach-fortchern; Tuluch-ua-bfeidhlimidh; Tullowphelim; Tullyfelim; Laghia; The Black Abbey	

== Map link to lists of monastic houses in Ireland by county ==
Click on a county to go to the corresponding article.	Antrim; Armagh; Down; Fermanagh; Londonderry; Tyrone; Carlow; Cavan; Clare; Cork; Donegal; Dublin; Galway; Kerry; Kildare; Kilkenny; Laois; Leitrim; Limerick; Longford; Louth; Mayo; Meath; Monaghan; Offaly; Roscommon; Sligo; Tipperary; Waterford; Westmeath; Wexford; Wicklow

== See also ==
- List of monastic houses in Ireland
- List of National Monuments in County Carlow
- List of country houses in County Carlow
