= List of monastic houses in County Roscommon =

The smaller establishments such as monastic cells and notable monastic granges (particularly those with resident monks) and camerae of the military orders of monks (Knights Templars and Knights Hospitallers) are included. The numerous monastic hospitals per se are not included here unless at some time the foundation had, or was purported to have, the status or function of an abbey, priory, or preceptory/commandery.

== Layout ==
Communities/provenance: shows the status and communities existing at each establishment, together with such dates as have been established as well as the fate of the establishment after dissolution, and the current status of the site.

Formal name or dedication: shows the formal name of the establishment or the person in whose name the church is dedicated, where known.

Alternative names: some of the establishments have had alternative names over the course of time. In order to assist in text-searching such alternatives in name or spelling have been provided.

== Abbreviations and key ==
The sites listed are ruins or fragmentary remains unless indicated thus:
*	current monastic function
+	current non-monastic ecclesiastic function
^	current non-ecclesiastic function
=	remains incorporated into later structure
#	no identifiable trace of the monastic foundation remains
~	exact site of monastic foundation unknown
ø	possibly no such monastic foundation at location
¤	no such monastic foundation
≈	identification ambiguous or confused

Locations with names in italics indicate probable duplication (misidentification with another location) or non-existent foundations (either erroneous reference or proposed foundation never implemented).

Trusteeship denoted as follows:
NIEA	Scheduled Monument (NI)
NM	National Monument (ROI)
C.I.	Church of Ireland
R.C.	Roman Catholic Church

Foundation	Image	Communities & provenance	Formal name or dedication & alternative names	References & location
Ardcarn Priory		early monastic site, founded in the 6th century; diocesan cathedral; Augustinian Canons Regular — Arroasian? founded after 1144?; church possibly shared by Canons and nuns (see immediately below); dissolved c.1593?; granted to the provost and fellows of Holy Trinity Dublin	Ard-carna; Ard-charna	53°58′02″N 8°12′06″W
Ardcarn Priory		Augustinian nuns — Arroasian? founded after 1144, possibly by St Malachy; dependent on Kilcreevanty from before 1223; church possibly shared by Canons (see immediately above) and nuns; dissolved c.1590?; granted to Terence (Tirlaughe O'Byrne) 1595;	St Mary	
Ardcarn Friary ^{¤}	recorded as Franciscan Friars — no monastic house; Friars of Knockvicar owned land in the parish			
Ardsenlis Monastery ^{~≈}		early monastic site, nuns founded in the 5th century by St Patrick; possibly located in County Roscommon	Senlis?	
Assylin Monastery		early monastic site, founded probably before 563 by St Colmcille; often mistaken for Inshmacnerin	Eas-mac-n-Eirc; Eas-ui-fhloinn	53°58′05″N 8°19′11″W
Athleague Priory		Augustinian Canons Regular — Arroasian probable cell, dependent on Roscommon; founded before 1266; dissolved before 1466, vicarage granted to the prior of Rindown	Athliag-maenagain; Aghliag	53°34′14″N 8°15′40″W
Baslick Monastery		early monastic site, probably founded in the 5th century (in the time of St Patrick); plundered by Norsemen 846	Baisleac-mor; Basleac	53°47′09″N 8°25′44″W
Bellaneeny Friary		Camelite Friars dependent on Eglish; founded after c.1437; dissolved c.1567, possibly abandoned by the Carmelites; leased to Edmund O'Fallon of Athlone 1575; Franciscan Friars? possibly in occupation in the 16th century (during the reign of Elizabeth I)	Baleanany; Bealaneny; Belathnaony	53°24′26″N 8°09′25″W
Bettyfield Abbey ^{ø}		probably a secular chapel	Shankill	53°50′17″N 8°13′14″W
Boyle Abbey		early monastic site, possibly founded in the 5th century, possibly by St Patrick; sometimes confused with Ath-da-larc, County Meath; Cistercian monks — from Buniffi (community founded from Grelachdinach 16 August 1148 by Abbot Peter O'Mordha) founded 1161; affiliated to Clairvaux 1228; dissolved c.1589; granted to Patrick Dusacke of Gerrardston; (NM)	Ath-da-Larc; Ath-da-laarcc; Ath-da-laragh; Buell; Buill; Mainister-na-buill	53°58′26″N 8°17′49″W
Boyle Nunnery		nuns, "ruined nunnery" (Note: Ordnance Survey) possibly historically located in County Sligo		
Caldragh Friary		Franciscan Friars, Third Order Regular founded before 1487?; dissolved 1582?; leased to Bryan M'Dermot 1582; granted to Thomas Danby (Note: Harris's Table, Ware-Harris, Antiquities, 1745)	Caldrywolagh; Caldra; Ceall-braughe-uallaighe	
Caldragh Nunnery		nuns "nunnery in ruins"		53°52′43″N 8°14′34″W
Cam Monastery		early monastic site, nuns	Camma; Camach	53°27′21″N 8°07′48″W
Cloonard Abbey ^{ø} (Tibohine parish)		"Cloonard abbey and church" (Note: Memorial Atlas of Ireland, 1901)		53°48′24″N 8°30′53″W
Cloonburren Monastery		early monastic site, nuns founded before 577-8 by Cairech Dergen; probably dissolved before 1167	Cluain-bronaigh; Clooncagh	53°18′43″N 8°02′57″W (approx)
Clooncraff Monastery		early monastic site, founded before 752; plundered 815	Cluain-crema; Cluain cremtha	53°51′31″N 8°03′30″W (approx)
Cloonoghil Cell		Augustinian nuns — Arroasian dependent on Kilcreevanty; founded before 1223, confirmed to the nuns of Kilcreevanty c.1223 and 1400; dissolved c.1543?	St Mary ____________________; Cluain-eochaill; Cluain-ockill	53°23′33″N 8°05′52″W
Cloonowen Monastery		early monastic site, possibly founded in the 6th century; plundered by the Munster men 1089	Cluain-emhain; Cluain-emuin	53°22′43″N 7°56′06″W (approx)
Clonrahan Friary ^{~}		Franciscan Friars, Third Order Regular founded after 1485 by Cathal O'Conor Roe (Rufus); dissolved (during the reign of Elizabeth I)	Cloon-rane; Cloon-sreane; Cloon-rohan	
Cloonshanville Priory, near Frenchpark		early monastic site, founded in the 5th century? (by the time of St Patrick); Dominican Friars founded 1385 by Mac Dermot Roe (Rufus); priory leased to Hugh boy O'Donnell 1577; lands leased to the mayor of Galway 1578; friary leased to Bryan Mac Dermot 1580; dissolved before 1596; leased to William Taaffe of Sligo 1596; friary later owned by Lord Dillan and rented by a Protestant named Davis	The Holy Cross ____________________; Cluain-sainmhill; Cluain-senmall; Cluain-maoil	53°52′03″N 8°23′25″W
Cloontuskert Priory		early monastic site, founded in the 6th century by St Faithlinn; Augustinian Canons Regular — Arroasian founded after 1140, probably by an O'Conor - possibly Turlough O'Conor; dissolved 1563?; granted to Fryall O'Farrell	Cluain-tuaiscirt-na-dina	53°41′53″N 8°00′48″W
Creeve Monastery		early monastic site, founded in the early 6th century? by St Finnian of Clonard	Craebh-ghrellain; Craebh-mor	53°52′09″N 8°13′15″W (approx)
Deerane Abbey		Augustinian Canons Regular — Arroasian — from Roscommon founded before 1156?, site granted by O'Conor; double monastery with nuns' priory (see immediately below) until 1223-4; dissolved c.1578?; Augustinian Friars	St Mary ____________________; Dhoran; Daren; Deerane; Derreen; Doren; Dorhan	53°39′42″N 8°08′58″W (approx?)
Deerane Priory		Augustinian nuns — Arroasian double monastery with Canons' abbey (see immediately above) founded after 1144; dependent on Kilcreevanty from before 1223; dissolved after 1223-4		53°39′42″N 8°08′58″W (approx?)
Domnach-mor Monastery ^{≈~}		early monastic site, possible duplication		
Drum Monastery		early monastic site, founded in the late 5th century? by Diradius (not Diratus of Ferns), brother of St Canoc	Edardruim	53°23′54″N 8°01′49″W
Drumalgagh Priory		Augustinian nuns — Arroasian dependent on Clonard; founded before 1195, confirmed to the nuns of Clonard; dependent on Kilcreevanty from before 1223, confirmed to the nuns of Kilcreevanty c.1223 and 1400; dissolved c.1543?; owned by Earl of Clanricarde 1641	St Mary ____________________; Druimeliar; Drumcliff; Dromalga	53°18′02″N 8°06′06″W (approx)
Drumconnel Monastery ^{~}		early monastic site, founded in the 5th century (in the time of St Patrick) by St Conal?; also given as located in County Galway	Druim-conaille	
Drumconaid Abbey		Cistercian monks — from Boyle founded c.1156, transferred from Grellechdinach; dissolved 1158-9: transferred to Buniffi/Boyle c.1158/9	Drumcunny; Drum-conaid	54°02′18″N 8°07′42″W (approx)
Dysart Abbey ^{ø}		Cistercian monks land granted to St Mary's Abbey, Dublin by Rory O'Conor not later than 1236; abbey probably never built	Briole; Bruigheol	
Elphin Cathedral Monastery		early monastic site, traditionally founded c.450 (434 or 435) by St Patrick; diocesan cathedral c.1130; see transferred to Roscommon 1152; see transferred from Roscommon c.1168; Augustinian Canons Regular - Arroasian? founded after 1140; see transferred from Elphin 1244; dissolved before 1442; storm damaged 1957, demolished shortly afterwards; ruins partially restored	St Mary ____________________; Ailfinn; Ail-find; Oilfinn; Olfin; Emlach-ono	53°50′43″N 8°11′26″W
Elphin Greyfriars ^{=}		early monastic site, founded in the 5th century by St Patrick, tradition that Ono, son of Oengus gifted his house to St Patrick; Franciscan Friars Minor, Conventual founded before 1453, parish church of St Patrick granted to the friars by Cornelius, Bishop of Elphin before 1450, Cornelius was instructed by the Pope to license new friaries 1453; dissolved 1563, friars expelled by the Protestant bishop, who demolished the friary and built a house from the ruins; granted to Terence O'Birne-Termor; erroneously referred to as Dominican in inquisition 1591	St Patrick	
Elphin Greyfriars, later site		Observant Franciscan Friars reformed 1632		
Emlagh Monastery		early monastic site, founded in the 5th century?, bishop listed in the time of St Patrick	Imblech-each; Imblech-brocadha	53°44′43″N 8°27′22″W
Fuerty Monastery		early monastic site, founded in the 5th century by St Patrick for deacon Just	Fidard; Fidarte	53°36′37″N 8°16′07″W
Grange Abbey, Kilbride parish		purported abbey (Note: Memorial Atlas of Ireland, 1901 and Ordnance Survey (½ inch))	Kilcrea	53°43′44″N 8°13′09″W
Grellachdinach Priory ^{~}		Cistercian monks — from Mellifont founded 1148; dissolved 1155-6, transferred to Drumconaid, Bunfinny and Boyle; possibly located in County Roscommon	Grellechdinach	
Inchmacnerin Abbey, Church Island, Lough Key		early monastic site, Patrician monks founded in the 6th century; Augustinian Canons Regular — Arroasian? founded 1140-70?; dissolved before 1596; founded post1140; dissolved 1569?; granted to William Taaffe 1596; (NM)	St Mary ____________________; Inis-mac-n-erin; Insula-Macnery; Insula-Machum; Inch-vicrinni; Church Island, Lough Key (not Eas-mac-eirc, as given by some, which is Assylin (q.v.))	53°59′40″N 8°15′38″W
Inchmean Priory	Benedictine monks — duplication of Inchmean, County Mayo (Note: duplication by Mervyn Archdall, Monasticon Hibernicum, 1786, due to error in Louis Augustin Alemand, Monasticum Hibernicum, translated and edited by John Stevens, 1722)			
Kilbride Abbey ^{ø}		"Abbey" (Note: Memorial Atlas of Ireland, 1901 and Ordnance Survey) possibly connected with Derrane Priory, supra		53°42′05″N 8°10′30″W
Kilcanuran Monastery		early monastic site	Cill-ceanuran; Beech Abbey	53°53′36″N 8°07′46″W
Kilconan Abbey ^{ø}		"Abbey", founded 1339 (Note: Mervyn Archdall, Monasticon Hibernicum, 1786, pp. 290-1, erroneously attributes references to a church in Annals of Loch Cé, edited by William Maunsell Hennessy, M.R.I.A., Dublin, 1939, as being of an abbey)		
Kilcooley Monastery		early monastic site (Note: Acta Sanctorum veteris et majoris Scotiae, seu Hiberniæ, Sanctorum Insulae..., p.377)	Cell-cuile; Cul-silinne; Kilchule	53°46′07″N 8°12′24″W
Kildallog Monastery ^{≈~}		early monastic site	Kiltrustan?, (infra)	53°48′58″N 8°06′13″W (?)
Killaraght Monastery	Historical county location. See entry under List of monastic houses in County Sligo			
Killinmulrooney Cell		Augustinian nuns — Arroasian dependent on Kilcreevanty; founded before 1223, church granted to the nuns of Kilcreevanty by Pope Honorius III c.1223 and by Pope Boniface IX 1400; dissolved 1543?	St Mary ____________________; Cuilleen	53°20′38″N 8°08′29″W (approx)
Kilmore Monastery		early monastic site, purportedly founded in the 5th century by St Patrick for Conleng and Ercleng; mistaken by early sources for Kilmore, County Cavan; Augustinian Canons Regular 155 183; Augustinian Friars	Cella-magna-deathreab; Cell-mor-maige-glaiss; Cell-mor-tir-briuin-na-sina; Moyglass	53°53′21″N 8°00′31″W
Kilmore Monastery		possible early monastic site separate from above, founded in the 6th century by St Colmcille; burned by the Ui Cremthainn 757	Cell-mor-dithrib	53°53′40″N 8°00′42″W
Kilnamanagh Monastery		early monastic site, founded in the 5th century by St Patrick	Cluain-na-manach	53°53′40″N 8°23′55″W
Kilronan Abbey		6th century		
Kiltrustan Monastery ^{≈~}		early monastic site; (Note: Gazetteer of Great Britain and Ireland, iv, p.2) possibly Kildallog	Kildallog?, (supra)	
Knockvicar Friary		Franciscan Friars, Third Order Regular foundation unknown erroneously referred to as Dominican Friars, purportedly by the Bingham family, (Note: Louis Augustin Alemand,Monasticum Hibernicum, edited and translated by John Stevens, 1722; p.227) however they were not in Ireland at the time; (Note: J. O'Heyne, O.P., Irish Dominicans (Epil. Chron. ..), (translated by A. Coleman, O.P., 1902), 1706, p. 271) dissolved c.1583-4; granted to Richard Kendlemarch (Kyndelinshe)	Cnoc-bhicarre; Cnoc-an-bicairi	54°00′06″N 8°12′03″W
Lissonuffy Cell		Augustinian Canons Regular — Arroasian dependent on Cong; foundation unknown; dissolved before 1592; granted to Trinity College, Dublin	Liss-O-nDubhthaig; Lyssenowfe; Lis-duffe; Lys-duffe	53°44′28″N 7°59′32″W
Loughkey Abbey		early monastic site, founded by 700; (Note: Conry: Mervyn Archdall, Monasticon Hibernicum, 1786, p.614); Premonstratensian Canons daughter of Prémontré founded after 1217-8 (c.1215) by Clarus MacMailin, archdeacon of Elphin; raised to abbey status c.1235; held in commendam by Rory MacDermot from 1548; granted to Robert Harrison 1594; dissolved after 1600?, monks probably remained in occupation until 1608; (NM)	The Holy Trinity ____________________; Lough Cé; Trinity Island	53°59′21″N 8°15′16″W
Monasterevan Monastery ^{≈~}		purportedly Augustinian Canons Regular or Crutched Friars (if Rindown)	Rindown?; Monastereoin?	
Ogulla Monastery		early monastic site	Oghdeala	53°46′39″N 8°16′34″W
Oran Monastery		early monastic site, founded in the 5th century by St Patrick	Uaran; Huaran; Cell-garad; Ballydooley	53°40′26″N 8°20′24″W
Rindown Priory Hospital		Crutched Friars (or less likely Knights Hospitaller) founded before 1216, believed to be by King John for the Cruciferi or for the Knights Hospitallers; plundered 1229; raided by Felim O'Conor 1216; burnt by Aed O'Conor 1270 dissolved before 1569; granted to Christopher Davers 1569; leased to George Goodman 1588	St John the Baptist ____________________; Randoon; Rinnduin; Renydwyn; Tea-eon; St John's de Rynndum; Monaster-eoin-baisde; Monaster-evin	53°32′38″N 8°00′09″W
Rindown Priory ^{~≈}		Premonstratensian Canons, possible confusion with Monasterevan, supra	Monasterevan?	53°32′17″N 7°59′36″W
Roscommon Abbey		early monastic site, founded in the 6th century by St Comman, disciple of St Finnian of Clonard; diocesan cathedral see translated from Elphin 1152; see translated to Elphin c.1168; Augustinian Canons Regular — Arroasian founded after 1140, possibly with Arroasian reformation 1140-8 by Turlogh O'Conor at the instance of St Malachy; plundered by William de Burgo 1204; burned by the Anglo-Normans 1235 and 1247; plundered by Mac William de Burgo 1260; dissolved before 1578; granted to Sir Nicholas Malbye 1578; granted to Francis Viscount Valentia 1615; Augustinian Friars	St Mary ____________________; Ros-comain; Ros-chomon; Ros-camain; Ros-coman	53°37′44″N 8°11′26″W
Roscommon Priory		Augustinian nuns — Arroasian founded after 1144; possible double monastery with Roscommon Abbey (see immediately above); dependent on Kilcreevanty after 1223, church confirmed to the nuns of Kilcreevanty by Pope Honorius III c.1223 and by Pope Boniface IX 1400; dissolved after 1223-4, nuns probably transferred to Termonkeelin after 1223-4	St Mary	
Roscommon Blackfriars		Dominican Friars founded 1253 by Felim O'Conor, King of Connacht, buried here; consecrated 1257 by Thomas O'Conor, Bishop of Elphin; burned 1270; Dominican Annals of Roscommon written up to 1314 dissolved 1573; leased to Thomas le Strange 1573; ruinous by 1612; granted to Francis Viscount Valentia 1615; friars remained in the vicinity, continuing into the 19th century	The Friary Church of the Blessed Virgin Mary, Roscommon	53.624733°N 8.191921°W
Roscommon Greyfriars		Franciscan Friars founded 1268–69, founder unknown; dissolved 1270 when burned; could not be restored as the founder had died		
Templemoyle Abbey		possible early monastic site	Kilnanooan	53°48′11″N 8°17′06″W
Termonkeelin Priory		Augustinian nuns — Arroasian — possibly from Derrane and Roscommon dependent on Kilcreevanty; founded after 1223-4; dissolved during the reign of Queen Elizabeth?	Termon-caelaind; Termon-Keelan	53°46′57″N 8°28′02″W
Tibohine Monastery		early monastic site, founded probably in the late 6th century by St Baithen Mac Cuanach; plundered by the king of Feara-Manach 1201; plundered by Aed Muimnech 1233	Tech-Baithin; Teach-Baithin	53°52′55″N 8°27′05″W (?)
Tisrara Nunnery		"Nunnery"		53°31′25″N 8°13′31″W (approx)
Toberelly Friary		Franciscan Friars, Third Order Regular cell or chapel, foundation unknown; dissolved during the reign of Queen Elizabeth	Toberelvy; Tobar-ailbhe?	53°45′32″N 8°19′38″W
Toomona Friary		Franciscan Friars, Third Order Regular founded in the 15th century?, founded by the O'Conor family; also dubiously given as Dominican Friars dissolved 1585-8; granted to Richard Kyndelinshe (Kendlemarch) 1588	Tuaim-mona; Toemonia; Towemona; Tumona	53°46′11″N 8°17′28″W
Tulsk Priory		Dominican Friars founded 1448 by a (Mac)Dowell or other, land granted by Felim (Fedlimid) mac Fedlimid O'Conor, buried here; dissolved before 1591?; land granted to Terence O'Byrne 1594; friary granted to William Taaffe 1596; repaired by Bingham 1595	St Patrick ____________________; Tulsk Abbey; Tuilsce; Tuillsgi; Twilskye	53°46′42″N 8°15′14″W

== Map link to lists of monastic houses in Ireland by county ==
Click on a county to go to the corresponding article.	Antrim; Armagh; Down; Fermanagh; Londonderry; Tyrone; Carlow; Cavan; Clare; Cork; Donegal; Dublin; Galway; Kerry; Kildare; Kilkenny; Laois; Leitrim; Limerick; Longford; Louth; Mayo; Meath; Monaghan; Offaly; Roscommon; Sligo; Tipperary; Waterford; Westmeath; Wexford; Wicklow

== See also ==
- List of monastic houses in Ireland
