= Adare Franciscan Friary =

Monastery in Adare, Ireland

Coordinates: 52.569125°N 8.776424°W

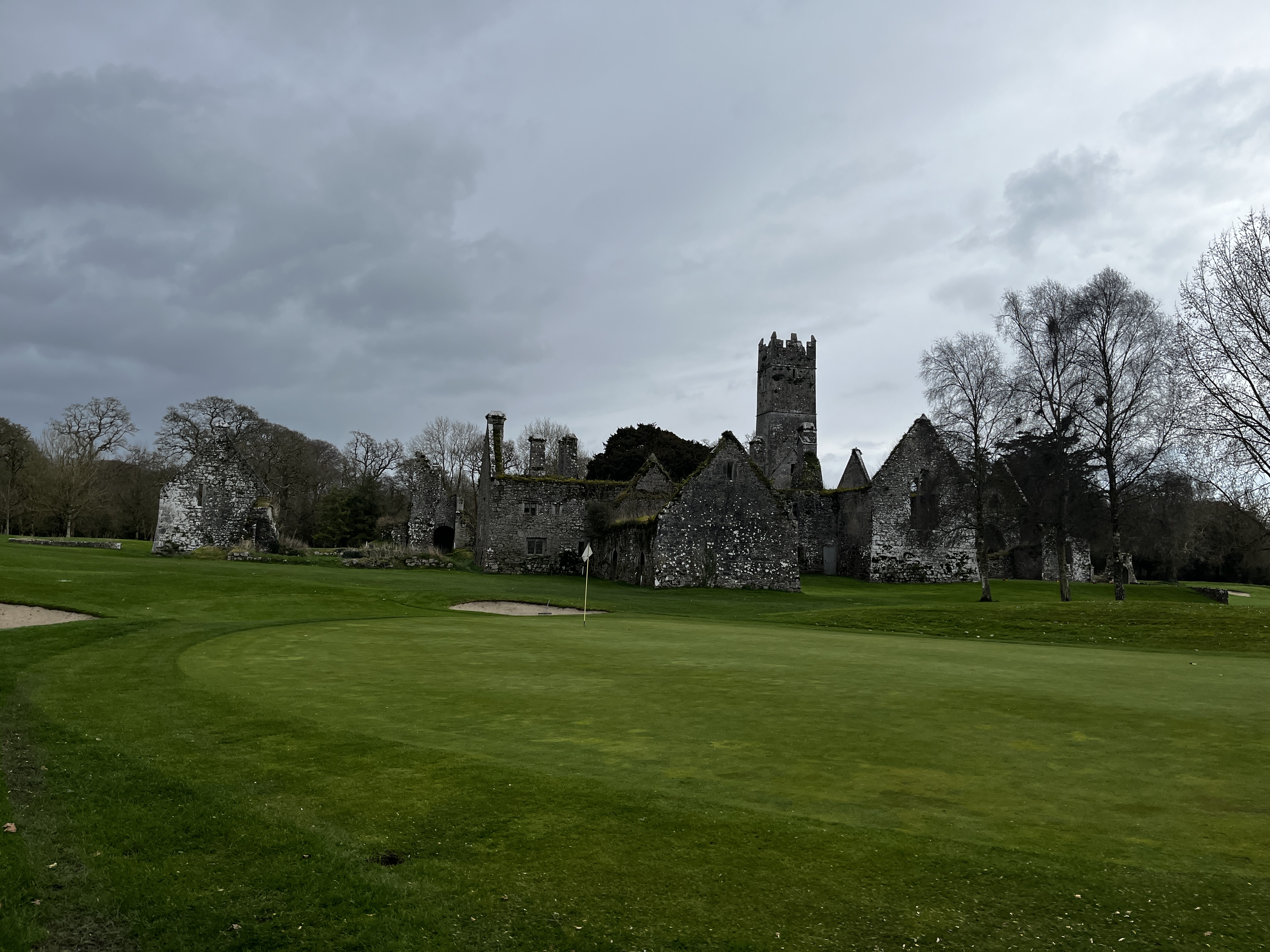

Monastery information
- Other names: St. Michael Archangel of the Friars Minor
- Order: Franciscans
- Established: 1464

Architecture
- Style: Gothic

Site
- Location: Adare, County Limerick
- Country: Ireland
- Public access: No

The Adare Franciscan Friary was a medieval monastery in Adare, County Limerick, Ireland. It is not to be confused with two other monastic structures in the village: the Augustinian Adare Friary and the Trinitarian Adare Abbey. Today, the complex consists of largely intact ruins on the grounds of Adare Manor Golf Club, in the vicinity of Adare Manor.

== History ==
Also known as the church of St. Michael Archangel of the Friars Minor, the friary was founded in 1464 by Thomas FitzGerald, 7th Earl of Kildare and his wife Johanna. The site contains numerous burials, with some gravestones from the eighteenth century still visible. Like many medieval monasteries, the buildings include a chapel, refectory, and cloister, as well as arcosolia and two large gothic windows. It was attacked and burned by parliamentary forces in 1646.

== See also ==
List of monastic houses in County Limerick
