= Monastic cell =

Small room used by a hermit, monk, anchorite or nun to live and as a devotional space

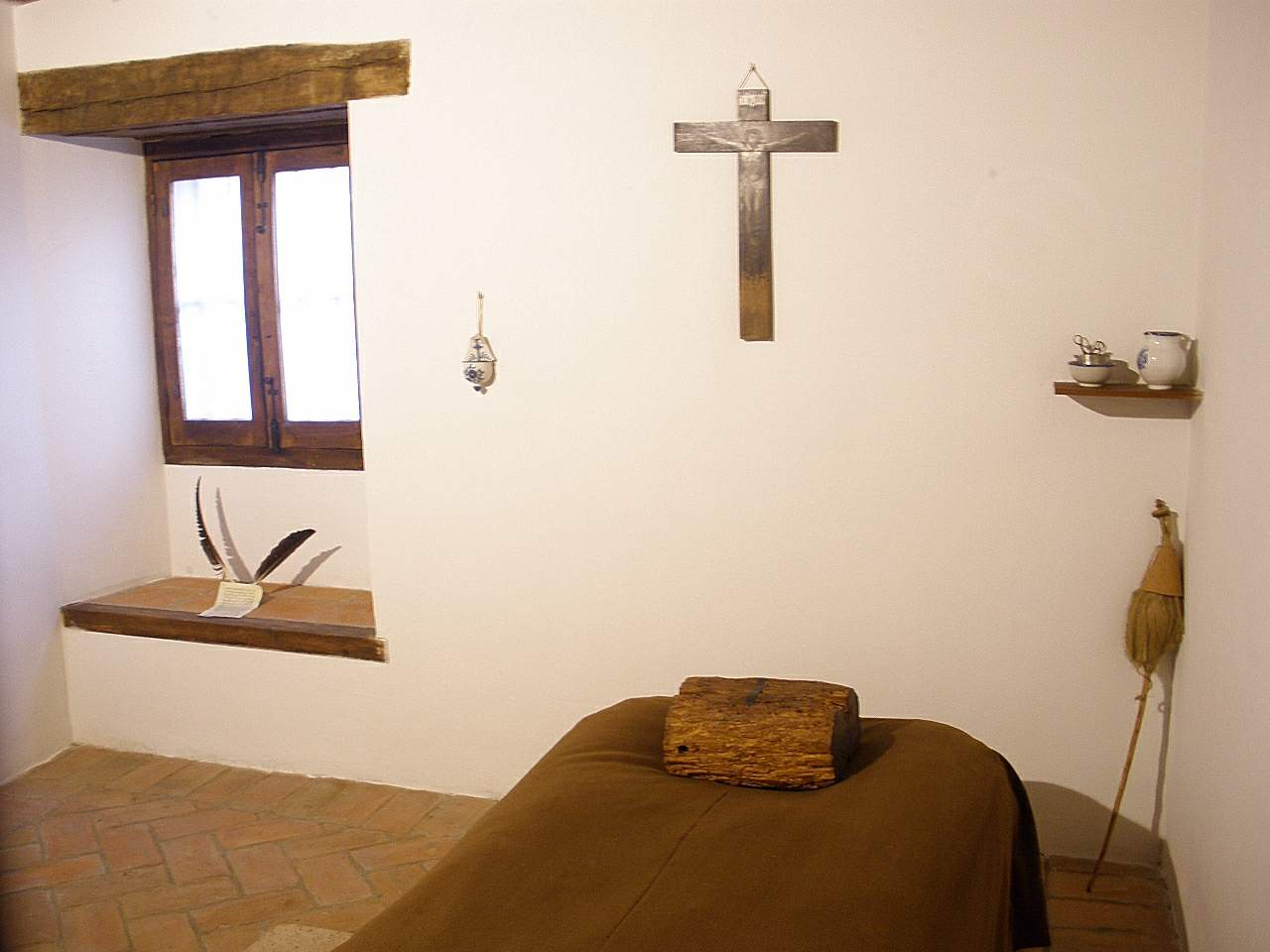
Cell of Teresa of Ávila in the Convent of Saint Joseph

A cell is a small room used by a monk, nun, hermit or anchorite to live and as a devotional space. Cells are often part of larger cenobitic monastic communities such as Catholic, Lutheran, Anglican and Orthodox monasteries, as well as Buddhist vihara, but may also form stand-alone structures in remote locations. The word cell comes from the Old French celle meaning a monastic cell, itself from the Latin meaning "room", "store room" or "chamber".

Usually, a cell is small and contains a minimum of furnishings. It may be an individual living space in a building or a hermit's primitive solitary living space, possibly a cave or hut in a remote location. A small dependent or daughter house of a major monastery, sometimes housing just one or two monks or nuns, may also be termed a cell.

The first cells were in the Nitrian Desert in Egypt following the ministry of Paul of Thebes, Serapion of Thmuis, and Anthony the Great in the mid 3rd century.

In some orders, such as the Trappists, the monks or nuns do not have cells but sleep in a large room called a dormitory. In eremitic orders like the Carthusians, the room called cell usually has the size and look of a small house with a separate garden.

== Buddhism ==
In Buddhism, a vihara was a living arrangement similar to a Christian monastery. The term "kuti" is also used.

== See also ==
- Kathisma#Monastic cell – Divisions of psalms in Eastern Orthodox Church
- Lavra – Type of monastery consisting of a cluster of cells or caves centered on a church
- Poustinia – Place of seclusion
- Prison cell – Small room in a prison or police station where a prisoner is held
- Skete – Type of monastic settlement
- Therapeutae – Religious sect
