= List of monastic houses in County Cork =

This is a list of the monastic houses in County Cork, Ireland.

The smaller establishments such as monastic cells and notable monastic granges (particularly those with resident monks) and camerae of the military orders of monks (Knights Templars and Knights Hospitallers) are included. The numerous monastic hospitals per se are not included here unless at some time the foundation had, or was purported to have, the status or function of an abbey, priory, or preceptory/commandery.

== Layout ==
Communities/provenance: shows the status and communities existing at each establishment, together with such dates as have been established as well as the fate of the establishment after dissolution, and the current status of the site.

Formal name or dedication: shows the formal name of the establishment or the person in whose name the church is dedicated, where known.

Alternative names: some of the establishments have had alternative names over the course of time. In order to assist in text-searching such alternatives in name or spelling have been provided.

== Abbreviations and key ==
The sites listed are ruins or fragmentary remains unless indicated thus:
*	current monastic function
+	current non-monastic ecclesiastic function
^	current non-ecclesiastic function
=	remains incorporated into later structure
#	no identifiable trace of the monastic foundation remains
~	exact site of monastic foundation unknown
ø	possibly no such monastic foundation at location
¤	no such monastic foundation
≈	identification ambiguous or confused

Locations with names in italics indicate probable duplication (misidentification with another location) or non-existent foundations (either erroneous reference or proposed foundation never implemented).

Trusteeship denoted as follows:
NIEA	Scheduled Monument (NI)
NM	National Monument (ROI)
C.I.	Church of Ireland
R.C.	Roman Catholic Church

Locations of monastic houses in County Cork
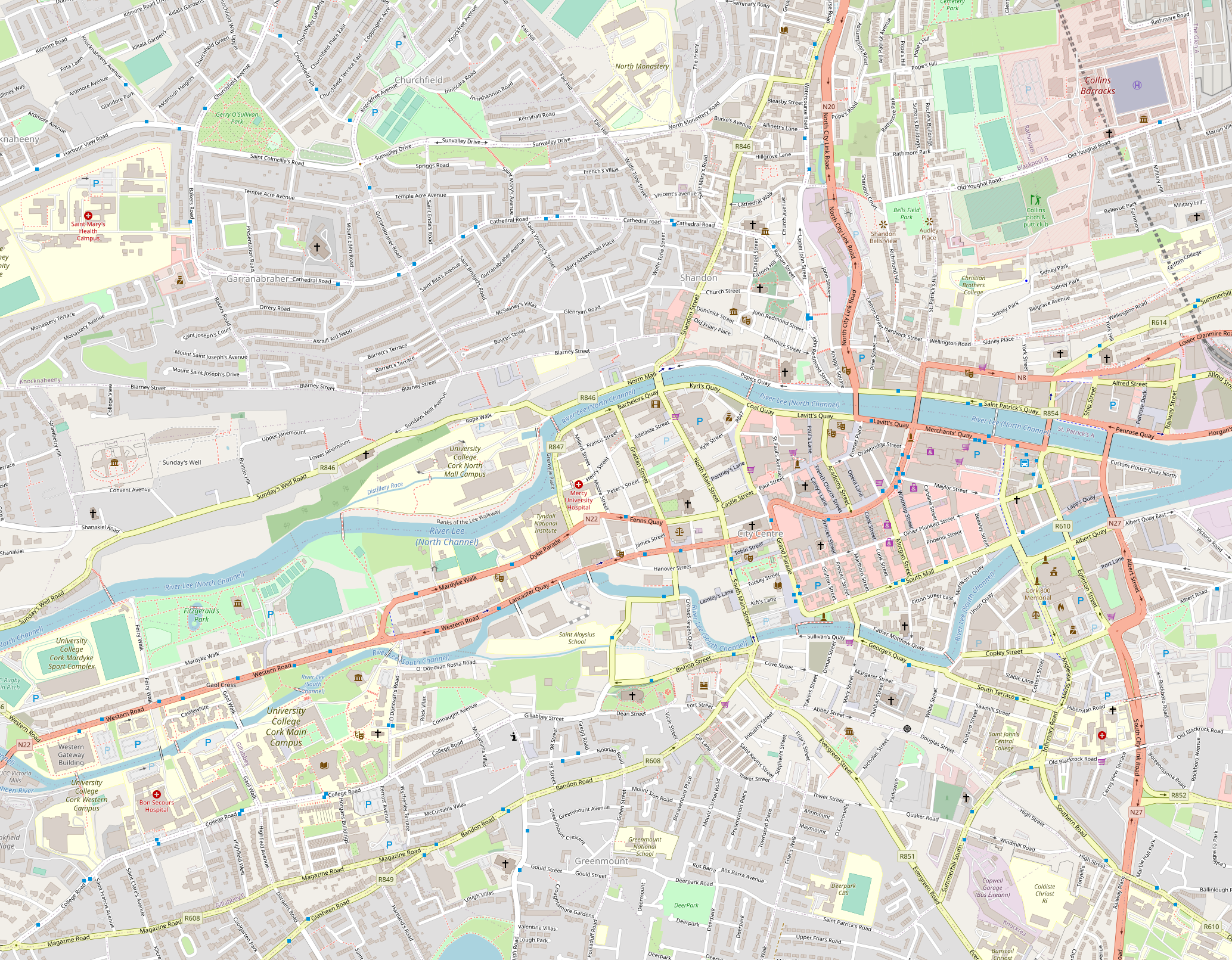
Locations of monastic houses in County Cork
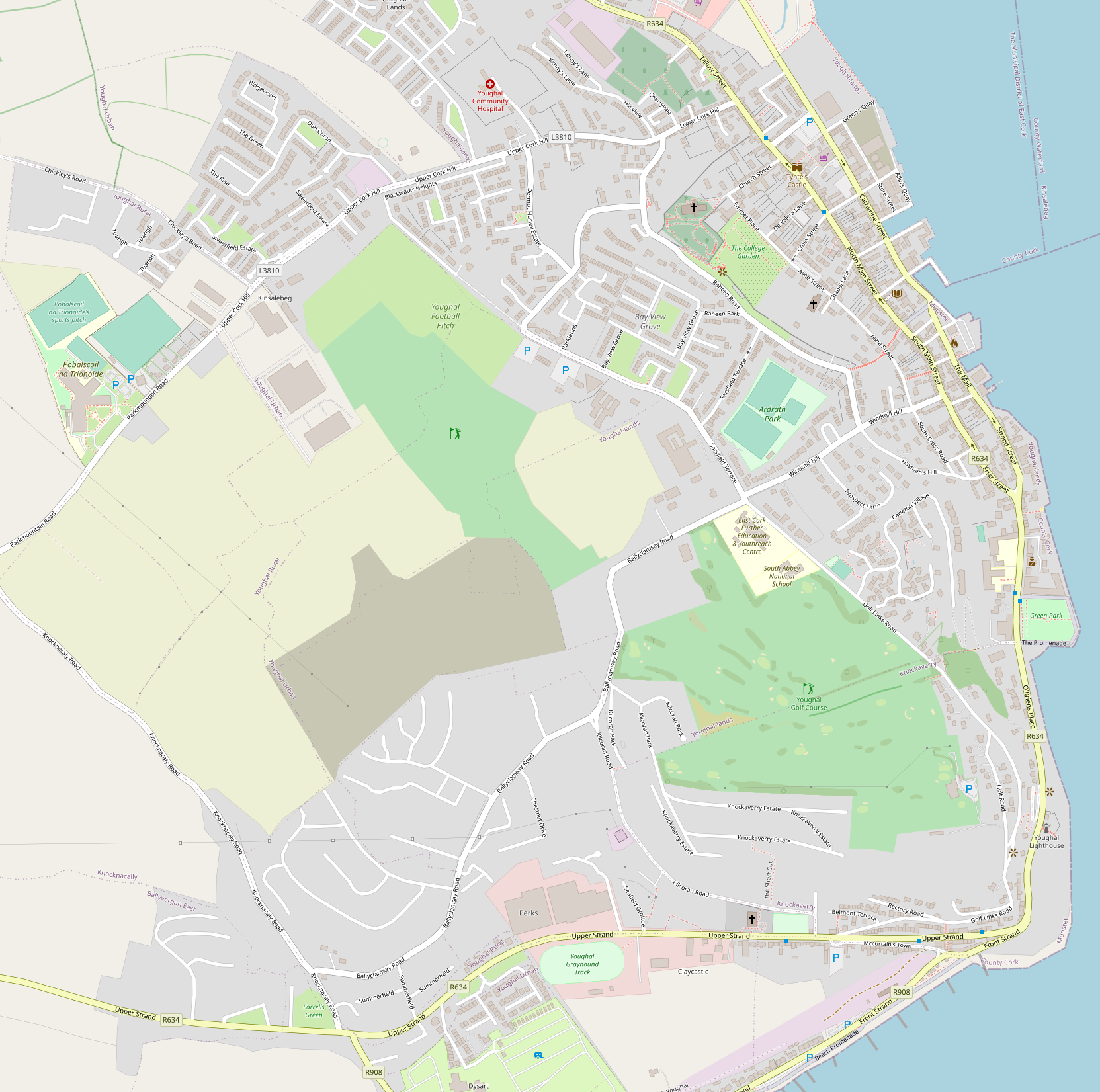
Locations of monastic houses in Youghal

Foundation	Image	Communities & provenance	Formal name or dedication & alternative names	References & location
Abbeymahon Abbey		Cistercian monks — from Baltinglass, County Wicklow; (community founded at Aghamanister 1172); transferred from Aghamanister before 1278; founded 1278 by Count McSheribay; jurors deemed the church to have been in parochial use from time immemorial February 1541; dissolved 1541; leased to Viscount Barrymore 1568; leased to Nicholas Walshe, Justice of Munster, 1584; granted in perpetuity to Walshe 1587	Abbey Mahon Abbey; Fons Vivus; Maun; Maure; O'Manne; Ui-Badamna; O'Badvine; Obalvine	51°38′12″N 8°44′11″W
Abbeystrowry Abbey		Cistercian monks — from Abbeymahon founded after 1228 possibly restored as an abbey before 1281, and shortly failed; dissolved after 1281; cell of Abbeymahon from 1281; dissolved c.1541	Strowry Abbey; Mainistre-Inscorrye; Shrowry; Flumen Vivum?	51°33′06″N 9°17′19″W
Aghadown Monastery		early monastic site, Gaelic monks round tower standing until 18th century	Aughadown; Achad-duine	51°32′19″N 9°23′12″W
Aghamanister Abbey		Cistercian monks — from Baltinglass; founded 1172 by Dermot MacCormac MacCarthy, King of Desmond dissolved before 1278: transferred to Abbeymahon	Ui Badamna; Abbey	51°37′32″N 8°46′28″W
Ballybeg Priory		Augustinian Canons Regular founded 1229 by Philip de Barry; dissolved 1541; granted to George Bouchier, Esq c.1573 (who forfeited for non-payment of rent); granted to Stephen Walter of Cork in 1583	St Thomas	52.219334°N 8.669831°W
Ballygarvan Monastery ^{~}, Carrigaline parish		supposed monastic site — order, foundation and period unknown		51°49′05″N 8°29′19″W (approx)
Ballymacadane Abbey		Augustinian nuns founded c.1450? by Cormac MacCarthy MacTiege Laider; dissolved1539?; site granted to Franciscan Friars (see immediately below)	Balie-macedan; Bally-macedan; Bally-magadain; Bally-vacadane	51°50′18″N 8°34′09″W
Ballymacadane Friary		Franciscan Friars, Third Order Regular founded after 1539? on site of Augustinian nunnery (see immediately above); dissolved before 1584?	Balie-macedan; Bally-macedan; Bally-magadain; Bally-vacadane	51°50′18″N 8°34′09″W
Ballynoe Monastery ^{~ø}		supposed monastic site — order and period unknown, suggested Knights Hospitaller (Note: Cork Historical and Archaeological Society, xxiv, p.129)	Baile-nua-na-sagart	51°59′31″N 8°03′39″W
Ballyvourney Abbey		Gaelic nuns founded 650 (6th or 7th century) by St Abban, for St Gobonate; possibly continuing after 1111; dissolved before 1172? Franciscan Friars, Third Order Regular	Ballvourney; Baile-Mhuirne; Baile-boirne	51°56′36″N 9°10′19″W
Bantry Friary		Franciscan Friars Minor, Conventual founded c.1460 (existing by 1466), 1307? (Note: Luke Wadding: Analecta Hibernica No.6, vol ii, p.156) 1320 (Note: Analecta Hibernica No.6, vol iii p.195)); Observant Franciscan Friars reformed 1482 by Fr David Hiarlaighy; Observant Franciscan Friars 1522-32; nominally suppressed 1541-2; friars reportedly expelled on several occasions (Note: Louis Augustin Alemand, Monasticum Hibernicum, translated and edited by John Stevens, 1722) by the English during the reign of Elizabeth I; demolished by Daniel O'Sullivan of Beare; refounded; dissolved 1580 and occupied by the English; O'Sullivan promised to rebuild house 1602	Beanntraighe; Bendtraigi	51°40′45″N 9°27′00″W (approx)
Bawnatemple Monastery		early monastic site, Gaelic monks (Note: Lord Killanin & M. V. Duignan, Shell Guide to Ireland, 1962, (new edition 1967) p.166)		51°53′14″N 8°52′22″W
Bridgetown Abbey		Augustinian Canons Regular — Victorine — from Newtown Trim and St Thomas, Dublin founded 1206-16 by Alexander Fitz Hugh; dissolved c.1545; obtained by Roger Pope of Grangegorman, surrendered to Sir Henry Sidney, Lord Deputy, 1576-7; held by Viscount of Fermoy 1588; granted to Ludovick Briskell 1595	St Mary ____________________; Bridge Town Priory; Baile-an-dorchid; Balindroghed; Balindregh; Pons Fermoy; Villa-Pontis	52°08′58″N 8°27′00″W
Brigown Monastery		early monastic site, Gaelic monks founded by 6th century? St Abban; possibly not continuing after 10th century; round tower fell 1720	Brigobann; Mitchelstown	52°15′40″N 8°16′07″W
Buttevant Friary		Franciscan Friars Minor, Conventual founded 1251 (Note: Annals of the Four Masters, ed. J. O'Donovan, 1848-51) (1276-9 (Note: Canice Mooney, OFM, Terminus; vol i, p.128) or 1290) by David Oge Barry (David de Barry), Lord Buttevant; nominally suppressed 1540; dissolved 1559 (during the reign of Elizabeth I); Observant Franciscan Friars refounded 1609-29; re-occupied from Restoration to after 1800; (NM)	Ecclesia Tumulorum; Bothon; Buton; Killenenagh; Killnamullagh; Botha-finn	52°13′54″N 8°40′09″W
Buttevant Nunnery		purported nunnery — evidence lacking	St Owen or St John the Baptist	
Carrigillihy Monastery ^{ø}, Myross parish		unknown or doubtful establishment, supposedly Cistercian monks; founded 1172 by Dermot MacCarthy, King of Desmond; dissolved; granted to Nicholas Walshe, in perpetuity c.1587; ruins erroneously attributed as Maure Abbey (Note: Charles Smith, MD, The ancient and present state of the county and city of Cork (1750), ed. 1815 i. p.263) (actually Abbeymahon)	Carigillihy; Curraghalicky; Abbey de Sancto Mauro	51°32′23″N 9°07′41″W
Castlecor ^{~}		supposed monastic site — order, foundation and period unknown; apparent abbey at Castle Corinth (Note: given in plea roll 30, K. Ed I)	Castle Corith	52°12′11″N 8°48′07″W
Castlelyons Friary		Carmelite Friars founded 1307-9 (1324) from within the de Barry family, (John de Barry (Note: James Ware, De Hibernia, et Antiquitatibus ejus, edition of 1654, p.198 - mistook order as Franciscans: cf E. B. Fitzmaurice & A. G. Little, Materials for History of the Franciscan Province of Ireland, 1920, p.90)), who had been granted license to alienate an area of land for a Carmelite friary 11 August 1309, but inhibited being without papal license; dissolved c.1541; granted to Viscount Barrymore 1568; restored by c.1737; now Castlemartyr	Castle Lyons; Castelio; Castleyhane; Castelleaghan; Castrileonensis	52°05′21″N 8°14′02″W
Castlemartyr Priory		Carmelite monks		51°54′36″N 8°03′31″W
Cecilstown ^{~}		supposed monastic site — order and period unknown		52°10′01″N 8°46′13″W
Clear Island Monastery		early monastic site, Gaelic monks founded by St Ciaran of Seirkieran	Inis-cleire; Traigh-Chiarain	51.4382262°N 9.5094395°W
Clogagh Friary ^{ø}		Franciscan Friars, Third Order Regular foundation called a 'little abbey', (Note: 17 K.James I: 'King's Collections', manuscripts compiled by Dr Madden, late 17th century, revised by Harris, NLI and TCD (Mervyn Achdall, Monasticon Hibernicum, 1786)) doubtful a community existed here	Cloggagh; Cloig-theach	51°40′29″N 8°48′01″W
Clonmeen Monastery ^{≈}		Augustinian Canons Regular founded by Mr O'Callaghan (the O'Callaghan family, (Note: Charles Smith, MD, The ancient and present state of the county and city of Cork (1750), edited 1815, i, p.294 - listed at Clonmine by Lubin) possible erroneous reference to Clonmines, County Wexford "site of monastery" (Note: Ordnance Survey)	Clonmere; Cluain-min; Clonmines (County Wexford)?; Clonmine?	52°08′16″N 8°51′54″W
Cloyne Cathedral Monastery and Nunnery		early monastic site, purported nunnery, (Note: Charles Smith, MD, The ancient and present state of the county and city of Cork (1750), edited 1815, i p.138) apparently erroneous reference to Killeedy (Cluainchreduil), County Limerick; founded 6th century by Colman mac Lenine; destroyed many times by Vikings;	St Ite ____________________; Cluain-uama; Cluain-vama; Killeedy (Cluainchreduil) (County Limerick)?	51°51′42″N 8°07′09″W
Coole Monastery		early monastic site, founded 6th century? by St Abban	Cuil-collingi; Cul-collingi; Cul-collainge; Cul-chuillinghe; Cilculen	
Coole Abbey		Franciscan Friars	Cuil-collingi; Cul-collingi; Cul-collainge; Cul-chuillinghe; Cilculen	52°06′33″N 8°12′14″W
Coole Preceptory		Knights Templar founded 1296 by a de Barry	Cuil-collingi; Cul-collingi; Cul-collainge; Cul-chuillinghe; Cilculen	
Conna Preceptory ^{ø}		purported Knights Hospitaller (Note: Cork Historical and Archaeological Society, xxxiv. p.129)		
Cork Augustinian Priory *		Augustinian Canons Regular built 1780; extant		51°53′53″N 8°28′33″W
Cork Monastery ^{#}		early monastic site, founded 600 by St Finbar (Bairre); site probably now occupied by St Finbarre's Cathedral	Corcagh; Corcaigh	51°53′40″N 8°28′49″W (probable)
Cork Hospital and Cell		Benedictine monks dependent on Waterford founded c.1191; united to Bath before 1204; dissolved 1536	Cell or hospital of St John the Evangelist, Cork	
Cork — St Sepulchre's Priory ^{ø}		Benedictine monks — held by St Nicholas's Priory, Exeter, sometime having a prior, though no community here		
Cork Priory		Benedictine?-Augustinian nuns founded 1297 on the wishes of Agnes de Hareford, on the findings of enquiry by John Wogan, Justiciar, on direction of the Crown; dissolved before 1540?	St John the Baptist	
Cork Augustinian Abbey		Augustinian Friars founded 14th/15th century before 1306 (Note: Cork Historical Journal, 61 (1956), earliest contemporary record, Will of John de Wynchedon, bequests to the friary and requesting burial in there)) (during the reign of Edward I (Note: James Ware, De Hibernia, et Antiquitatibus ejus, edition of 1654)) by Lord Kinsale; Observant Augustinian Friars 1472 to 1475 and 1484; dissolved 1540; granted to Cormac MacCarthy c.1576	The Abbey Church of the Most Holy Trinity ____________________; Red Abbey Tower	51°53′39″N 8°28′20″W
Cork Black Friary		Dominican Friars founded 1229 by Lord Philip de Barry; Observant Dominican Friars reformed 1484; dissolved 1540-1; granted to William Boureman 20 December 1543; bought by Brown and Goule; request by the Earl of Desmond to return the friary to the Dominicans 1557 - uncertain whether the Dominicans regained the friary from the purchasers; granted to Sir John King 1616; (subsequent history J. P. O'Heyne, O.P. Irish Dominicans (Epilogue Chronology ...), translated by A. Coleman, O.P., 1902, 1706 and A. Coleman, O.P., The Ancient Dominican Foundations of Ireland, 1902)	St Mary de Insula	
Cork - St. Mary's Dominican Church and Priory		Dominican Friars; Novitate extant	St Mary	
Cork — Gill Abbey		daughter house of Cong; founded 1136-7? by Cormac Mac Carthy; dissolved 1542-4; granted c.1590 to Cormac MacCarthy and Sir Richard Grenville; CI Church on site	St John the baptist (correctly St John the Evangelist) ____________________; Antro S. Finarri; Weem; Weym	51°53′38″N 8°29′35″W
Cork — St Stephen's Priory		founded before 1295; converted to the Blue-coat Hospital 1674		
Cork Grey Friary		Franciscan Friars Minor, Conventual founded 1214 by Dermot Mor MacCarthy Reagh; built c.1229-31, benefactors the de Barrys and Prendergasts; Observant Franciscan Friars reformed 1500; dissolved and abandoned 1540; granted to Andrew Skydy c.1565	St Mary's Shandon ____________________; Seandun; Shandon	
Cork Franciscan Friary *		founded 1609; extant		51°53′55″N 8°28′44″W
Cork Nunnery ^{~}		Benedictine (Note: William Dugdale, Monasticon Anglicanum, edited by Dodsworth & Dugdale, i, edition of 1682, ii edition of 1673 — possible reference to sisters at Benedictine hospital-cell) or Augustinian (Note: Dr. Cochrane (Cork Archaeological and Historical Society, xviii, p.124)) nuns license granted following petition by Agnes de Hareford, a recluse of Cork, and enquiry by John Wogan, Justiciar 1297, on the direction of the Crown; founded c.1327 by William de Barry who, with John de Barry, John FitzGilbert and Philip FitzRobert granted endowments to Agnes and others nuns; possibly on site later occupied by Market House	St John the Baptist	
Cork Nunnery ^{ø}		supposed Benedictine nuns		
Cork Preceptory		Knights Hospitaller (mistakenly given as Knights Templar (Note: Mervyn Archdall, Monasticon Hibernicum, 1768, p.68)) hospice rather than regular preceptory, founded before 1212, confirmed to the Hospitallers by Innocent III; built 1292; dissolved 16th century?; passed to the Crown	St John the Baptist ____________________; Sancti Johannis de Corcag	
Creggane Friary	supposed Franciscan Friars transferred from Timoleague, arising from a misreading		Crecan in Ibane; Cregane	
Cullen Monastery ^{ø}		purported Gaelic nuns, founded by St Laitrian (Lasair Fhiona) — ruins near a church held to have belonged to an ancient nunnery, (Note: Charles Smith, MD, The ancient and present state of the county and city of Cork (1750), edited 1815, i, p.294) latterly under erenaghs	Cuillenn Ui Chiuv	52°06′44″N 9°07′09″W (approx)
Dal Modula ^{~}		early monastic site, possibly located in County Cork		
Donaghmore Monastery		founded by St Fingene or St Laichtin (Lachtain) of Freshford; now parochial church	Donoughmore; Donnoughmore; Domnach-mor-mitaine	51°59′59″N 8°44′20″W (approx)
Fermoy Monastery ^{#?}		Cistercian monks — from Inishlounaght founded 1170 by Donal Mor O'Brien; dissolved 1542; granted to Tibold Roch, son of Viscount Roch, before 1570; granted to Sir Richard Grenville c.1590	Castrum Dei; M-fearmaighe; Armoy; Fearmaigh; Iormoy	52°08′15″N 8°16′54″W
Garinish Monastery		Gaelic nuns founded before c.530	Kilchuillin; Ilane-i-Cullin; Illnacullen	51°41′26″N 9°37′06″W
Glanworth Abbey		Dominican Friars founded 1475 (Note: Urban Flanagan, O.P.) (1227 (Note: Charles Smith, MD, The ancient and present state of the county and city of Cork (1750), edited 1815)) by the Roche family; officially suppressed February 1541, though apparently still in occupation during the reign of Elizabeth I; restored; dissolved c.1578, leased to three laymen; held by the Viscount of Fermoy 1588; subsequent history J. P. O'Heyne, O.P. Irish Dominicans, (Note: (Epilogue Chronology ...), translated by A. Coleman, O.P., 1902) 1706, T. de Burgo, Hibernica Dominicana, edition of 1762 and Daphne Pochin Mould, The Irish Dominicans, p. 126	Priory of the Holy Cross ____________________; Glenn-amhnach; Glenn-amain; Glanore	52.1882°N 8.3547°W
Goleen Friary		Franciscan Friars Minor, Conventual founded before 1442	Gahannyh Friary?	51°29′42″N 9°42′26″W
Gouganebarra Monastery		early monastic site, Gaelic monks founded 6th century, retreat of St Finbarre prior to his founding Cork	Gougane Barra; Gobhagnabarra	51°49′53″N 9°20′50″W
Inishcarra Monastery		early monastic site, Gaelic monks founded by St Senan, who left a community of disciples; dissolved	Iniscarra; Iniscara; Inis-cara by Lua; Tuaim-nava	51°54′30″N 8°39′15″W
Inishleena Monastery		Gaelic monks and nuns, reputedly founded by St Finbarre	Cellmagciun	51°54′25″N 8°42′04″W
Iniskieran Monastery		Franciscan friars founded 1460 by Florence Moar O'Driscoll	Clear Island Monastery	51°26′20″N 9°29′43″W
Kilbeacon Monastery		Gaelic monks; founded 650 by St Abban		
Kilcatherine Cell		Celtic nuns founded by St Caitiarn, niece of St Senan; double monastery	Cell Catigern; Cell-chatiern; Cell-chatigern	51°42′56″N 9°58′10″W
Kilcrea Friary		Observant Franciscan Friars founded 1465-78 (1470, (Note: James Ware, De Hibernia, et Antiquatibus ejus, edition of 1654) 1478, (Note: Harris's Table in Ware-Harris, Antiquities, 1745) (Note: Canice Mooney, O.F.M., Terminus, 1954, pp. 248–9)) by Cormac Mac Thady MacCarthy More, King of Desmond, Lord of Muskerry; officially suppressed 1542, friars remaining in occupancy under the protection of the MacCarthy family; dissolved 1577; granted on lease for 21 years to Sir Cormock MacCarthy (Cormac mac Teige MacCarthy), who left the Friars in occupancy; church plundered by English soldiers 1584; restored 1589 under Cormac mac Dermot MacCarthy; sacked 1599; restored 1604; dissolved 1614, fell into Protestant possession, friars expelled c.1614; damaged buildings repaired by Fr. John Gold, 1621; granted by Oliver Cromwell to Lord Broghill 1641; in trusteeship of Commissioners of Public Works 1892; (NM)	Cell-credhe; (cf. Kilkeary)	51°51′54″N 8°42′40″W
Kilcrea Nunnery		purportedly founded 6th century by St Cere		51°51′53″N 8°41′41″W approx
Kilcrumper Monastery		early monastic site, Gaelic monks, founded 6th century? by St Abban, probably on a site north of Ui Liathain; Benedictine monks; bestowed on Glascarrig 15th century	Cill Cruimthir; Ceallcruimthir	52°11′18″N 8°16′09″W
Kilkilleen Monastery ^{ø~}		supposed monastic site - order, foundation and period unknown — "Friary in ruins"		51°31′40″N 9°23′33″W
Killabraher Monastery ^{ø~}		supposed monastic site — order and period unknown		52°15′46″N 8°48′11″W
Killaconenagh Monastery		Gaelic nuns founded 6th century? by St Abban, after his founding Magee	Killachad conchean?; Killachadconchean	51°38′19″N 9°56′53″W
Killeenemer Monastery				
Kilmaclenine Monastery		early monastic site, Gaelic monks, probably founded before 606 by St Colman mac Leinin of Cloyne	Cell-mac-leinin	52°12′40″N 8°45′08″W (approx)
Kilmoney Priory		Augustinian Canons Regular cell, dependent on Gill Abbey founded ?; probably a vicarage after mid-14th century; dissolved before 1400(?); 'Abbey' site given in Memorial Atlas of Ireland 1901		51°47′53″N 8°24′16″W
Kilnamanagh Monastery		Gaelic nuns, foundation named for Ana, sister of St Caitiarn of Kilcatherine and niece of St Senan	Kilmana	51°37′55″N 10°02′55″W (approx)
Kilnamarbhan Monastery		early monastic site, founded 6th century? by St Abban		
Kilshanahan Monastery ^{ø~}		supposed monastic site — unknown order or foundation, "Ruined abbey and church" (Note: Memorial Atlas of Ireland, 1901)		52°02′07″N 8°19′18″W
Kinneigh Monastery		Gaelic monks founded by Colmán of Cloyne; possibly not surviving after 10th century	Cell-mor-Cinnech; Cell-mor-Ceanneich	51°46′02″N 8°59′23″W (approx)
Kinsale Friary ^{*}		Carmelite Friars founded 1334 (Note: Charles Smith, MD, The ancient and present state of the county and city of Cork (1750), edition of 1815, i, p.219) (during the reign of Edward III) by Robert fitz Richard Balrain; dissolved 1541 (1543); Queen Elizabeth I; rebuilt 2003-2006; extant	The Friary Church of the Blessed Virgin Mary; the Friary Church of Our Lady of Mount Carmel ____________________; Kinsale Abbey; Kynsalle; Cenn-saile	51°42′31″N 8°31′30″W
Kinsale Monastery		early monastic site, founded by St M'Eilte Ogh (M'eltioc)	St Gobban ____________________; Kynsalle; Cenn-saile	51°42′28″N 8°31′43″W (approx)
Labbamolaga Monastery		Gaelic monks founded 7th century by St Molaga of Timoleague, reputedly buried here	Leaba-molaga; Tampailin; Tulach-min-molaga?	52°18′03″N 8°20′30″W (approx)
Legan Abbey, Monkstown		Benedictine monks, daughter house of Waterford Priory dependent on Waterford and Bath; founded sometime before 1301 (after 1204); dissolved before 1350?	Liegane, in Monkstown	51°51′01″N 8°20′07″W
Loch-eire Monastery		early monastic site, purportedly founded by St Finbarr		
Lough Ine Monastery		probable early monastic site, Gaelic monks	Lough Hyne; Templebreedy	51°29′59″N 9°17′51″W
Lueim Monastery ^{ø}		supposed monastic site — order and foundation unknown; mentioned 1318 (Note: 'King's Collections', manuscripts compiled by Dr Madden, late 17th century, revised by Harris, NLI and TCD (as cited by Mervyn Archdall, Monasticon Hibernicum, 1786) p.74)		
Midleton Abbey ^{#}		Cistercian monks — from Monasteranenagh founded 1179/80, purportedly by the FitzGerald family (Note: Leopold Janauschek, Originum Cisterciensium, 1877) (or the Barry family (Note: Gasparis Jongelini, Notitia Abbatiarum ordines Cisterciensis per orbem universum, 1640 (Louis Augustin Alemand, Monasticum Hibernicum, translated and edited by John Stevens, 1722))); transferred from Monasteranenagh 1180; dissolved before 1573 (1543); abbot and convent remained as tenants after 1548; granted to John FitzEdmond FitzGerald 1573 and 1575; destroyed 19th century; Baptist church of St John reputedly occupies the site	The Abbey Church of Saint Mary of Chore ____________________ de Choro Sancti Benedicti; Castra-na-chore; Chorus S. Benedicti; Monasterore; Middleton; M-na-chore	51°54′49″N 8°10′28″W
Monanimy Commandery ^{ø}		purported Knights Templar	Monanimy Preceptory	
Mourne Abbey		(erroneously given as Knights Templar (Note: erroneous reference by Mervyn Archdall, Monasticon Hibernicum, 1786, p.75)) founded before 1216 (during the reign of King John) by Alexander de Sancta Helena; later, Knights Hospitaller	Mourne Preceptory; Ballynamona Preceptory; M-na-mona; Morne; Meny Nymone; Ballinemony	52°04′52″N 8°37′35″W
The Priory, Newmarket				52°12′56″N 8°59′52″W
Nohaval Monastery		early monastic site, Gaelic monks, reputedly founded by St Finian; formerly site of a round tower	Nuachongbhail; Nogoual	51°43′19″N 8°23′19″W (approx)
Nohavaldaly Monastery		early monastic site, Gaelic monks; reported stump of round tower (Note: Charles Smith, MD, The ancient and present state of the county and city of Cork (1750), edition of 1815, i, p.294)	St Finian ____________________; Nuachongbhail; Nohaval-daly	52°05′51″N 9°12′09″W
Omolaggie Monastery		early monastic site Augustinian Canons Regular possibly dependent on Cong		
Quchwill Abbey		abbey mentioned in 1355 (Note: 'King's Collections', manuscripts compiled by Dr Madden, late 17th century, revised by Harris, NLI and TCD (as cited by Mervyn Archdall, Monasticon Hibernicum, 1786), p.76) — probable reference Gill Abbey, or possibly Youghal		
Ross Priory		early monastic site, founded 590 by Saint Fachnan Mougach unconfirmed suggestion of Augustinian Canons Regular (Note: Dr Cochrane, Cork Historical and Archaeological Society, xviii, p.125); Benedictine monks dependent on St James, Wurzburg; founded before 1148?; reportedly ruinous by February 1541; dissolved 1541	The Priory Church of Saint Mary, Rosscarbery ____________________; Rosscarbery; Rosailithir; Ross-ailithir; Ruis-ailithir; Ross Carberry	51°34′36″N 9°01′59″W
Ross in Munster		Augustinian Friars, dubious supposed foundation in Ros Carbery		
Ross Friary		Franciscan Friars, dubious foundation (Note: tentative reference, Louis Augustin Alemand, Monasticum Hibernicum, translated and edited by John Stevens, 1722, pp.249, 266)		
Sherkin Friary		Observant Franciscan Friars founded 1460 by Florence O'Driscoll, Magnus (Note: Analecta Hibernica (Irish Manuscript Commission), No.6, Nov. 1934, ii, p.157) or 1470 by Dermit O'Driscoll, papal license granted 1449, at the petition of Fynin Ohedustoy (Fineen O'Driscoll), to found an Observant friary; though no reference to building before 1460 or 1462; dissolved: plundered and burnt 1537 (or 1538), friars removed to the mainland; rebuilt; 1578 restored; granted to John Bealing 1590; friars began to rebuild friary 1627; (NM)	Sherkin Island Abbey	51°28′34″N 9°23′59″W
Skeam West Monastery ^{ø}		possible early monastic site, Gaelic monks	Skream Island West	51°29′43″N 9°26′11″W
Spike Island Monastery^{ø~}		possible early monastic site, possibly located in County Cork or Carrig Island, County Kerry	Inispict; Inispuinc	
Spittle Bridge Monastery		Gaelic monks		52°12′10″N 8°16′30″W
Strawhall Monastery		early monastic site, Gaelic monks founded by St Aed mac Bricc of Killare	Kilbrenan; Enach-mid-brenin	51°49′08″N 8°47′31″W
Templefaughtna ^{ø~}		purported Knights Hospitaller — ruins of an old establishment (Note: John Cooke, Handbook for Travellers in Ireland, 1910, p.447)		51°34′38″N 8°59′51″W,
Timoleague Friary		Franciscan Friars founded 1240 by McCarthy Riabach or L William James Barry or c.1307-16 by Margery de Courci, wife of William Barry; built on the site of an earlier monastery; transferred from Cregan 1279; Observant Franciscan Friars reformed 1460; dissolved 1542, Friars in occupancy 1626 and 1641 dissolved; passed to Lord Inchiquin; (NM)	Timoleague Abbey; Tech-molaiga; Tech-molagga; Temolagi; Thatmelage; Thimolagi	51°38′31″N 8°45′53″W
Toames Monastery		Gaelic monks	Tuaim-muscraighe Monastery?	51°52′02″N 8°57′12″W
Tracton Abbey		Cistercian monks — from Whitland built 1224 by McCarthy; 1225, Cistercian chapter general approved petition from Odo de Barru 1222 and 1223 to found abbey; colonized 22 February 1225; suppressed 1540-1, though monks possibly remained; dissolved after 1541; granted to James Craig and Henry (Gylford (Guilford) 1568; Elizabeth I directed Henry Gylford to have 60-year lease 1568; assigned by Craig to the Earl of Cork	Albus tractus; Traghton	51°45′41″N 8°23′32″W
Tulach-min-Molaga ^{~}		early monastic site, founded 7th century by St Molagga of Timoleague and ann Beachaire, possibly located near Mitchelstown or Fermoy, probably Labbamolaga (supra)	?Labbamolaga	
Tullylease Abbey		early monastic site, founded by St Berechert, an Anglo-Saxon; Augustinian Canons Regular founded before 1170?, built by Mathew, son of Griffin; cell dependent on Kells Ossory after 1193; dissolved (?)	Tulach-leis; Tealach-leas; Tealach-lias; Tulales; Tullelash; Tollelyche; Tolleleyleyse	52°19′03″N 8°56′27″W
Weeme Priory		Augustinian Canons Regular extant 14th century		
Youghal — Carmelite Friary		post-Reformation foundation purportedly established in the ruins of an earlier Carmelite 'abbey' (Note: no name similar to Youghal listed either in Fonds Grand Carmes or Arch. Ord. Rome (Carmelite Order), Manuscripts. II, C.O. II. 26, p.13, written 1739-59)		
Youghal — Dominican Friary (North Abbey)		Dominican Friars founded 1268 (1271 (Note: Clyn)) by Thomas fitz Maurice; built 1268 by Maurice, descendant of Lord Offaly; Regular Observant Dominican Friars reformed 1493; dissolved c.1543; granted in perpetuity to William Walshe c.1580; friars probably expelled 1583; granted to John Thickpenny, a soldier, 1584; granted, in the occupation of Thickpenny's widow, to Sir Walter Raleigh, 1587, whereupon the buildings were destroyed, the friars remaining in or near the town	Holy Cross Priory; Our Lady of Graces Priory; ____________________; Eochaille; Araill; Iochil; Yoghill; Youghuld	51°57′27″N 7°51′15″W
Youghal — Franciscan Friary (South Abbey)		Franciscan Friars built 1224 by Maurice Fitzgerald, Lord Chief Justice of Ireland; Observant Franciscan Friars reformed 1460; dissolved 1541-2: church and cloister demolished, convent withdrew to Curraheen, County Waterford; friars apparently returned soon afterwards, with Coraheen retained for use as a refuge in emergency; dissolved 1583, friars expelled or killed and buildings destroyed by English Protestants; abandoned until another house established 1627 (see immediately below)		51°56′56″N 7°50′33″W
Youghal — Franciscan Friary, later site		Franciscan Friars founded 1627 in succession to site abandoned (see immediately above)		
Youghal Priory		Benedictine monks cell, hospital or Maison Dieu, dependent on Waterford and Bath; founded 1185 before 1306; dissolved 1536?	St John's House	51°57′24″N 7°51′05″W
Youghal Nunnery		assumed to have been Franciscan? nuns, possibly St Clare (Franciscan Second Order); convent possibly founded during the reign of Henry II; priory founded before 1385; dissolved 1542 St Anne		
Youghill in Munster Friary		Augustinian Friars possibly founded c.1643	Youghal	

== Map link to lists of monastic houses in Ireland by county ==
Click on a county to go to the corresponding article.	Antrim; Armagh; Down; Fermanagh; Londonderry; Tyrone; Carlow; Cavan; Clare; Cork; Donegal; Dublin; Galway; Kerry; Kildare; Kilkenny; Laois; Leitrim; Limerick; Longford; Louth; Mayo; Meath; Monaghan; Offaly; Roscommon; Sligo; Tipperary; Waterford; Westmeath; Wexford; Wicklow

== See also ==
- List of monastic houses in Ireland
