= 1236 in Ireland =

- Centuries: 11th; 12th; 13th; 14th; 15th
- Decades: 1210s; 1220s; 1230s; 1240s; 1250s
- See also: Other events of 1236; List of years in Ireland

Events from the year 1236 in Ireland.

== Incumbent ==
- Lord: Henry III
- King of Connacht: Felim mac Cathal Crobderg Ua Conchobair
- King of Thomond: Donnchadh Cairbreach Ó Briain
