= 1226 in Ireland =

- Centuries: 11th; 12th; 13th; 14th; 15th
- Decades: 1200s; 1210s; 1220s; 1230s; 1240s
- See also: Other events of 1226; List of years in Ireland

Events from the year 1226 in Ireland.

== Incumbent ==
- Lord: Henry III

== Events ==
- Castle built at Castleisland, County Kerry, by Geoffrey Maurice (or de Marisco), Lord Justice of Ireland.

== Deaths ==
- Walter de Riddlesford, Norman lord with lands in County Wicklow and County Kildare.
- Nuala Ní Conchobair, Queen of Ulaid.
