= 1227 in Ireland =

- Centuries: 11th; 12th; 13th; 14th; 15th
- Decades: 1200s; 1210s; 1220s; 1230s; 1240s
- See also: Other events of 1227; List of years in Ireland

Events from the year 1227 in Ireland.

== Incumbent ==
- Lord: Henry III

== Events ==
The port of New Ross granted trading concessions from Henry III.

== Deaths ==
- Luke Netterville (Lucas de Nutrevilla), an Anglo-Norman churchman and archbishop of Armagh
