= 1224 in Ireland =

- Centuries: 11th; 12th; 13th; 14th; 15th
- Decades: 1200s; 1210s; 1220s; 1230s; 1240s
- See also: Other events of 1224; List of years in Ireland

Events from the year 1224 in Ireland.

== Incumbent ==
- Lord: Henry III

== Events ==
- Richard Mór de Burgh claims the title Lord of Connaught on the basis of a grant to his father, and that Aedh Ua Conchobair (successor to his father Cathal Crobhdearg Ua Conchobair, King of Connacht) has forfeited it.
- Dominican Order set up in Ireland. They are the first mendicant friars in Ireland. At about this date, Lucas de Netterville, Archbishop of Armagh, founds a Dominican friary in Drogheda.
- South Abbey, Youghal, the proto-friary of the Irish Province of the Observant Franciscans, is founded by Maurice FitzGerald, 2nd Lord of Offaly, dedicated to St. Nicholas.
- Annals of Connacht begin.

== Deaths ==
- Cú Ceanain Ó Con Ceanainn, King of Uí Díarmata.
- Cathal Crobhdearg Ua Conchobair, last independent King of Connacht (born 1153).
- Muirghis Cananach Ua Conchobhair, Prince of Connacht, monk and poet.
- Donnchadh Mor O Dalaigh, poet.
- Gilla na Naemh Crom Ó Seachnasaigh, Lord of Cenél Áeda na hEchtge.
- Simon Rochfort, Bishop of Meath.
