= 1223 in Ireland =

- Centuries: 11th; 12th; 13th; 14th; 15th
- Decades: 1200s; 1210s; 1220s; 1230s; 1240s
- See also: Other events of 1223; List of years in Ireland

Events from the year 1223 in Ireland.

== Incumbent ==
- Lord: Henry III

== Events ==
- 2 February – End of the 5 month-long precipitation in Ireland According to the Annals of Loch Cé.

=== Full dates unknown ===
- Miles de Courcy was granted the territories of Kingsale and Ringrone by Henry III of England.
- Baron Kerry was established, with Thomas Fitzmaurice being the first baron.
- The current Old Head of Kinsale was constructed.

== Deaths ==
- Albin O'Molloy, Irish bishop (birth year unknown)
- Máel Ísa Ua Conchobair, Irish prince (birth year unknown)
