= Rincrew Abbey =

Ruined abbey in Youghal, Ireland

Coordinates: 51.98°N 7.869°W

Rincrew Abbey is a ruined abbey, traditionally associated with the Knights Templar, near Youghal in the south of Ireland. It is located in County Cork.

== History ==
Rincrew Abbey was built by the Knights Templar, later turned over to the Hospitallers Order of St John.

== Location ==
The ruins of the abbey stand on a hill overlooking the River Blackwater north of Youghal. The ruins are situated on a private farm and have no public access.

== See also ==
- List of abbeys and priories in Ireland (County Waterford)
- Molana Abbey
- Youghal Priory
- North Abbey, Youghal
- South Abbey, Youghal
