= 1225 in Ireland =

- Centuries: 11th; 12th; 13th; 14th; 15th
- Decades: 1200s; 1210s; 1220s; 1230s; 1240s
- See also: Other events of 1225; List of years in Ireland

Events from the year 1225 in Ireland.

== Incumbent ==
- Lord: Henry III

== Events ==
- Dominican Order founds the 'Black Abbey', lying just off Parliament Street in Kilkenny.
