= Molana Abbey =

Ruined Augustinian abbey in Waterford, Ireland

Coordinates: 51°59′50″N 7°53′00″W

- Mainistir Mhaolanfaidh
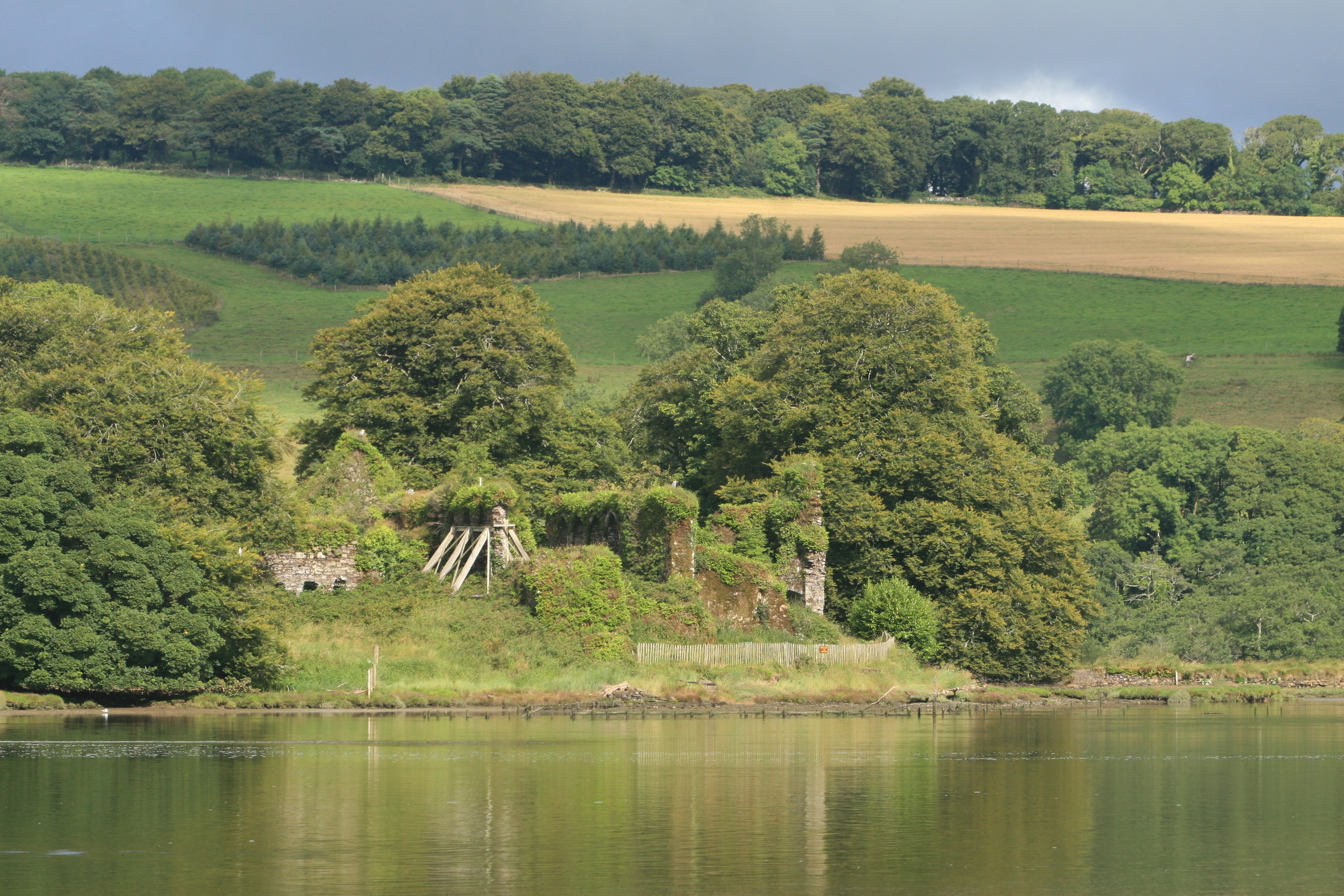
- The ruins of Molana Abbey pictured from the eastern bank of the River Blackwater
- Interactive map of Molana Abbey

Monastery information
- Order: Augustinians
- Diocese: Waterford and Lismore

Architecture
- Status: Inactive

Site
- Public access: Yes

Molana Abbey (Irish: Mainistir Mhaolanfaidh) is a 6th-century Abbey located on the south coast of Ireland in the Diocese of Waterford and Lismore, near Youghal. The abbey lies on an island in the River Blackwater. The monks of the monastery helped co-edit Collectio canonum Hibernensis in the 8th century. It came under the control of the Augustinian canons in the 12th century before being seized by the English Crown during the Reformation and gradually falling into ruin.

== Name of the monastery ==
The Irish name for the island is Dairinis, which can be translated as "Oak Island". Early Middle Ages text sources also use this name for the abbey. However, since there was another monastery island of that name in Wexford, the name of the founder, Máel Anfaid, was added to differentiate between the two. In later centuries, the old Irish name was dropped and only the founder's name was used. This name was later anglicised to Molana.

== Geographic location ==
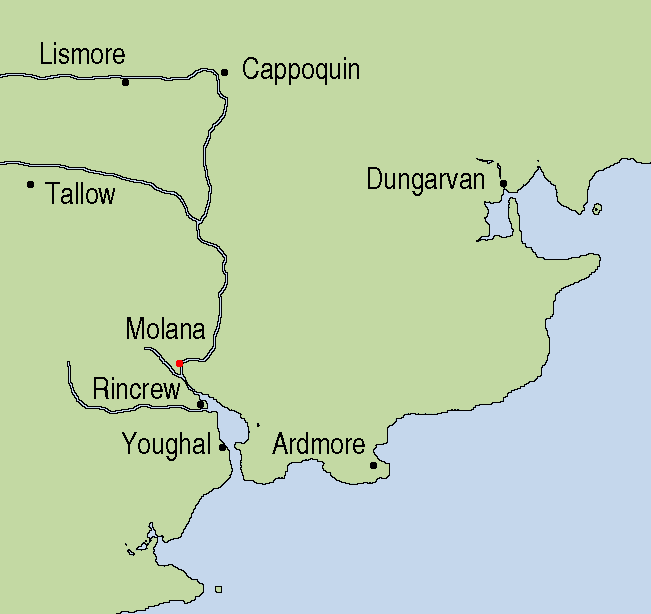
The location of Molana Abbey

The monastery is located on a former river island in the Blackwater River but was connected to the mainland in 1806 by the construction of two dams on the west side of the mainland. The site is only a few kilometers from the river mouth and the natural port of Youghal on the south coast of Ireland. Access to waterways in the early Middle Ages was of great importance as it gave easy access to travel between monasteries in Ireland and in Britain. According to some traditions, it is known that a sea voyage in the early Christian period between the Southern coast of Ireland and Brittany could be completed in three days and nights.

== History ==
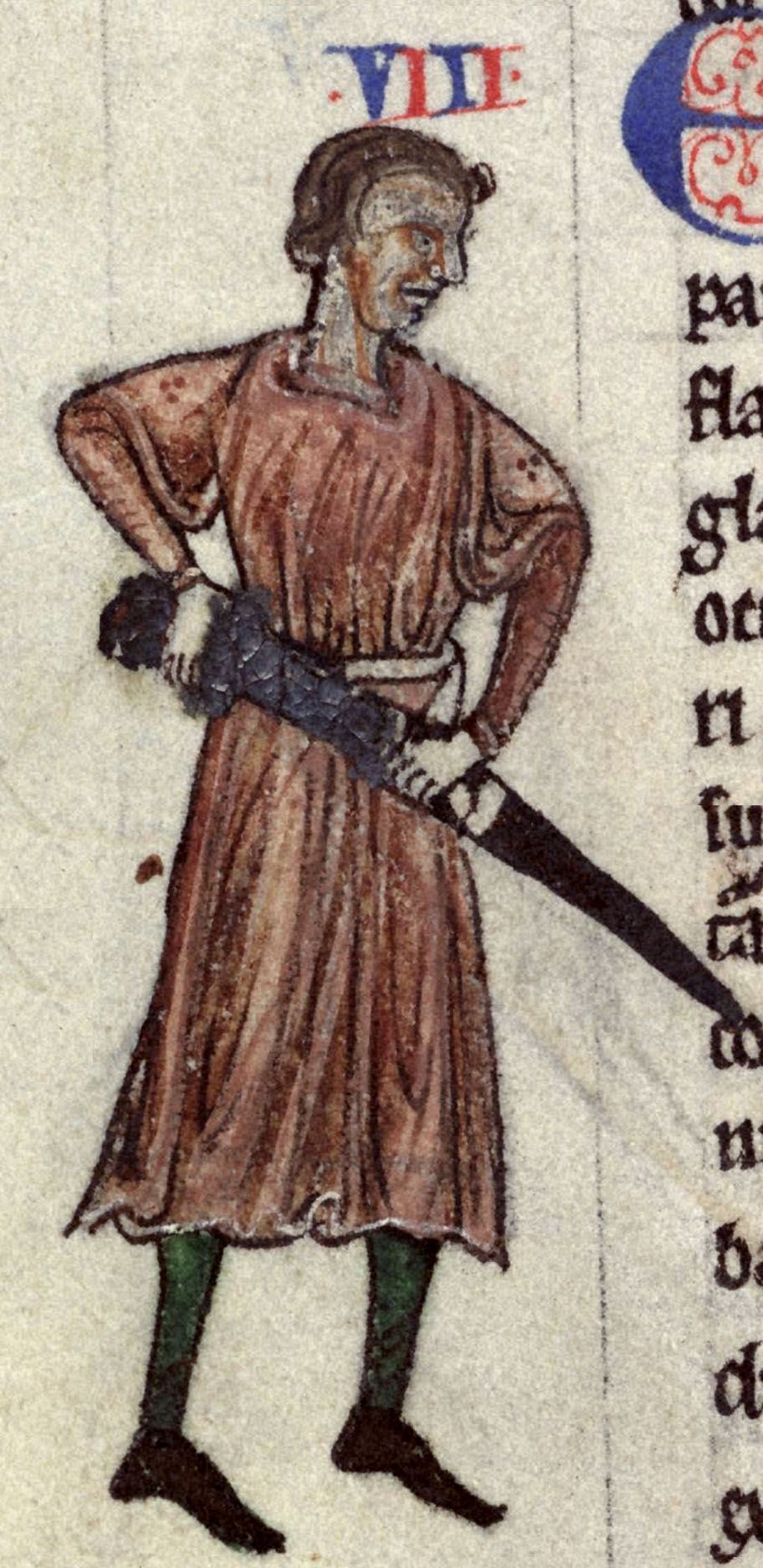
The 12th-century Norman military commander Raymond FitzGerald, who regularly visited and is buried in the monastery, from a manuscript of the Expugnatio Hibernica

A disciple of St. Carthage, called Máel Anfaid, founded the monastery on an island called Dair Inis on the River Blackwater in the sixth century. Little is known of the founder, but it is thought he could have lived to at least 608 AD. The early monastery was recorded as having an extensive library including Greek Vulgate and African councils resolutions. Although it can also be assumed that, as with many other Irish monasteries, Molana was a victim of raids by Vikings, no such records of any attacks have survived. In particular, the prominent location near the mouth of the River Blackwater makes the chances of an attack even likelier.

Following the Norman Invasion of Ireland in 1169, the monks befriended Raymond Fitzgerald, who was one of the Norman commanders of the invasion. FitzGerald provided support to the monastery, and it is thought he was buried there some time between 1185 and 1198. Molana was refounded as a house of Augustinian canons in the 12th century and was extensively rebuilt in the 13th century. By 1462, the monastery was reported to still have a large number of canons caring for the poor and sick, despite it being in poor structural condition. Later, in 1475, it was reported that the priory was still impoverished but continuing to function.

During the Reformation all religious houses in the territory of Henry VIII were dissolved and examined (see Dissolution of the monasteries). The Crown report compiled in 1541 stated the monastery consisted of a church, cloister and all that was necessary for the operation of agriculture, including 380 acres of land, three fish weirs for catching salmon and a water mill. The property had an estimated value of 26 pounds and 15 shillings. On 21 December 1550, ownership of the monastery as a fief fell to James FitzGerald, 14th Earl of Desmond. The Earl allowed continuation of the monastic life but the Desmond Rebellions caused the monastery to be re-seized by the English Crown, whose soldiers desecrated the church and burned a portrait of the monastery's founder when they visited the island in 1580.

By 1600, the monastery was abandoned and already overgrown with so much ivy that it was nearly impossible to examine the architectural features. Gradually the buildings fell further into ruin. The land and ruins were owned by Richard Boyle, 3rd Earl of Burlington up to the mid-eighteenth century, when it passed to the Smyth family who built a nearby manor named Ballynatray House complete with a surrounding park in 1795. To integrate the ruins of the monastery into the park, two dams were built in 1806, which since then connect the island to the mainland. The monastery and its associated manor were later sold several times and are still in private ownership to this day. The grounds of Ballynatray House are open to the public for a few hours on certain days of the week.

== Architecture ==
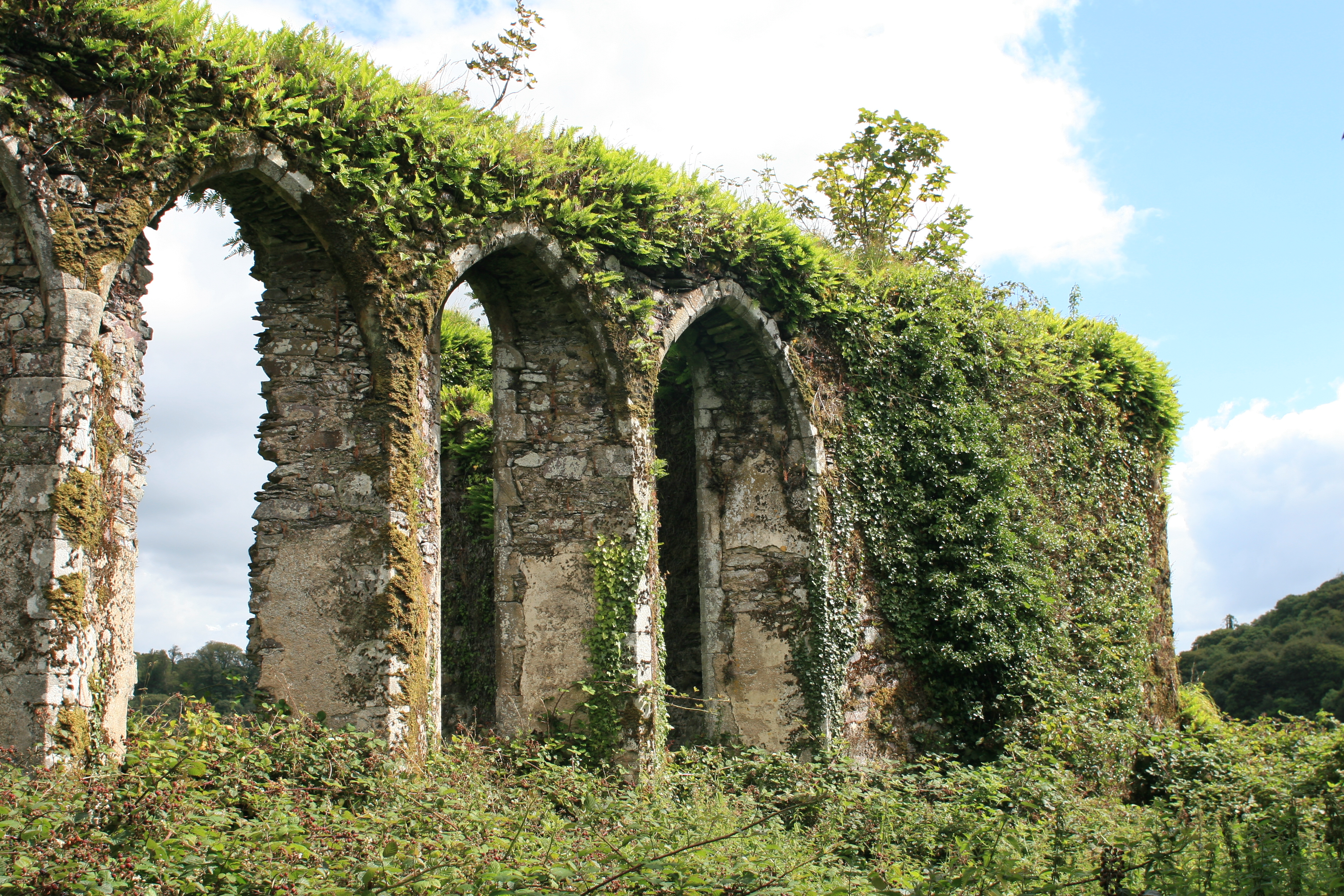
Pointed Windows on the north side of the choir, constructed in the 13th century early English style

Not much is known about the buildings from the early Christian era. In general, it can be assumed that in Ireland at the time, the nearest building materials were used. The name of the island would suggest that oak trees were widely available locally, so the early monastery was probably constructed of oak timber. Only later, but well before the Anglo-Norman invasion in the 12th century, were churches being widely constructed using stone. The nave of the monastery's church dates back to this time, just before the invasion and is 17.07m in length and 7.47m in width. It is typical for this time period of construction, the preferred method was the use of fairly large stones if possible, which were carefully selected and arranged so that a relatively high degree of accuracy was achieved.

All other preserved buildings were erected in the 13th century with some later additions. The choir windows are 4.57 m high, 2.08 m wide and narrow outwards to 0.56 m. With six southern chancel windows, a large east window and four northern chancel windows, the choir area would have been very full of light. In comparison, the old nave must have been dark. The east wing was two storeys. The ground floor shut immediately to the choir vestry. Further south was followed by other areas with the chapter house and the staircase that gave access to the dormitory on the top floor. The chapter house had three-part window with a height of 1.68 m and an inner width of 1.37 m.

The refectory was 21.49 m in length and 6.17 m in width, which took up the entire southern wing. Large parts of the southern wall are collapsed today. However, a section with a window of the early English style was preserved on the south side, and equipped with an arched window, which apparently served as a lectern. Together with the two windows in the west gable, the room was well supplied with good light.

Some structural changes can be attributed to the activities of the Smyth family at the beginning of the 19th century. These include a pointed arch entrance on the north side of the old church hall, a historically incorrect statue of the founder Máel Anfaid as an Augustinian Canons Regular and a memorial plaque on the east pediment of the refectory which claims to be the burial place of Raymond Fitzgerald although it is thought he was buried elsewhere in the monastery.

== See also ==
- List of abbeys and priories in Ireland (County Cork)
- Rincrew Abbey
- Youghal
- Youghal Priory
- North Abbey, Youghal
- South Abbey, Youghal
