= 1221 in Ireland =

- Centuries: 11th; 12th; 13th; 14th; 15th
- Decades: 1200s; 1210s; 1220s; 1230s; 1240s
- See also: Other events of 1221; List of years in Ireland

Events from the year 1221 in Ireland.

== Incumbent ==
- Lord: Henry III

== Deaths ==
- Maelruanaidh Ó Dubhda, King of Uí Fiachrach Muaidhe
