= Raymond FitzGerald =

12th century Cambro-Norman commander

Raymond "Le Gros" FitzGerald
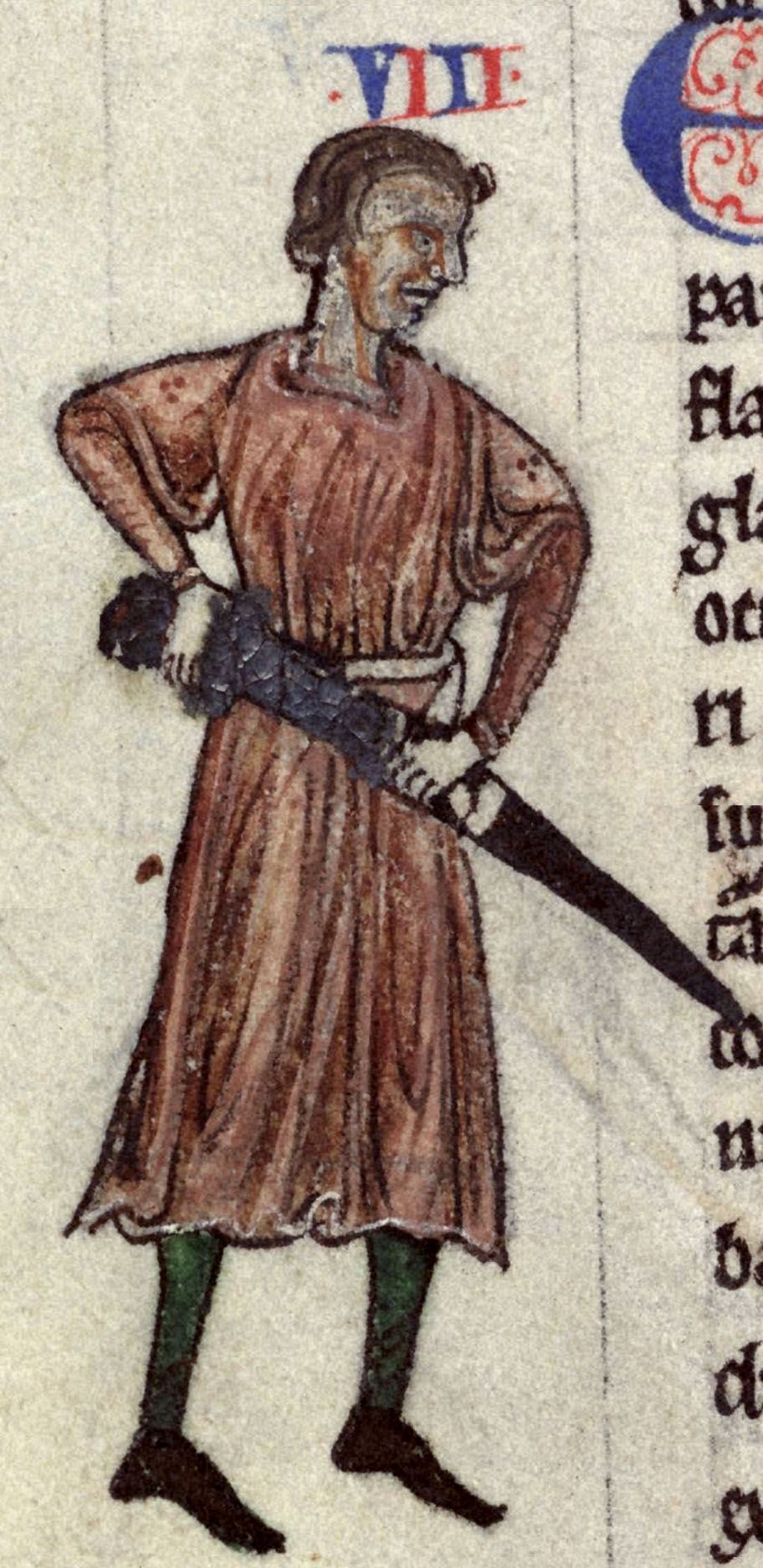
- Raymond le Gros in a 13th-century manuscript, MS 700 of the National Library of Ireland, illustrating the text of the Expugnatio Hibernica, written by Gerald of Wales, a cousin of Raymond.
- Born: Wales
- Died: Between 1185 and 1198; County Waterford, Ireland
- Resting place: Molana Abbey, County Waterford; 51°59′50″N 7°53′00″W
- Other names: Redmond
- Spouse: Basilia de Clare

Raymond (or Redmond) Fitz William Fitz Gerald (died 1185–1198), nicknamed Le Gros ("the Large"), was a Cambro-Norman commander during the Norman invasion of Ireland. Raymond was among the first of a small band of Norman knights who landed on the South coast of Ireland before being reinforced by a larger force led by Richard de Clare, 2nd Earl of Pembroke. He was active consolidating Norman rule over Ireland before he retired to his estates in County Waterford where he died in the late 12th century.

== Family and youth ==
Raymond grew up in Wales, and was a grandson of Princess Nest ferch Rhys, daughter of Rhys ap Tewdwr, the last independent Prince of South Wales. His father was William FitzGerald, Lord of Carew.

== Career ==
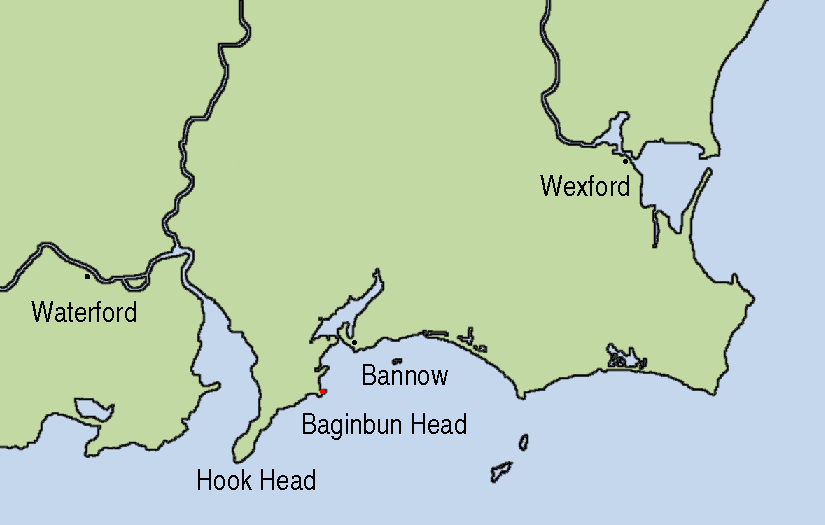
On 1 May 1170 Raymond landed at Baginbun Head, a promontory fort which was easily defendable.

He was sent by Strongbow to Ireland in 1170, and landed at Baginbun Head at the Hook Peninsula, near Waterford, where he was besieged in his entrenchments by the combined Irish and Ostmen, whom he repulsed. Although vastly outnumbered in this battle, (his cousin Gerald of Wales gives the numbers at 3000 Irish against Le Gros's forces of about 100 including 10 Knights) he won a resounding victory which he achieved by rounding up a nearby herd of cattle which his men had foraged and driving them headlong into the oncoming enemy ranks. The result was that about 1000 of the combined Galic and Hiberno-Norse force were either killed or captured.

He was Strongbow's second in command and had the chief share both in the capture of Waterford and in the successful assault on Dublin. He was sent to Aquitaine to hand over Strongbow's conquests to Henry II of England, but was back in Dublin in July 1171, when he led one of the sallies from the town. Strongbow later offended him when he refused to allow to marry his sister Basilia de Clare who was the widow of Robert de Quincy. After that Raymond moved to Wales and Hervey de Mountmaurice became constable in his place.

At the outbreak of a general rebellion against the earl in 1174, Raymond returned with his uncle Meiler FitzHenry, after receiving a promise of marriage with Basilia. He brought about 450 men with him and relieved Strongbow who was under siege in Waterford. His marriage to Basilia finally took place in Wexford directly following this encounter. Reinstated as constable, he secured a series of successes including the capture of Limerick city in October 1175. Mountmaurice meanwhile obtained Raymond's recall on the ground that his power threatened the royal authority, but the constable was delayed by a fresh outbreak at Limerick, the earl's troops refusing to march without him. On the death of Strongbow, he acted as governor until the arrival of William FitzAldelm, to whom he handed over the royal fortresses. He was deprived of his estates near Dublin and Wexford, but the Geraldines secured the recall of FitzAldelm early in 1183, and regained their power and influence. In 1182 he relieved his half-uncle Robert Fitz-Stephen, who was besieged in Cork. In 1185, his first cousin Philip de Barry, son of William FitzOdo de Barry came to Ireland to assist in the recovery of some cantreds in the Kingdom of Desmond.

== Death and legacy ==
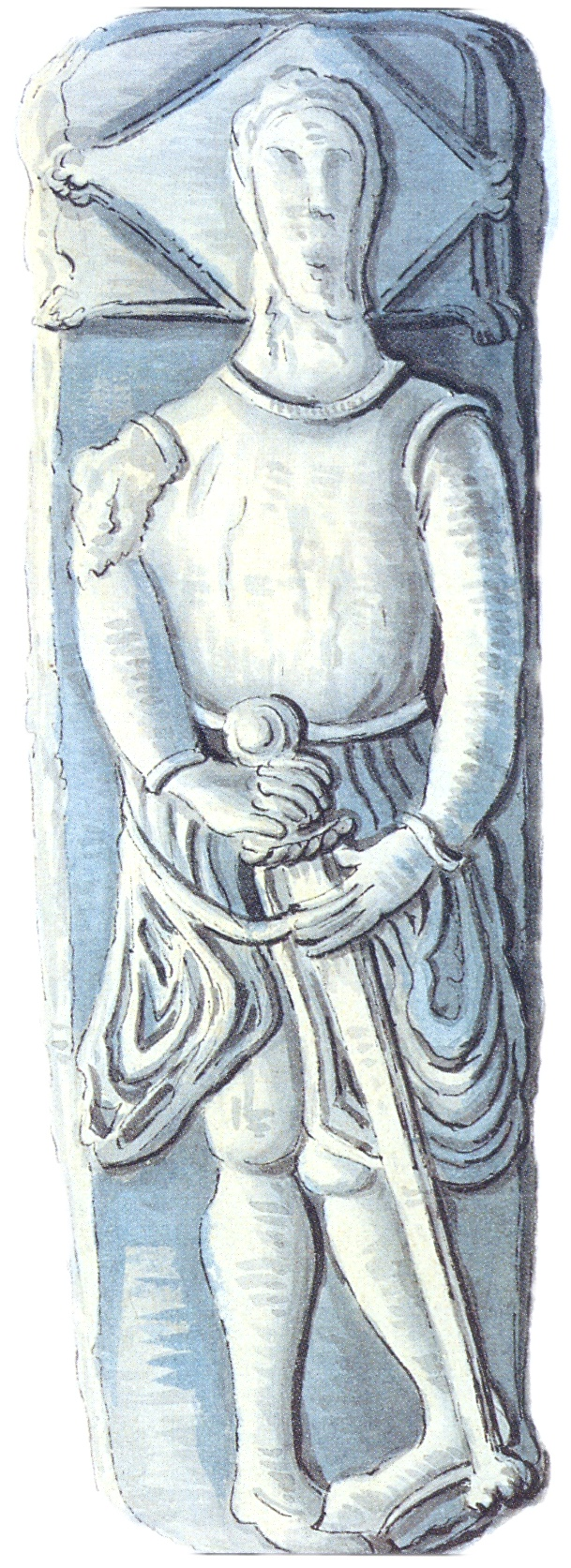
14th century tomb effigy of Raymond le Gros at Molana Abbey, now lost, as drawn by Daniel Grose (1766–1838)

The time of his death is not certain. He was certainly alive when John of England came to Ireland in 1185. Gerald of Wales did not record his death in his Expugnatio Hibernica which was finished in 1189. His widow Basilia married Geoffrey FitzRobert at some time between 1198 and 1201. According to tradition he was buried in Molana Abbey. He is described by Giraldus Cambrensis as
"very stout, and a little above the middle height; his hair was yellow and curly, and he had large, grey round eyes. His nose was rather prominent, his countenance high-coloured, cheerful, and pleasant; and, although he was somewhat corpulent, he was so lively and active that the incumbrance was not a blemish or inconvenience. Such was his care of his troops that he passed whole nights without sleep, going the rounds of the guards himself, and challenging the sentinels to keep them on the alert. . . He was prudent and temperate, not effeminate in either his food or his dress. He was a liberal, kind, and circumspect man; and although a daring soldier and consummate general, even in military affairs prudence was his highest quality."
Raymond is considered the soldier, whereas Strongbow was the statesman, of the conquest.

Raymond is also remembered in song. The song contains a detailed hymn, and stylized him a hero:

Dirrai vus de un Chevaler,
Reymund le Gros l'oï nomer.
Barun esteit icIL vaillant,
Vassal hardi e conquerant.
Asez ert riches Manant e
E le plus puissant de ses pers.
Conestable est Reymun
De la Leynestere regïun.
Chevalers retint e bone gent
par le commandement Cunte.
Chevalers tint e souders,
Archers, serjanz e poigners,
Pur mettre a hunte ea Bellei
De Yrlande les enemis le rei.

Translated: I will tell you of a knight, named Raymond le Gros. He was a brave Baron, a brave and victorious follower. He was very rich and powerful, counting the mightiest to its peers. Raymond Constable is the region of Leinster. He holds the knights and good men under the command of Count. He recruited soldiers and knights, archers, infantry and mercenaries to hunt the king's enemies in Ireland and to shame.

== Ancestry ==
Ancestors of Raymond FitzGerald

Walter FitzOtho, Constable of Windsor Castle
Gerald de Windsor, Constable of Pembroke Castle
Beatrice
William FitzGerald de Carew
Rhys ap Tewdwr of the House of Dinefwr, King of Deheubarth
Nest ferch Rhys, Princess of Deheubarth
Gwladys ferch Rhiwallon ap Cynfyn of Powys
Raymond FitzGerald
