= 1228 in Ireland =

- Centuries: 11th; 12th; 13th; 14th; 15th
- Decades: 1200s; 1210s; 1220s; 1230s; 1240s
- See also: Other events of 1228; List of years in Ireland

Events from the year 1228 in Ireland.

== Incumbent ==
- Lord: Henry III

== Deaths ==
- Henry de Loundres, an Anglo-Norman churchman who was Archbishop of Dublin, from 1213 to 1228.
