= 1229 in Ireland =

- Centuries: 11th; 12th; 13th; 14th; 15th
- Decades: 1200s; 1210s; 1220s; 1230s; 1240s
- See also: Other events of 1229; List of years in Ireland

Events from the year 1229 in Ireland.

== Incumbent ==
- Lord: Henry III

== Events ==
- Philip de Barry founded Ballybeg Priory for the Canons Regular of St Augustine.
- Shankill Castle built by Archbishop Henry de Loundres on the site of the ancient Shankill church.
- June 15 - Henry III assigns Dublin the right to elect a mayor annually

== Deaths ==
Gilla an Choimded Ó Duillénnáin, a cleric.
