= 1233 in Ireland =

- Centuries: 11th; 12th; 13th; 14th; 15th
- Decades: 1210s; 1220s; 1230s; 1240s; 1250s
- See also: Other events of 1233; List of years in Ireland

Events from the year 1233 in Ireland.

== Incumbent ==
- Lord: Henry III

== Events ==
A fragment of that Holy rood was brought to Holy Cross Abbey, County Tipperary by the Plantagenet Queen-mother, Isabella of Angoulême, around 1233.
