= Magdalene Tower, Drogheda =

Magdalene Tower
- Dominican Friary
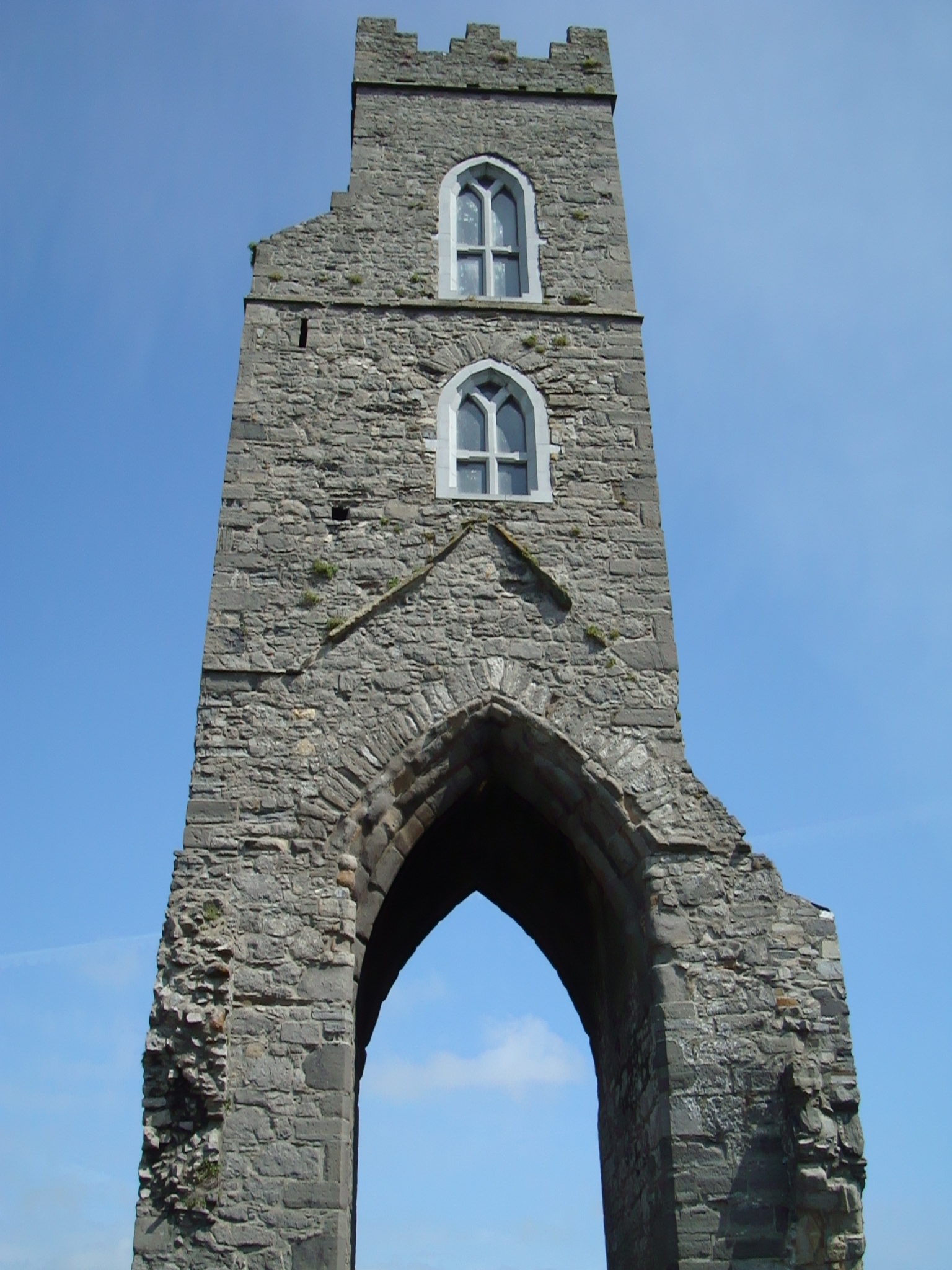

- Location within Ireland

General information
- Architectural style: Gothic
- Location: Rope Walk, Magdalene Street., Drogheda, Ireland
- Coordinates: 53.7181°N 6.3509°W
- Construction started: 13th Century CE

Website
- Magdalene Tower

Magdalene Tower is a landmark located at the highest point of the northern part of Drogheda, County Louth, in Ireland. All that now remains of the once important Dominican Friary is the belfry tower. Lucas de Netterville, then Archbishop of Armagh, founded the monastery in about 1224.

The tower itself is of 14th-century construction. It springs from a fine Gothic Arch, above which there are two further stories connected by a spiral staircase. The importance of this friary is signified by the fact that it was here that O'Donnell, O'Hanlon, McMahon, O'Neill and the other Ulster chiefs acknowledged their submission to Richard II of England, at the end of the 14th-century. The English novelist William Makepeace Thackery, who visited the Magdalene tower in 1842, described a manuscript at the British Museum 'which shows these yellow mantled warriors riding down to the King, splendid in his forked beard, peaked shoes, and long dangling scalloped sleeves down to the ground. They flung their skenes or daggers at his feet, and knelt to him and were wonder-stricken by the richness of his tents and the garments of his knights and ladies'. In 1412 its Abbot, Father Bennett, was the peacemaker in the conflict between the people on either side of the River Boyne leading to the uniting of Drogheda. In 1467 Thomas Earl of Desmond also conventionally called "Thomas of Drogheda" was beheaded on the 'north commons of Drogheda' for treason against the King. He had passed an Act setting up a university at Drogheda, but the project died along with him.

The battlements of the tower were badly damaged by Cromwell's cannon during the siege of 1649.

The tower was located near to the now-demolished St Sunday's Gate and was located just inside the northern walls of the town. The religious life of Drogheda was utterly transformed by the measures taken to progress the Reformation in Ireland. The great abbeys, priories and hospitals all disappeared and their lands were taken by the Crown.

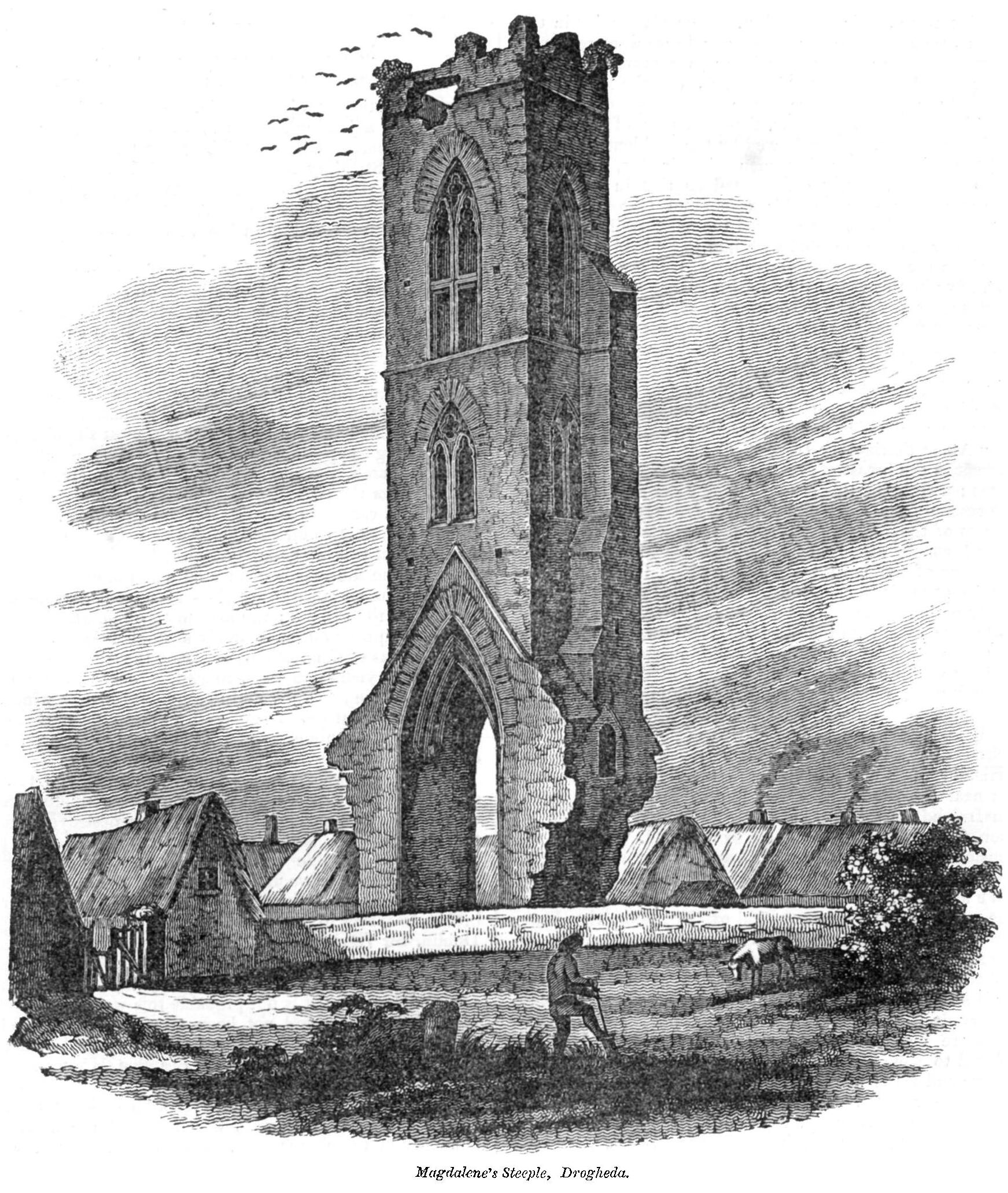
1832

== See also ==
- List of abbeys and priories in Ireland (County Louth)
