= 1230 in Ireland =

- Centuries: 11th; 12th; 13th; 14th; 15th
- Decades: 1210s; 1220s; 1230s; 1240s; 1250s
- See also: Other events of 1230; List of years in Ireland

Events from the year 1230 in Ireland.

== Incumbent ==
- Lord: Henry III

== Events ==
- First records of the Franciscan Order in Ireland.

== Births ==
- Walter de Burgh, 1st Earl of Ulster
