= North Abbey, Youghal =

Ruined Dominican monastery in County Cork, Ireland

- An Mainistir Thuaidh
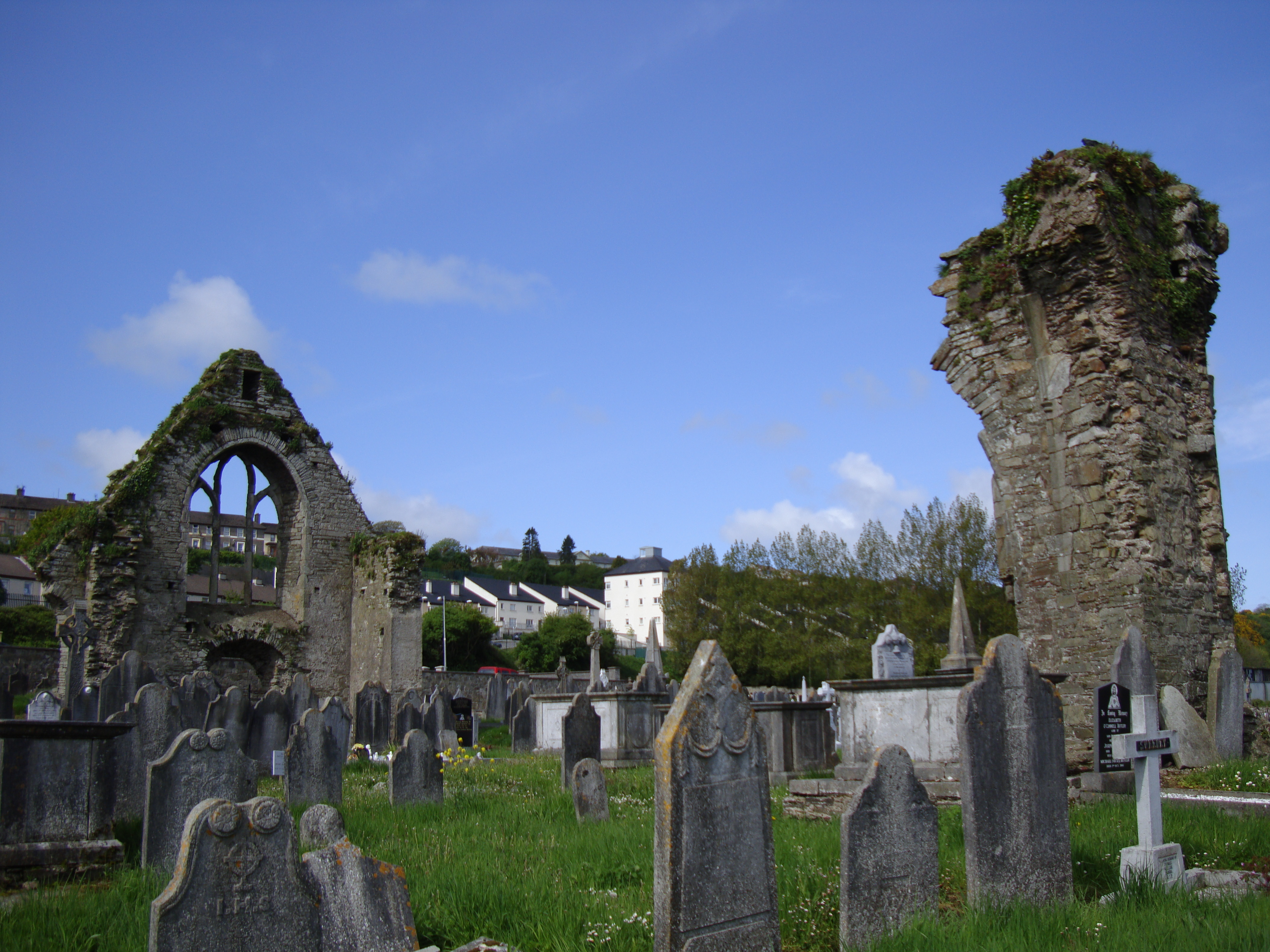
- Ruins

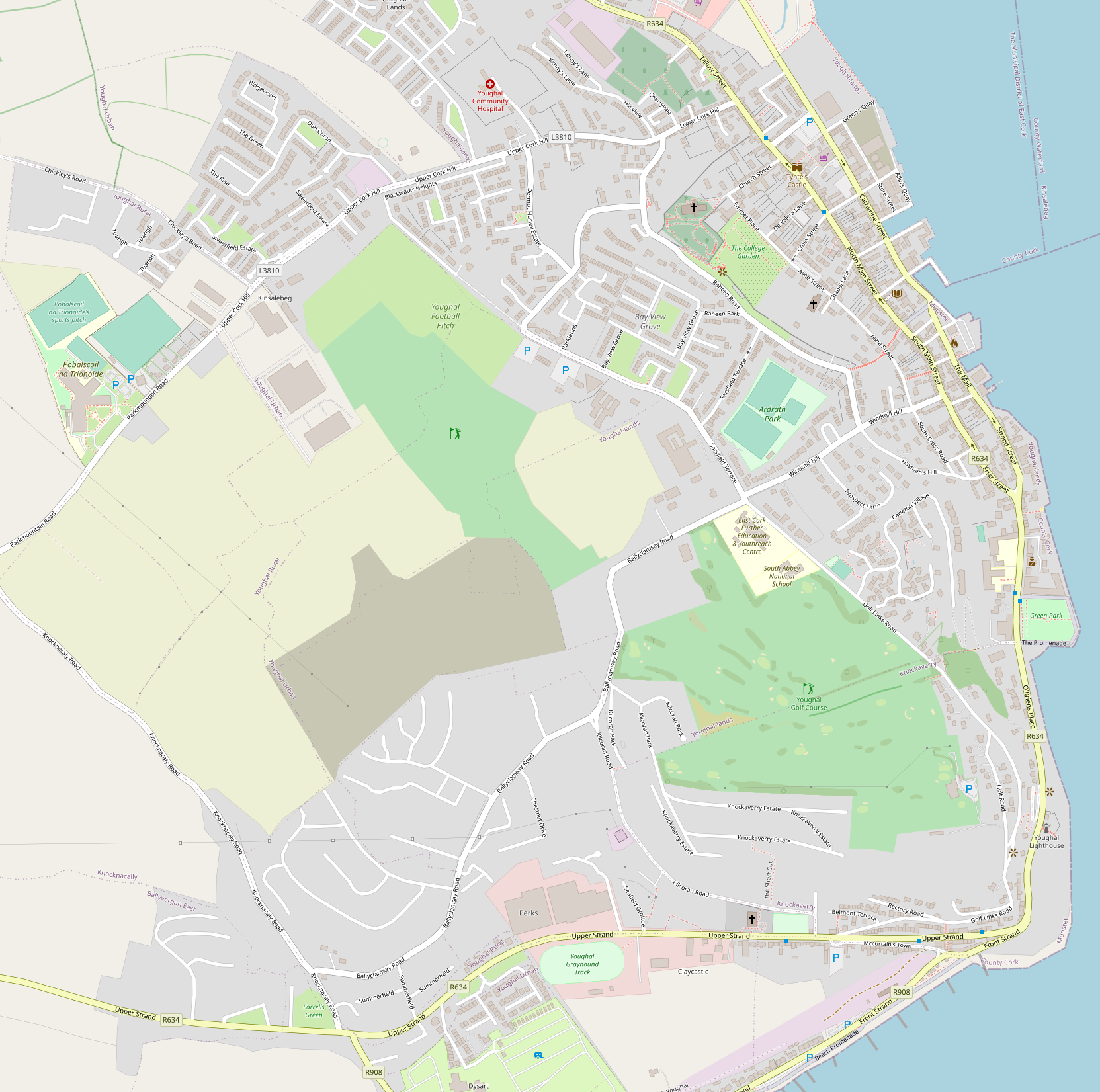
- Location within Youghal Location within Ireland
- Interactive map of North Abbey, Youghal

Monastery information
- Full name: Priory of Our Lady of Graces, Youghal
- Other name: Holy Cross Priory
- Order: Dominican Order
- Denomination: Catholic
- Established: 1268
- Disestablished: 1587
- Dedication: Our Lady of Graces
- Diocese: Cloyne

People
- Founder: Thomas FitzGerald, 2nd Baron Desmond

Architecture
- Status: Ruined
- Functional status: Inactive, graveyard still in use
- Style: Late Gothic

Site
- Location: Greencloyne, Youghal, County Cork
- Country: Ireland
- Coordinates: 51°57′27″N 7°51′16″W
- Visible remains: southwest wall, pillar in the northeast
- Public access: Yes

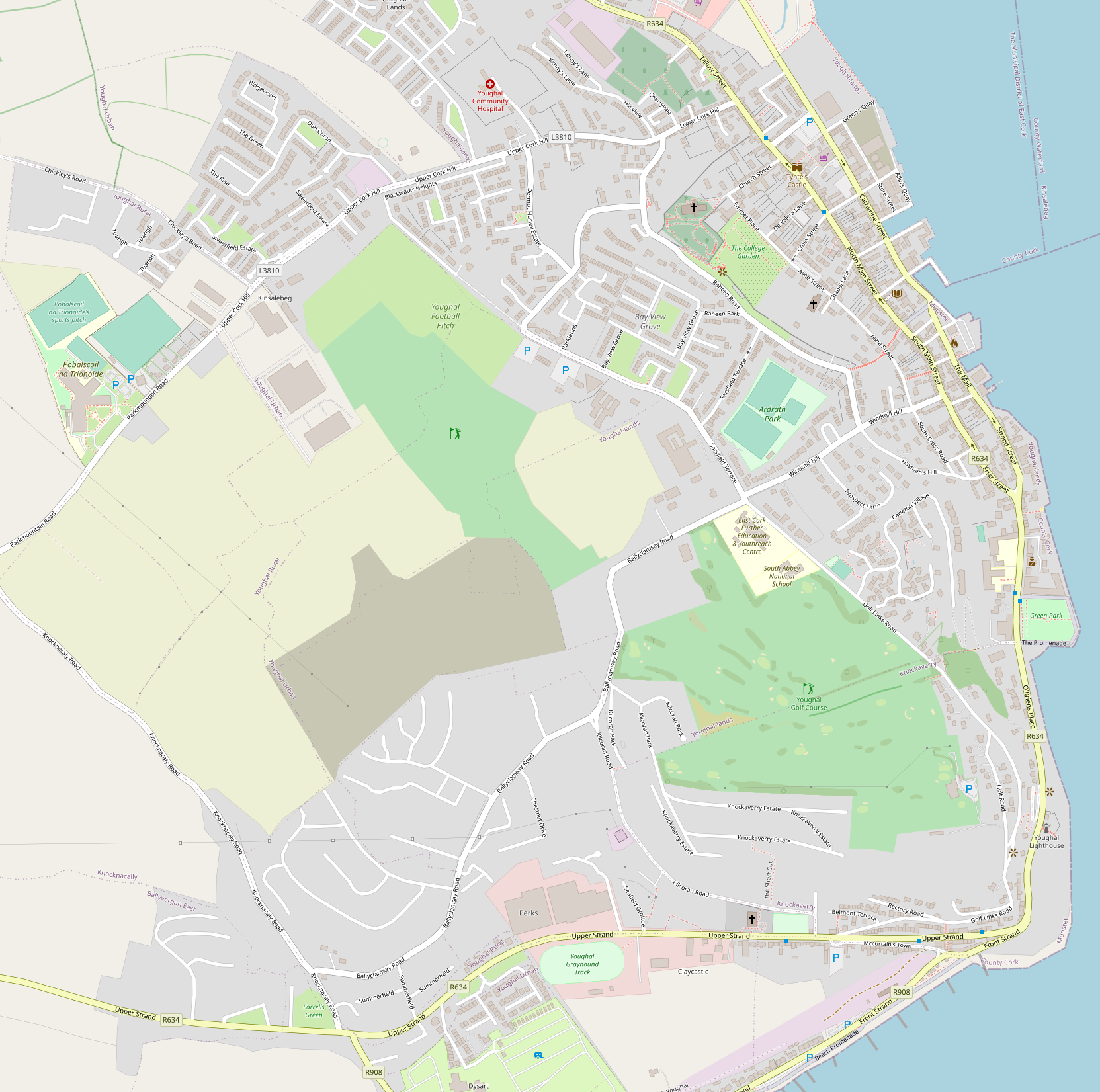
Locations of monastic houses in Youghal

The Priory of Our Lady of Graces, known locally as the North Abbey, was a 13th-century Irish Dominican monastery situated north of Youghal, County Cork.

== History ==
The priory was founded in 1268 by Thomas FitzMaurice FitzGerald, the second baron of Desmond, whose maternal grandfather, Maurice FitzGerald, 2nd Lord of Offaly, had founded the Franciscan Friary of South Abbey, Youghal.

The Dominican priory was initially dedicated to the Holy Cross, but was changed to 'Our Lady of Graces' in the late 15th century following the re-discovery of a small, ivory statue of the Madonna and Child.

Samuel Lewis in his Topographical Dictionary of Ireland, written in 1837, said of it: "Thomas, whose son, in 1263 or 1271, founded a Dominican monastery, called the Priory of St. Mary of Graces".

This statue had made Youghal the centre of Marian devotion for several centuries, but ended after the priory was dissolved under King Henry VIII in the 16th century. The statue can now be found in St Mary's Dominican Priory in Cork City.

Lewis goes on to say that:

The western gable and some of the eastern portions of the Dominican friary, at the north end of the town, still remain

... Near the south end of the town is a chapel of ease, a neat plain building, erected in 1817 on the cemetery of the ancient Dominican friary, at an expense of £1200, of which £900 was a gift from the late Board of First Fruits and £300 was raised by subscription

== Today ==
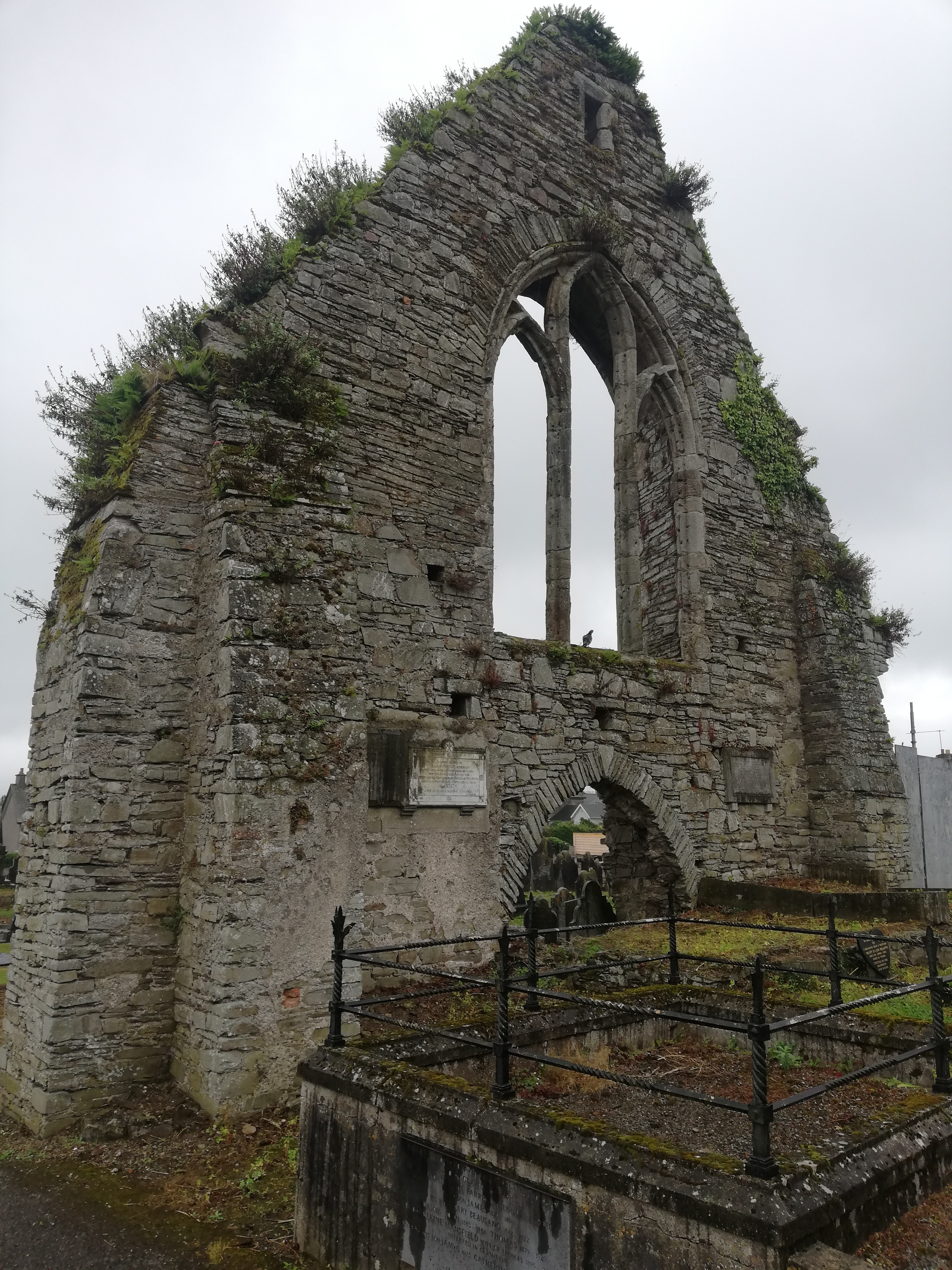
Remains of the west gable

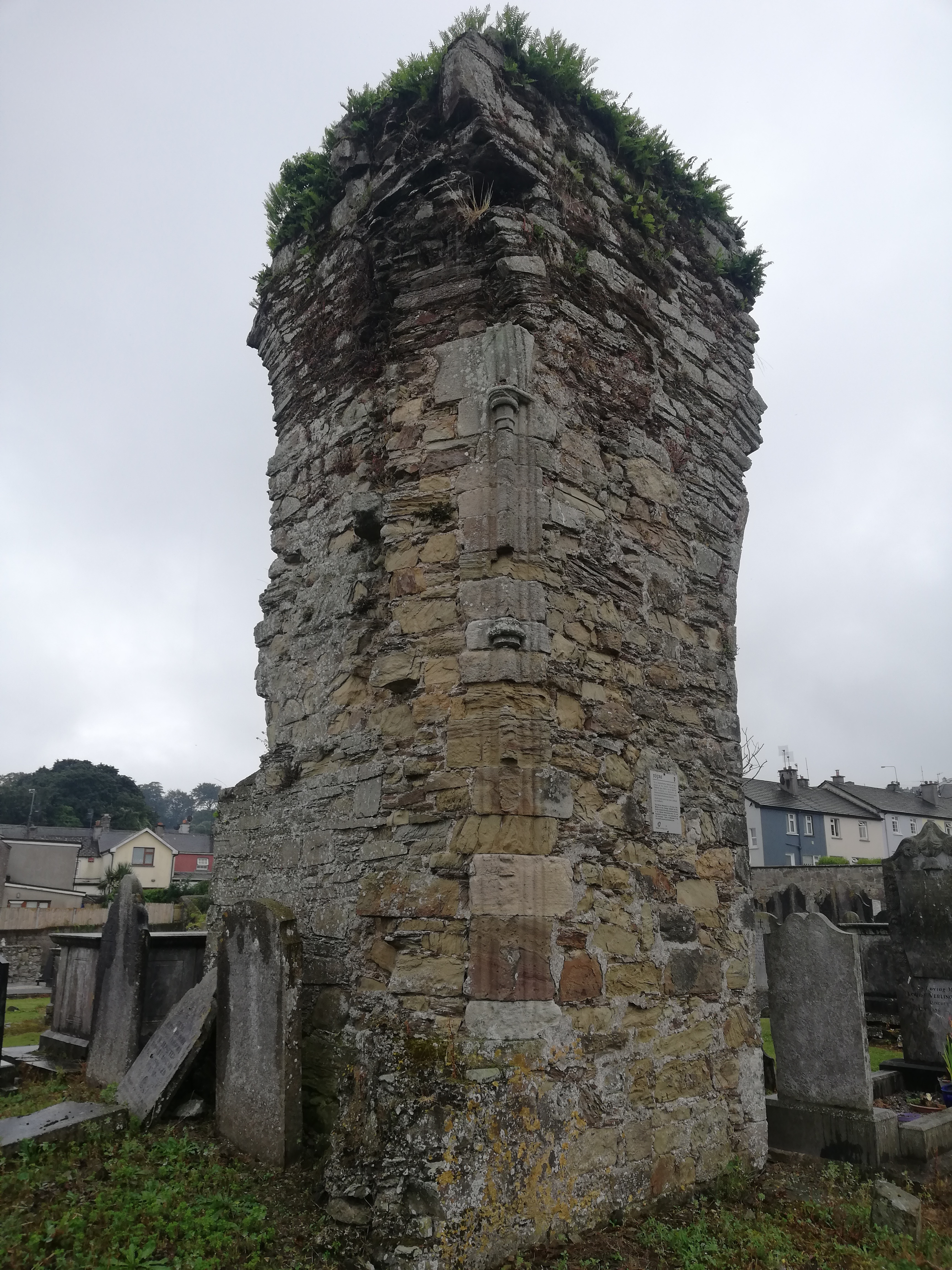
Remains of a decorated pillar

Some ruins of the priory can still be seen, and the area is also home to the main cemetery of Youghal.

== Burials ==
- Thomas FitzGerald, 2nd Baron Desmond
- John FitzGerald, 4th Earl of Desmond
- James FitzGerald, 6th Earl of Desmond
- James FitzGerald, 8th Earl of Desmond
- Thomas FitzGerald, 11th Earl of Desmond

== See also ==
- List of abbeys and priories in Ireland (County Cork)
- Youghal Priory
- Molana Abbey
- Rincrew Abbey
