= Nuala Ní Conchobair =

Queen of Ulaid

Nuala Ní Conchobair (died 1226) was Queen of Ulaid.

Ní Conchobair was a daughter of King Ruaidrí Ua Conchobair (c.1116-1198) and a wife of King Ruaidrí Mac Duinn Sléibe of Ulaidh (died 1201).

After the fall of the kingdom to John de Courcy, the MacDonlevy (dynasty) (I. Mac Duinn Sléibe) were obliged to seek protection in Connacht. They were again forced to move as a result of the encastellation of Connacht by Richard Mor de Burgh, with the result that they were dispersed and faded utterly from power.

Following the death of her husband in 1201, Nuala apparently lived somewhere in north Galway, near Cong, where she was interred upon her death in 1226:

Nuala inghen Ruaidhri Uí Conchobhair baintighearna Uladh d'écc i c-Conga Fechin, & a h-adhnacal go h-onórach i t-teampall canánach Conga/Nuala, daughter of Roderic O'Conor, and Queen of Ulidia, died at Conga Fechin, and was honourably interred in the church of the Canons at Cong.
