= 1234 in Ireland =

- Centuries: 11th; 12th; 13th; 14th; 15th
- Decades: 1210s; 1220s; 1230s; 1240s; 1250s
- See also: Other events of 1234; List of years in Ireland

Events from the year 1234 in Ireland.

== Incumbent ==
- Lord: Henry III

== Events ==
- 1 April – Battle of the Curragh in County Kildare: forces loyal to King Henry III of England defeat those led by Richard Marshal, Earl of Pembroke and Lord of Leinster who later dies from wounds received.

== Deaths ==
- 16 April – Richard Marshal, 3rd Earl of Pembroke (born 1191).
