= South Abbey, Youghal =

- An Mainistir Theas, Eochaill
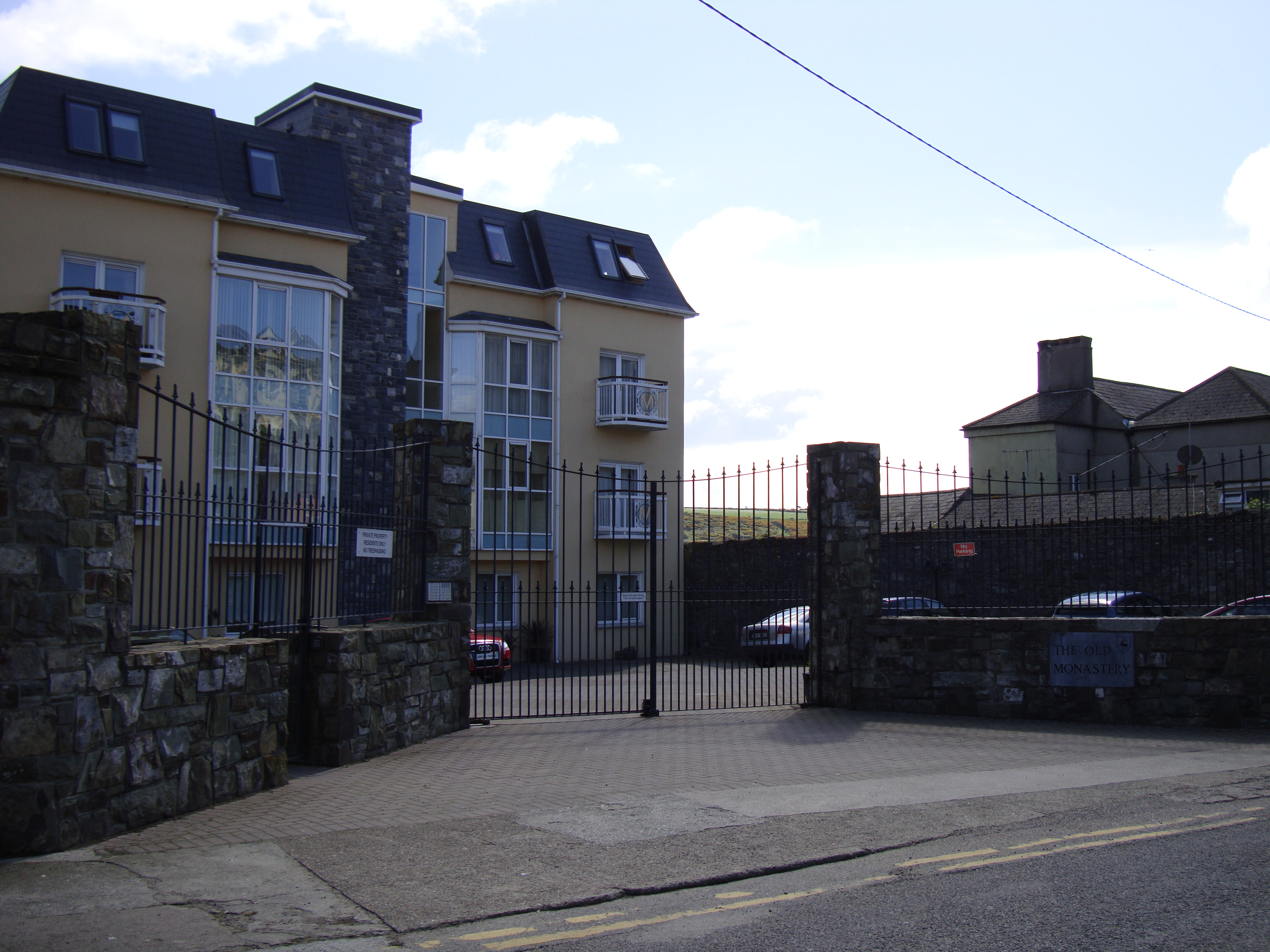
- Housing on the site of the South Abbey

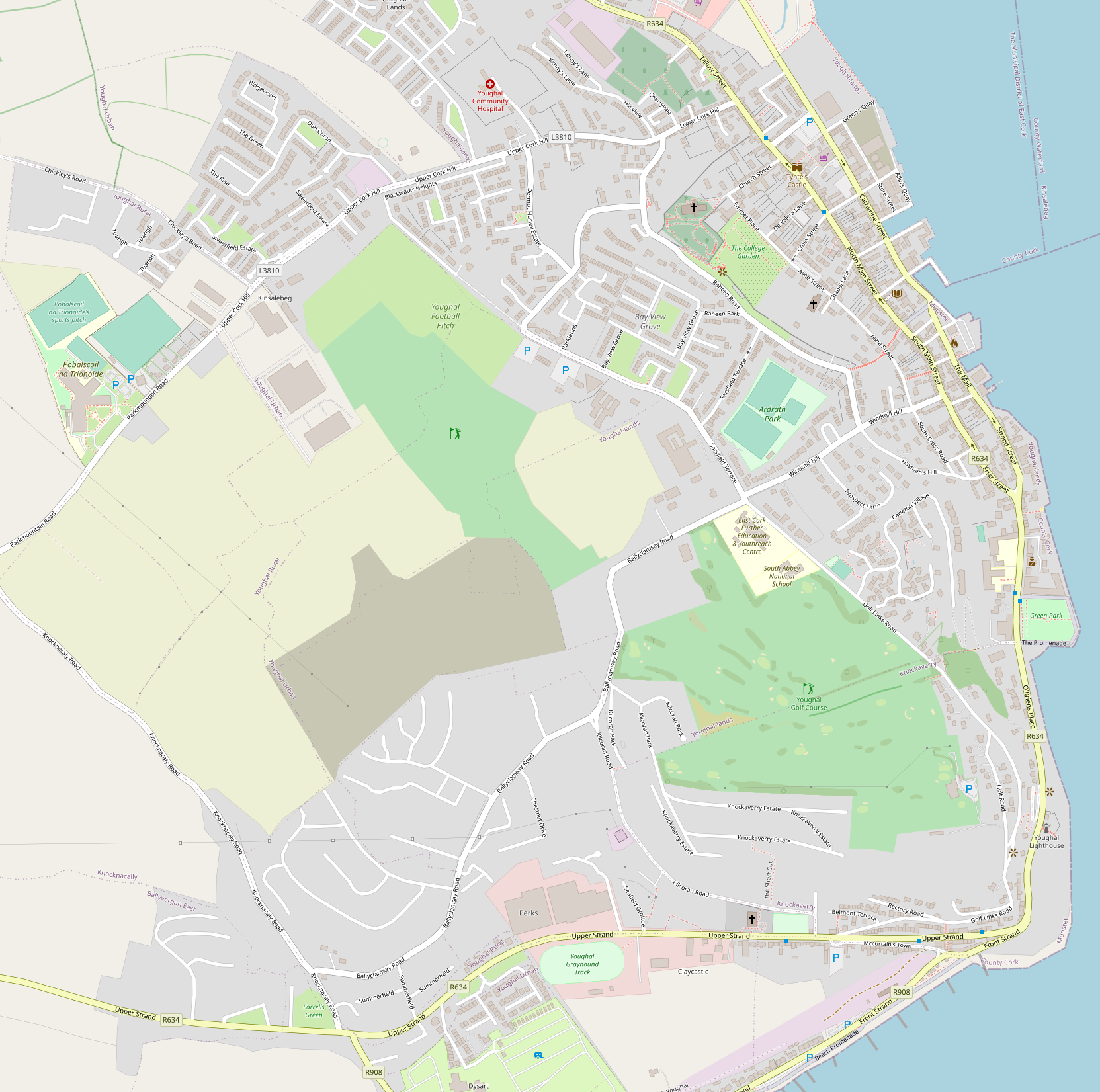
- Location within Youghal Location within Ireland
- Interactive map of South Abbey, Youghal

Monastery information
- Order: Franciscans, Observant Franciscan Friars
- Denomination: Catholic
- Established: 1224
- Disestablished: 1587
- Diocese: Cloyne

People
- Founder: Maurice FitzGerald, 2nd Lord of Offaly

Architecture
- Status: Ruined
- Functional status: Inactive
- Style: Late Gothic

Site
- Location: Youghal-Lands, Youghal, County Cork
- Country: Ireland
- Coordinates: 51°56′59″N 7°50′34″W
- Visible remains: none

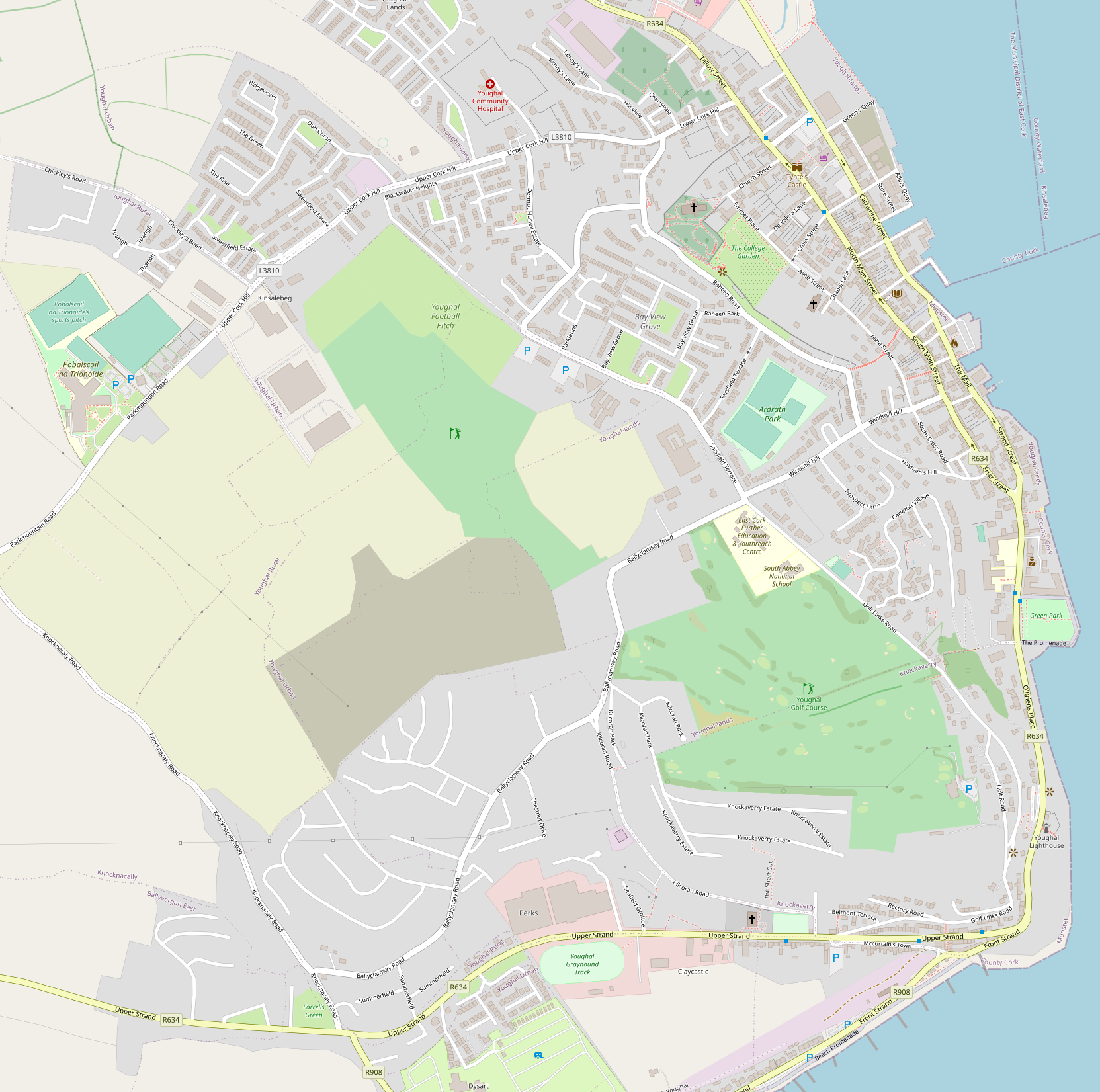
Locations of monastic houses in Youghal

The South Abbey was a Franciscan friary in Youghal, Ireland active between the 13th and 17th centuries.

== History ==
The Franciscan Friary of South Abbey, Youghal was founded in 1224 by Maurice FitzGerald, 2nd Lord of Offaly, and he was buried there in 1257. His grandson Thomas FitzGerald had founded the Dominican Priory of North Abbey, Youghal.

Samuel Lewis in his Topographical Dictionary of Ireland written in 1837 said of it:

In 1224, Maurice FitzGerald founded a Franciscan monastery on the south side of the town, which was the first religious foundation of the order in Ireland. It is recorded that he originally intended the building for a castle, but that, in consequence of some harsh treatment which the workmen received from his eldest son, he changed his design and determined to devote it to religious uses: but, dying in 1257, it was completed in 1260 by his youngest son, Thomas.

The exact year of when the first Franciscans came to Youghal, is uncertain and some sources cite 1224, and others 1226. Either way both dates are close to the lifetime of St. Francis of Assisi.

The Friary were dissolved in the 16th century, and no remains of it can be seen today.

However some local sources suggest that there was some remains but were demolished when the site became home to the Pugin designed convent of the Presentation Sisters.

== Today ==
The convent has since closed and is now an International college The nearby south abbey national school has now moved into a renovated school on the golf links road, leaving the old school empty.

== See also ==
- List of abbeys and priories in Ireland (County Cork)
- Youghal Priory
- Molana Abbey
- Rincrew Abbey

== Sources ==
- Samuel Lewis, Topographical Dictionary of Ireland, 1837.
