= Glanworth Abbey =

Ruined Dominican abbey in Cork, Ireland

Coordinates: 52.1910°N 8.3567°W

- Mainistir Ghleannuir
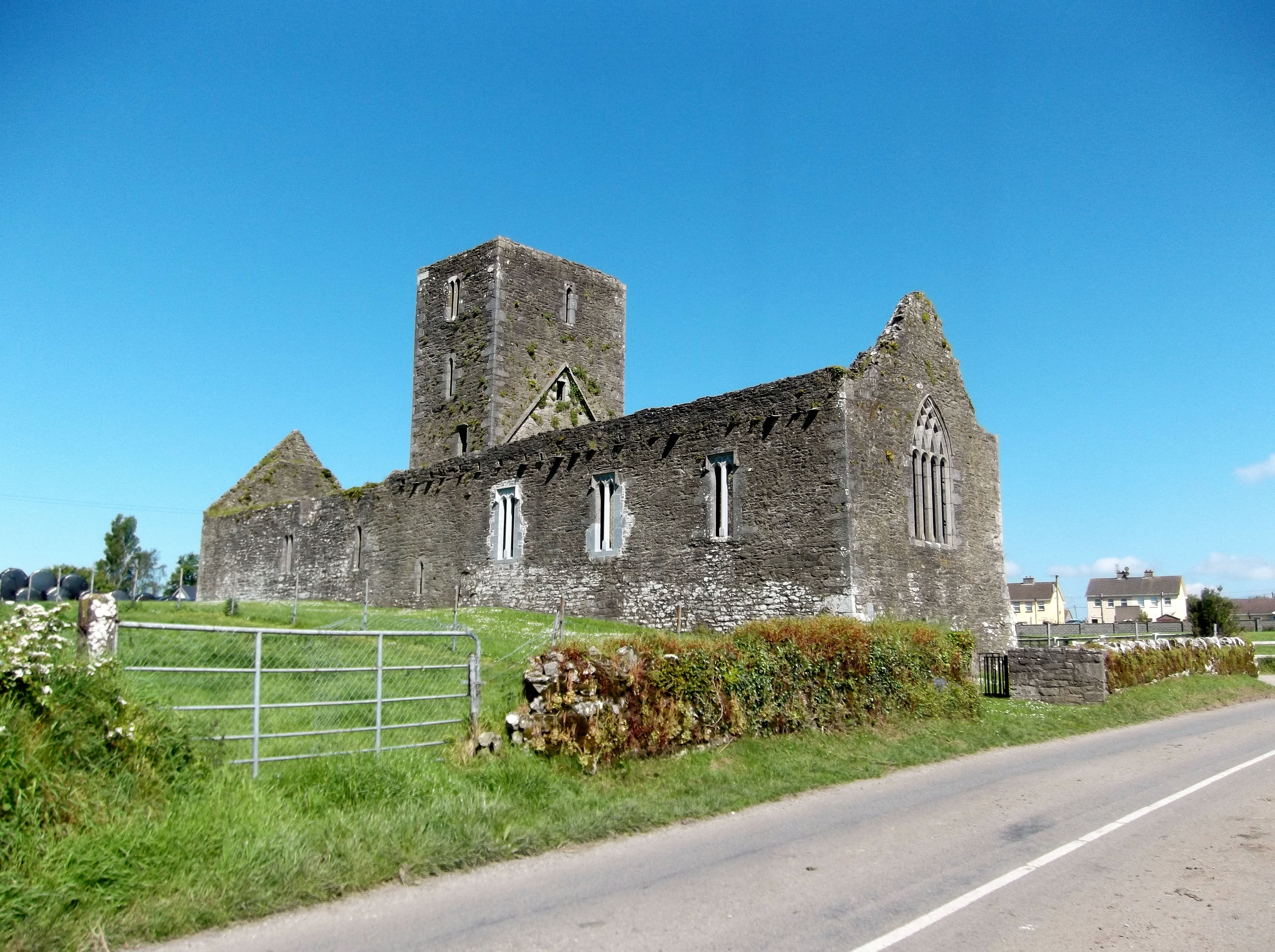

Monastery information
- Other names: Priory of the Holy Cross, Rock Abbey
- Order: Dominican

National monument of Ireland
- Official name: Rock Abbey, Glanworth
- Reference no.: 558

Glanworth Abbey (Irish: Mainistir Ghleannuir), also known as the Priory of the Holy Cross and as the Rock Abbey is a ruined Dominican abbey in Glanworth, County Cork, Ireland.

== History ==
Despite early estimations of the foundation as being in 1227, the abbey is not included in the Dominican catalogue of 1300. The foundation is more likely to have been in 1475. The abbey was suppressed circa. February 1541.

== Architecture ==
The abbey would once have featured a cemetery, a church including a belfry, a cloister, and a dormitory. The abbey sat on an acreage of 10 acres, and itself enclosed one acre.
