= Luke Netterville (priest) =

Anglo-Norman churchman (??–1227)

Luke Netterville (or Lucas de Nutrevilla; died 1227) was an Anglo-Norman churchman in Ireland, archbishop of Armagh from 1218.

== Life ==
Netterville was appointed Archdeacon of Armagh about 1207. The diocesan chapter of Armagh in 1216 chose Netterville as archbishop, but their act was annulled on the ground that the assent of the Crown of England had not previously been obtained. After a money composition, a new election was held, under royal authority, and Netterville was appointed to the archbishopric. On 6 July 1218 the king wrote to the pope saying he had given his assent to Netterville's election, and asking for papal confirmation. The pallium was sent to him from Rome, and he received consecration from Stephen Langton.

After his return to Ireland in 1224, Netterville established the Saint Mary Magdalene, Dominican Friary in Drogheda for members of the Dominican order. He claimed the title Primate of Ireland, but Henry of London as Archbishop of Dublin maintained his claim to be the dominant Irish churchman. Netterville resided in Drogheda with the Augustinians, but was driven out at one point, and went to Llanthony Secunda. He died on 17 April 1227, and was buried at Mellifont Abbey.

== Notes ==
Attribution

- This article incorporates text from a publication now in the public domain: Lee, Sidney, ed. (1894). "Netterville, Lucas de". Dictionary of National Biography. Vol. 40. London: Smith, Elder & Co.
