= Youghal Priory =

Coordinates: 51.9543°N 7.8487°W

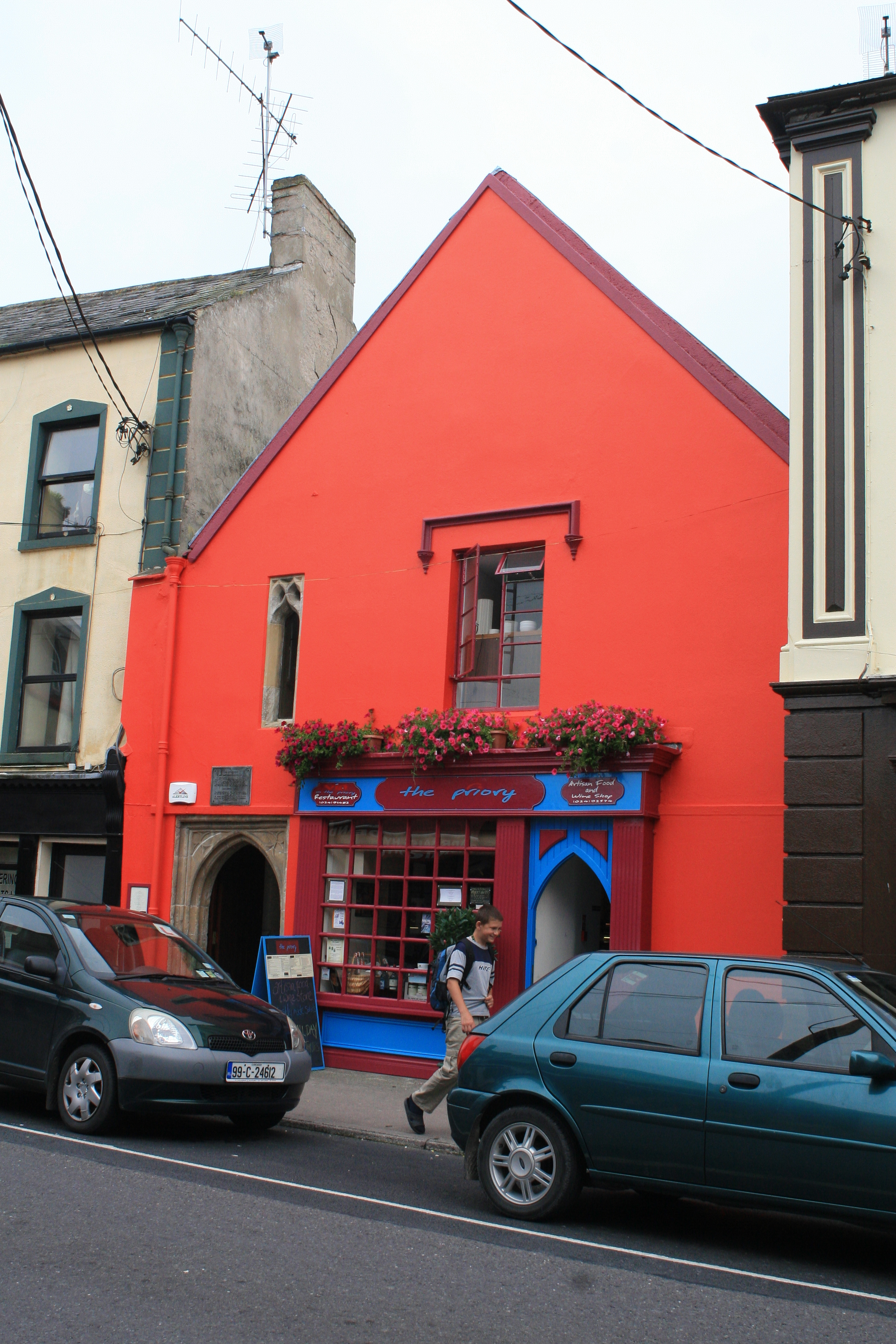
Preserved front of the monastery, including the 14th-century doorway

St John's House is a former 12th-century Irish Benedictine monastery situated in the centre of Youghal, County Cork. It was one of several religious houses in that city known by the name of Youghal Priory.

== History ==
The monastery was founded on the Main Street in 1185. It was a dependency of St. John Priory in Waterford, a double monastery that also provided hospital care and which was itself a dependency of Bath Abbey in England. It served as a hospital for the sick until the Dissolution of the Monasteries.

Oliver Cromwell made his headquarters here during the winter of 1649, and he inspected his troops every morning from the monastery.

== Features ==
Small portions of the building still survive, which include a Gothic moulded door, ornamental spandrels and original ambry. The archway beyond the door leads to a passage of the original structure.

== See also ==
- List of abbeys and priories in Ireland (County Cork)
- North Abbey, Youghal
- South Abbey, Youghal
