= 1222 =

1222 in various calendars
- Gregorian calendar: 1222; MCCXXII
- Ab urbe condita: 1975
- Armenian calendar: 671; ԹՎ ՈՀԱ
- Assyrian calendar: 5972
- Balinese saka calendar: 1143–1144
- Bengali calendar: 628–629
- Berber calendar: 2172
- English Regnal year: 6 Hen. 3 – 7 Hen. 3
- Buddhist calendar: 1766
- Burmese calendar: 584
- Byzantine calendar: 6730–6731
- Chinese calendar: 辛巳年 (Metal Snake); 3919 or 3712 — to — 壬午年 (Water Horse); 3920 or 3713
- Coptic calendar: 938–939
- Discordian calendar: 2388
- Ethiopian calendar: 1214–1215
- Hebrew calendar: 4982–4983
- Hindu calendars
- Vikram Samvat: 1278–1279
- Shaka Samvat: 1143–1144
- Kali Yuga: 4322–4323
- Holocene calendar: 11222
- Igbo calendar: 222–223
- Iranian calendar: 600–601
- Islamic calendar: 618–619
- Japanese calendar: Jōkyū 4 / Jōō 1 (貞応元年)
- Javanese calendar: 1130–1131
- Julian calendar: 1222; MCCXXII
- Korean calendar: 3555
- Minguo calendar: 690 before ROC 民前690年
- Nanakshahi calendar: −246
- Thai solar calendar: 1764–1765
- Tibetan calendar: ལྕགས་མོ་སྦྲུལ་ལོ་ (female Iron-Snake); 1348 or 967 or 195 — to — ཆུ་ཕོ་རྟ་ལོ་ (male Water-Horse); 1349 or 968 or 196

Year 1222 (MCCXXII) was a common year starting on Saturday of the Julian calendar.

== Events ==
=== By place ===
==== Asia ====
- The Ghurid dynasty capital of Firozkoh (in modern-day Afghanistan) is destroyed, by Mongol Emperor Ögedei Khan.
- After the invasion and destruction of the Khwarezmian Empire in 1221, Genghis Khan returns to Mongolia, and a rebellion sparks in Helmand, to which the response is a large army led by Ögedei Khan sent into the region to put an end to the rebellion of Muhammad the Marghani, resulting in the killing of every man in Ghazni and Helmand, and the enslavement and selling of most of the women of the region.
- Genghis Khan’s armies were said to have killed approximately 1.6 million people in the city of Herat, in Northwestern Afghanistan.

==== Mesoamerica ====
- Chiconquiauhtzin becomes Ruler of the City-state Azcapotzalco at the Valley of Mexico

==== Europe ====
- April 17 – Stephen Langton, Archbishop of Canterbury in England, opens a council at Osney Abbey, Oxford.
- May 9 – Synod of Oxford – The 1222 Christian Synod of Oxford passes antisemitic laws that forbid social interactions between Jews and Christians, places a specific tithe on Jews and requires them to wear an identifying badge.
- May 11 – 1222 Cyprus earthquake.
- August – After the death of John I of Sweden on March 10, 6-year-old Erik Eriksson is elected new King of Sweden (sometime between this time and July 1223).
- December 15 – The Golden Bull of 1222 is issued in Hungary, limiting the power of the monarchy over the nobility.
- December 25 – The 1222 Brescia earthquake is so powerful that the inhabitants of Brescia leave their city en masse and camp outside so that falling buildings would not crush them, according to chronicler Salimbene de Adam.
- Livonian Crusade – The Danish fail in their attempt to conquer Saaremaa Island from the Estonians.
- Ottokar I of Bohemia reunites Bohemia and Moravia.
- The Cistercian convent in Alcobaça, Portugal, is completed.
- Approximate date – The Royal Standard of Scotland is adopted.
- Traditional date – The University of Padua is founded in Italy, by Frederick II, Holy Roman Emperor.

== Births ==
- February 16 – Nichiren, founder of Nichiren Buddhism (d. 1282)
- August 4 – Richard de Clare, 6th Earl of Gloucester, English soldier (d. 1262)
- Queen Jeongsun (Wonjong) of Korea (d. 1237)

== Deaths ==
- February 1 – Alexios Megas Komnenos, first Emperor of Trebizond
- March 10 – Johan Sverkersson, king of Sweden since 1216 (b. 1201)
- June 23 – Constance of Aragon, Holy Roman Empress, queen consort of Hungary (b. 1179)
- August 2 – Raymond VI, Count of Toulouse (b. 1156)
- August 12 – Duke Vladislaus III of Bohemia
- Theodore I Lascaris, founder of the Byzantine Empire of Nicaea
