= List of monastic houses in County Kildare =

The smaller establishments such as monastic cells and notable monastic granges (particularly those with resident monks) and camerae of the military orders of monks (Knights Templars and Knights Hospitallers) are included. The numerous monastic hospitals per se are not included here unless at some time the foundation had, or was purported to have, the status or function of an abbey, priory, or preceptory/commandery.

== Layout ==
Communities/provenance: shows the status and communities existing at each establishment, together with such dates as have been established as well as the fate of the establishment after dissolution, and the current status of the site.

Formal name or dedication: shows the formal name of the establishment or the person in whose name the church is dedicated, where known.

Alternative names: some of the establishments have had alternative names over the course of time. In order to assist in text-searching such alternatives in name or spelling have been provided.

== Abbreviations and key ==
The sites listed are ruins or fragmentary remains unless indicated thus:
*	current monastic function
+	current non-monastic ecclesiastic function
^	current non-ecclesiastic function
=	remains incorporated into later structure
#	no identifiable trace of the monastic foundation remains
~	exact site of monastic foundation unknown
ø	possibly no such monastic foundation at location
¤	no such monastic foundation
≈	identification ambiguous or confused

Locations with names in italics indicate probable duplication (misidentification with another location) or non-existent foundations (either erroneous reference or proposed foundation never implemented).

Trusteeship denoted as follows:
NIEA	Scheduled Monument (NI)
NM	National Monument (ROI)
C.I.	Church of Ireland
R.C.	Roman Catholic Church

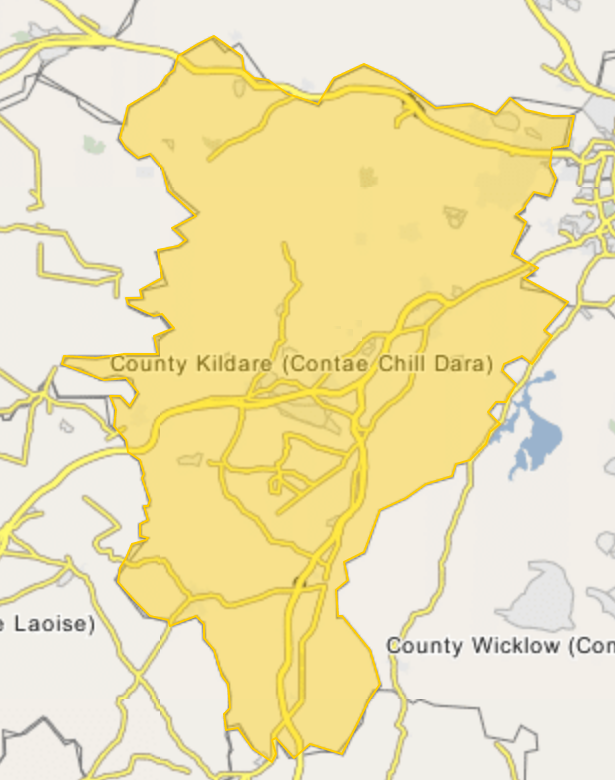
Locations of monastic houses in County Kildare
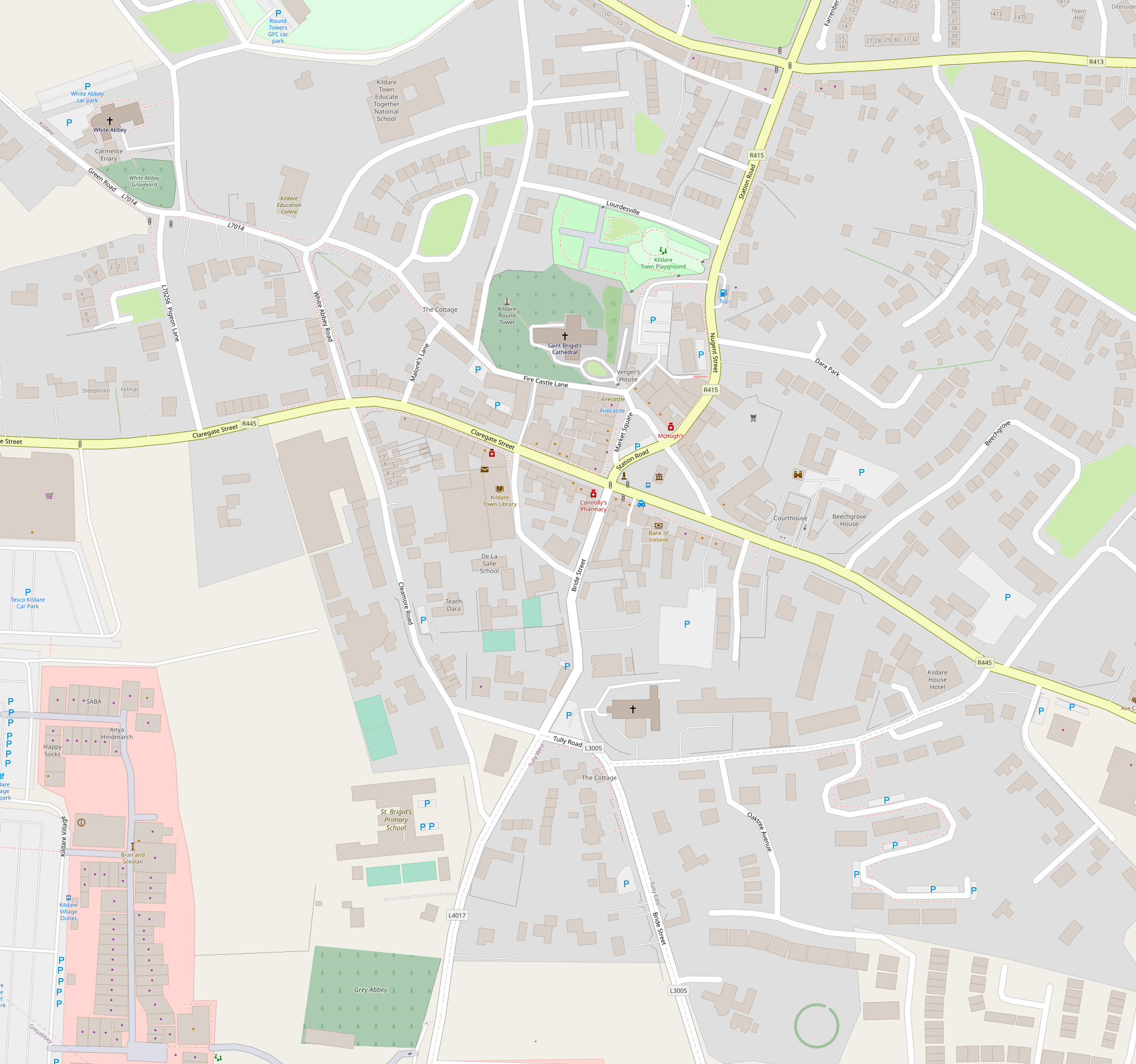
Locations of monastic houses in Kildare
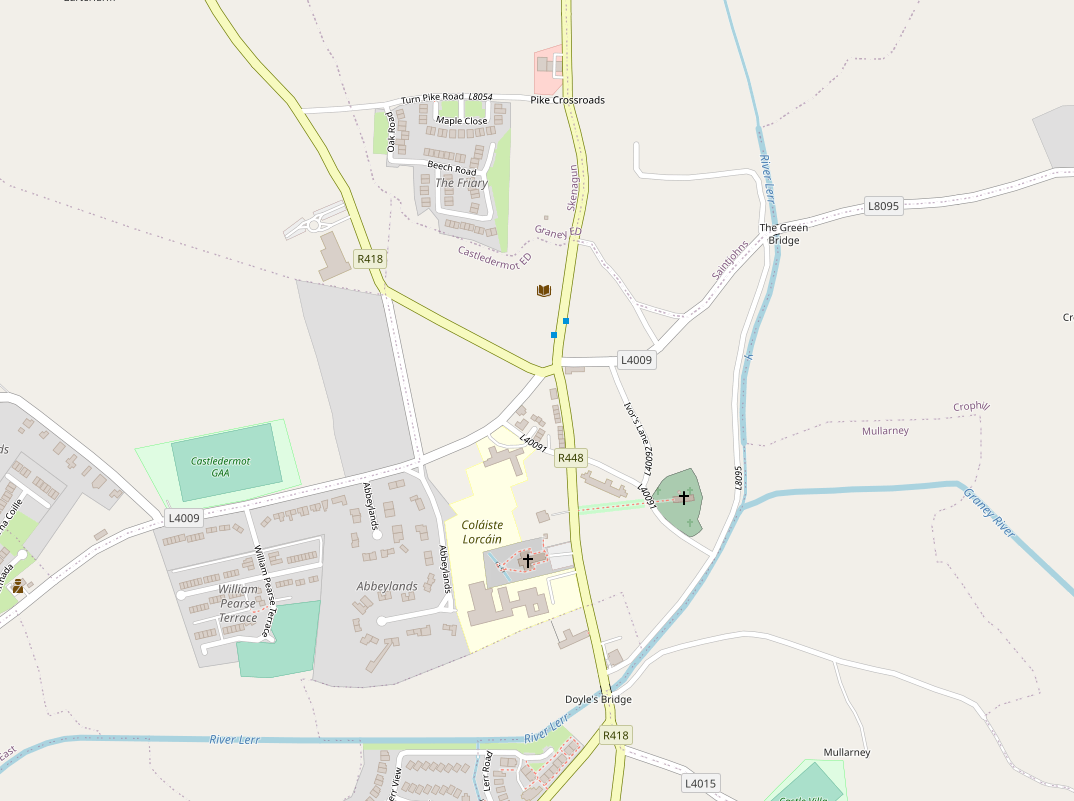
Locations of monastic houses in Castledermot
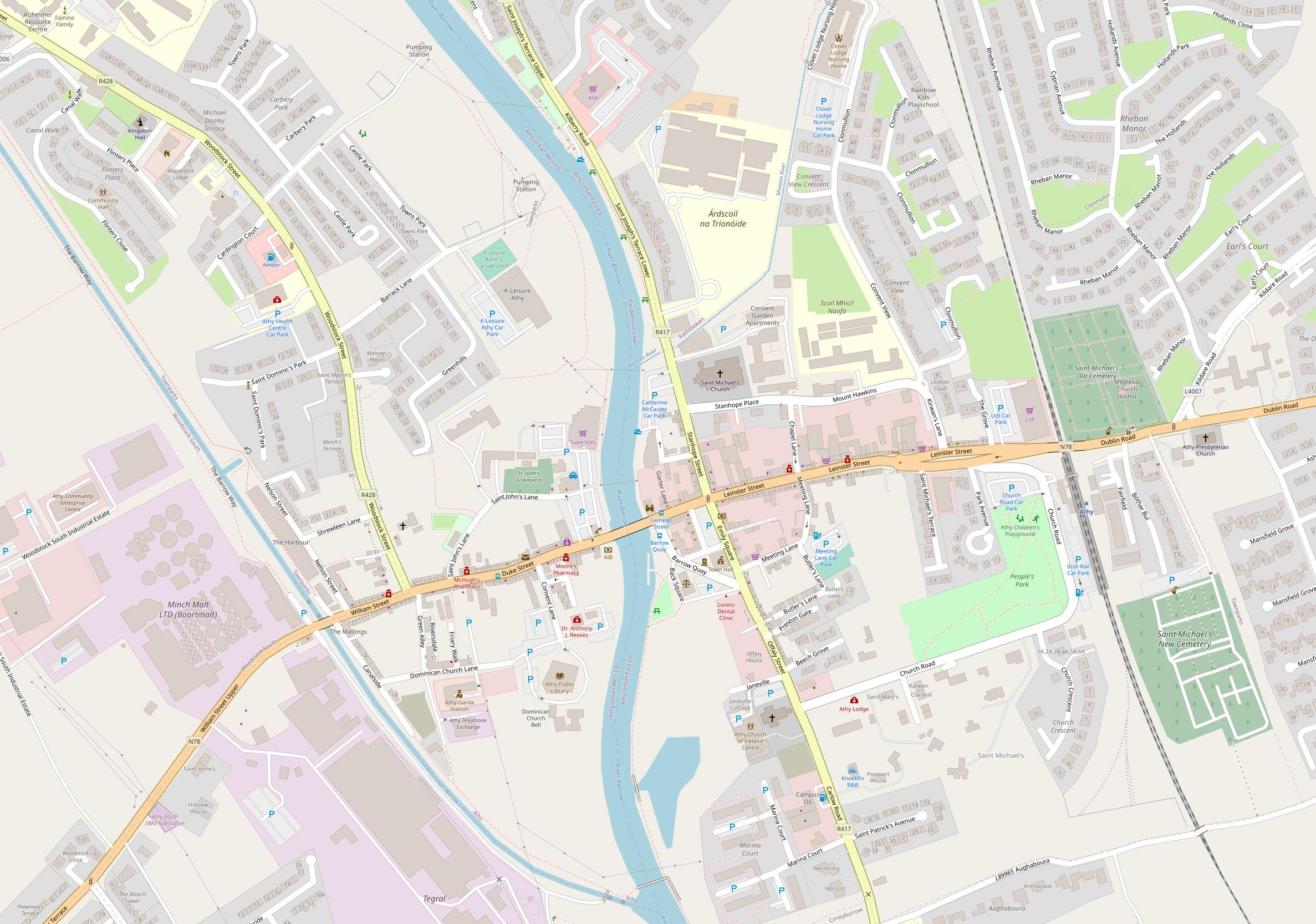
Locations of monastic houses in Athy

Foundation	Image	Communities & provenance	Formal name or dedication & alternative names	References & location
Athy Priory *		Dominican Friars founded 1253-7; dissolved 30 April 1539; rented to Martin Pelles 26 April 1540; refounded c.1622 by Fr Ross Mageoghegan; chapel enlarged 1864-7; dissolved mid-19th century; new church built and opened 17 March 1965; extant; old church demolished 1973	St Peter, Martyr; St Dominic ____________________; Bailr-atha-ai; Athai; Athies	52°59′26″N 6°59′00″W
Athy Priory Hospital		Fratres Cruciferi founded after 1199 (1253?) by Richard de St Michael, Lord of Rhebane (during the reign of King John); dissolved 1540	The Priory of Saint John; The Priory of Saint John and Saint Thomas of Cruciferi; St Thomas the Martyr (from 13th century)	52°59′33″N 6°59′13″W
Castledermot Friary		Franciscan Friars founded before 1247; dissolved 1540	Disert-diarmuta; Tristle-dermot; Desert	52°54′37″N 6°50′06″W
Castledermot Monastery		early monastic site, Gaelic monks founded 842 by the son of Aed Roin, King of Corcu Bascind; plundered by the Danes 842; burned 1106; probably continuing after 1111	Disert-diarmuta; Tristle-dermot; Desert	52°54′31″N 6°50′14″W
Castledermot Priory		Knights Templar? (according to tradition); Fratres Cruciferi (re)founded before 1216 by Lord Walter de Ridlesford (during the reign of King John); dissolved 1540; St John's Tower is the only surviving remnant	Priory and Hospital of Saint John the Baptist	52°54′51″N 6°50′17″W
Celbridge Abbey *		built 1697 by Bartholomew Van Homrigh, Lord Mayor of Dublin; St John of God Hospitallers operated as a care home		53°20′12″N 6°32′33″W
Clane Friary		Franciscan Friars Minor, Conventual founded 1258 by Gerald FitzMaurice FitzGerald, Lord of Offaly, purportedly buried here 1287; dissolved 1540; granted to a number of people 1541-2 for the use of Sir Thomas Luttrell; friars remained until monastery destroyed c.1606; restored 1647; dissolved c.1650	Cloenath; Claenath; Claenad; Claona; Cleonad; Cloney; Cluain	53°17′21″N 6°40′59″W
Clane Monastery		early monastic site, Gaelic monks founded c.800 by St Ailbe; probably continuing after 1111		
Clonagh Monastery ^{ø}		possible monastic site — order and period unknown land obtained by priests 1396 without the King's consent, and concealed from the King		53°23′58″N 6°54′33″W (approx)
Cloncurry Friary		Carmelite Friars founded 1347 by John Roch (Roche), license granted by Edward III; dissolved 1539, church seized 30 April 1539; granted to William Dickson 1543; passed to Richard Slayne; passed to the Foster family; William Foster had purportedly been seized of the monastery by the time of his death 1602; convent restored by c.1737	Cluain-conaire; Concurry	53°14′18″N 6°57′12″W (possible)
Cloncurry Monastery		early monastic site, reputedly founded by St Ninian (Mo-nenn)		
Donaghmore Monastery		Patrician monks/Columban monks founded 6th century	Domnach-mor-maige-laudat	53°22′37″N 6°33′11″W
Dunmanoge Monastery		early monastic site, Gaelic monks church founded by Finnian of Clonard, land granted by Carbreus, King of Leinster; probably not continuing after 10th century	Mugna-moschenog; Mugna-helchan; Mugna-selchain?	52°53′43″N 6°55′04″W
Dunmurraghill Monastery		early monastic site, Gaelic monks church founded by St Patrick; probably not continuing after 10th century	Druim-urchaille; Droma-urchaille	53°20′36″N 6°45′49″W (?)
Graney Abbey		Augustinian nuns — Arroasian priory founded c.1200 by Walter de Riddlesford; raised to abbey status before 1276; dissolved 7 February 1539; granted to Leonard, Lord Grey; granted to Anthony St Leger 1542	St Mary ____________________; Graine; Grane; Greyn	52°54′05″N 6°46′59″W
Grangerosnolvan Monastery		nuns according to tradition; Cistercian monks grange of Baltinglass	Grange Nolven	
Great Connell Priory		Augustinian Canons Regular dependent on Llanthony; founded 1202 by Meyler fitz Henry, Justiciar, buried here; dissolved 1540, before 24 November; granted to Edward Randolfe; granted to Sir Edward Butler; granted to Sir Nicholas White 1560; granted to Edmond Butler 1566	St Mary and St David ____________________; Greatconnell; Monaster-Conghbala; Conal; Connayl	53°10′19″N 6°46′41″W
Inchaquire ?Friary		Dominican Friars license granted 1488; possibly a vicarage of Athy between 1488 and 1627	Intyma Kudir; Inseueyr	53°01′41″N 6°47′34″W (approx)
Kilberry 'Abbey' ^{ø}		supposed monastic site - order and period unknown; "abbey", (Note: Ordnance Survey) traditionally a nunnery; possible Knights Hospitaller with sisters attached	Cel-berra	53°02′04″N 7°01′33″W
Kilcock Monastery ^{ø}		supposed nuns — order and period unknown	Cell-cocha; Cell-coice; Cell-cork	53°24′05″N 6°40′02″W?
Kilcork Camera		Knights Templar founded 13th century; dissolved 1308; manor exchanged with Thomas Fitz John, Earl of Kildare 1318, rectory retained for the Knights Hospitaller		53°03′09″N 6°53′29″W(?)
Kilcullen Abbey		Observant Franciscan Friars founded 1486 (1470 (Note: Analecta Hibernica (Irish Manuscript Collection) No.6, November 1934, iii, p.197 — but 1486 on p.200)) by Roland FitzEustace, Baron of Portlester, buried here; dissolved before 30 April 1539, appurtenances seized, occupied by Thomas (Eustace), Lord of Kilcullen; expelled 1547; granted to Edmund Spenser 1582; 1640s	New Abbey; Cell-ciluinn; Ouen	53°07′40″N 6°44′07″W
Kildare Abbey		early monastic site, nuns; founded 5th century (c.430) by St Brigid; monks and nuns double monastery before 528; plundered a number of times; Augustinian nuns — Arroasian? founded after 1171?; episcopal diocesan cathedral built in the abbey grounds between 1223 and 1230, extant; dissolved 1540-1; farmed by Francis Cosby and Raymond Oge (FizGerald) 1448; granted to Anthony Deering 1585	St Brigid	53°09′29″N 6°54′44″W
Kildare — Grey Abbey		Franciscan Friars Minor, Conventual founded c.1254 by the ancestors of the Earls of Kildare or 1260 by Gerald Fitz Maurice, Lord Offaly or William de Vescy; Observant Franciscan Friars refounded 1520; surrendered 30 April 1539; occupied by Philip FytzMores (Fitzmaurice); granted to Daniel Sutton 1543; destroyed 1547 and abandoned; reestablished 1621 dissolved c.1770		53°09′11″N 6°54′51″W
Kildare — White Abbey		Carmelite Friars founded 1290 by William de Vescy; dissolved April 1539, surrendered by the prior; granted to William Dickson; new church built 1884	St Mary	53°09′34″N 6°55′00″W
Killashee Monastery ^{#}		early monastic site, founded 5th century by St Patrick; plundered in raids by the Danes 1035; remains of non-monastic 15th-century round tower on site	Cell-ausaille; Cell-usaille; Kill-auxille; Kill-Osey; Kill-usaille	53°11′20″N 6°40′20″W
Killelan 'Abbey'		Knights Hospitaller hospital confirmed by Innocent III 1212		52°57′49″N 6°48′10″W
Killybegs Preceptory		Knights Hospitaller founded before 1212, confirmed by Innocent III dissolved before 1400	Kilbegge; Kilbegs	53°17′06″N 6°44′38″W
Kilrush Cell		Augustinian Canons Regular cell dependent on Cartmel; founded c.1201; leased by Prior Rawson to Thomas Alen and Mary his wife 1527; dissolved before 1540; granted to Thomas, Earl of Ormond 1558	Cell-rois; Kylros	53°04′16″N 6°52′06″W(?)
Kilteel Preceptory		supposed early monastic site Knights Hospitaller founded before 1212 by Maurice FitzGerald, confirmed by Innocent III; dissolved before 1527	Cell-cele-Croist; Kil-heel; Kil-hele; Kil-hill; Kylehale	53°13′58″N 6°31′33″W (approx)
Knocknacree Monastery		order, period and foundation unknown; formerly traces of a religious foundation (Note: Mervyn Archdall, Monasticon Hibernicum, 1786, p.332)	Knocknacroith	52°52′01″N 6°49′04″W (approx)
Leixlip Abbey ^{ø≈}		land granted to St Catherine's, Dublin before 1224; reference to 'monastery' probably error for a chantry; rectory held by St Thomas's Abbey 1540	The Blessed Virgin Mary; The Abbey Church of Saint Wolstan, Leixlip	
Lully Monastery		early monastic site, founded before 584; Anchorites before 784	Lilcach; Liolcaig; Lullymore	53°16′47″N 6°56′34″W
Maganey Monastery ^{ø}		purported early monastic site, founded 6th century? by St Abban, son of Cormac, King of Laigin	Mag-arnaide; Maghinemna; Moyarney	52°54′22″N 6°55′32″W (approx)
Monasterevin Monastery ^{#}		early monastic site, founded by St Emin, buried here; Cistercian monks Consecrated 27 October 1189 (1178?) dedicated to St Mary and St Benedict, site granted and confirmed by Dermot O'Dempsey, King of Offaly; dissolved 1540?; granted to George, Lordd Audley; assigned to Adam Loftus; later to the family of the Earl of Drogheda; site now (thought to be) occupied by a stately home named 'Moore Abbey', in use as a hospice 1945–present (below)	Monaster-evan; Ros-glaisi; Ross-glass-na-muimnech; Rosglas; Rosea Vallis	53°08′08″N 7°03′45″W
Moone Abbey		early monastic site, founded 6th century, probably by St Colmcille, patron; purported medieval religious house — order unknown	Maein-Choluim-Chille; Maon-Choluim-Chille; Monmohenock; Mooney	52°58′46″N 6°49′31″W
Moone Friary ^{ø}		suggested Franciscan Friars founded 1258 by Sir Gerald Fitzmaurice — contemporary evidence lacking — possible confusion with Clane		
Moore Abbey *, Monasterevin		Sisters of Charity of Jesus and Mary founded 1945; extant; stately home (thought to be) built on the site of Monasterevin Monastery (above), in use as a hospice		53°08′10″N 7°03′46″W
Naas Priory		Augustinian Canons Regular founded before 1200? by a baron of Naas; hospital added; dissolved 1539, surrendered by Prior Thomas Poswyk 26 July 1539; granted to Thomas Alen of Dublin 20 April 1540; granted to Richard Mannering 1553; leased to Roger Finglas 1568	St John the Baptist ____________________; Nas-na-rig; Nais; Nasse; Le Nas; Nasa; Nass; Asensis; Vas	53°13′12″N 6°39′39″W
Naas Austin Friary		Augustinian Friars founded 14th century? purportedly by a White, or a Cullen of Dublin; dissolved 1539-40; rented by John Sutton after 1540; owned by Hugh Molton 1580-1; leased to Nicholas Aylmer, for fifty years, in 1584	'The Monastery of the Moat'	
Naas Priory		Dominican Friars founded 1355-6, licensed by Edward III c.1356; dissolved 1540; granted to Robert Eustace and others 15 June 1542, for the use of Sir Thomas Luttrell; later assigned to John Travers; now at Newbridge	St Eustace	
Naas Hospitallers		Knights Hospitaller frankhouse; held by James Tyrrell 1540; held by Walter Hope of Mullingar 1578, under lease granted by Prior Massingberd of Kilmainham		
Old Kilcullen Friary ^{ø}		purported Observant Franciscan Friars (Note: J. Cooke, Handbook for Travellers in Ireland, 1910) p.38 — erroneous reference (Note: communications of Canice Mooney, O.F.M.)		
Old Kilcullen Monastery		early monastic site, chapel and cloister founded 5th century by St Patrick; plundered by Amlaibh from Dublin 938, 939, 944 burned 1114	Cill-Cuillind	53°06′28″N 6°45′38″W
Naas — Millbrook Monastery		early monastic site, founded by St Fechin of Fore, land granted by the King of Leinster	Tulachfobhair	
Naas Nunnery		early monastic site, nuns, founded by St Patrick		
Oughterard Monastery		early monastic site, nuns, founded 6th-7th century by St Brigid (not Brigid of Kildare); church and round tower largely destroyed by Vikings in 995; northwest of Kill	Uachtar-aird	53°16′40″N 6°33′56″W
Rathbride Camera		Knights Templar founded 13th century; dissolved 1308; passed to Knights Hospitallers, but exchanged with Thomas Fitx John, Earl of Kildare 1318, rectory retained by Hospitallers	Rathbrigte	
St Simon's Friary near Naas		Carmelite Friars — possibly Cloncurry		
St Wolstan's Priory		Augustinian Canons Regular — Victorine founded c.1205 by Richard, first prior, and Adam de Hereford; dissolved 1536, suppressed 15 September; granted to John Alen, Lord Chancellor, 1 December 1536, last prior allowed to remain in residence for life	Scala Caeli	53°20′40″N 6°31′06″W
Taghadoe Monastery		early monastic site, founded by St Tua (Ulstan the Silent)	Teach-tua; Teach-tua	53°21′12″N 6°36′47″W
Timolin Monastery^{#}		early monastic site	Tomolin; Tech-moling; Themolyngbeg; Tynolingbeg; Tomolyng	
Timolin Priory		Augustinian nuns — Arroasian founded c.1199 by Robert, son of Richard, Lord of Norrach; church and chapels granted by William de Piro, Bishop of Glendalough, confirmed by Henry, Archbishop of Dublin 1220; dissolved 1538; held by Edmund Eustas from 14 January 1538; granted to Henry Harrington 1581; part granted to Terence (Tirlaughe) O'Brien 1594	St Mary	52°59′03″N 6°48′30″W
Tully Abbey		Knights Hospitaller founded before 1212, confirmed by Innocent III 1212; dissolved before 1527; granted to David Sutton 1538	Black Abbey	53°08′43″N 6°54′15″W
Yeomanstown Friary		Dominican Friars — from Naas founded after 1666, transferred from Naas; transferred to Newbridge 1756		

== Map link to lists of monastic houses in Ireland by county ==
Click on a county to go to the corresponding article.	Antrim; Armagh; Down; Fermanagh; Londonderry; Tyrone; Carlow; Cavan; Clare; Cork; Donegal; Dublin; Galway; Kerry; Kildare; Kilkenny; Laois; Leitrim; Limerick; Longford; Louth; Mayo; Meath; Monaghan; Offaly; Roscommon; Sligo; Tipperary; Waterford; Westmeath; Wexford; Wicklow

== See also ==
- List of monastic houses in Ireland
