= List of national monuments in County Kildare =

The Irish state has officially approved the following list of national monuments in County Kildare. In the Republic of Ireland, a structure or site may be deemed to be a "national monument", and therefore worthy of state protection, if it is of national importance. If the land adjoining the monument is essential to protect it, this land may also be protected.

== National Monuments ==
NM#	Monument name	Description	Image	Townland	Location
681	Conolly's Folly	Folly/Obelisk		Barrogstown West	53°22′10″N 6°33′36″W
471	Castledermot Round Tower	Round Tower & Crosses		Castledermot	52°54′38″N 6°50′06″W
200	Castledermot Abbey	Friary (Franciscan)		Castledermot	52°54′31″N 6°50′14″W
394	Furness Church	Church		Forenaghts Great	53°13′25″N 6°36′09″W
629	Grange Castle	Castle		Grange West	53°22′30″N 7°04′05″W
528	Jigginstown House	House - 16th/17th Century		Jigginstown	53°12′50″N 6°40′57″W
275	Kilteel Castle	Castle & Cross		Kilteel Upper	53°13′57″N 6°31′39″W
485	Maynooth Castle	Castle		Maynooth	53°22′51″N 6°35′40″W
674	Moone High Cross	High Cross		Moone	52°58′46″N 6°49′31″W
589	Mullaghreelan Rath	Ringfort		Mullaghreelan	52°56′09″N 6°52′24″W
71	Old Kilcullen	Church, Round Tower & Crosses		Old Kilcullen	53°06′28″N 6°45′39″W
190	Oughter Ard Tower	Round Tower & Church		Oughter Ard	53°16′40″N 6°33′57″W
305	Punchestown Longstone	Standing Stone		Punchestown Great	53°11′31″N 6°37′42″W
404	Rathcoffey Castle	Castle gatehouse		Rathcoffey Demesne	53°19′53″N 6°39′53″W
503	St John's Tower	Tower, formerly part of hospital		Skenagun	52°54′50″N 6°50′16″W
70, 578	Taghadoe	Round Tower and Church		Taghadoe	53°21′12″N 6°36′48″W

== Sources ==
- National Monuments in County Kildare
