= William de Vesci (d.1297) =

- Coat of arms of William de Vesci, during the lifetime of his brother. Or, a cross sable, a label of five points Gules
- Noble family: de Vesci
- Spouse: Isabella de Perinton
- Father: William de Vesci
- Mother: Agnes de Ferrers

William de Vesci or Vescy (died 1297) was a prominent 13th-century noble. He was a son of William de Vesci and his second wife Lady Agnes de Ferrers, daughter of William de Ferrers, 5th Earl of Derby, and his first wife Sibyl Marshal.

Alternate arms of William de Vesci. Gules, a cross argent

He founded the Grey Abbey in Kildare, Ireland for the Franciscans in 1260. During the Second Barons' War campaign of 1265, William held Gloucester Castle against Prince Edward. He was pardoned afterwards and entered the service of King Henry III of England. He served against the Welsh in 1277 and later in 1282. He was appointed the justice of the forests north of the Trent in 1285.

Upon the death of his brother John de Vesci in 1289, William succeeded to the family estates, including as Lord of Sprouston in Scotland. He was also granted the Constable of Scarborough Castle between 1289 and 1292. William was sent with Antony Bek, Bishop of Durham in 1289 to represent King Edward I of England in Scotland. He also founded White Abbey, near Kildare, Ireland for the Carmelites in 1290.

Upon the death of Margaret, Maid of Norway in 1290, William became one of the competitors for the Crown of Scotland, deriving his claim from his grandmother, Margaret, illegitimate daughter of William the Lion and the wife of Eustace fitz John. William's claim was withdrawn on the eve of King Edward I of England announcing which of the claimants would inherit the throne in 1292.

With the death of his mother, Agnes on 11 May 1290, he inherited large estates in Ireland, her share of the great Marshal inheritance, including the franchise of the County Kildare with Kildare Castle and Rathangan Castle. On 12 September 1290, William was appointed Lord Justice in Ireland by King Edward I of England. His service was interrupted by complaints, with William entering the king's court in 1293 and 1294 to answer charges of slander and libel against him. Sir John FitzThomas, 4th Lord Offaly, fiercely quarrelled with William over rival claimants of the King of Connaught. FitzThomas made claims to King Edward I of England that William had accused the king of cowardice during the siege of Kenilworth Castle in 1266, and was organising a rebellion against the king. Following the report of a commission of inquiry headed by Sir William de Essendon, the Lord High Treasurer of Ireland, William lost his position as Lord Justice. William attempted to sue FitzThomas for defamation before the council at Dublin. King Edward I summoned all the parties to Westminster, however, FitzThomas did not appear, and although William requested for a judgment in his favour by reason of the default, this was not allowed, with the matter finally being resolved during the parliament in August 1295. He was summoned to Parliament as a baron in 1295.

While he regained the king's favour, William did not regain his position of Lord Justice in Ireland, however, he was restored to his former position as justiciar of the forests beyond Trent. He was sent to Gascony in December 1295 on the king's service. William surrendered his lands of Kildare in 1297 on condition of his and his brother's debts to the exchequer being forgiven. Edward I regranted his lands in Kildare for life only. William also resigned Malton Castle and his Yorkshire estates to Antony Bek, Bishop of Durham, however, he received them back for life and entailed after his death on his illegitimate son and his heirs. He also placed in charge of Alnwick Castle to Antony Bek, Bishop of Durham on trust, to restore it to his illegitimate son when he became of age. Soon afterwards William died in 1297. Since he had no surviving legitimate issue his great inheritance reverted to the Crown. The Crown granted it to FitzThomas, who became Earl of Kildare.

== Marriage and legacy ==
He married Isabella, daughter of Adam de Perinton and widow of Robert de Welles. They had issue:

- John de Vesci, d. 1295. He married Clemence de Avagour, a kinswoman of Queen Eleanor in 1286.

He also fathered an illegitimate son, William de Vescy of Kildare, with Devorgille, daughter of Donal Roe MacCarthy Mór, Prince of Desmond.

== Arms ==
During the lifetime of his brother, John, William bore arms blazoned: Or, a cross Sable, debruised by a label of five points Gules. Upon succeeding John, William bore arms blazoned Or, a cross Sable. These arms were later inherited by his illegitimate son, William.
