= Grey Abbey =

Grey Abbey may refer to:

== Monasteries ==
- Grey Abbey, Down a 12th century Cistercian monastery in County Down, Northern Ireland
- Grey Abbey, Kildare a 13th century Franciscan monastery in County Kildare, Republic of Ireland

== Human settlements ==
- Greyabbey, a town in County Down, Ireland
