= Aisling Swaine =

- Born: Ballitore, County Kildare, Ireland

Academic background
- Education: University College Dublin BA, MSc); University of Ulster (PhD)
- Thesis: Transition or transformation : an analysis of before, during and post-conflict violence against women in Northern Ireland, Liberia and Timor-Leste (2011)

Aisling Swaine (pronounced /ˈæʃlɪŋ/ ASH-ling; born Ballitore, County Kildare, Ireland) is a professor of Peace, Security and International Law at University College Dublin.

She has taught as an associate professor of practice of international affairs, focusing on women, security and development at the Elliott School of International Affairs of the George Washington University, as well as teaching at the London School of Economics.

== Education ==
Swaine attended school at Coláiste Lorcáin in Castledermot. She is a graduate of the University of Ulster, Northern Ireland (PhD 2011) and the University College Dublin (MSc 1999, BA 1998).

== Career ==
Aisling Swaine started her career as a program manager of community development at Concern Worldwide in Timor-Leste in 2001. In 2003, she stayed in the country to become a program manager for the Traditional Justice and Gender Based Violence Study at the International Rescue Committee. She continued working at the International Rescue Committee until 2006 after taking a position as program manager at the Office of the Prime Minister for the Promotion of Equality (Timor-Leste) and as a technical coordinator for the Gender Based Violence Program in Darfur, Sudan. During that time she also consulted for Concern Worldwide in Tanzania (2005).

From 2007 until 2012, Swaine was a gender equality consultant for Irish Aid in the Department of Foreign Affairs in Ireland. She concurrently advised and consulted for the United Nations IASC Gender Capacity Project of UN Women and the UN Office of the High Commissioner for Human Rights (OHCHR) from 2011 to 2012. She became a specialist in peace and security at the Peace and Security Unit of UN Women from 2012 to 2013. Swaine was a gender consultant on the United Nations Development Programme ExpRes Roster on Crisis Prevention and Recover at their Bureau for Crisis Prevention and Recovery. She was a member of UNICEF Emergency Response Roster.

Swaine was a visiting fellow at the University of Minnesota Law School in 2009 and 2011. She has also been a board member of the Centre for Global Education since 2010. She has written several articles and documents analyzing United Nations Security Council Resolution 1325.

Between 2011 and 2015, Swaine was a visiting fellow at the Transitional Justice Institute, University of Ulster. Swaine was co-editor of the organization's SSRN Paper Series (2008–2012), and co-organizer of its research seminar series (2009–2011).

Also between 2011 and 2015, she worked as an associate at Kimmage Development Studies Centre, and was named as a Gender Equality and Women's Empowerment Fellow at Human Rights Education Associates.

Swaine was named Hauser Global Fellow of the New York University School of Law in 2013.

Since 2015, she has taught courses on gender, security and development at the Elliott School of International Affairs of the George Washington University in Washington, D.C.

In 2021, she was named by A-Political as one of the world's 100 most influential people in Global Gender Policy.

In 2024, she lectures at UCD.

== Publications ==
=== Books ===
- Conflict-Related Violence against Women (2018)

Academic Peer-Reviewed Publications

- Improving the Effectiveness of Humanitarian Action: Progress in Implementing the IASC Gender Marker, Gender and Development, 20, 2 (2012)
- The ‘Long Grass’ of Agreements: Promise, Theory and Practice, International Criminal Law Review, 12 (2012)
- Assessing the Potential of National Action Plans to Advance Implementation of UN Security Council Resolution 1325 (UNSCR 1325), Yearbook of International Humanitarian Law, Vol 12 (2010)
- A Neglected Perspective: Adolescent Girls’ Experiences of the Kosovo Conflict of 1999 in Children and Youth on the Frontline: Ethnography, Armed Conflict and Displacement. Boyden and de Berry eds; Berghahn Books (2004)

=== Academic conference papers ===
- Varying the Variations: An Expanded Spectrum of Violences and the Problem of Law's Response. The Feminism and Legal Theory Project at 30: A Workshop on Geographies of Violence: Place, Space, and Time. Emory Law School (2014)
- Academia and Praxis - facilitating a pending marriage. Does the ‘research’ of the rights practitioner and the ‘activist academic’ come together? International Studies Association Conference, San Francisco, (2013)
- Variation on Variations Theory, paper to ‘Gendering Conflict and Post-Conflict Terrains, Conference at University of Minnesota Law School (2012)
- Violence and Women's Exclusion in Post-Conflict Timor-Leste, CICA-STR International Conference: Political Violence and Collective Aggression: Considering the Past, Imagining the Future, University of Ulster (2009)

=== Policy publications and reports ===
- National Implementation of the UN Security Council's women, peace and security resolutions (2013)
- A Program of Work for Gender Equality in the Emergency and Recovery Section's work (2013)
- Hannah's House E-zine, How can National Action Plans be used most effectively? (2012)
- Reparations for Conflict-related Sexual Violence (2012)
- 2012 IASC Gender Marker: Analysis of Results and Lessons Learned (2012)
- Learning Brief: Addressing GBV in Post-Conflict & Fragile States: A Case Study of Sierra Leone (2011)
- Voices of Experience: Cross-Learning Process on UNSCR 1325 (2010)
- Gender Equality Policy Review Report (2010)
- Stepping Up Ireland's Response to Women, Peace and Security: United Nations Security Council Resolution 1325 (2008)
- Traditional Justice and Gender Based Violence in Timor-Leste (2003)
