= Kildare =

Town in County Kildare, Ireland

Kildare Cill Dara
- Town
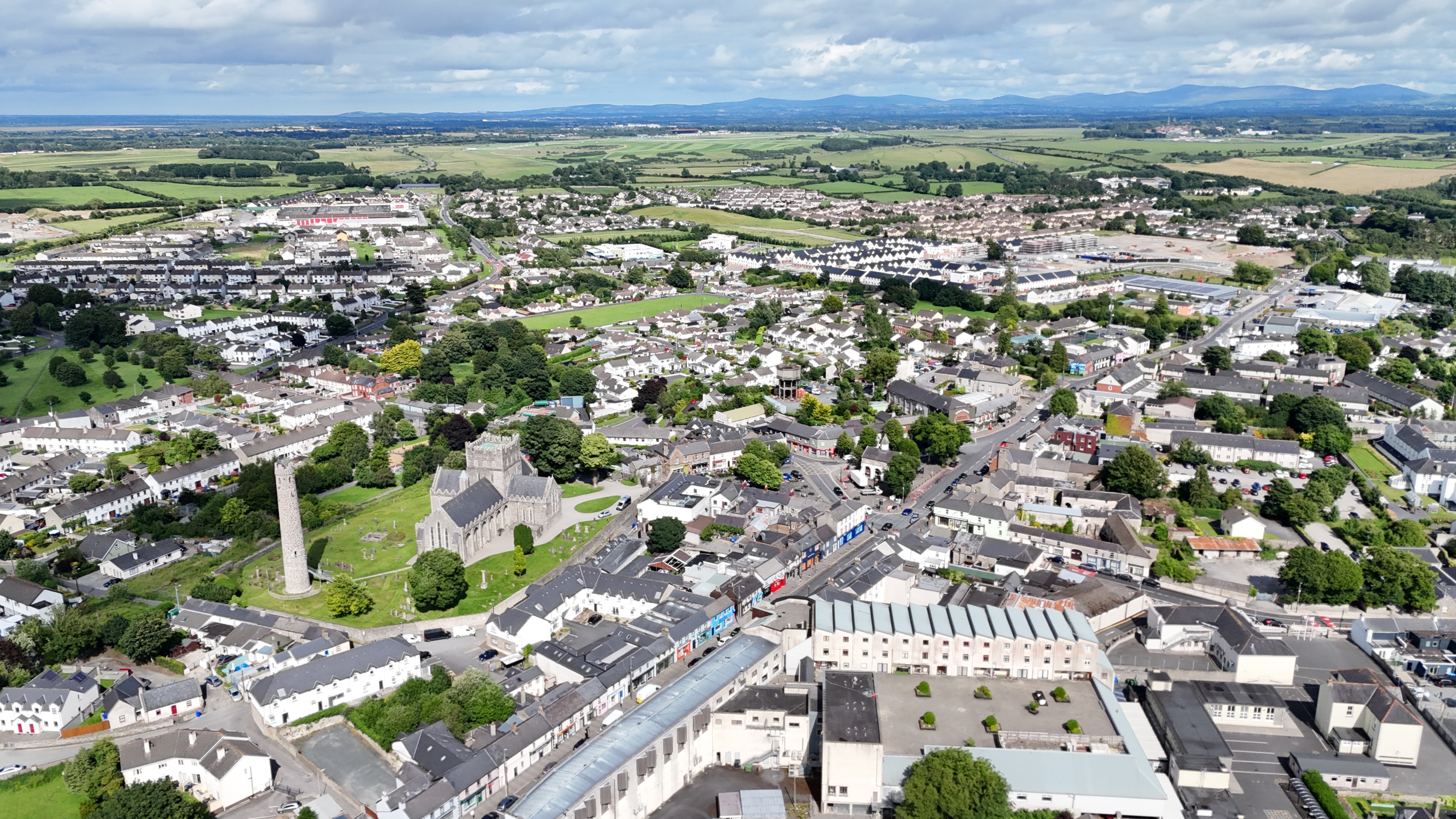
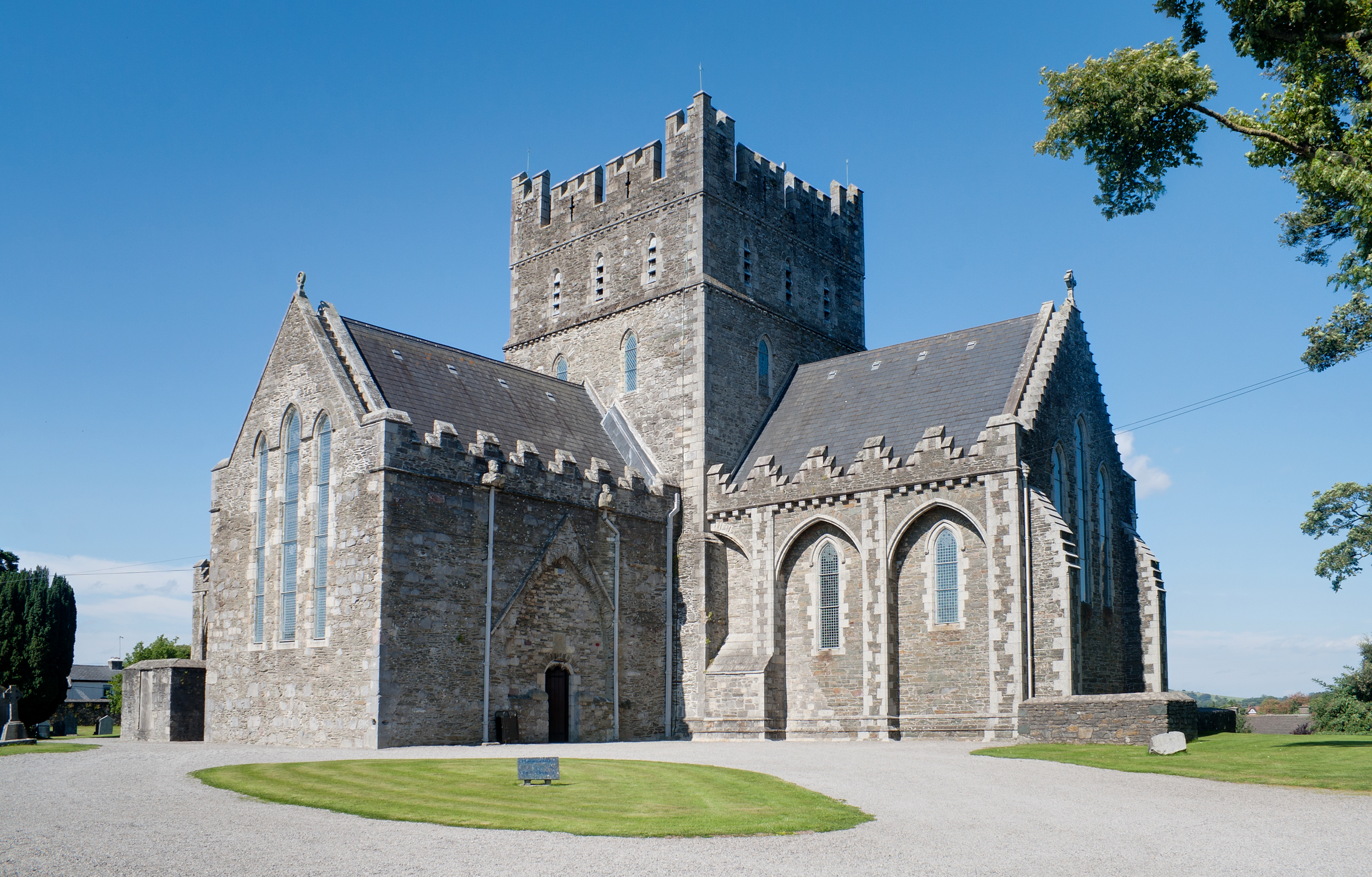
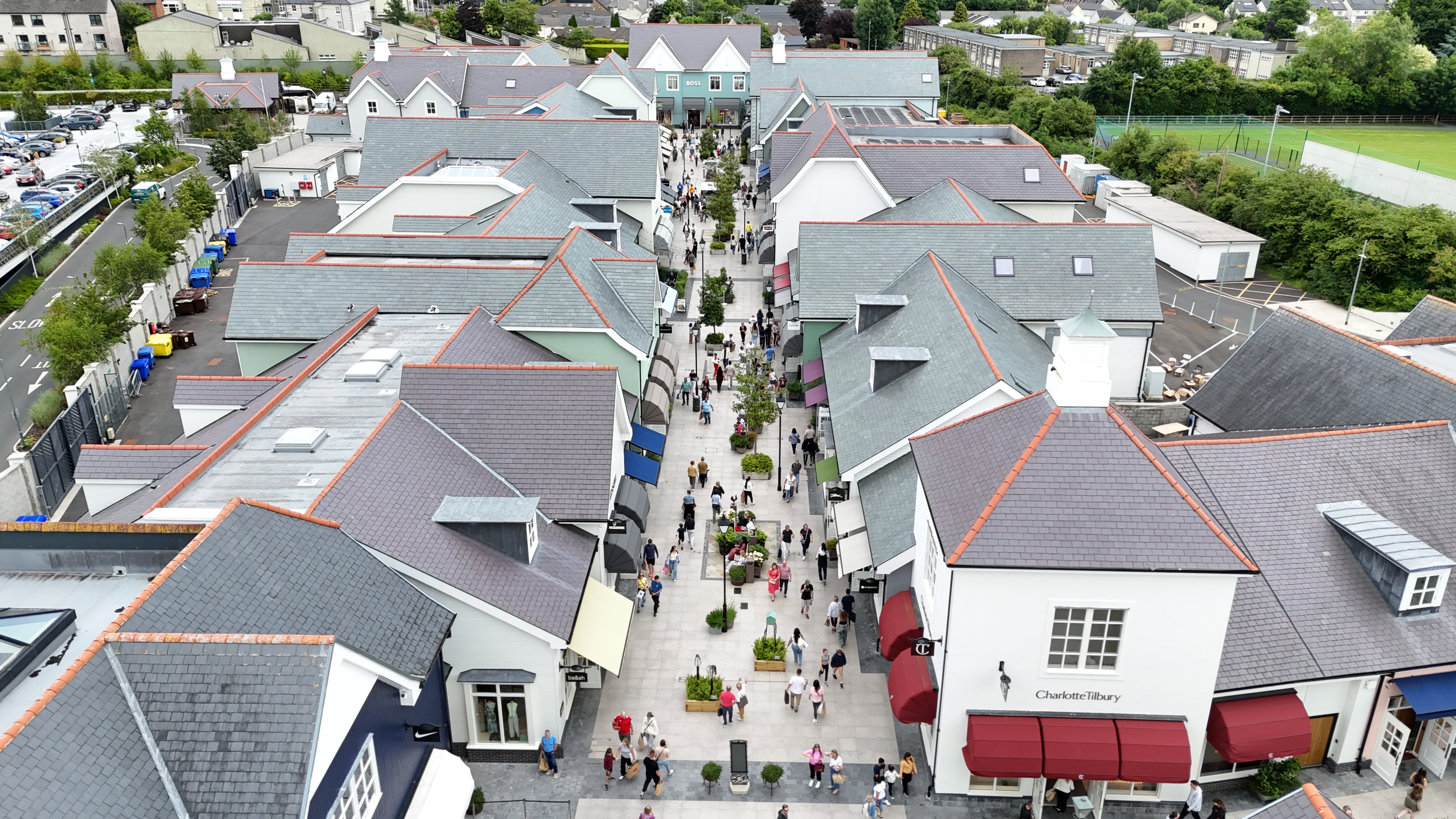
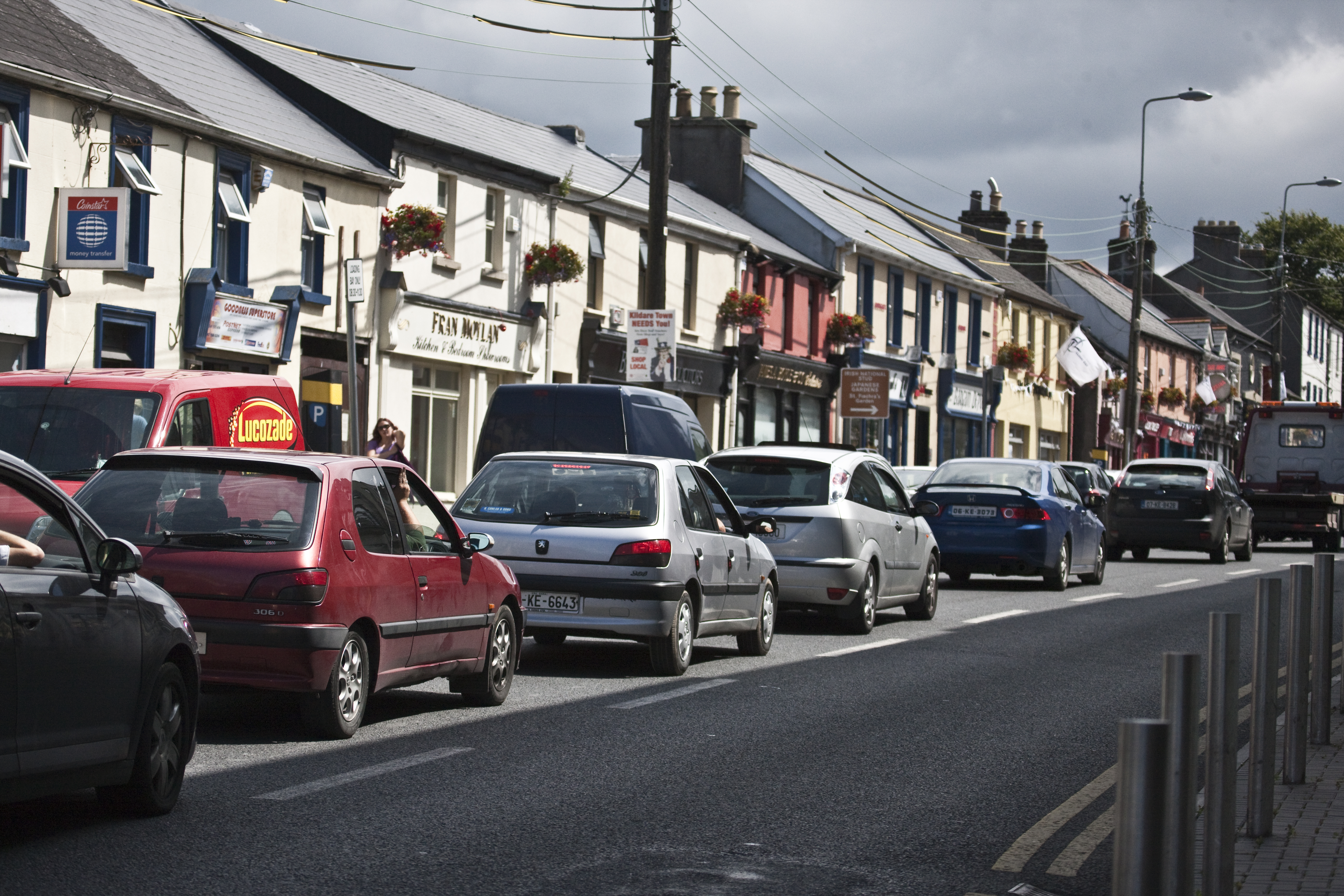
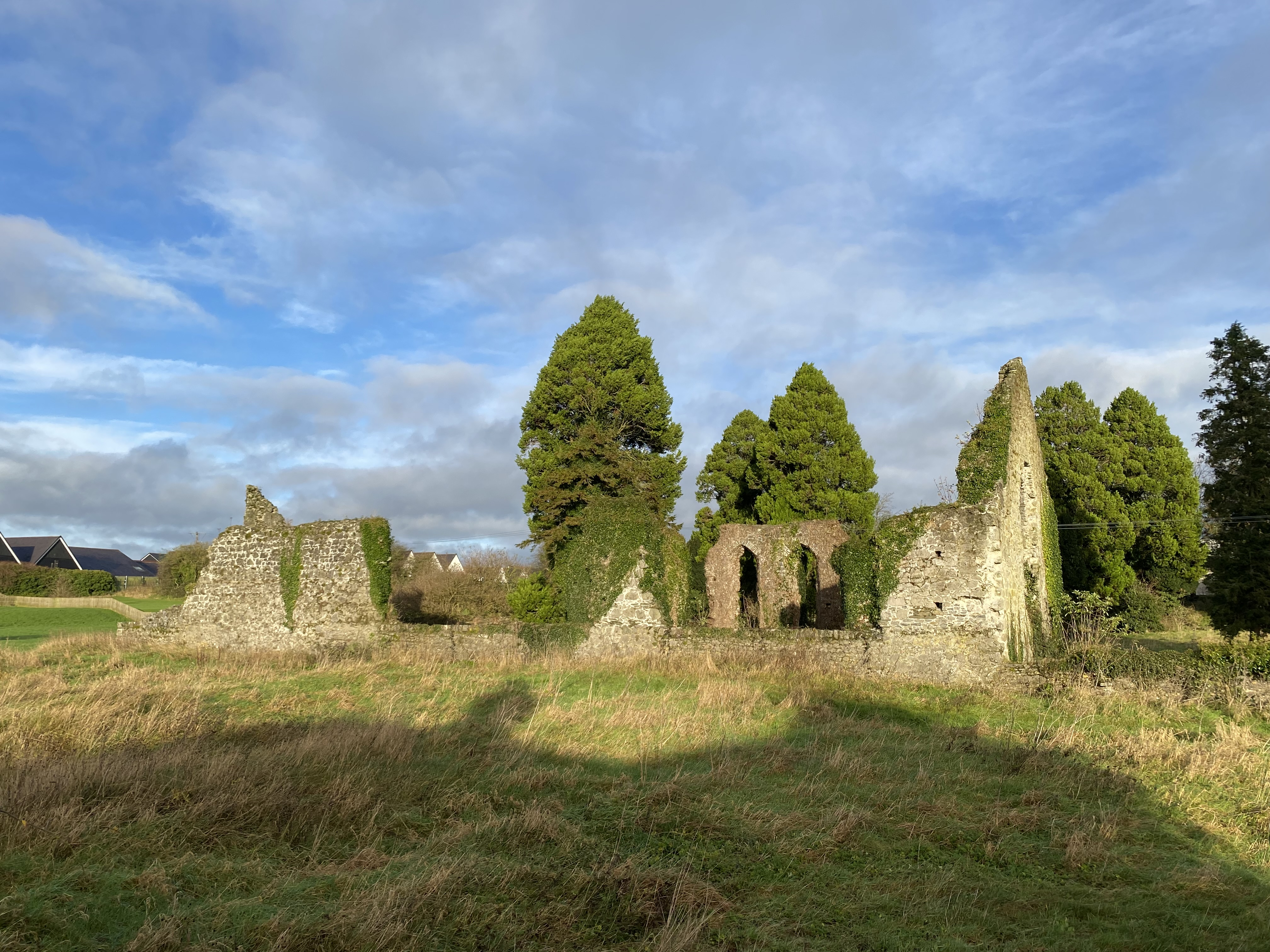
- Skyline of Kildare Kildare Cathedral Kildare Village Main street Grey Abbey

- Location in Ireland
- Coordinates: 53.15772°N 6.91128°W
- Country: Ireland
- Province: Leinster
- County: County Kildare

Area
  - Total: 3.1 km^{2} (1.2 sq mi)
- Elevation: 105 m (344 ft)

Population (2022)
  - Total: 10,302
  - Density: 3,300/km^{2} (8,600/sq mi)
- Eircode routing key: R51
- Telephone area code: +353(0)45
- Irish Grid Reference: N726124

Historical population
Year	Pop.	±%
1813	1,299	—
1821	1,516	+16.7%
1831	1,753	+15.6%
1841	1,629	−7.1%
1851	1,275	−21.7%
1861	1,399	+9.7%
1871	1,333	−4.7%
1881	1,174	−11.9%
1891	1,172	−0.2%
1901	1,576	+34.5%
1911	2,639	+67.4%
1926	2,116	−19.8%
1936	1,758	−16.9%
1946	2,109	+20.0%
1951	2,286	+8.4%
1956	2,617	+14.5%
1961	2,551	−2.5%
1966	2,731	+7.1%
1971	3,137	+14.9%
1981	4,016	+28.0%
1986	4,268	+6.3%
1991	4,196	−1.7%
1996	4,278	+2.0%
2002	6,893	+61.1%
2006	7,538	+9.4%
2011	8,142	+8.0%
2016	8,634	+6.0%
2022	10,302	+19.3%
^{[a]}

Kildare (Irish: Cill Dara, meaning 'church of oak') is a town in County Kildare, Ireland. As of 2022, its population was 10,302, making it the 7th largest town in County Kildare. It is home to Kildare Cathedral, historically the site of an important abbey said to have been founded by Saint Brigid of Kildare in the 5th century. The Curragh lies east of the town.

The town lies on the R445, some 50 kilometres (31 mi) west of Dublin – near enough for it to have become, despite being a regional centre in its own right, a commuter town for the capital. Although Kildare gives its name to the county, Naas is the county town.

== History ==
=== Founding by Saint Brigid ===
Rich in heritage and history, Kildare Town dates from the 5th century, when it was the site of the original 'Church of the Oak' and monastery founded by Saint Brigid. This became one of the three most important Christian foundations in Celtic Ireland.

It was said that Brigid's mother was a Christian and that Brigid was reared in her father's family, that is with the children of his lawful wife. From her mother, Brigid learned dairying and the care of the cattle, and these were her occupations after she made a vow to live a life of holy chastity. Both Saint Mel of Ardagh and Bishop Mac Caille have been credited with the consecration of Brigid and some companions, after which the woman established a community beneath an oak tree, on a hill on the edge of the Curragh. Hence the name Cill Dara, the church of the oak.

Not too far away, on Dún Ailinne, lived the King of Leinster who had donated the site to the holy woman. A story told was that the King had offered Brigid as much land as her cloak would cover. When she spread her garment it miraculously stretched out to embrace the entire Curragh. True to his promise, the King gave her the fertile plain, and there the new community grazed their sheep and cows.

=== Carmelite Friary (White Abbey) Church, Kildare ===
The Carmelite Friars accepted the invitation of Lord William de Vesci and came to Kildare in 1290. This same de Vesci also established the Franciscans in the Grey Abbey and built the original castle of Kildare. With the suppression of the monasteries under Henry VIII, White Abbey was surrendered on 3 April 1539. The Friars, however, continued to minister clandestinely to the people of the area during the next two centuries. When the Penal Laws were relaxed in the 1750s, the Carmelites returned to Kildare and erected a church and a school close to or on the original 1290 foundation. This eighteenth century church served the Carmelites and the people in the district for more than one hundred years. The foundation stone of the present church was laid on 8 December 1884. The architect was William Hague who designed churches in the Pugin style. The church is therefore gothic in design and the builder was John Harris of Monasterevan, who used Wicklow granite and local stone from Boston, Rathangan. The church is cruciform in plan with the nave being set off with alternating window and arched roof-truss. The transepts are defined by polished granite pillars with moulded bases and carved caps which support arches in line with the walls of the nave. The side chapels are seen from the transepts and chancel through arches springing from moulded piers which also support the large chancel arch with its polished granite corbel shafts, moulded bases and carved caps. The principal entrance doorway faces east with pillared jambs, carved tympanum and moulded arches set in a projecting porch. The tower, with its lantern belfry, extends above the level of the nave roof. It has deeply recessed windows on each face and is finished with a moulded cornice. From this point, the tapering spire rises to a height of 40 metres and is surmounted by a cross. On the north transept wall of the church are inserted – for safekeeping – some interesting fifteenth/sixteenth century stone sculptures which came from the ruins of the Franciscan Grey Abbey. They are similar to the carvings from Great Connell and Dunfierth, also in County Kildare, and probably came from the same workshop. The stained glass in the church includes scenes from the lives of Our Lord and the Blessed Virgin Mary, from the Scapular Vision, as well as Saints Patrick and Brigid, and the four Evangelists. The rose window over the main entrance is of special interest with its centrepiece being the Prophet Elijah, the spiritual founder of the Order. The surrounding panels show St Telesphorus, St Dionysius, St Albert (Patriarch of Jerusalem), St Andrew Corsini, St Cyril of Alexandria, St Louis IX, St Angelus, and St Albert of Sicily.

In February 2016, the Carmelite Church and Friary were entrusted to the Indian Carmelites.

=== Milestone in early motorsport ===
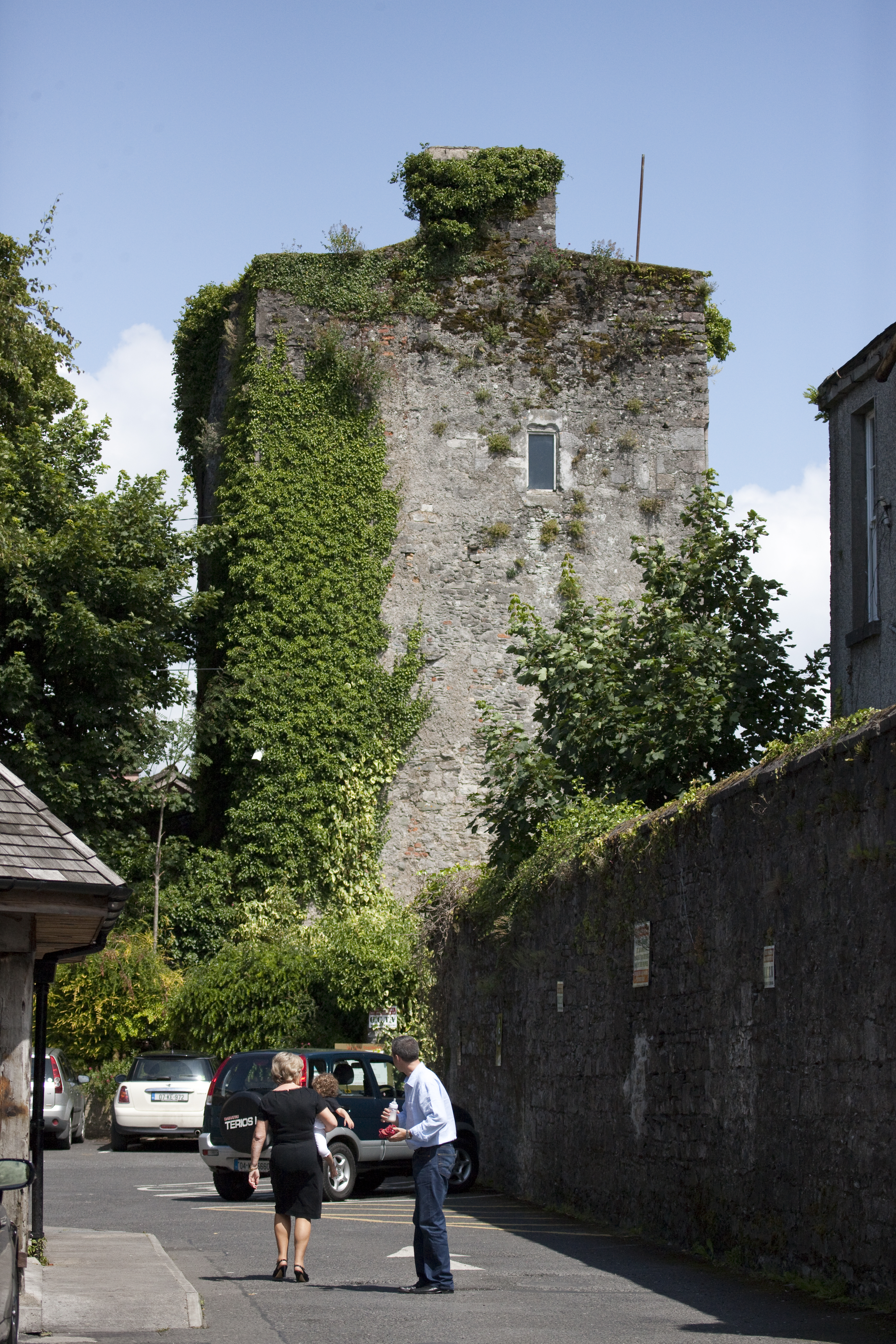
Kildare Castle

In July 1903, the Gordon Bennett Cup ran through Kildare. It was the first international motor race to be held in Britain or Ireland. The Automobile Club of Great Britain and Ireland wanted the race to be hosted in Britain or Ireland, and Ireland was suggested as racing was illegal on British public roads. The editor of the Dublin Motor News suggested an area in County Kildare, and letters were sent to politicians, newspapers, railway companies, hoteliers, and clergy to win support and amend local laws. Kildare was chosen, among other candidate venues, partly because the straightness of the roads was deemed a safety benefit. As a compliment to Ireland, the British team chose to race in Shamrock green^{[b]} which became known as British racing green. The 528 km race ran on a loop through parts of counties Kildare and Carlow, including Kildare town. It was won by Belgian racer Camille Jenatzy in a Mercedes.

== Annalistic references ==
See Annals of Inisfallen

- AI697.1 Kl. Repose of Forannán of Cell Dara. [AU 698].
- AI733.1 Kl. Repose of the daughter of Corc, coarb of Brigit.
- AI758.1 Kl. Murthán, abbots of Cell Dara, fell asleep.
- AI964.1 Kl. The plundering of Cell Dara by the foreigners of Áth Cliath; and the female erenagh died in the same year.
- AI1031.9 Cell Dara and Port Láirge were burned.

== Places of interest ==
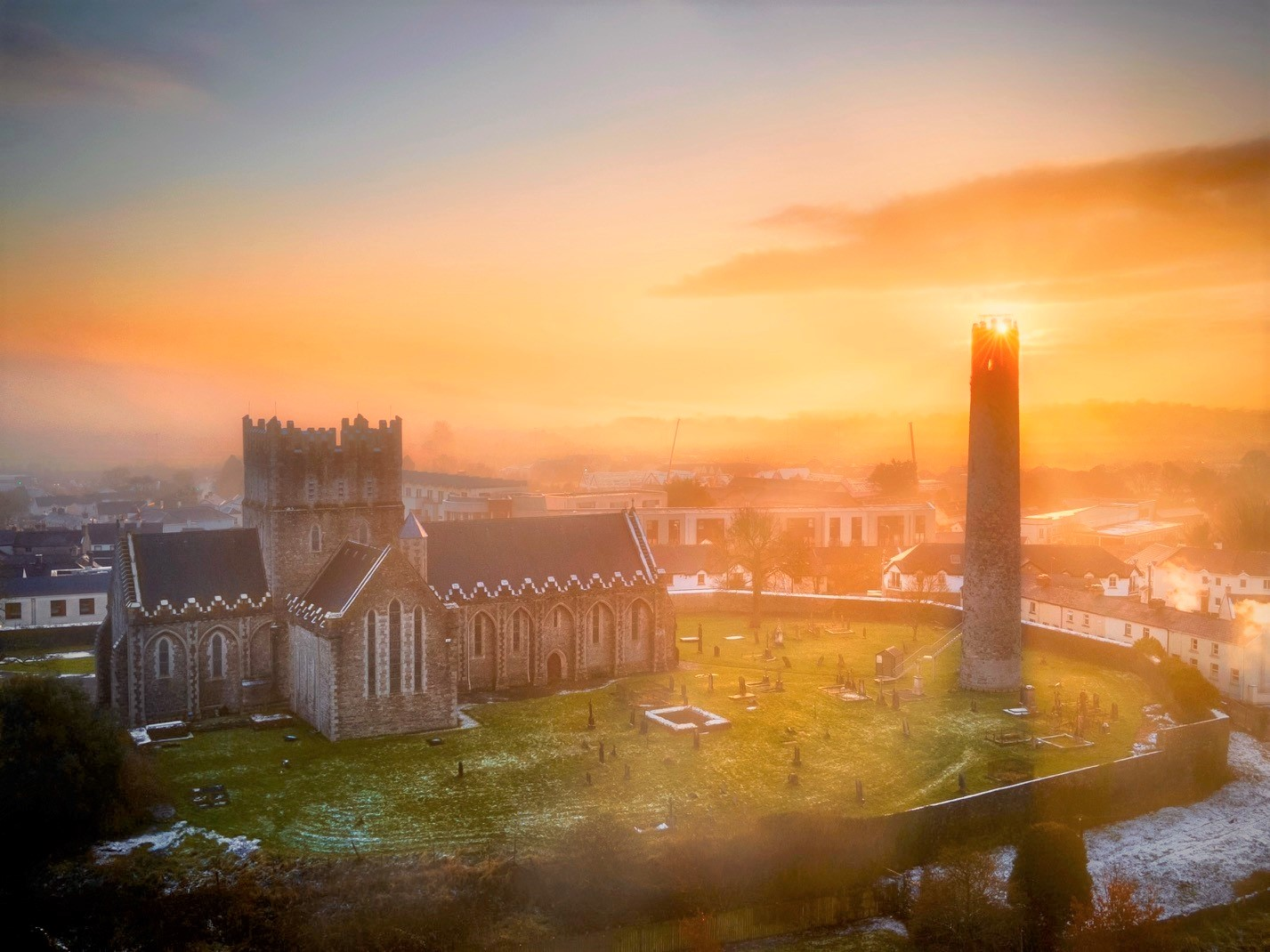
Kildare Cathedral

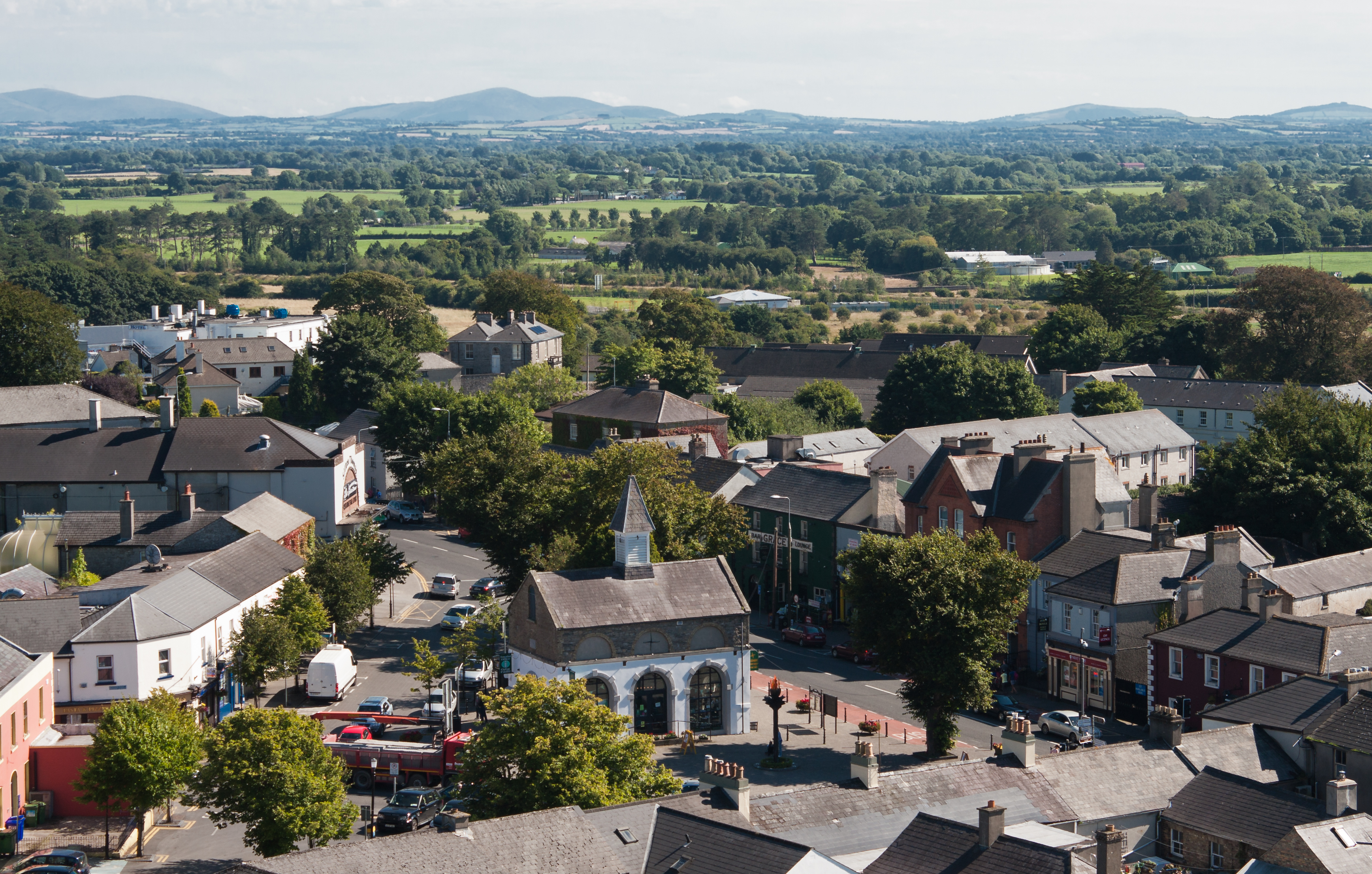
Kildare Cathedral Market Square and Heritage Centre

Kildare Town Tourist Office & Heritage Centre is situated in the Market House in Kildare Town. St. Brigid's Cathedral and the Norman Kildare Castle are also located in the town centre. Grey Abbey ruins is located around 500m south of the town centre, White Abbey is located 450m northwest of the town centre and Black Abbey is located 2km southeast of the town centre.

On the outskirts of the town are St Brigid's Well and Father Moore's Well (the latter on the Milltown Road). The Solas Bhride centre, is a modern spirituality and pilgrimage centre dedicated to Saint Brigid of Kildare that lies south of the town centre, near Tully.

Tourist destinations outside the town include the Irish National Stud and Japanese Gardens, Curragh Racecourse, and Kildare Village outlet centre. The latter is a shopping outlet located on the outskirts of Kildare and has become a shopping and tourist destination.

Kildare Barracks, on the east side of the town, closed in 1998, and the site was subsequently redeveloped for housing.

== Electoral geography ==
Kildare Town is in the Dáil constituency of Kildare South for national elections and in the local electoral area of Kildare for elections to Kildare County Council.

== Sports clubs ==
Round Towers a local GAA club, was founded in 1888 and plays in the Kildare GAA league. Kildare Town A.F.C., a local association football (soccer) club, was founded in 1966 and plays in the Kildare & District Underage League.

Cill Dara RFC plays in the Leinster League and has its grounds at Beech Park. South Kildare Soldiers (an American football team which plays in the Irish American Football League) is based at Rathbride Road.

== Transport ==
Kildare is served by the R445 and M7 roads. Dublin Coach operates services to the Red Cow (with a connection to Dublin city centre), Dublin Airport and Portlaoise. The Dublin Coach service also has a stop at the "Kildare Village" retail outlet development with connections to Dublin City Centre, Ennis, Tralee and Limerick. Go Ahead Ireland have two services through Kildare. 126 is Dublin-Kildare, 126e is Dublin-Rathangan. Kildare is also served by the 883 TFI Local Link service from Newbridge to Athy.

Kildare railway station is located on the Dublin-Cork mainline railway line, with a connection to Waterford also, and options to change down the line for Limerick, Galway and Westport and Ballina. It is served by the south western commuter service as well. From the station, a community transport company serves Milltown, Nurney and Kildangan, there is a shuttle bus service to "Kildare Village" and on race days, also a shuttle bus to the Curragh Racecourse.

== Notable people ==
- Seamus Aldridge (born 1935), Gaelic games administrator and former Gaelic football referee
- Aisling Bea (born 1984), actress, comedian and writer
- Brigid of Kildare (451–525), founder of a double monastery in Kildare
- Michèle Burke (born 1959), makeup artist and winner of two Oscars, born in Kildare
- George Cooper (1792–1867), the first Colonial Treasurer of New Zealand, born in Kildare
- Michael Corcoran (died 1819), parish priest of Kildare and afterwards Roman Catholic Bishop of Kildare and Leighlin
- Ray D'Arcy (born 1964), presenter for Ray D'Arcy Show on RTE
- David Egan (born 1999), jockey
- Mick Kearin (born 1943), international footballer

== See also ==
- List of abbeys and priories in Ireland (County Kildare)
- List of towns and villages in Ireland
- Market Houses in Ireland
- Saint-Ambroise-de-Kildare and Sainte-Marcelline-de-Kildare, two Canadian town named in part in honour of Kildare

== Notes ==
a. 1813 estimate of population is from Mason's Statistical Survey For a discussion on the accuracy of pre-famine census returns see JJ Lee "On the accuracy of the Pre-famine Irish censuses Irish Population, Economy and Society" edited by JM Goldstrom and LA Clarkson (1981) p54, in and also New Developments in Irish Population History, 1700–1850 by Joel Mokyr and Cormac O Grada in The Economic History Review, New Series, Vol. 37, No. 4 (Nov. 1984), pp. 473–488.

b. According to Leinster Leader, Saturday, 11 April 1903, Britain had to choose a different colour to its usual national colours of red, white and blue, as these had already been taken by Italy, Germany and France respectively. It also stated red as the colour for American cars in the 1903 Gordon Bennett Cup.
