= Black Abbey, Kildare =

Ruin of an abbey in Co. Kildare

Black Abbey

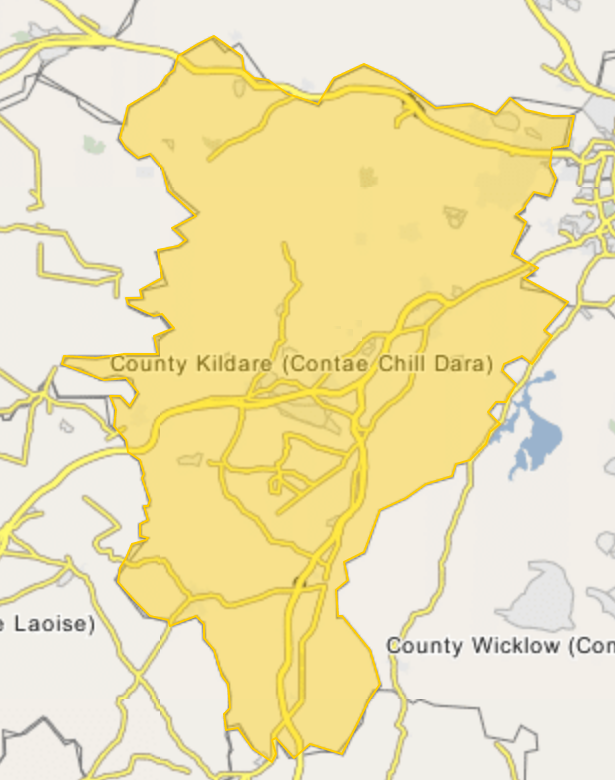
- Location within County Kildare

Monastery information
- Full name: Tully Preceptory
- Order: Knights Hospitaller
- Established: before 1212
- Disestablished: 1538

Architecture
- Status: Inactive
- Heritage designation: SMR No. KD022-034

Site
- Country: Ireland
- Coordinates: 53°08′43″N 6°54′15″W
- Public access: No

The Black Abbey, or Tully Preceptory, is a ruined Knights Hospitaller preceptory/abbey in County Kildare, Ireland. It is located around 2 km south of Kildare town centre in Tully, County Kildare and next to the national stud.

== History ==
The preceptory was founded by the Knights Templar in the early 13th century and passed down to the Knights Hospitaller in 1308. It was named 'Black Abbey' after the black habits worn by Templar members. A number of Chapters were held at the abbey. The abbey was suppressed during the Reformation in 1538 and subsequently demolished. It later formed part of the estate of Patrick Sarsfield, Earl of Lucan and Viscount of Tully. The ruins are still visible today and are currently set in an old cemetery.

== Gallery ==
Tully Preceptory and cemetery

Front side of the tower

Old ruined wall with window

Information sign next to the ruins

== See also ==
- White Abbey, Kildare
- Grey Abbey, Kildare
