= Coláiste Lorcáin =

School in County Kildare, Ireland

Coordinates: 52°54′35″N 6°50′21″W

Information
- School type: Secondary school
- Established: July 1982; 44 years ago
- Principal: E. Gaughran
- Website: colaistelorcain.com

Coláiste Lorcáin is a secondary school located in the town of Castledermot, County Kildare, in Republic of Ireland.

The current principal is E. Gaughran.

== History ==
The school was established in July 1982 as a result of an amalgamation between the Vocational School, Castledermot and St. Mary's Secondary School. The school is dedicated to St. Laurence O'Toole, the patron saint of the Arch Diocese of Dublin, who was born in the parish of Castledermot around the year 1123.

In October of 2009, the school received attention from the Irish Independent for their developing theatrical performance of South Pacific, being noted as a school with a reputation for good plays.

In May of 2022, it was announced the school would expand with 6 new classrooms, 2 of which would be special educational units.

On 26 March 2026, Coláiste Lorcáin won the award for Impact Film for their film The Truth Is Plane to See.

In 2023, the Malaysian Embassy gave thanks to the school for their participation in an active foreign exchange program between a partnering Malaysian school.

== Administration ==
The school is under the direction of a Board of Management which includes representatives of the Sisters - The Poor Servants of the Mother of God, Kildare Vocational Education Committee, parents of students, and teachers of the school. Castledermot is situated on the main Dublin - Waterford road approximately 10km North of Carlow town.

== Athletics ==
The Coláiste Lorcain Junior Rugby team won the Leinster Junior Development Cup in 2009.

== Alumni ==
- Aisling Swaine, professor.
