= Rathangan Castle =

Castle in Ireland, demolished in the 18th century

Rathangan Castle was a castle in Rathangan in County Kildare, Ireland. Built by the O' Connors, the castle was demolished in the 18th century.
