= Kildare Castle =

Ruined castle in Kildare Town, County Kildare, Ireland

Coordinates: 53.1572°N 6.9091°W

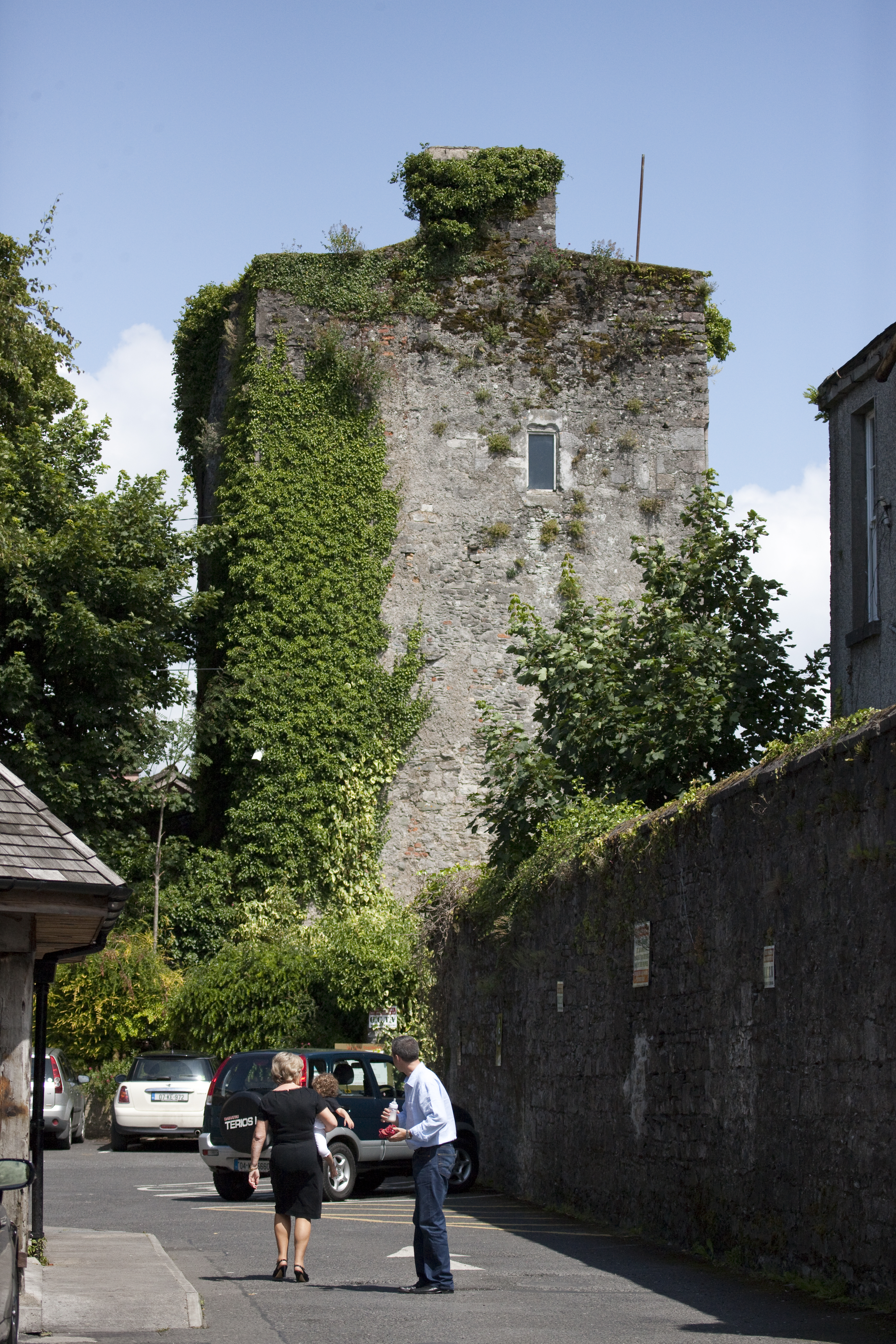
The Castle of Kildare

Kildare Castle is a ruined castle located at Kildare in County Kildare, Ireland. Built in the 12th century as a motte and bailey castle by Richard de Clare, 2nd Earl of Pembroke. The remains of a tower are the only above ground remains of the castle.
