= Mullaghreelan Rath =

Archaeological site (ringfort) in County Kildare, Ireland

- Ráth Mhullach Raoileann (Irish)
- Mullachreelan
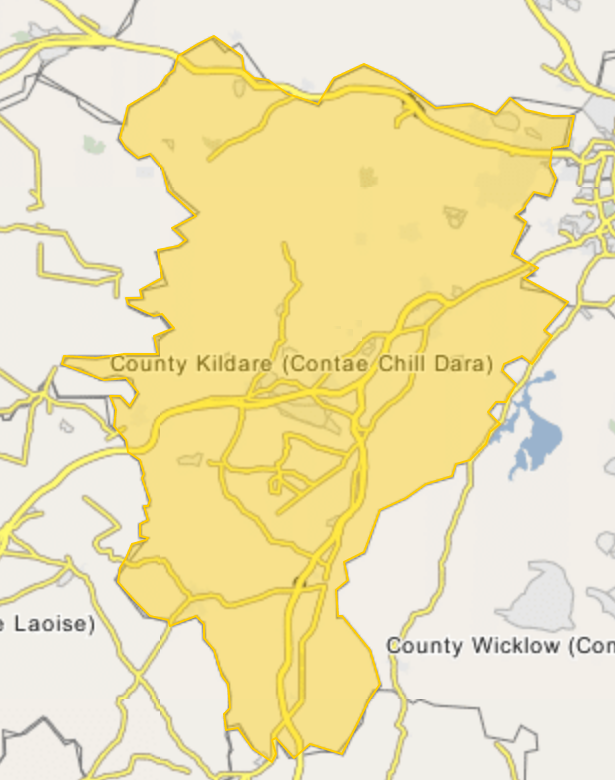
- Location within County Kildare
- 52.935953°N 6.873419°W
- Type: rath
- Periods: Bronze Age
- Location: Mullaghreelan, Kilkea, County Kildare, Ireland

Site notes
- Material: earth
- Area: 6,600 m^{2} (71,000 sq ft)
- Diameter: 92 m (302 ft)

Designations
- Designation: National Monument

Mullaghreelan Rath (Irish: Ráth Mhullach Raoileann) is a ringfort (rath) and National Monument located in County Kildare, Ireland.

== Location ==
Mullaghreelan Rath is located at a height of 170 m (560 ft), overlooking the River Greese. It is surrounded by Mullaghreelan Woods, a Coillte forest.

== History and archaeology ==
The rath was mentioned in ancient Irish manuscripts in association with the Kings of Leinster: rí Raithleand (King of Reelan) is mentioned twice in Lebor na Cert. In 1854, a celt was found in the rath. In 1861, a Bronze Age burial urn was discovered nearby.
