= Castledermot Round Tower =

10th-century round tower in County Kildare, Ireland

- Cloigtheach Dhíseart Diarmada
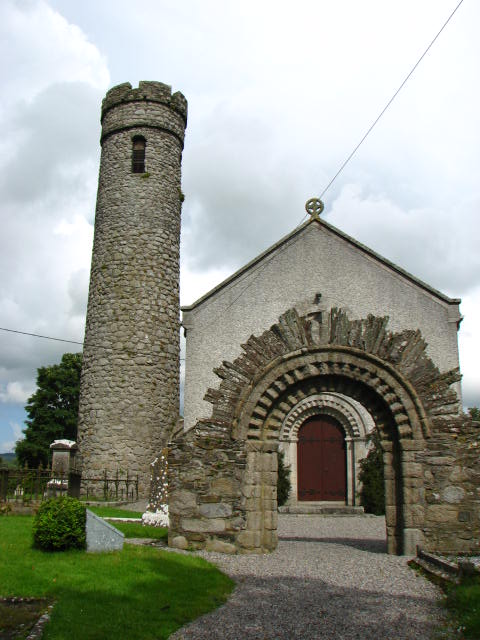

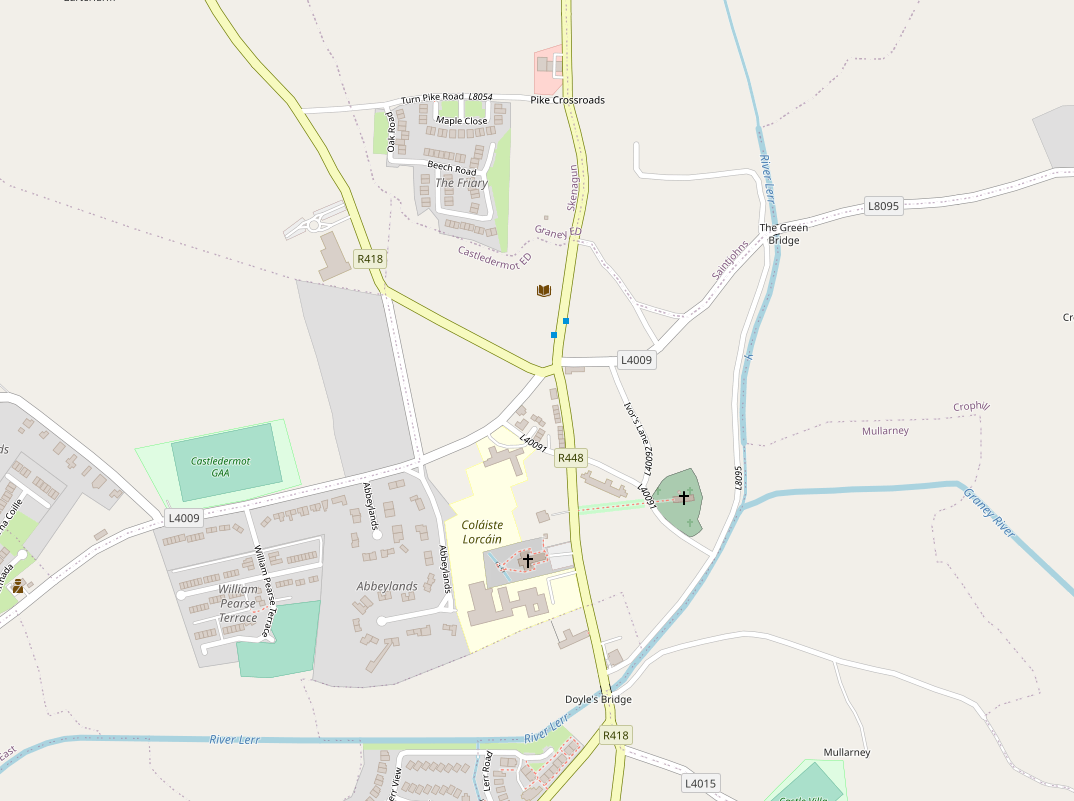
- Location within Castledermot Location within Ireland

Religion
- Affiliation: Church of Ireland

Location
- Location: Church Lane, Castledermot, County Kildare, Ireland
- Interactive map of Castledermot Round Tower
- Coordinates: 52.910458°N 6.834934°W

Architecture
- Style: Irish round tower
- Groundbreaking: 10th century

Specifications
- Height (max): 20 m (66 ft)
- Materials: Granite

Castledermot Round Tower is a 10th-century round tower in Castledermot, County Kildare, Ireland. The tower, and the high crosses nearby, are a National Monument.

== Building ==
The tower is complete, although the original cap has been replaced with battlements. It is composed of rounded granite boulders embedded in mortar.

== History ==
Castledermot was founded as a monastic settlement c. 800 AD. The bishop-poet Cormac mac Cuilennáin was buried here in AD 938 and the round tower was probably built around that time. The community ceased to exist some time after 1073.

== The crosses ==
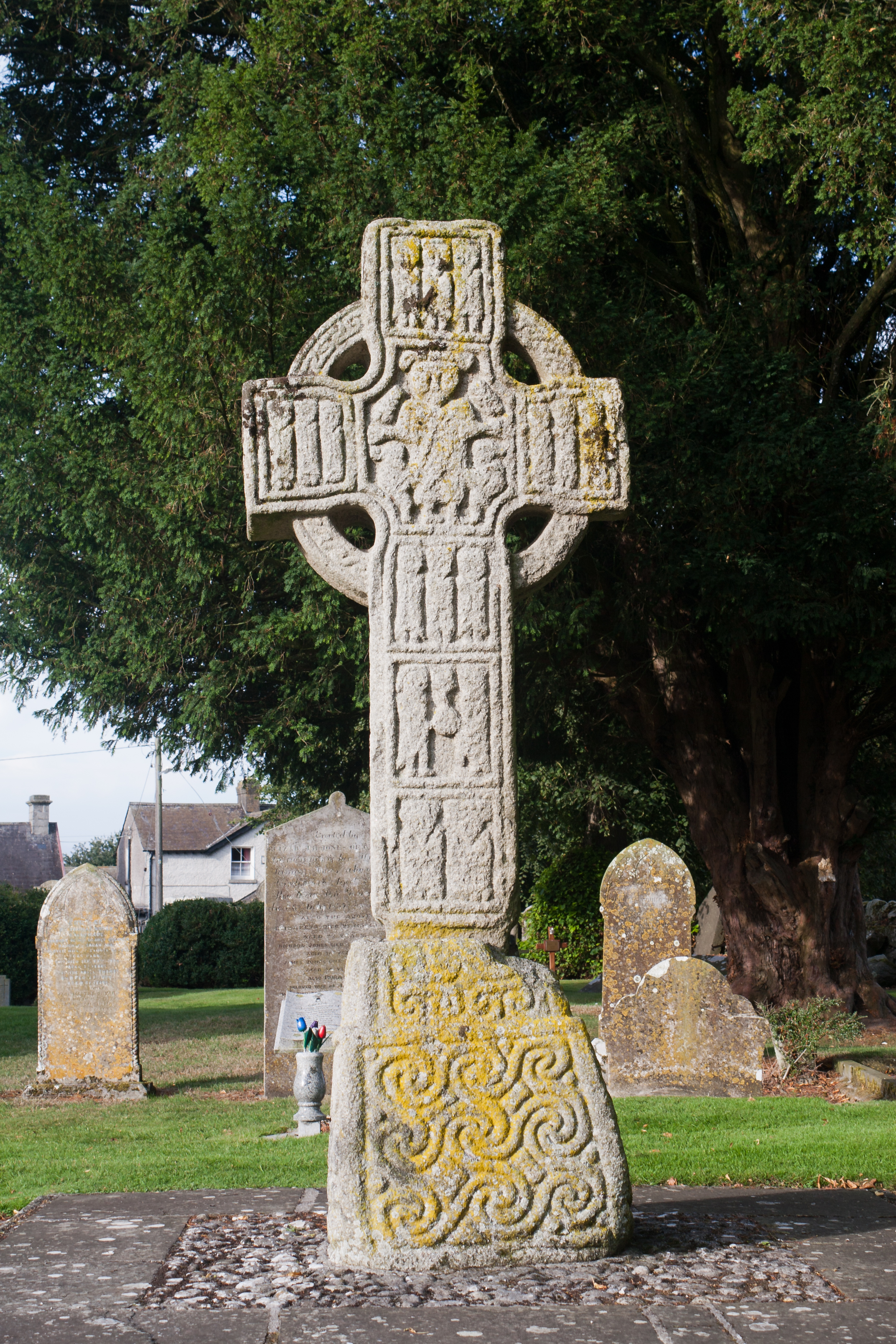
East face of the north cross

There are two high crosses:

- The north cross depicts David, the Binding of Isaac and the miracles of Jesus.
- The south cross depicts the Arrest of Jesus, Daniel, and Adam and Eve.
