= Castledermot Abbey =

Ruined Franciscan friary in Kildare, Ireland

- Mainistir Dhíseart Diarmada
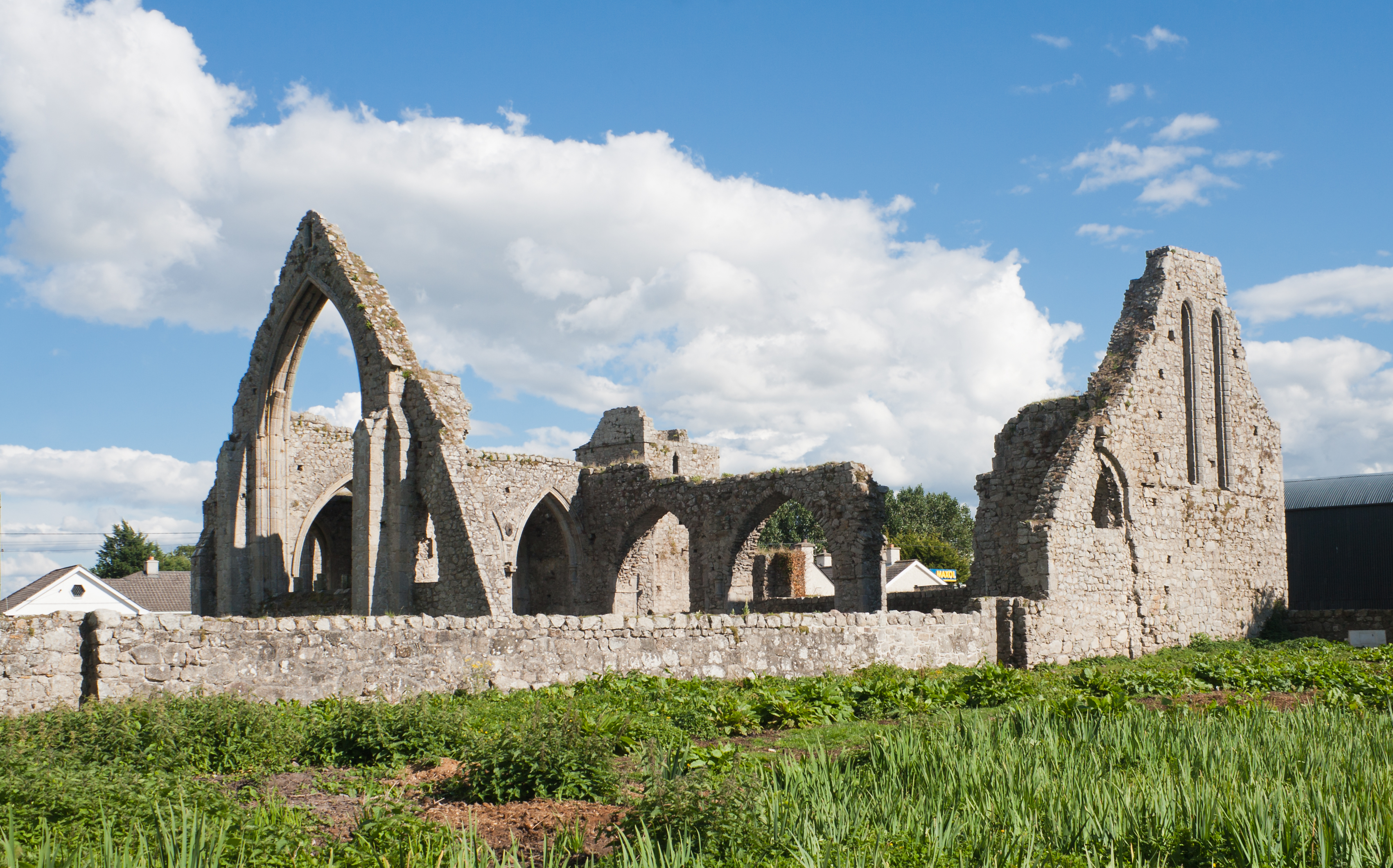

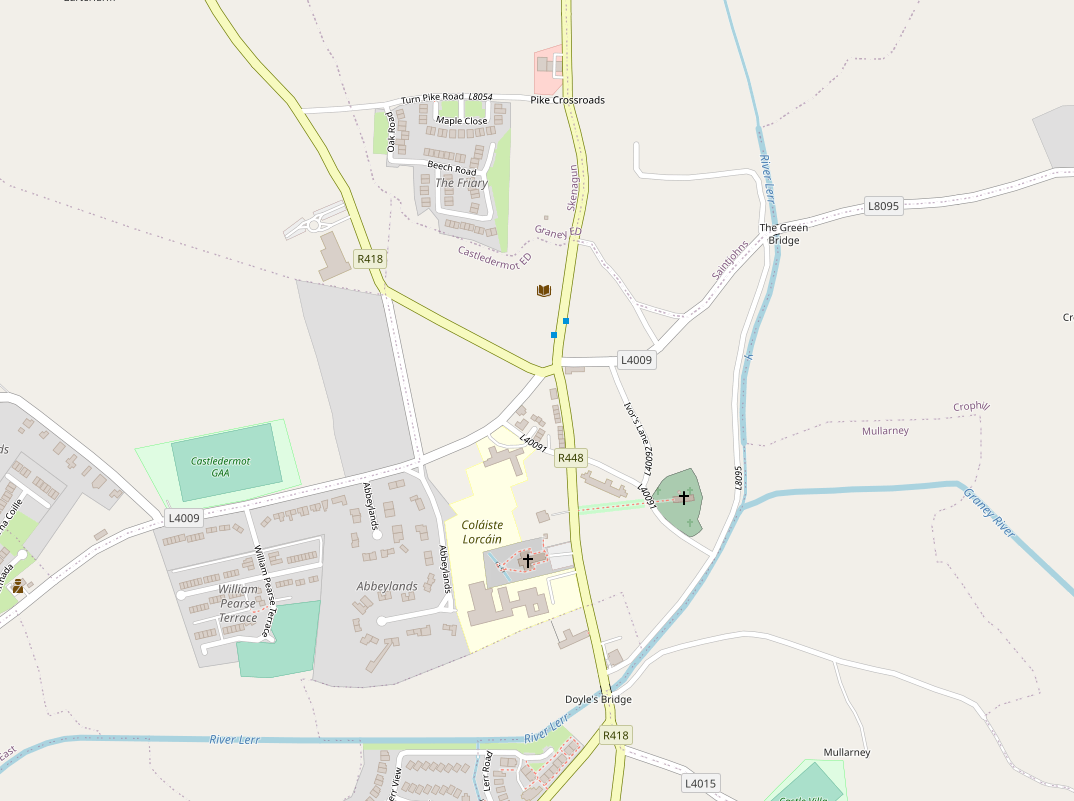
- Location within Castledermot Location within Ireland
- Interactive map of Castledermot Abbey

Monastery information
- Other name: Castledermot Friary
- Order: Franciscan
- Established: Prior to 1247
- Disestablished: 1540
- Diocese: Kildare and Leighlin

People
- Founder: Walter de Riddlesford II (d.1238/9)

Architecture
- Functional status: Abandoned
- Heritage designation: National Monument
- Style: Irish Gothic
- Groundbreaking: Prior to 1247

Site
- Location: Abbey Street, Castledermot, County Kildare, Ireland
- Coordinates: 52.908556°N 6.837141°W
- Public access: yes

Castledermot Abbey (Irish: Mainistir Dhíseart Diarmada) is a ruined Franciscan friary in Castledermot, County Kildare, Ireland. It was founded at some point before 1247. A previous monastery had been founded on the same site by Diarmait, a son of Áed Róin, King of Ulster, in the ninth century AD.

== History ==
The abbey sits on the site of a previous monastery founded by Diarmait, a son of Áed Róin, King of Ulster, in the ninth century AD. The friary was founded by Walter de Riddlesford the Younger at some point prior to 1247.
