= White Abbey, Kildare =

Ruined abbey in County Kildare, Ireland

White Abbey
- St. Mary's Priory of Kildare
- Kildare Carmelite Church
- An Mhainistir Liath
- Front façade of the present church

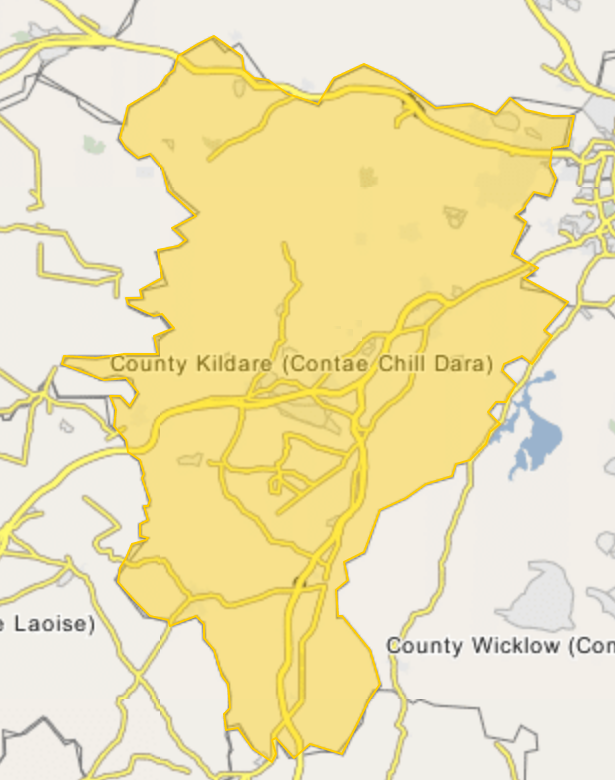
- Location within County Kildare
- 53°09′34″N 6°55′00″W
- Country: Ireland
- Denomination: Roman Catholic
- Religious order: Carmelites
- Website: https://carmelites.ie/kildare/

History
- Founded: 1290
- Founder: William de Vesci
- Dedication: Blessed Virgin Mary

Architecture
- Heritage designation: NIAH No.11817079
- Architect: William Hague
- Style: Gothic Revival
- Years built: 1887

Specifications
- Height: 140 ft. (42.6m)

Clergy
- Priest: Fr. Gerard Breen

White Abbey or St. Mary's Priory of Kildare is a ruined abbey near the town of Kildare, County Kildare, Ireland. The present-day church on the site is also referred to as the Kildare Carmelite Church.

== History ==
It was founded around 1290 by William de Vesci and was dedicated to the Blessed Virgin Mary. It was run by Carmelite friars and was named White Abbey after the white Carmelite habits. It is described in documentation as 'An Mhainistir Liath' the monastery was extended towards the south some time later. Some of the Earls of Kildare are buried there. The presence of the Carmelites and the Franciscans in Kildare are attested by a late thirteenth-century poem 'The Land of Cockayne':

"There is a right fair abbey, both of white monks and of grey."

In the early stages of the Geraldine revolt of 1534, some of the silver and gold plates from Maynooth Castle were sent to Carmelite Abbey in Kildare. Friars were therefore considered hostile to the English king at the time. The friars were expelled and buildings were demolished by the agents of King Henry VIII in 1539 during the Reformation. The land was thereafter sold to David Sutton Tully in 1543. The Friars well is located a short distance west of the abbey. Mounding of the ground indicate the presence of domestic accommodation for the friars.

The Carmelites returned in the 18th century and have maintained a community there since. A smaller chapel was erected close to the abbey's site, which remained in use until the present church and housed only one or two friars. The present church on site was built in 1887 and no remains of the original abbey are visible anymore. The foundation stone of the church was laid on 8th December 1884. The church was designed by architect William Hague in Pugin style. The stained glass in the church include scenes from the bible and Jesus, as well as Saint Patrick, Brigid, the prophet Elijah and the four evangelists. The spire rises to a height of 140 ft (42.6m) surmounted by a cross.

== Gallery ==
Side view of the present church

Interior of the church

The nave and the gallery

Altar piece depicting pietà

South transept rose window depicting Saint Joseph

== See also ==
- Carmelites
- Grey Abbey
- Kildare
