= Castledermot =

Town in County Kildare, Ireland

Castledermot Díseart Diarmada
- Town
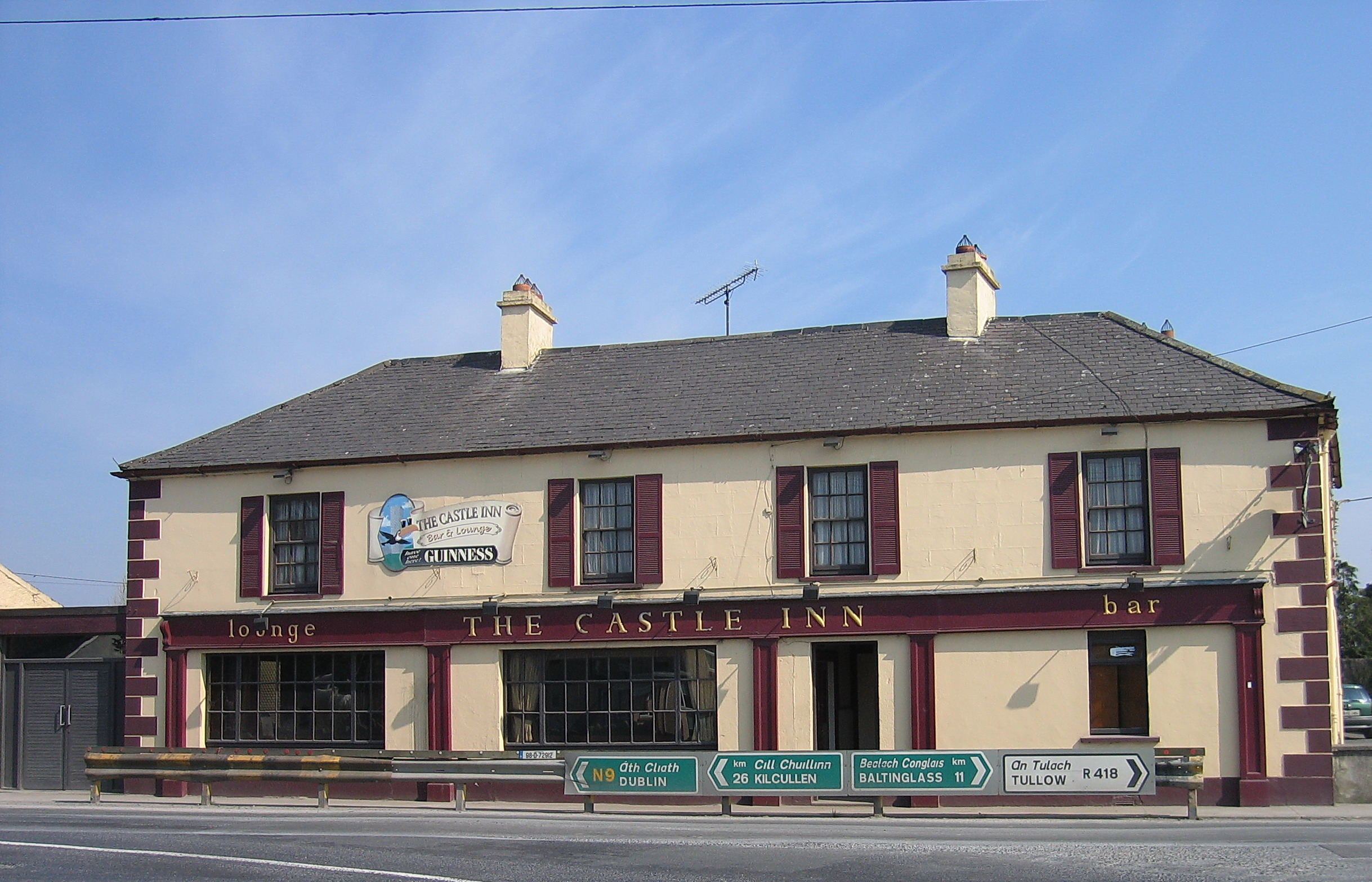
- The Castle Inn, Castledermot at the R448/R148 junction

- Location in Ireland
- Coordinates: 52°54′43″N 6°50′15″W
- Country: Ireland
- Province: Leinster
- County: County Kildare

Population (2022)
  - Total: 1,685
- Time zone: UTC+0 (WET)
  - Summer (DST): UTC+1 (IST (WEST))
- Irish Grid Reference: S780852

Castledermot (Irish: Díseart Diarmada, meaning 'Dermot's Hermitage') is an inland town in County Kildare, Ireland, about 75 km (47 mi) from Dublin, and 10 km (6.2 mi) from the town of Carlow. The N9 road from Dublin to Waterford previously passed through the village but upon completion of a motorway bypass in 2010, it was re-designated the R448. The town is in a townland and civil parish of the same name.

== Name and early history ==
The name "Castledermot" combines two separate histories, one secular (Castle), one ecclesiastical (Dermot via '’Dísert Díarmaita / Diarmada'’).

The secular element "Castle" derives from the town's having a castle and walls from the 13th century. This came about under the Anglo-Norman control of Walter de Riddlesford (fl. 1150 – d. 1226), baron of Kilkea, Co Kildare. According to the website Tuatha:

"The territory in which Díseart Diarmada stood was granted to Walter de Riddlesford in about 1171, and the earliest evidence for the existence of a borough here is a charter for his ‘vill of Trisseldermod’ between 1225 and 1233. Tristledermot, as it was then known, was one of four walled town in county Kildare.The only upstanding remains of the town wall can be seen at Carlowgate, where part of the gate survives and fragments can be glimpsed in the overgrown stream bank nearby. However, the location of the original circuit is fairly well understood thanks to a combination of historic maps, excavations and geophysical surveys. Records suggest there were at least three named gates accessing the town: Dublingate to the north, Carlowgate to the south-west and Tullowgate to the south. There may have been a fourth gate to the east, near the Fair Green. By the late 1500s Castledermot was still regarded as one of the four principle towns of Co Kildare, but it saw considerable decline in the seventeenth century. It was burned by Cromwellian forces in 1650 and the castle and town walls dismantled."

According to Irishwalledtownsnetwork: "As with many other Irish walled towns, Castledermot was an older settlement which was taken over by the Anglo-Normans. Given control of the area in the 12th century, Walter de Riddlesford reorganised and expanded the town. By 1295 Castledermot had a seven-year murage grant which allowed the townspeople to collect a toll from anyone entering the town. The toll money was then used to fund the building of the walls which were completed in 1302, giving Castledermot protection and its distinctive pear shape."

The ecclesiastical element of Castledermot refers to the 9th century monastery founded in Castledermot by Diarmait ua Áedo Róin (d.825). The word dísert (from Latin dēsertus) literally means solitary place, retreat, asylum, hermitage (dísert or dil.ie/16806). The site of the monastery is believed to be that of the current St James’ Church in Castledermot.

The establishment of the monastery by Diarmait ua Áedo Róin may be understood in the context of a centuries-old political affiliation between the Uí Bairrche of Leinster and Ulster, and the Dál Fiatach of Ulster. At some point in the late 5th or early 6th century an Uí Bairrche king in north Leinster, Cormac mac Diarmata, an exact contemporary of the missionary Columbanus (d.615), retired to Comgall's monastery at Bangor (Bangor Abbey), Co Down - a monastery associated with the Dál Fiatach. It is in this context that, about 200 years later (812?), Diarmait ua Áedo Róin, a great-grandson of an Ulster Uí Bairrche king, Bécc Bairrche, founded the monastery at Castledermot as a daughter house of Bangor Abbey. Diarmait ua Áedo Róin was the grandson of Áed Róin, a Dál Fiatach king in Ulster. Diarmait was a member of the Céili Dé (Culdee) movement, a reform movement within the Christian Church.

According to Tuatha:

"One of the most famous historical characters associated with the monastery is Cormac mac Cuileannán, bishop and king of Munster and author of important texts such as Cormac's Glossary. He was a student here and was buried next to his old master, Snedghus, after he died in the Battle of Ballaghmoon, just 7km SW of Castledermot, in AD 908."

== Later history ==
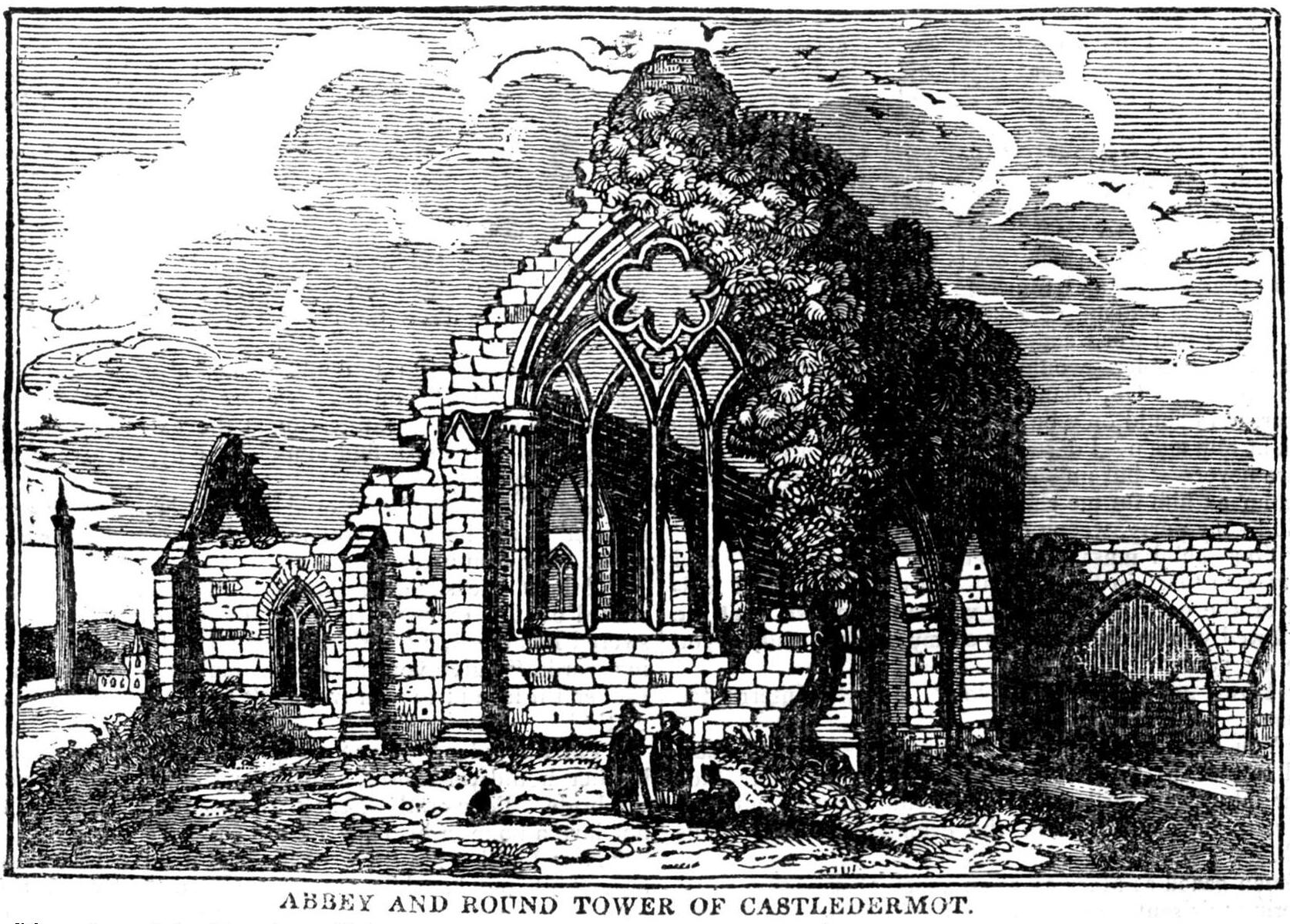
A view of Castledermot in 1834, Dublin Penny Journal

The earliest known Irish Parliament met at Castledermot on 18 June 1264. Also, the oldest intact window in Western Europe can be found in the town, being part of the ruins of a Franciscan Monastery. The window, although large, is only stonework. St. Laurence O'Toole, (1128 - 1180) or Lorcán Ua Tuathail, was born at Castledermot.

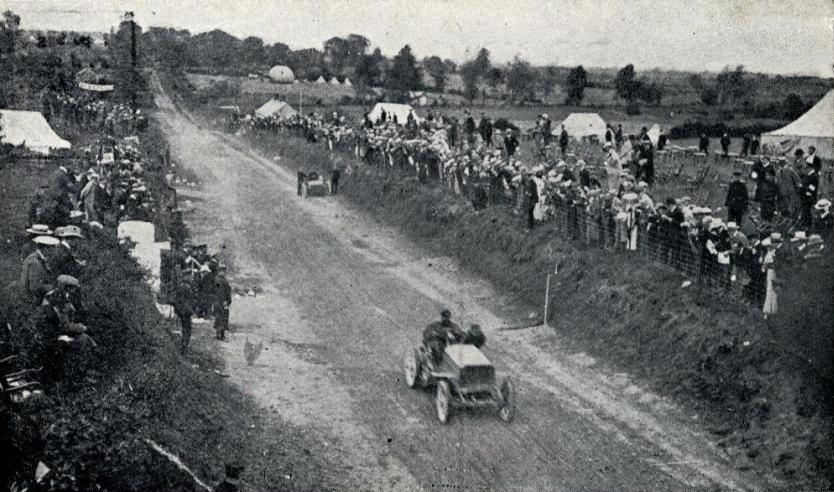
1903 Gordon Bennett Trophy. René de Knyff, driving his Panhard to second place, passes Alexander Winton repairing the Winton Bullet 2 on the first lap.

In July 1903 the Gordon Bennett Cup passed through Castledermot.

== Public transport ==
=== Bus ===
The main bus route serving Castledermot is J.J. Kavanagh & Sons route 736 providing a limited number of daily services to Carlow, Waterford, Dublin and Dublin Airport. This service was reduced in 2015 which impacted local commuters. Visitors who wish to visit Castledermot outside of the small number of services that pass through the town must alight at slip road off the M9 for Carlow and avail of a taxi service into Castledermot. South Kildare Community Transport operate a route from Castledermot to Athy twice a day each way Mondays to Fridays inclusive. Bus Éireann used to serve Castledermot more frequently, but the solitary Sunday evening journey was withdrawn in 2015. Castledermot is also served by bus route 880 operated by Kildare Local Link. There are several buses each day including Sunday linking the town to Carlow and Naas as well as villages such as Moone in the area.

=== Rail ===
Carlow railway station is approximately 11 kilometres distant. Athy railway station is around 14 kilometres distant.

== Demographics ==
Historical population
Year	Pop.	±%
1821	1,336	—
1831	1,375	+2.9%
1841	1,416	+3.0%
1851	666	−53.0%
1861	883	+32.6%
1871	727	−17.7%
1881	675	−7.2%
1891	536	−20.6%
1901	451	−15.9%
1911	388	−14.0%
1926	247	−36.3%
1936	276	+11.7%
1946	408	+47.8%
1951	449	+10.0%
1956	599	+33.4%
1961	551	−8.0%
1966	557	+1.1%
1971	583	+4.7%
1981	805	+38.1%
1986	792	−1.6%
1991	741	−6.4%
1996	733	−1.1%
2002	726	−1.0%
2006	887	+22.2%
2011	1,398	+57.6%
2016	1,475	+5.5%
2022	1,685	+14.2%

The population of the town was 887 at the time of the 2006 census, a 22% increase over the figure recorded in 2002. As of the 2022 census, the population of the village was to 1,685 people.

== Notable features ==
The River Lerr (a tributary of the larger River Barrow, the second longest river in Ireland) flows through the town.

In the town, there are various remains including Castledermot Round Tower, Saint John's Tower and two well-preserved granite high crosses and the ruins of Castledermot Abbey, a Franciscan friary. 5 km (3.1 mi) away is Kilkea Castle, once the residence of the Duke of Leinster, but now a hotel and health farm. The north high cross contains scenes from both the new and old testaments and has interlocking spirals. The south high cross is taller and its west face if is filled with biblical scenes. The castle was built by the English Norman Hugh de Lacy in 1180, and later passed to the Fitzgeralds. Gerald FitzGerald, 11th Earl of Kildare, is said to have practised magic in Kilkea Castle which earned him the nickname "the Wizard Earl".

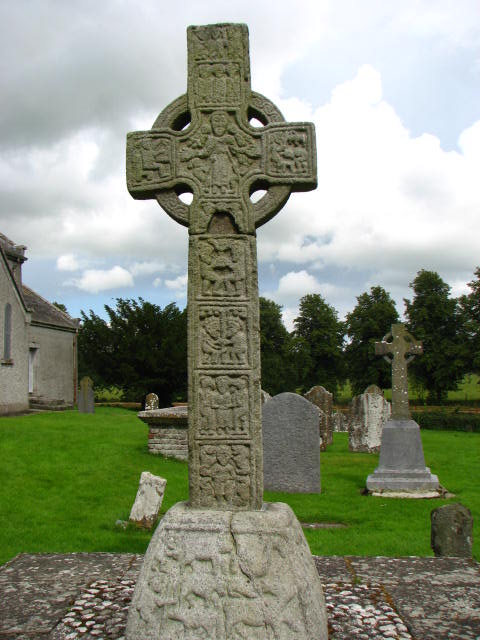
Castledermot high cross

== Education ==
There are two schools in the town. The national school, Scoil Diarmada, is on the Athy road out of Castledermot and was opened in January 2009. It has two floors, and an elevator for easier access for disabled people. The secondary school, Coláiste Lorcáin, is located on the main street.

== Sport ==
Sporting organisations in Castledermot include the local GAA team, Castledermot GAA (which has men's and women's teams), and plays Gaelic football and hurling. There are also local Gaelic handball, basketball, soccer and cricket teams.

Castle Villa, whose grounds are at Mullarney Park, are one of the most successful soccer teams in Leinster. Two of the club's most successful teams of the past were the 1979 team which won the Counties Cup and the Sheeran Cup winners of 1984. More recently, the club was crowned Lumsden League Cup Champions in 2016 and have been Kildare Senior League champions on several occasions.

== See also ==
- List of towns and villages in Ireland
- List of abbeys and priories in Ireland (County Kildare)
