= Saint John's Tower (Castledermot) =

Former hospital bell tower, County Kildare, Ireland

- Túr Naomh Sheáin
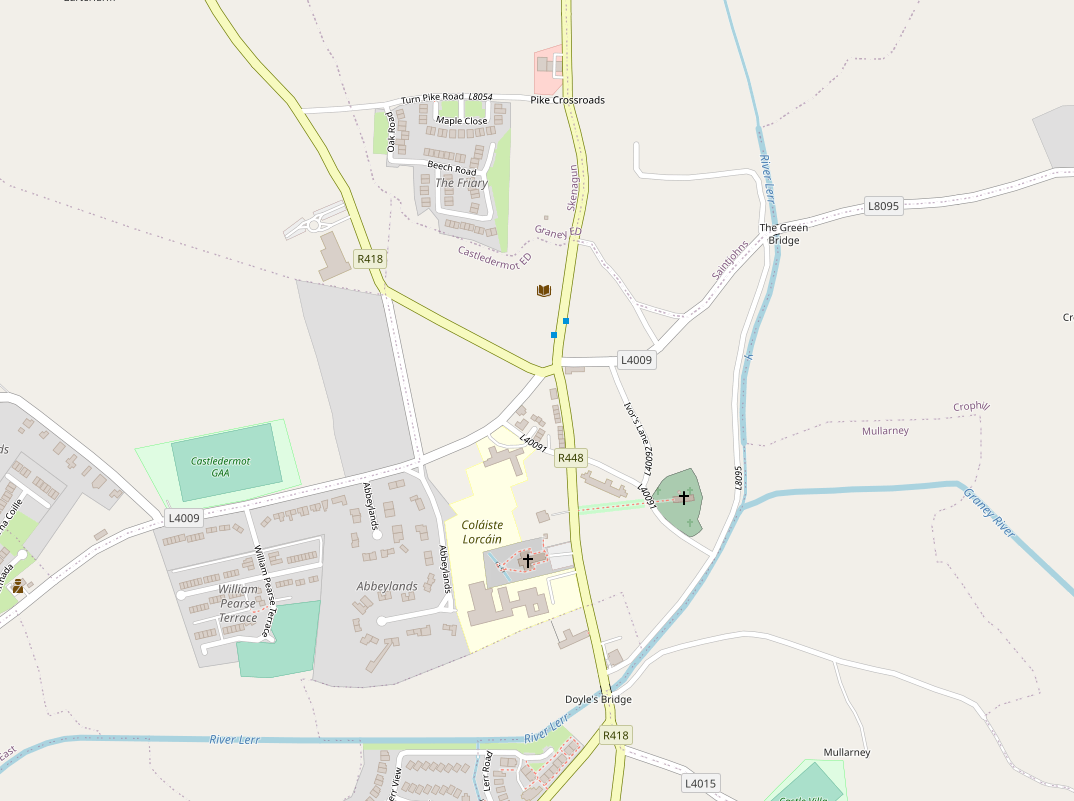
- Location within Castledermot Location within Ireland

Religion
- Affiliation: Catholic

Location
- Location: Skenagun, Castledermot, County Kildare, Ireland
- Interactive map of Saint John's Tower
- Coordinates: 52.914024°N 6.837788°W

Architecture
- Style: Norman
- Founder: Walter de Riddlesford
- Groundbreaking: 1210

Specifications
- Height (max): 10 m (30 ft)
- Materials: Stone

Saint John's Tower, also called the Pigeon Tower, is a tower in Castledermot, County Kildare, Ireland. A former bell tower, it is all that remains of a medieval leper hospital and is a National Monument.

== Location ==
Saint John's Tower is located on the northern end of the Main Street, Castledermot.

== History ==
The Priory and Hospital of St John the Baptist was founded by Walter de Riddlesford and his wife in 1210, just outside the Dublin gate of the walled town of Castledermot. It was occupied by the Crutched Friars (Fratres Cruciferi) until its dissolution in 1541.
