= Grey Abbey, Kildare =

Ruined Franciscan abbey in Ireland

Grey Abbey
- An Mhainistir Liath
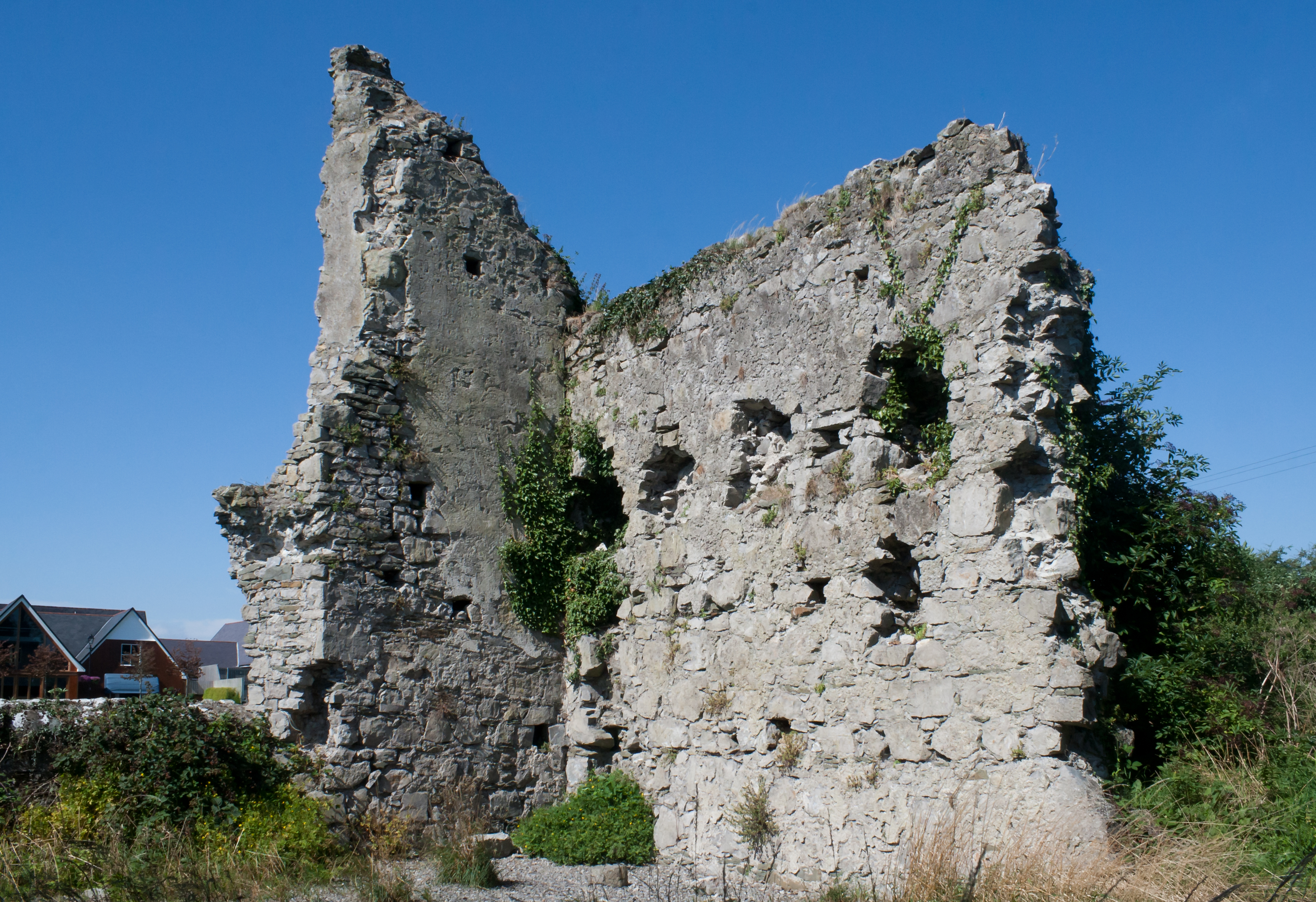
- Northwest corner of the ruin
- Interactive map of Grey Abbey

Monastery information
- Order: Franciscans
- Established: 1260
- Disestablished: 1539

People
- Founder: William de Vesci

Architecture
- Status: Inactive

Site
- Public access: Yes

Grey Abbey (Irish: An Mhainistir Liath) is a ruined Franciscan abbey/monastery in County Kildare, Ireland. Founded in 1260, the Kildare poems were likely written in the abbey. It is one of the three abbeys of Kildare, the other two being White Abbey and Black Abbey.

== History ==
The abbey was founded in 1260 by William de Vesci and the Franciscan order, however it was completed by Maurice FitzGerald, Lord of Offaly. Gerald FitzGerald, 5th Earl of Kildare was buried here alongside 7 other Earls of Kildare. The friary was extended in 1350 under the patronage of Joan de Burgo. A manuscript which is the original source of the Kildare poems was likely written in the Grey Abbey in the early 1300s. The abbey was named after the grey habits worn by members of the Franciscan order.

In 1539 the abbey was suppressed and was completely abandoned by 1547. The abbey is known to have been a complex of multiple buildings including a church, a belfry, a dormitory, a hall, three chambers, a kitchen and a cemetery.

Archaeologists excavated the site in 2004 and discovered various medieval pottery shards, metals and glass under the soil.

== Gallery ==
Grey Abbey ruins and cemetery with plaque

East window

Side view of the ruins
