= List of monastic houses in Ireland =

This is a list of the abbeys, priories, friaries and other monastic religious houses in Ireland.

This article provides a gazetteer for the whole of Ireland.

== Links to individual county lists ==
To navigate the listings on this page, use the map or the table of contents. Alternatively, for listings which include the geographical coordinates and online references specific to the listed establishments, or if the entire listing is difficult to navigate, follow the links here (these links are also provided in the headings to each county in the main listing on this page):

== Overview ==
=== Article layout ===
The list is presented alphabetically by county. Foundations are listed alphabetically within each county.

Click on a county to go to the corresponding section

Communities/provenance: shows the status and communities existing at each establishment, together with such dates as have been established as well as the fate of the establishment after dissolution, and the current status of the site.

Formal name or dedication: shows the formal name of the establishment or the person in whose name the church is dedicated, where known.

Alternative names: some of the establishments have had alternative names over the course of time. In order to assist in text-searching such alternatives in name or spelling have been provided.

In this article smaller establishments such as cells and notable monastic granges (particularly those with resident monks) and camerae of the military orders of monks (Templars and Hospitallers) are included. The numerous monastic hospitals per se are not included here unless at some time the foundation had, or was purported to have, the status or function of an abbey, priory, friary or preceptory/commandery.

=== Abbreviations and key ===
The sites listed are ruins or fragmentary remains unless indicated thus:
*	current monastic function
+	current non-monastic ecclesiastic function
^	current non-ecclesiastic function
=	remains incorporated into later structure
#	no identifiable trace of the monastic foundation remains
~	exact site of monastic foundation unknown
ø	possibly no such monastic foundation at location
¤	no such monastic foundation
≈	identification ambiguous or confused

Locations with names in italics indicate probable duplication (misidentification with another location)
or non-existent foundations (either erroneous reference or proposed foundation never implemented).

Trusteeship denoted as follows:
NIEA	Scheduled Monument (NI)
NM	National Monument (ROI)
C.I.	Church of Ireland
R.C.	Roman Catholic Church

== List of houses by county ==
=== Northern Ireland ===
==== County Antrim ====
(For references and location detail see List of monastic houses in County Antrim)

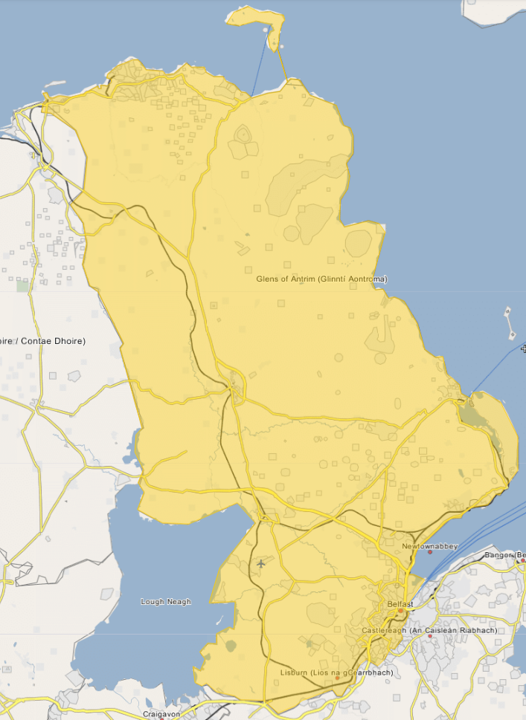
Locations of monastic houses in County Antrim

Foundation	Image	Communities & Provenance	Formal Name or Dedication & Alternative Names
Aghnakilla Monastery ^{ø}		supposed early monastery dissolved before 11th century	Achad-cinn; Achad-na-cille; Aughnakeely
Antrim Monastery		Gaelic monks possibly founded by St Comgall of Bangor; plundered 824; plundered 1018; destroyed 1147	Oen-truib; Aen-truib; Aentreb; Aontruibh; Eantrobh; Oentrebh
Ardclinis Friary ^{ø}		tradition of house of Franciscan Friars, Third Order Regular — evidence lacking	
Armoy Monastery ^{ø}		supposed early monastery, founded by St Olcan; dissolved before 11th century	Airthir-maige; Domnach-; Ethirmoy
Ballycastle Friary ^{≈}		building called 'abbey', apparently built 1612 by Randal Mac Donnell, Earl of Antrim; standing until the Reformation; probably Bonamargy Friary (v. infra)	
Ballyprior Priory		Premonstratensian Canons — from Woodburn (community founded at Woodburn before 1326); transferred here 1542-3; dissolved after 1565	Magee Island Priory
Bonamargy Friary, Ballycastle		Franciscan Friars, Third Order Regular founded c.1500 (c.1475) by Rory MacQuillan, Lord of Reute (or Mac Donell); dissolved 1584; burned 1589; granted to the descendants of the founder Franciscan Friars, First Order Regular repaired & re-occupied at the petition of Father Conor Mac a'Bhaird, as a rest centre for missionaries 1626–1642, restored 1931; (NIEA)	Bunanmargaigh
Carrickfergus Abbey		Premonstratensian Canons daughter house of Dryburgh; priory founded before c.1183; raised to abbey status 1212; dissolved after 1320-6; succeeded by Woodburn (v. infra)	
Carrickfergus Friary ^{#}		Franciscan Friars Minor, Conventual founded 1232–48 by Hugh Lacy, Earl of Ulster; Observant Franciscan Friars reformed 1497; dissolved 1540; restored by Queen Mary 1557; friars expelled 1560; granted to Sir Edmund Fitzgerald, who assigned it to Sir Arthur Chichester, who built a castle on site 1610; used as a munitions store, rebuilt as Joymount House 1618; new house built by friars 1626	Carrac-fergusa; Cragfargas; Gracfergos; Grafergosensis
Church Island Monastery, Lough Beg			
Church Island Abbey, Lough Beg			
Clondrumalis Abbey ^{~≈?}		Premonstratensian Canons, possibly located in County Antrim, possibly Woodburn	Woodburn?
Cluain Monastery ^{ø+}		supposed early monastery founded by St Oclan; dissolved before 11th century; C.I. parish church built on site	Kilcluain; Cell-chluaine
Connor Monastery		church probably founded early 6th century by Mac Nissi (St Macnisse) (Oengus or Coemahan Breac); episcopal diocesan cathedral; diocese united with Down 1453	Coinnere; Condere; Coinnee
Cranfield Monastery		early monastic site, patron St Eoghan; by tradition the burial place of St Olcan	Maigi Cremc; Cremh-caille; Ecclesiaa de Crewill
Culfeightrin Monastery ^{ø}		supposed early monastery founded 5th century by St Patrick; dissolved before 11th century	Culechtrann; Kilfeutre; Magherintemple
Drumeeny Monastery ^{ø}		supposed early monastery early monastic site, monks; founded 5th century by St Patrick, who left bishop Enan in charge; dissolved before 11th century	Druim-findich; Druim-indeich; Druim Findich, Enán in; inDruim [Fh]indich, Enán; Ecclesia de Drum-Indich; Killeena; Gobbin's Heir Castle
Druim La Croix Abbey		Premonstratensian Canons daughter house of Dryburgh; founded before c.1250; dissolved after 1320-6; succeeded by Woodburn (v. infra)	Druim La Croix; White Abbey
Drumtullagh Monastery		grange founded 5th century by St Patrick	Telagh-Ceneoil-Oingusa; Tulach
Dundesert Monastery		early monastic site, monks; coptic tradition?	Disert Ilidh? Disert Uilaigh?
Dunseverick Monastery		early monastic site, monks founded 5th century by St Patrick; first taken by Norsemen 871; destroyed 926	Dun-sebuirgi; Dun-sobairche
Erdamh Monastery ^{~}		early monastic site, suggested to be County Antrim (Note: Mervyn Archdall, Monasticon Hibernicum, 1786, however not mentioned by W. Reeves, Ecclesiastical Antiquities of Down, Connor and Dromore, 1847)	
Glenarm Friary		Franciscan Friars, Third Order Regular founded 1465 by Robert Bissett, cousin of Robert Bissett, Provincial of the Third Order in Ireland; dissolved during the reign of Queen Elizabeth?; granted to Alexander MacDonnell, ancestor to the Earl of Antrim; site now occupied by St. Patrick's C.I. parish church	Gleann-arm
Glenavy Monastery		early monastic site founded by St Patrick; patron St Aidan, son of Colga; by tradition the burial place of the three daughters of St Comgall founder of Bangor Monastery	Laathrach Patraic; Lennewy, Ecclesia de, cum capella Lettir-phadruic; Gleann Abhaich; Lann Abhaigh
Glynn Monastery		early monastic site monks; church founded 5th century by St Patrick	Glinn; Glenn-Fineachta; Glenn-Indechta
Inispollan Monastery		early monastic site, monks in existence 5th century, in the time of St Patrick	Inis-pollen
Inver Friary		Franciscan Friars, Third Order Regular founded 1500 by a Scottish nobleman, Phelim O'Neil; dissolved during the reign of Queen Elizabeth? also erroneously given as Inver, County Donegal; granted to James V. Claneboys	
Kells Abbey		purportedly founded before 514 (in the time of St Macnise); apparently a hermitage by 828 of Ceallach mac Condmaigh, anchorite of Disirt Ceallaigh (possible confusion with same place name in County Galway); Augustinian Canons Regular — Arroasian? founded after 1140; destroyed 1316 by Edward Bruce; rebuilt early 15th century?; dissolved 1 February 1542, surrendered to the commissioners of Henry VIII; extant remains on site of textile factory	St Mary; The Augustinian monastery of Saint John the Baptist (1415) ____________________; Disert Abbey; de Diserto fonte-Conneri; Ceneles
Kilboedain Monastery ^{~}		early monastic site, monks church founded by St Boedan, abbot	Cell-baedain; Cell-buadain; Kilscoba; possibly Ballywodan in Ardquin, or Ballibodan; Eiloseoba
Kilroot Monastery		early monastic site, founded in or after 412 by St Colman who was sent by St Ailbe of Emly	Cell-ruaid; Cell-ruad
Lambeg Friary		Franciscan Friars, Third Order Regular founded c.1500 by Phelim O'Neil (or M'Donnell); dissolved before 1572, probably destroyed by O'Neil to prevent use as a fort by the English	Lambegg Friary; Limbeg Friary
Layd Friary ^{ø}	Layde Church – geograph.org.uk – 742678	tradition of church now ruined belonging to Franciscan Friars purportedly founded by the sept of McFall (Macfaull) evidence lacking; also suggested as nuns or Dominican Friars	Lead; Lede; Port Obe
Linally Monastery	erroneous reference to Lynally, County Offaly		
Linn Monastery		early monastic site, nuns	
Magheramorne Monastery		early monastic site, monks founded 5th century by St Patrick	Domnach-mor-maige-damoerna
Massereene Friary		Franciscan Friars, Third Order Regular founded 1500 by Phelim O'Neil; dissolved during the reign of Queen Elizabeth?; granted to Sir Arthur Chichester, Baron of Belfast 1621	Mas-a-rioghna; Masraona; Masseryne; Masevin
Muckamore Monastery ^{#}		Gaelic monks founded 585? (550) By St Colman Elo	Mag-comair; Moccumur; Mocmur; Mucimore; Muckmore; Mugcomuir
Muckamore Priory		Augustinian Canons Regular — Victorine founded before 1185; dissolved 1540-1; granted to the Longford family 1639; thatched house built on site 17th century replaced by house built and landscaped gardens before 1833, extant, without public access	Mag-comair; Moccumur; Mocmur; Mucimore; Muckmore; Mugcomuir
Portglenone Abbey Church *		Cistercian monks, O.C.S.O. founded 1948 from Baltinglass Abbey, Co Waterford; extant	Abbey of Our Lady of Bethlehem, Portglenone;
Portmore Monastery; Ballinderry	Portmore Church – geograph.org.uk – 346777	early monastic site, founded 6th century by St Lua; St Lua known in Scotland as St Moluag	Laloo; Lann Lua; La Lu
Portmuck 'Abbey'		Cistercian monks apparently a grange of Inch	
Rams Island Monastery		early monastic site, monks founded before 1056? by Gormgal?	Inis-darcairgrenn in Loch-n-Echach; Lann-Abhaid; Inisgatden
Rashee Monastery		early monastic site, founded 5th century by St Patrick	Raith-sithe; Rath-sithe
Rath-easpuic-innic Monastery		early monastic site, founded 5th century by St Patrick	Raith-Epscuip-Fhindich; Capella de Corcrib; Corgrippe; Gortgrib
Rathlin Monastery	Parish Church of St Thomas, Rathlin Island (2) – geograph.org.uk – 818545	attempted foundation c.546 by St Comgal of Bangor thwarted when driven away by armed men; church of Rechrann (identified as Rathlin (Note: Rathlin — identified with Rechrann by J. O'Donovan (identifications from notes in the Annals of the Four Masters, edited by J. O'Donnovan, 1848–51) and W. Reeves, Ecclesiastical Antiquities of Down, Connor and Dromore, 1847)) founded 635 by Segene, Abbot of Iona; burned by Norsemen 795; Reachru (identified as Rathlin (Note: Rathlin — identified with Reachru by J. O'Donovan (identifications from notes in the Annals of the Four Masters, ed. J. O'Donnovan, 1848–51))) plundered 1038; possession of the island gained by Earl of Essex, Lord Deputy, 1558	Reachrain; Raghera; Rachlainn; Rachlin; Rachlin Island; Raghlin
Rathmore Monastery		suggested to be Ratheaspuicinnic, (Note: Rathmore identified as Ratheaspuicinnic — M. Archdall, Monasticon Hibernicum, 1786) an early fortress (Note: Ratheaspuicinnic — W. Reeves, Ecclesiastical Antiquities of Down, Connor and Dromore, 1847, pp.279–81)	
Serade Kaill and Bedamegcan Friary ^{~}		Franciscan Friars, Third Order Regular founded 1445, Archdeacon of Connor appointed to license the building of a monastery by Eugenius IV; dissolved ?	Bademeghcadab; Straid Friary?
Skerry Monastery		founded by St. Patrick; mentioned by Tírechan c.670 as – ad montem Scirte ad locum petrae.. vestigium pedis; N/E of the old church ruins lies a patch of rock with a depression known as St Patrick's footprint; close by the church is Tubernacool holy well; Slemish mountain lies two miles south-east across the river Braid valley.	Schire Padruic; Shirec Archaille; rock of Skirit; Schirich
Templepatrick Preceptory ^{ø}		town said to be named for a Knights Hospitaller foundation — evidence lacking	Villa Hugonis de Logan
Woodburn Abbey		Premonstratensian Canons daughter house of Dryburgh, Scotland; founded before 1326 (1242), by John de Courcy, in succession to Carrickfergus and Druim La Croix (v. supra); dissolved 1 March 1542 [sic] (1542–3), surrendered to the commissioners of Henry VIII; canons transferred to Ballyprior; partly demolished after 1558; site now occupied by Carrickfergus Industrial Centre	The Holy Trinity; St Mary; ____________________; Goodborn Priory

Return to top of page

==== County Armagh ====
(For references and location detail see List of monastic houses in County Armagh)

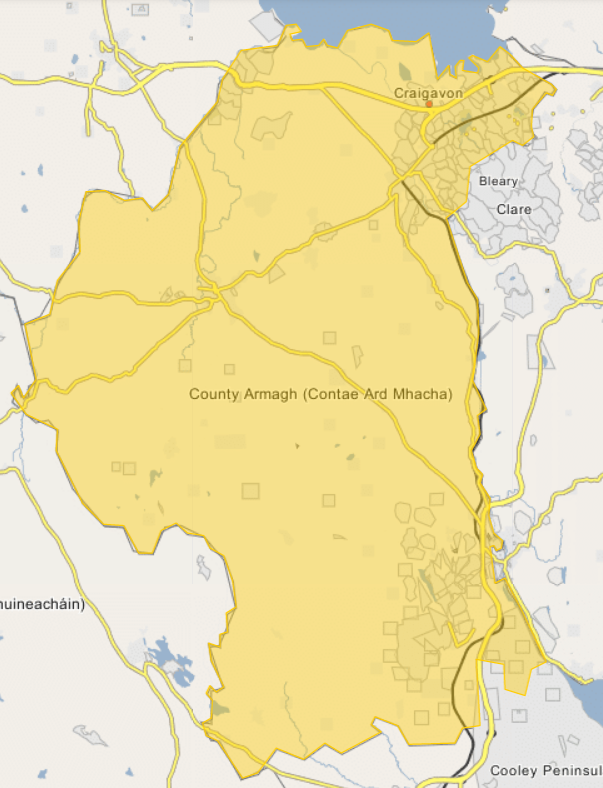
Locations of monastic houses in County Armagh
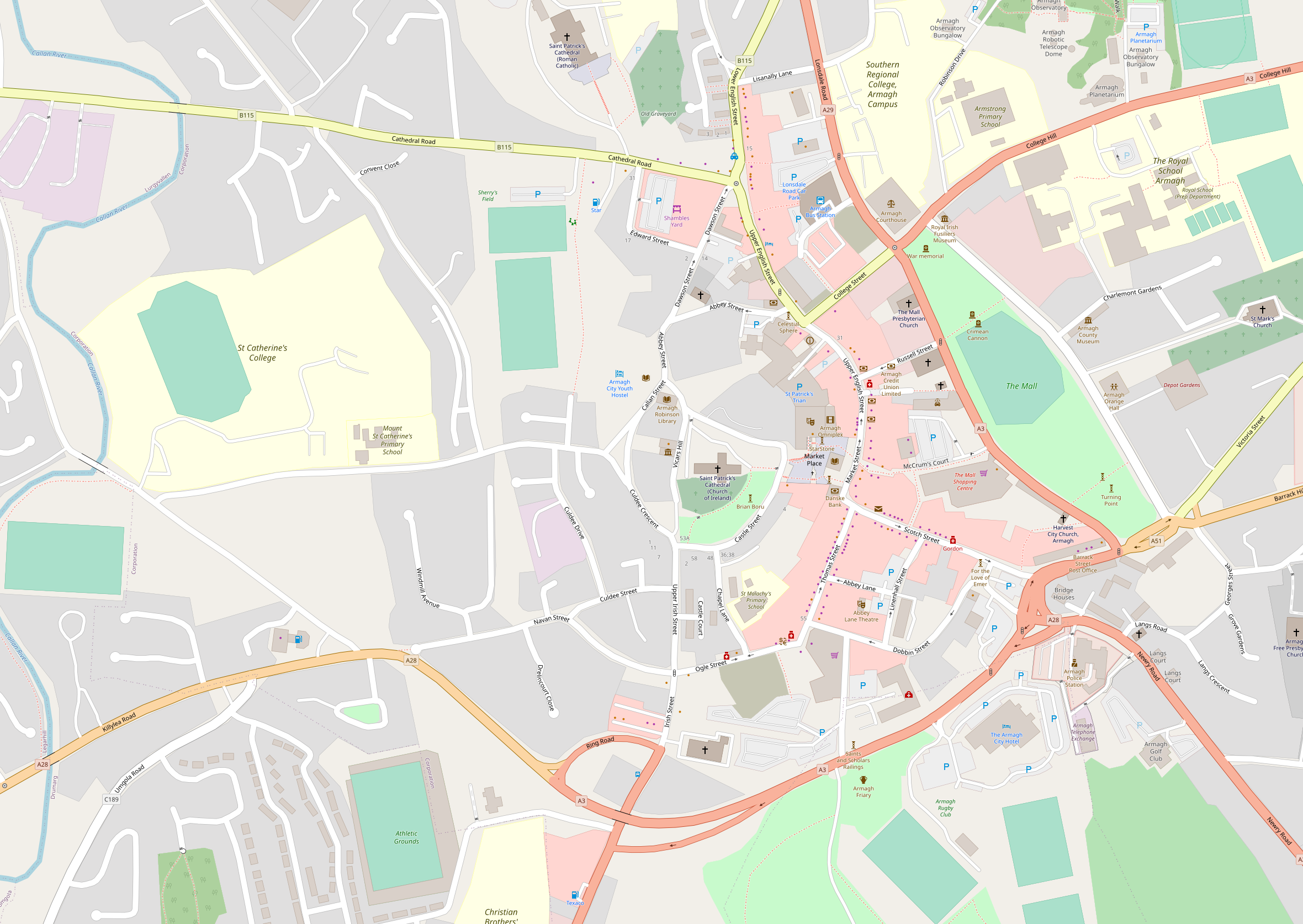
Locations of monastic houses in Armagh

Foundation	Image	Communities & Provenance	Formal Name or Dedication & Alternative Names
Armagh Abbey		Augustinian Canons Regular founded before 1126, consecrated by Archbishop Cellach 1126; refounded 1134; Augustinian Canons Regular — Arroasian adopted c. 1140 at the instigation of St Malachy; dissolved 1562; re-established	SS Peter and Paul
Armagh Blackfriars ^{ø}		suggested community of Dominican Friars purportedly founded c. 1264 by Patrick O'Scanlon; evidence lacking	
Armagh Priory of Culdees		Culdees founded before 779	Ard-macha; Altum Machae; Emain-Macha; Druim Saillech
Armagh Temple-na-Ferta ?Abbey		Gaelic nuns founded 5th century by St Patrick; Augustinian Cannonesses Regular — Arroasian? apparently refounded c. 1144?; dissolved 1562?; granted to Francis Annesley, Esq. by King James 1618	Temple Fortagh
Armagh Temple Brigid ?Priory		Gaelic nuns dependent on Temple-na-Ferta founded 5th century by St Patrick; Augustinian Cannonesses Regular — Arroasian? apparently refounded c. 1144?; dissolved 1562?	Templebreed Priory
Armagh Friary ^{#}		Franciscan Friars founded 1263/4-1551 by Archbishop Patrick O’Scannail; dissolved 1542, though some religious life continued; buildings were used for welfare purposes later in the 16th century; ruinous by 1600	
Armagh Abbey of Columcille		founded before 1010; noted as St Columba’s Church – Rocque’s 1760 map of Armagh	Templecolumkilly in Bore-netrian-sassenach
Ballymoyer Monastery ^{≈}		early monastic site, founded by St Patrick, (Note: Ballymyre identified with Tahellin — J.B. Leslie, Armagh Clergy and Parishes, 1911) possibly Tehallan, County Monaghan (Note: Ballymyre identified with Tehallin — G. T. Stokes and Hennessy)	Baile-mac-maier; Ballymyre; Tech-talain?; Tahellen?
Creggan		Franciscan Friars, First Order — place of refuge	Cregan
Derrynoose Monastery ^{~}		early monastic site, founded 6th century by Mochua of Dairinis; later Culdees of Armagh also suggested to be located in County Cavan (Note: Derrynoose identified with Dairinis, County Cavan — Plummer; Rev. T. Fee, communications, identifies 'in terra Ergallensium' as Derrynoose, County Armagh)	Dairinis; Derinish; Derenoyse; Toaghy
Eglish Monastery		early monastic site; remains of two high crosses on site (Note: Eglish — Rev. T. Fee, communications)	Eglais
Killevy Friary ^{≈¤}	Franciscan Friars, Third Order Regular actually Killeenbrenan, County Mayo — the house at Killevy being a convent of nuns		Kilslere Friary
Killevy Abbey		Gaelic nuns (community founded c. 484 at Faughart; transferred to Beg-erin, County Wexford) transferred from Beg-erin: founded c. 500 (517) by St Moninna (Darerca); Augustinian Cannonesses Regular — Arroasian? refounded after 1171? C.I. parish church built on site	Cell Sleibe Cuilin; Cell-shleibe; Cell-shleibe-mor-Cuillin; Mons-Cuillinn; Kilsleve; Belslebhe; Killeavy
Kill-unche Monastery ^{~}		founded by St Nectan in reg. Conalliae Murthemhne, possibly located in County Armagh	
Kilmore Monastery		early monastic site, founded by St Mochta burned 749; also identified as Kilmore, County Monaghan; Church of Ireland church built on site	Cellmor-einer; Cellmor-muighe-emhir; Cellmor-Ua-Niallain; Cellmor-inir; Cellmor-Aedhan; Kilmore Aedhan; cell-mor; Cella Magna?; Lismor?; Killmor-Aedhan?
Kilnasaggart Monastery ^{#}		site occupied by the Kilnasaggart Stone	Ternocc mac Ciarain dećc; i Cill na Saccart
Mullaghbrack		Armagh Culdees – the Prebendary of Mullaghbrack	Mullach Breac
Seagoe Monastery		early monastic site, founded by St Gobhan, abbot	Suidhe Gobha; Tech-da-Gobha; Tegh-da-Gobha
Straidbail-Loyse Friary ^{≈}		given as friary of Franciscans founded 1282; probable mistaken reference to Stradbally, County Laois	
Tartaraghan		Grange of the Abbey of St. Peter and St. Paul in Armagh	
Tassagh Priory		Culdees, dependent on Armagh and Derrynoose; St Tassach? Culdee cemetery	Ballintassa; Tassaghowtragh
Tech-fethgnai Monastery		early monastic site, possibly a cell near Armagh monastery, founded by Mael-muire, erenagh	
Tynan Abbey ^{#}		Gaelic monks founded before 1072; mansion named Fairview built on site c. 1750; remodelled in the monastic-gothic style, residence of the Stronge family; part in use by the Royal Ulster Constabulary from 1923; bombed by the IRA 21 January 1981; demolished 1998	Tiudhnidha; Tuidnigha

Return to top of page

==== County Down ====
(For references and location detail see List of monastic houses in County Down)

Locations of monastic houses in County Down

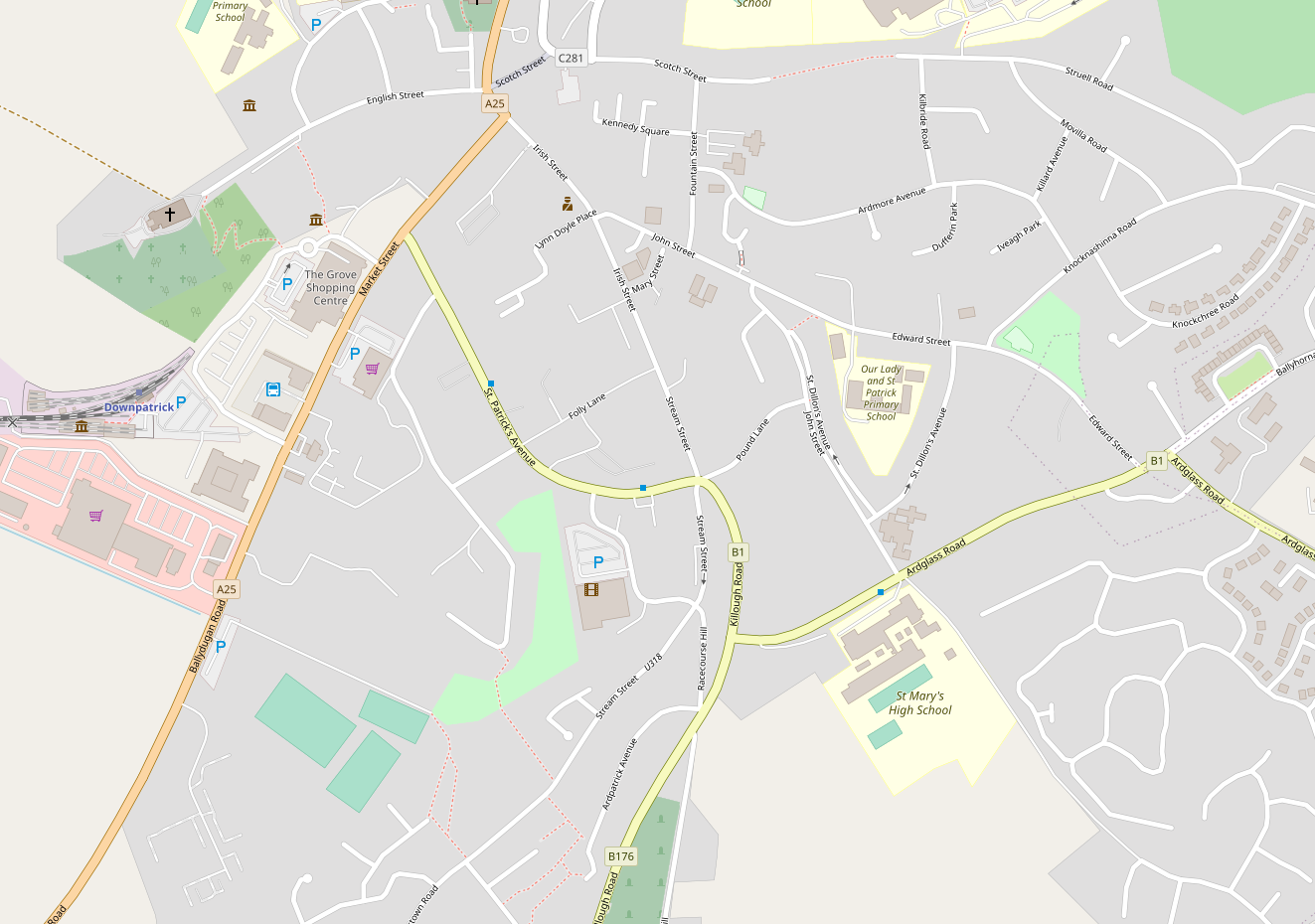
Locations of monastic houses in Downpatrick
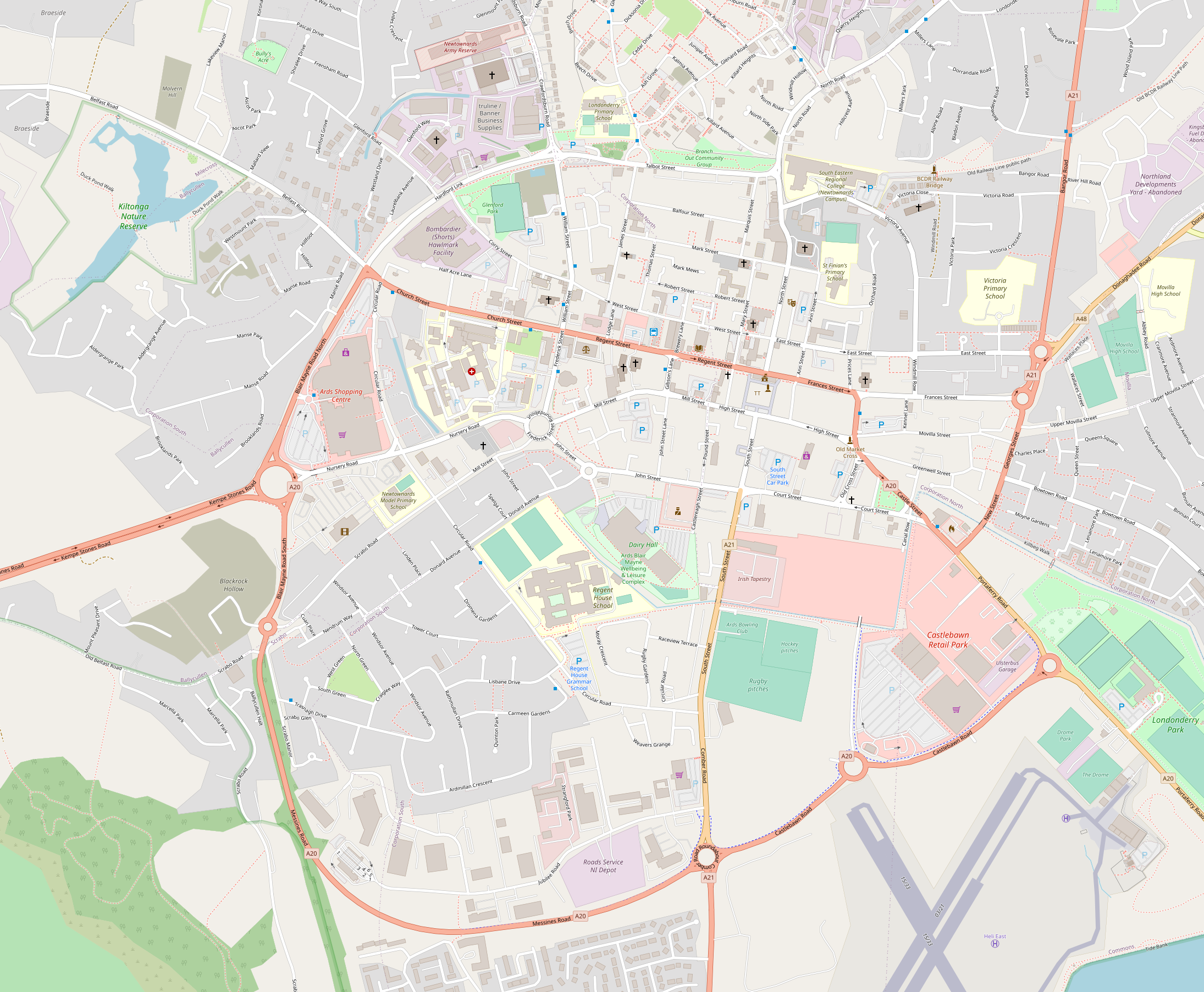
Locations of monastic houses in Newtownards

Foundation	Image	Communities & Provenance	Formal Name or Dedication & Alternative Names
Achad-chail Monastery		early monastic site, founded by 5th century	
Ardicinise Monastery		Franciscan Friars, Third Order Regular founded by Hugh Burgo, local tradition of such a foundation, — evidence lacking; probably Hollywood, v. infra, (Ard-micnascai being the Irish name for Hollywood)	
Ard-mic-nascai Monastery		early monastic site, founded before 640 by St Laiseran; Holywood Priory (v. infra) built on site	Ard-mac-Croisk; Ard-mic-nascai; Ardnicise?
Bangor Abbey		Gaelic monks founded 555 or 559 by St Comgall; Augustinian Canons Regular — from Armagh refounded after 1123-4 by St Malachy; destroyed 1127 during local conflicts c.1140, causing the departure of Malachy and many of his disciples, settling at Ibracense; dissolved 1539; assertion of refounding as a Franciscan house is a misinterpretation; site now incorporated into CI church	Beannchor; Bennchor; Vallis Angelorum; White Choir
Bright Monastery		early monastic site, founded before 540 by St Loarn	Mrechtan; Breatain; Brich; Inreathan
Burren		Dominican Friars — from Newtownards — place of refuge, apparently after the Restoration	An Bhoireann; Boirinn; Ballyburrin
Castleboy Preceptory		Knights Hospitaller founded 1198 by Hugh de Lacy; dissolved c.1414; leased 1584 to George Alexander	St John-in-Ards; St John-in-Ardee; St Johnston; St Johnstowne; Castle-Buy
Cill-mBian Monastery ^{~}		early monastic site, possibly located in County Down, founded before 584 by Fergus, Bishop of Down	Nemhan; Coelestius; Killmain
Clonduff Monastery		early monastic site	Cluain daim
Comber Abbey ^{#}		Cistercian monks — from Whitland founded 25 January 1200 by Brien Catha Dun on the site of earlier monastery (see immediately below); dissolved 1543; granted to James Hamilton, Viscount Clandeboy; assigned to Lord Ardes; site now occupied by St Mary's C.I. church	Comar; Domnach-combair; Comerer; Cumber; Cunbyr
Comber monastery		early monastic site, founded by St Patrick	Comar; Domnach-combair; Comerer; Cumber; Cunbyr
Donaghmore Monastery		early monastic site, founded mid-5th century by St Mac-Erc	Domnach-mor-maige-cobha
Downpatrick Monastery ^{#}		early monastic site, traditionally founded 5th century by St Patrick on the dun or ráth on which the CI cathedral now stands	Dun-da-lethglas; Dun-Celtair; Dun
Downpatrick Friary ^{#}		Franciscan Friars, Third Order Regular founded c.1240 (before 1243) by Hugh de Lacy, Earl of Ulster; burnt 1316; granted to Gerald, Earl of Kildare; Observant Franciscan Friars reformed 1567?; expelled by English protestants 1569; returned 1570; expelled again later; destroyed by the English, church retained as a courthouse; another house built for the convent in the vicinity 1627 (see immediately below)	
Downpatrick Observant Friary ^{#}		Observant Franciscan Friars founded 1627 in the vicinity of the earlier friary (see immediately above); dissolved 1650s	
Downpatrick, St John's Priory		Augustinian Canons Regular founded 1138 by Malachi O'Morgair; Augustinian Canons Regular — Arroasian adopted after 1140; incorporated in Down Cathedral 1513; dissolved before 1541; granted to Gerald, Earl of Kildare	probably St John the Evangelist, though given as St John the Baptist (confusion with Cruciferi priory) ____________________; Monastery of the Irish; Monaster-Grellach
Downpatrick, St Thomas the Martyr's Priory		Augustinian Canons Regular founded before 1183 by John de Courcy, granted by him to the prior and canons of Carlisle; incorporated into Down Cathedral 1513; dissolved before 1541; granted to Gerald, Earl of Kildare 1541	St Thomas the Martyr ____________________; Toberglory
Downpatrick Cruciferi Priory		Fratres Cruciferi founded before 1200 by John de Courcy; incorporated into Down Cathedral 1513; dissolved before 1541; granted to Gerald, Earl of Kildare	St John the Baptist ____________________; The Priory of the English
Downpatrick Priory		Cistercian or Benedictine nuns convent founded before 1200? purportedly by the Bagnal family; ruinous by 1513; incorporated into Down Cathedral 1513	The Nunnery of the Blessed Mary
Dromore Friary		Franciscan Friars founded 1637; dissolved c.1717	
Dromore Monastery ^{+}		early monastic site, founded 6th century? (c.513) by St Mocholmog (Colman); episcopal diocesan cathedral 1192?, extant	Druim-mor-mocholmog
Drumbo Abbey		early monastic site, founded 5th century by St Patrick?; plundered by Connor, son of Artgal M'Lochlin 1130	Druim-bo
Dundrum Preceptory		Knights Templar castle purportedly built 1183 by John de Courcy; in their possession until 1313; granted to the prior of Down	
Dunsy Island Monastery; Killinchy in the lough		early monastic site, founded by St Duinseach	Oileán Dúinsighe; Ilandushagh
Erenagh Abbey		Savignac monks — from Furness founded 1127 by Niall Mac Dunlevi, King of Ulster; Cistercian monks orders merged 1147-8; destroyed by John de Courcy 1177; transferred to Inch 1177	Erynagh; Ernes; Urney; Carig; Carrig; Carricke; Templenageerah
Grey Abbey		Cistercian monks — from Holmcultram founded 25 August 1193 by Africa, wife of John de Courcy; dissolved 1 February 1541; granted to English colonists by Elizabeth I; burnt by Sir Brian O'Neill 1572 to prevent the colonists seeking shelter there; rebuilt and served for a time as a parish church	Jugum Dei; Monaster-Liath; Leigh
Holywood Priory		Franciscan Friars, Third Order Regular built on site of Ard-mic-nascai Monastery (v. supra); Holywood (Ard Mhic Nasca in Irish) was named Sanctus Boscus ("Holy Wood") by the Normans after the woodland surrounding the monastery	Ard-mac-Croisk; Ard-mic-nascai; Ardnicise?; de Sacro Bosco ("Holy Wood")
Inch Abbey		Cistercian monks — from Furness founded 1180 (or 1188) by John de Courcy, on the site of an earlier monastery (see immediately below), replacing the monastery at Carig (Erenagh) which he destroyed; dissolved 1541	Iniscourcey; Inis-courcey; Insula Curcii
Inch Monastery		early monastic site, foundation and founder unknown; plundered by Sitric and Norsemen 1001; plundered 1149	Inis-cumbscraigh; Inis; Egnis;
Kilbroney Monastery		early monastic site, founded by St Brónach	Brónchi uirginis Bronach uirgo o Glinn Sechis; Cill Bronaighe - Bronach's Church; Chill Sechis; Bronach ógh ó
Kilclief Monastery		early monastic site, purportedly founded by St Patrick; plundered and burned 935; annexed to Down see 1034	Cell-clethi; Cell-cleithe; Kyleleth
Killinchy Monastery; Killinchy in the plain		early monastic site, founded by St Duinseach	Cell-insi; Killiny; Kilwyinchi; Cill Dhuinsí; Ecclesia de Kilwyinchi
Killinchy Monastery; Killinchy in the woods		early monastic site, founded by St Duinseach	Cill Dunsí na Coille; Killinchy Nekelly
Kilmbian Monastery ^{~}		early monastic site, possibly located in County Down, founded before 584 by Fergus, Bishop of Down	Cell-biain; Cill-m-Bian; Cill-biein; Kil-m-bian
Kiltonga Monastery		cell, unknown order, foundation or founder; referred to as the chapel of Kilarneid	Killarneid
Maghera Monastery		early monastic site, founded before 567 by St Domangard, Bishop, disciple of St Patrick	Machaire-ratha
Magheralin Monastery		early monastic site; occupied by remains of 15th-century church	Lann-mocholmoc;
Moneyscalp Friary		Dominican Friars — from their place of refuge at Burren, (supra)	Ballymonyskalpie; Muine Scealp
Movilla Abbey		early monastic site, founded before 579 by St Finnian of Moville; burnt by Norsemen 825; revived by St Malachy after 1124; Augustinian Canons Regular refounded after 1135?; Augustinian Canons Regular — Arroasian? adopted after 1140; dissolved 1542; site occupied by 13th-15th-century church	Moville; Magbile; Maghbille; Mable; Mainbile; Moybily
Nendrum Monastery, Mahee Island (Strangford Lough)		Patrician monks founded 5th century by St Patrick; burned 10th century	Oendruim; Aonagh-urmuman; Oinach-urmuman; Nenddrum; Noindrum; Noendoma; Mahee Island
Nendrum Priory		Benedictine monks cell, dependent on St Bees founded 1179 by John de Courcy, who granted land to St Bees (dependent on St Mary's, York), on site of earlier monastery (see immediately above); confirmed to York 1222; disposed of by Henry de Horton 1288; dissolved before 1298; monks probably resided at Templepatrick 13th century; by 1306 a parish church, abandoned 15th century	Oendruim; Aonagh-urmuman; Oinach-urmuman; Nenddrum; Noindrum; Noendoma; Mahee Island
Newry Abbey		possible foundation of Patrician monks possible Benendictine monks founded before 1148? Cistercian monks — from Mellifont founded 1153 by Maurice MacLaughlin, King of Ireland; confirmation of possessions granted 1538 to become a secular collegiate church; surrendered 10 August 1550; granted to Sir Nicholas Bagnall, Marshall of the Army April 1552; chapel on site until c.1744 and abbot's house apparentlyconverted into a private residence; site was cleared end of 18th century for the construction of the modern town; a stone carved with a cross in low relief incorporated into the walls of McCann's bakery, currently on monastic site	St Benedict ____________________; Ibhar-cinntrachta; Iubhair-cinntrachta; Mainister-iubhair; Monaster-de-viride-ligno; Viride Lignum; Nivory; Nyvery
Newry — St Catherine's Priory *		Dominican Friars extant	
Newry Carmelite Monastery		Carmelite nuns	
Newtownards Priory		Dominican Friars founded 1244, purportedly by the Savage family (Note: Louis Augustin Alemand, Monasticum Hibernicum, translated and edited by John Stevens, 1722) or William de Burgo (Note: Tomas de Burgo, Hibernica Dominicana, 1762 edition) — evidence lacking for either; (Note: A. Coleman, O.P., The Ancient Dominican Foundations of Ireland, 1902) dissolved February 1541, surrendered by the prior, Patrick O'Doran; granted to Sir Thomas Smith by Elizabeth I; burned by O'Neill of Clandeboye 1572 to prevent use as a fort by the English; reroofed by Lord Montgomery for use by Protestants	St Colmcille ____________________; Baile-nua-na-airde; Baile-nudh-airde; Villanova; Newton
Portaferry Monastery ^{#} Derry Churches		site thought to be now occupied by two small churches; patron St. Cummain, Virgin, of Dál mBuinne, and of Derry, Parish of Ballyphillip	
Raholp Monastery	St Tassach's church, Raholp (2) - geograph.org.uk - 542235	early monastic site, founded purportedly by St Patrick	Raith-colpthai; Cell-colptha; Kilcholpa
Rathmullan Camera?		Knights Hospitaller possible camera or frankhouse, hospital or hospice, limb of Castleboys	Rath-mullin; Rath-molyn; Ecclesia de Rathmolyn
Saul Monastery	Graveyard at St Patrick's Memorial church, Saul - geograph.org.uk - 269928	According to tradition in 432 the local chieftain Dichu gave St Patrick land. On this land was built a barn: thus Saul became the site of St Patrick's first church.	Sabhull Padraig; Sepulturam Patricii; Baile itá Saball; an Sabhall
St Andrews in Ards Priory		Benedictine monks alien house: dependent on Stogursey, Somerset and Lonlay Abbey, France; founded after 1183 by John de Courcy; became denizen:independent from 1356; dissolved c.1543?; granted by James I, to the Protestant Bishop of Armagh	Black Abbey; Blackabbey; Mainister Dubh
St Donard Oratory		early monastic cell/oratory, founded c.506, by Domangart, son of Echaid	Sliab-domhanghairt; Sliab-domhanghairt-slange; Salanga
Stokes Priory	duplication of St Andrews in Ards, (Note: Stokes Priory — listed by Louis Augustin Alemand, Monasticum Hibernicum, translated and edited by John Stevens, 1722) supra		
Tamlacht-meenan Monastery		early monastic site, founded before 627	Tamlachta Umhail
Tullyhoa Abbey ^{ø}		order, foundation and founder unknown; ruins purported to be the remains of an abbey	
Tullylish Monastery ^{#}	Tullylish old church - geograph.org.uk - 344807	early monastic site, founded by St Bearnasga of Tulach-lis; mistakenly identified as Tyllylease (County Cork); remains excavated in the vicinity of the ruined parochial church (abandoned 1861, replaced by new church built to the west)	Telach-liss

Return to top of page

==== County Fermanagh ====
(For references and location detail see List of monastic houses in County Fermanagh)

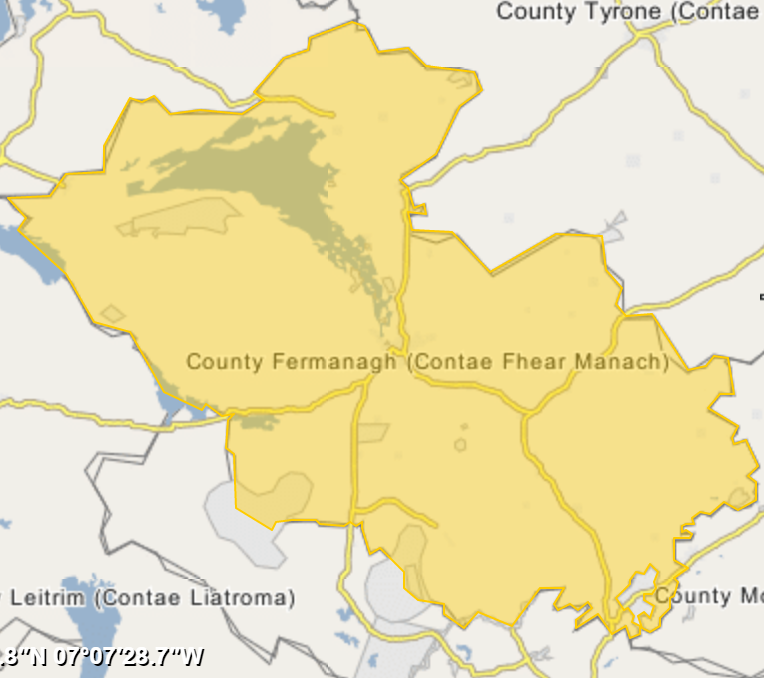
Locations of monastic houses in County Fermanagh

Foundation	Image	Communities & Provenance	Formal Name or Dedication & Alternative Names
Aghalurcher Monastery		early monastic site, founded 8th century by St Ronan, son of Aedh Dubh	Achad-urchaire; Achad-lurchaire
Aghavea Monastery		early monastic site, founded 6th century (about the time of St Molaise of Devenish) by Lasair of Achad-beithe	Achad-beithe
Aredmuilt Monastery		early monastic site, probably Derryvullan	Ariodmuilt
Boho Monastery		early monastic site	Botha; St Faber; Feadhbar
Davy's Island Monastery		Augustinian Canons Regular cell of Lisgoole; ruined wall purported to be remains of the cell	Inishmore
Derrybrusk Monastery			Daire-broscaidh; Aireach-brosca; Daerybrosca; Seanadh; Belle Isle
Devenish Island Abbey, Lough Erne		Augustinian Canons Regular — probably from SS Peter & Paul, Armagh founded 1130, adjacent to Culdees house (see immediately below); Augustinian Canons Regular — Arroasian dependent on Armagh after 1140; burned 1157 and 1360; apparently dependent on Clogher 1427; dissolved after 1600; deserted 1607; possibly Augustinian Friars (if Dominensis)	The Abbey Church of Saint Mary, Devenish Island St Laserian's parish and collegiate church (1457) ____________________; Devenish Island Priory; Daiminis; Daminis; Inis-na-nDam; Dominensis?
Devenish Monastery		early monastic site, founded before 564 or 571 by St Molaise (Laisre); Culdees from 10th century	
Gola Priory		Dominican Friars founded after 1660 by Fr John MacManus, obtaining land from Lord Enniskillen	The Priory of the Nativity of the Blessed Virgin Mary ____________________; Gaula
Iniseo Monastery		early monastic site, founded before 777 by St Constans	Ins-eo; Inisionois in Lough Erne; Eonois
Inishmacsaint Monastery, Lough Erne		founded 6th century by Saint Ninnidh Láimhdhearg	Inis-maige-samh, Island of the Sorrel Plain
Inisrocha Monastery, Lough Erne		early monastic site, listed as an abbey	
Kilcoo Monastery		early monastic site, founded by St Patrick?; remains of high cross	St Patrick?
Kiltierney Monastery		early monastic site?; Cistercian monks grange	Cell-tighernaigh; Kilternan
Kinawley Monastery		early monastic site, founded before 563	Cell-naale; Kilnaile
Lisgoole Abbey ^{#}		founded 1106? built on site of early monastery (see immediately below); Augustinian Canons Regular founded c.1145 by Mc'Noellus Mackenlef, King of Ulaid; Augustinian Canons Regular — Arroasian? possibly adopted between 1140 and 1148 at the behest of St Malachy; became ruinous, dissolved 1583 (c.1580); Observant Franciscan Friars reformed 1580-3; dissolved 1598, friars expelled; refounded at another location 1616 to before 1811	The Abbey Church of Saint Peter, Saint Paul and Saint Mary, Lisgoole
Lisgoole Monastery ^{#}		early monastic site; site later occupied by Augustinian priory (see immediately above)	The monastery of Saint Aid, Lisgoole; ____________________; Lissgabail; Leasa-gobail; Lisgobhail; Lis-gamhail; Lis-gevail; Lis-govel
Magheracross Monastery		apparent early monastic site, Culdee	Machaire-na-croise
Pubble Monastery		early monastic site	Popull; Pobul; Chappell of Popull; Collidea
Rossory Monastery		early monastic site, nuns founded before 480 by St Fanchea; church of St Fuinche founded 1084; hospital or hospice founded c.1371?	Ros-airthir; Ros-oirthir
Tivealough Monastery ^{ø} Keenaghan		possibly an early Christian monastic site, fd. before the 12th century; purportedly Franciscan Friars evidence lacking; medieval ruins described as 'abbey or church'	Tievaelough; Tivea Lough; Magheramanagh; Keenaghan Abbey
White Island Monastery?		attempts made to identify this location as being Eo-inis monastery	

Return to top of page

==== County Londonderry ====
(For references and location detail see List of monastic houses in County Londonderry)

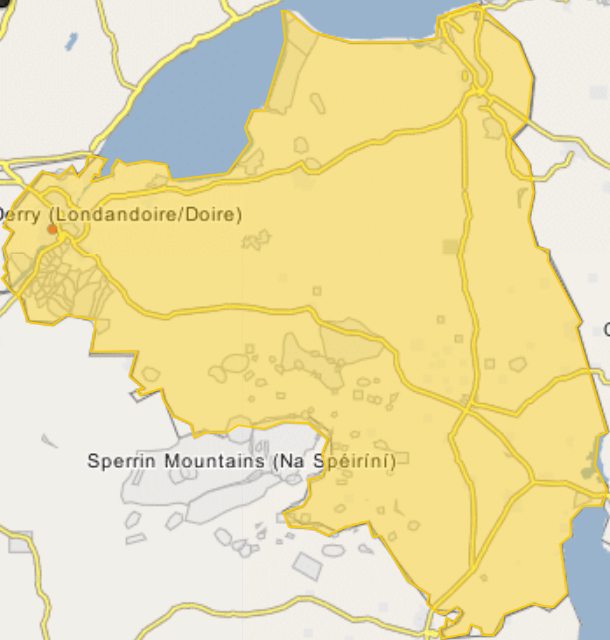
Locations of monastic houses in County Londonderry
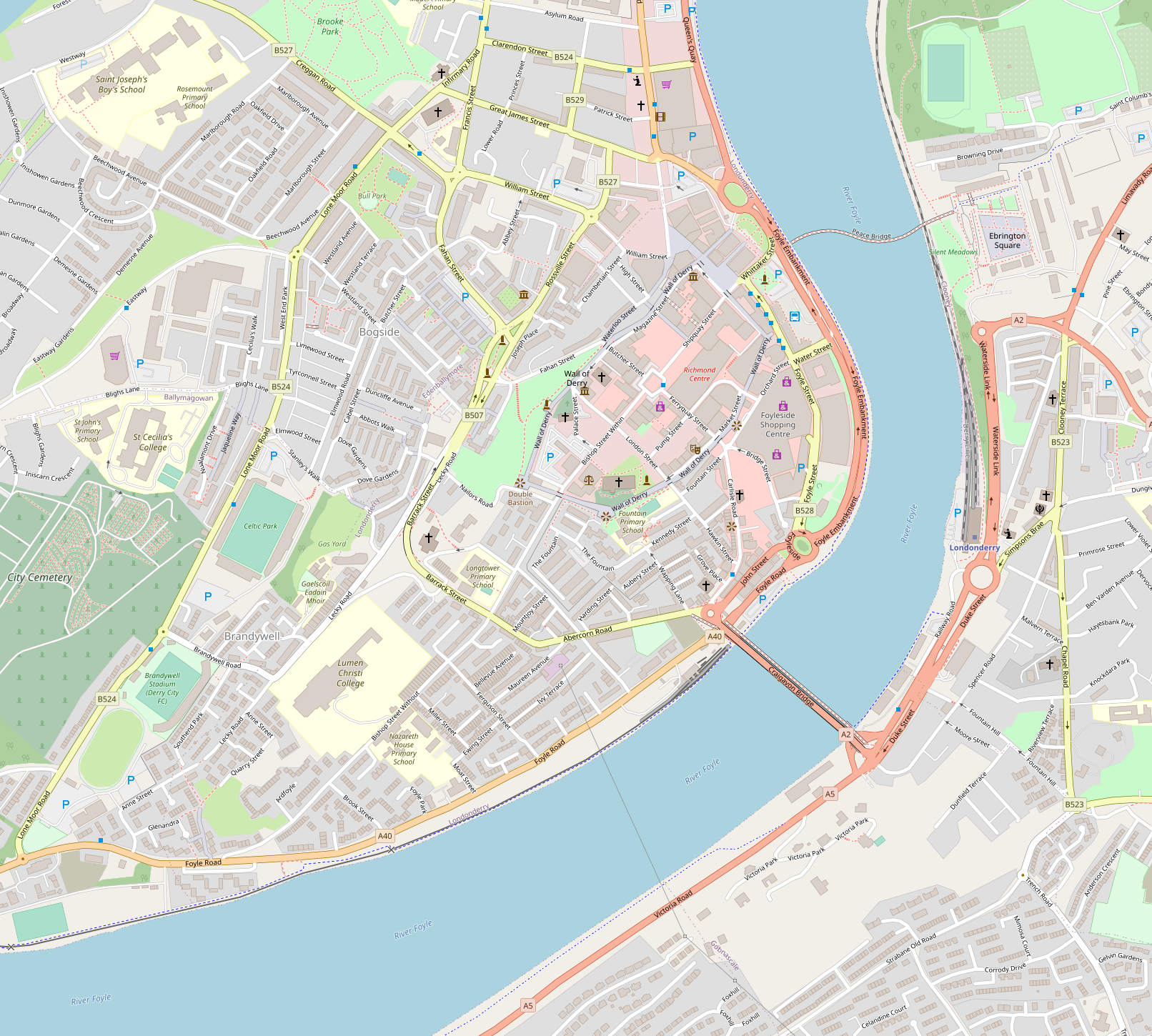
Locations of monastic houses in County Londonderry
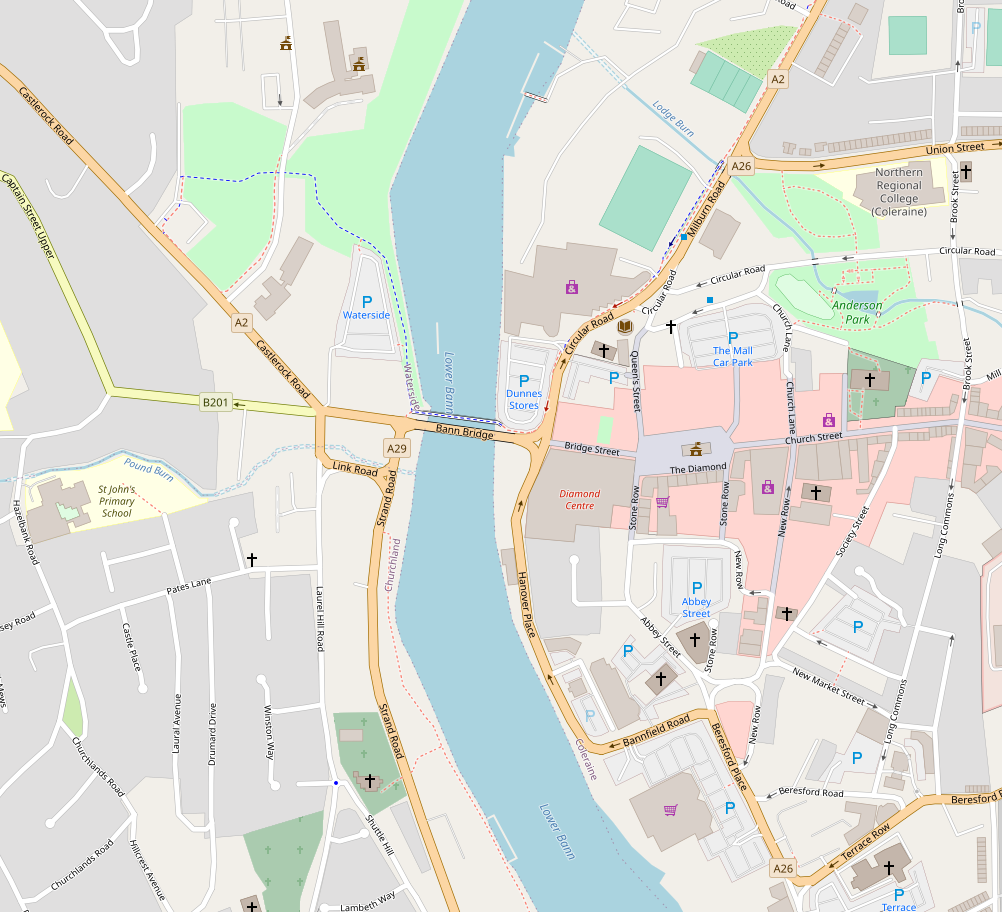
Locations of monastic houses in Coleraine

Foundation	Image	Communities & Provenance	Formal Name or Dedication & Alternative Names
Aghadowey Monastery ^{#}		early monastic site; hospital of St Gowry 1603	Achad-dubthaigh; Achedoffey
Aghanloo Monastery		early monastic site; under erenaghs until 16th century	Ath-luga; Ath-longe; Allowa
Agivey Monastery		early monastic site; purportedly founded 7th century by St Guar of Aghadowey; Cistercian monks grange of Macosquin	Augheve; Athgeybi
Ballymagrorty Monastery (Derry Diocese)		early monastic site, founded 6th century by St Colmcille	Baile-meg-robhartaig; Baile-megrabhartaigh
Ballynascreen Monastery		early monastic site, founded 6th century by St Colmcille	Scrin-coluim-cille
Banagher Monastery	Banagher Old Church - geograph.org.uk - 595232	early monastic site, traditionally founded 11th century? by St Muriedbach O'Heney; under erenaghs until early 17th century	Bennchor; Bangoria
Bovevagh Monastery	Site of Bovevagh old church - geograph.org.uk - 716443	early monastic site, purportedly founded 575 by St Colmcille; oratory burned 1100; under erenaghs until 17th century	Both-mheidhbhe; Both-medhbha
Camus Monastery		early monastic site, founded before c.580; under erenaghs until 16th/17th century	Camas; Cambos; Camsa
Church Island Monastery, Lough Beg		early monastic site; plundered by Ulidians 1129; under erenaghs until early 17th century	St Mochonna (possibly St Mochonna of Killyman) ____________________; Inistaiti; InisTeda; Ballyscullion; Inish Taoide
Coleraine Monastery; St Patrick's		early monastic site, founded 5th century by St Patrick; burned 731; suffered destruction 1171 and 1177;	Cuil Raithin; Cul-rathain; Colran; Bannin;
Coleraine Monastery; St Carbreus		early monastic site, founded 6th century by St Carbreus; dismantled in 1213, Drumtarsey castle erected on site	Cuil Raithin; Abbey of the Bann
Coleraine Friary		Dominican Friars founded 1244; Dominican Friars, Regular Observant reformed 1484; dissolved 1543	St Mary
Coleraine; Killowen		founded 1248	Drumtarsy; Cill Eoghain - Owen's church; Cill-Eogain - St John's Church
Cumber Monastery		early monastic site, traditionally founded 5th century by St Patrick; under secular erenaghs until early 17th century	Combior; Camer; Commyr
Derry Monastery ^{~}		early monastic site, traditionally founded c.546 by St Colmcille, but probably c.590 by Fiachra mac Ciárain mac Ainmerech mac Sétna; St Augustine's C.I. Church or St Columb's Church are cited as alternative possible locations of the monastery	Daire-calgach; Doire-Choluim-Chille; Daire Duib-recles; Cella Nigra
Derry Abbey		Augustinian Canons Regular — Arroasian — affiliated to SS Peter & Paul, Armagh; founded c.1233?; reportedly in very poor state of repair by 1411, due to warfare and adversity; churches desecrated and community expelled 1566; under occupation by English troops under Colonel Edward Randolph; restored? canons possibly briefly returned; dissolved 1576?; reoccupied by the English; Augustinian Friars refounded c.1643	Cella Nigra
Derry Priory		Cistercian nuns founded 1218; dissolved 1512	
Derry Franciscan Priory	purported foundation of Franciscan Friars; (in 1609 the commissioners erroneously took the ruins of the Blackfriars house (see immediately below) to be Franciscan)		
Derry — St Dominic's Priory		spurious accounts of earlier Dominican foundation; Dominican Friars founded 1274; dissolved 1576; briefly restored?	St Dominic
Desertmartin Monastery		early monastic site, apparently founded by a member of the O'Lynn family (suggested by the name Mainister O'Fhloinn); erenaghs until 16th century	Mainister O'Fhloinn; Moneysterlin
Desertoghill Monastery		early monastic site, purportedly founded by St Colmcille; erenaghs until 16th century	Disert-ui-tuathghaill; Desert-O'Tuohill
Donnybrewer Monastery		early monastic site	Domnach-dala; Domnach-dola
Drumachose Abbey		early monastic site, patronised 6th century by St Cainnech	Druimcoos; Dirumcoos; Dronagh; Drungrosa; Roa
Dunboe Monastery		early monastic site, founded by St Adamnan; erenaghs until 16th century	Dun-bo; ~co Dun-mbó i n-Dal riatai; Duna-uó, a tempull; Durrbo, par. ecclesie de
Duncrun Monastery		early monastic site, founded by St Patrick	Dun-cruithne
Dungiven Monastery		early monastic site, founded 7th century, by St Naechtain?	Dun-geimin; Dun-giobhin; Dun-gevin
Dungiven Priory		Augustinian Canons Regular — Arroasian? founded after 1140? (after 1138?), purportedly by the O'Cahan family; dissolved before 1603; round tower incorporated into church, but collapsed c.1784	St Mary
Errigal Monastery		early monastic site, purportedly founded 6th century by St Colmcille; destroyed by Norsemen 9th century; erenaghs until 16th/17th century	Airecal-Adamnan; Arragel; Temple Erigall; Airecuil, Cainnech
Faughanvale Monastery		early monastic site, erenaghs until 16th century	St Canice (St Conici) ____________________; Nuachongbail; Fochwayll; Killeitra; Tircaerthian
Kilcronaghan Monastery	Old Kilcronaghan Church, Mormeal - geograph.org.uk - 355618	early monastic site, patronised by St Cruithnechan; erenaghs until early 17th century	Cell-cruithneachain
Killelagh Monastery	erroneously given as County Derry in Gwynn & Hadcock index — actually County Donegal		
Kilrea Monastery		early monastic site; erenagh land until 1609	Cell-reagh
Lan More Friary ^{~}		Franciscan Friars, Third Order Regular foundation unknown; dissolution unknown; possibly County Londonderry or County Antrim	Landmore?
Lissan Monastery		early monastic site, founded before 744	Lessan; ~Lessain episcopi; ~Lesan i Sliabh Callann,ó; ~o Lesan i Sliabh Callan
Macosquin Abbey ^{+}		Cistercian monks — from Morimond, France founded 1218; dissolved before 1600; granted to the London Companies (Merchant Taylors) authorities for the plantation of Derry; house named 'Glebe House' built on site of claustral buildings c.1770; scant remains of monastic church incorporated into St Mary's C.I. parish church, built on site	Clarus Fons; Magoscain; Moycoscain
Maghera Monastery ^{+}		early monastic site, founded 6th century by St Lurach; plundeded by the Norsemen 832; church burnt 1135; diocesan cathedral see transferred from Ardstraw c.1152; see transferred to Derry 1254	Machaire-ratha-luraig; Rath-Luraig; Rath-lure
Magilligan Monastery		early monastic site, erenagh land until early 17th century	Aird-megiollagain; Ardia; Scrin-i-nArdia; Ballynascreen-ardia; Tamlachta-ard; Tamlaght-ard; The Shrine of St Columb
Tamlaght Finlagan Monastery		early monastic site, founded 585 by St Fionn-logha; erenaghs until early 17th century; site occupied by remains of a church destroyed 1641	Tamlacht-fionloga; Templefinlagan; Ballykelly
Tamlaght O'Crilly Monastery		early monastic site; erenaghs until early 17th century	Ta, lachta-mac-ninaich
Termoneeny Monastery		early monastic site; erenaghs until early 17th century	~in Enga; Termon-any; Eanegea

Return to top of page

==== County Tyrone ====
(For references and location detail see List of monastic houses in County Tyrone)

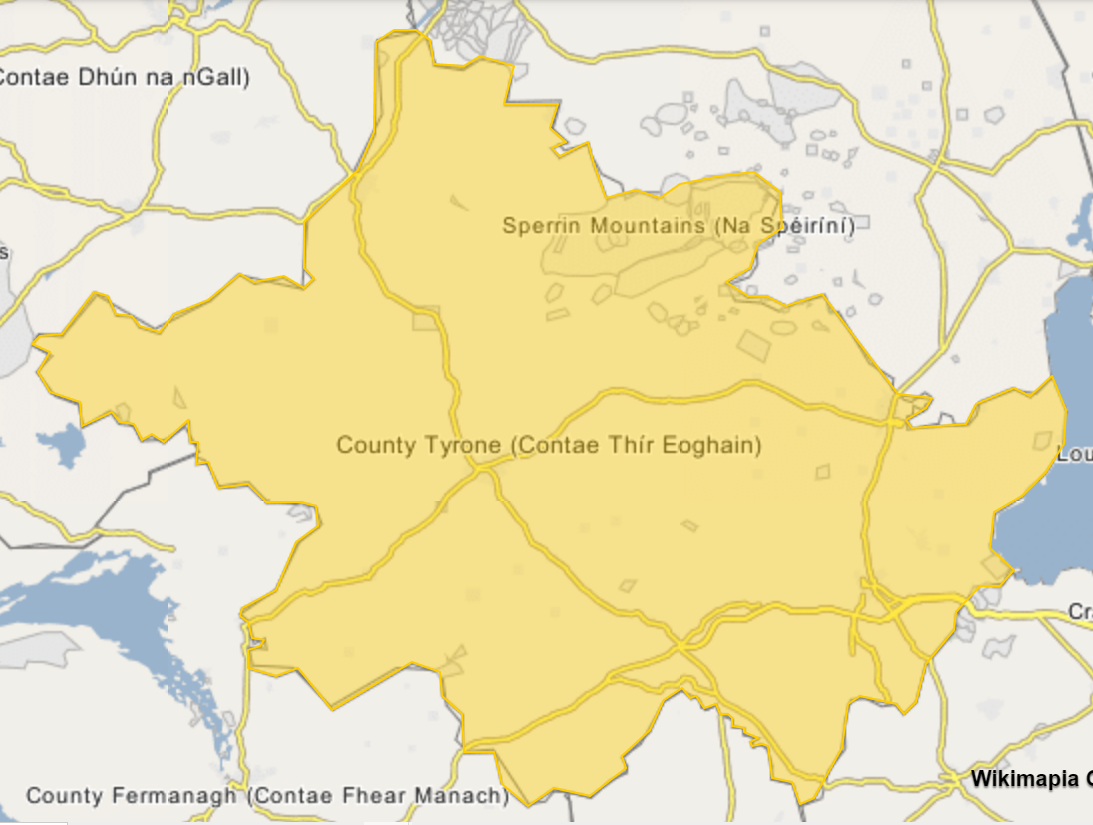
Locations of monastic houses in County Tyrone

Foundation	Image	Communities & Provenance	Formal Name or Dedication & Alternative Names
Ardboe Monastery	Ardboe Abbey - geograph.org.uk - 190469	early monastic site, founded late 6th century; burned 1166; destroyed by John de Courcey in 1198	Ard-bo; Arboe
Ardstraw Monastery		early monastic site, founded by St Eugene; diocesan cathedral c.581; see transferred to Maghera c.1152; erenaghs until early 17th century	Ard-stratha; Ard-strath; Cenel-Eoghain; Kinel-eoguin
Ardtrea Monastery		early monastic site, nuns founded 5th century by St Trea	Artrea; Ard-trega
Ballinesaggart Friary		Franciscan Friars, Third Order Regular?	
Ballynasaggart Friary		Franciscan Friars, Third Order Regular founded c.1489 by Con O'Neal; dissolved before 1607?	Baile-na-sagart; Baile-i-dhalaigh; Balenesegert
Priory of Our Lady of Benburb *		Servite Friars founded 1949 at a mansion in the demesne of Benburb Castle	
Bodoney Monastery ^{#}		early monastic site, founded 5th century by St Patrick; St Patrick's C.I. parish church possibly built on site	Badoney; Both-domnaich
Brantry		Franciscan Friars Minor, Conventual — place of refuge from Armagh	
Cappagh Monastery	Dunmullan Old Graveyard. Cappagh. County Tyrone	early monastic site, patron St Eoghan; erenaghs until 16th century	Ceapach; Kappagh; Cappaghquoart
Carrickmore Monastery		early monastic site, founded by St Columba	Temple termonmaguirk?; Termon Cumainig
Clogher Abbey — St Mary		Augustinian Canons Regular — Arroasian transferred from cathedral (see immediately below) before 1183; dissolved before 1600?	St Mary
Clogher Abbey — St Macarten's Cathedral		early monastic site, founded 5th century by St Patrick; episcopal diocesan cathedral 1111; Augustinian Canons Regular founded after 1135; Augustinian Canons Regular — Arroasian adopted after 1140; see transferred to Louth c.1138; transferred to new site (see immediately above) before 1183; see returned 1192; CI episcopal diocesan cathedral from 8 August 1542	St Macarten ____________________; Clochar
Clonfeacle Monastery		early monastic site, founded before 597; Culdees united to Armagh c.950; site possibly occupied by St Jarlath's RC Church	Cluain-fiachne; Cluain-fiacul
Corickmore Abbey		Franciscan Friars, Third Order Regular founded before 1500; dissolved c.1603; granted to Sir Henry Piers; assignee Sir Daniel Lee	Caorock; Comrac; Corrock
Donaghanie Monastery		early monastic site, founded by St Patrick	Domnach an Eich; Donnagh an egh
Donaghedy Monastery	Donaghedy Church, Donemana - geograph.org.uk - 206601	early monastic site, patron St Caidinus (Bishop Caoiti); erenaghs until early 17th century	Domnach-caoide
Donaghenry Monastery		early monastic site, founded by St Patrick	inDomnuch Camri; Dompnaghfynner; Domhnach Fainre; Donaghendry
Donaghmore Monastery		early monastic site, founded 5th century by St Patrick; dissolved after 1172; burned 1195; shrines owned by Culdees 1291; in use as parochial church 1306; rectory owned by Culdees until 16th century; church remains visible to 19th century; damaged high cross re-erected 18th century; (NIEA)	Domnach-mor-maige-imclair
Donaghrisk Priory	Donaghrisk old graveyard - County Tyrone	order unknown founded 1294 by a member of the O'Hagan family	Domnach-riascad; Donarisk
Dromore Abbey		Cistercian monks purportedly founded on the site of early nunnery (see immediately below); burnt 1690;	
Dromore Monastery		early monastic site, nuns, founded by St Patrick; purportedly on the site of later Cistercian abbey (see immediately above)	Druim-Dubhain Cluain-Dubhain
Drumragh Monastery	Drumragh Graveyard - geograph.org.uk - 95904	early monastic site, patron St Colmcille; erenagh land until 16th/17th century	Druim-raithe; Dromeraa; Little Abbey
Dungannon Friary		Franciscan Friars, Third Order Regular founded c.1489 by Con O'Neal (Con McHenry McOwen); dissolved 1607; granted to Richard Nugent, Baron of Delvin 1611	Ballysaggart; Ballinesaggirt; Baile Sagairt
Dungannon Friary		Franciscan Friars, First Order founded after the Restoration 1687; dissolved 1817	
Dunmisk Monastery		early monastic site, founded by St Patrick; patron Presbyter Meascáin	Domnach Meascáin; Domnach Mescan; Dún Meascáin
Errigal Keerogue Monastery		early monastic site, patron St Ciaran, founded before 506 by St Macartin; Franciscan St Kieran's church built on site	Airecal-da-chiaroc; Errigal Keeroge
Glenarb Monastery		early monastic site	Cluain-oirb; Clonarb
Kilskeery Monastery		early monastic site, founded 749; erenagh into 16th century	Cell-scire; Kilskirry
Leckpatrick Monastery	Old Leckpatrick Graveyard, Ballymagorry, May 2010 (02)	early monastic site; erenagh land until after 1600	Cell-patrick; Magherynelec
Longfield Monastery		early monastic site; erenagh at least until 1609	Lemchaill; Leamcoil; Lauchyll; Langfield
Magheraglass Priory		early monastic site, probably founded 6th century by St Columcille; Augustinian Canons Regular — Arroasian dependent on Armagh; founded 1242 by Terence O'Hagan; possibly dissolved by c.1400; converted into a fortress by the O'Hagans during the Elizabethan wars	Magh-erir-di-ghlais; Maghcolum-cille; Maghlemchailli?
Omagh Friary		Franciscan Friars, Third Order Regular founded 1464; dissolved c.1603; granted to Sir Henry Piers, assigned to Sir Daniel Lee; an ivy-clad wall along the riverbank by Abbey Bridge is purportedly part of a monastic foundation	An-Omach; fOmach; Ogmag; Oghmagh
Omagh Monastery		early monastic site, apparently founded by 792 (though may refer to Drumragh, supra)	An-Omach; fOmach; Ogmag; Oghmagh
Pubble Friary		Franciscan Friars, Third Order Regular founded before 1500; dissolved c.1603; granted to Sir Henry Piers, assigned to Sir Daniel Lee	Popu; Pobul; Puble
Scarvagherin Friary		Franciscan Friars, Third Order Regular founded c.1456; dissolved c.1603; granted to Sir Henry Piers	Scairb-an-ciothrainn; Garvaghkeirinn; Gervaghkerin
Strabane Friary		purported Franciscan Friars, Third Order Regular founded 14th century; (Note: Strabane — Thomas de Burgo, Hibernica Dominicana (ed. 1762) 747) (though Franciscans did not arrive until late 17th century); merged with Scarvaherin, supra	
Termonamongan Monastery	St Caireall's Graveyard - geograph.org.uk - 698760	early monastic site, founded 6th century, patron St Caireall, erenaghs at least to c.1411	Termon-ui-mhaoin; Magherakeel; Kylchyrryll; Cill Chairill; St Caireall's church
Termonmaguirk Monastery		early monastic site, purportedly founded by St Colmcille; land owned by the Maguirk family 16th century	Termon-cumaing; Termon-Comyn
Trillick Monastery		early monastic site, purportedly founded by 613	Trelec-mor; Trelick

Return to top of page

=== Republic of Ireland ===
==== County Carlow ====
(For references and location detail see List of monastic houses in County Carlow)

This is a list of the monastic houses in County Carlow, Ireland.

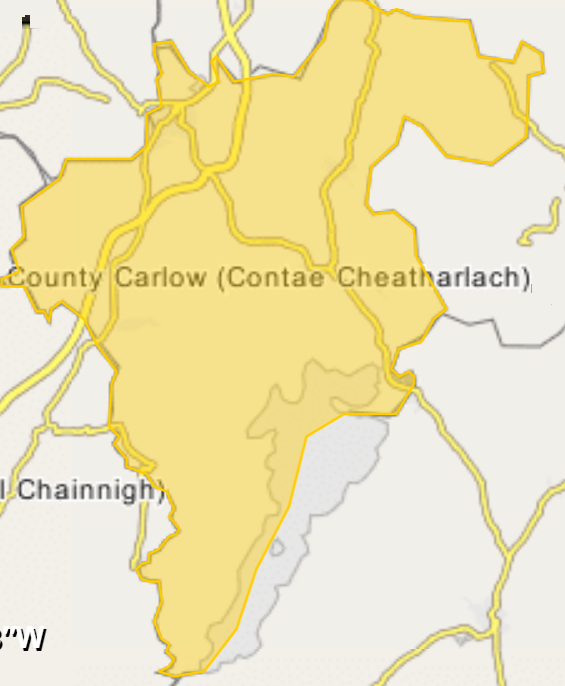
Locations of monastic houses in County Carlow

Foundation	Image	Communities & Provenance	Formal Name or Dedication & Alternative Names
Acaun Monastery ^{#}, Rathvilly Parish		supposed monastic site — order and period unknown	
Agha Monastery		Gaelic monks founded 6th century by St Fintan; possibly not surviving after 10th century	Achad-finglass; Achadfinglass; Achad-Urghlais; Augha
Aghade Priory		Augustinian — Arroasian nuns dependent on Dublin; cell of St Mary de Hogges, Dublin; founded 1151 by Dermot mac Murchard, King of Leinster; dissolved before 1500?	Athaddy; Athade; Athad; Aghadh; Aghade Nunnery; Ath-fhadhat
Athkiltan ^{~}		Knights Templar manor, possibly located in County Carlow	Takyltan
Ballymoon Preceptory ^{ø}		supposed (though dubious) establishment of Knights Templar purportedly founded c.1300 no record of preceptory found	Bally MacWilliam-roe; Bally-M'William-Row; Baile-mic-Uilliam
Carlow Monastery		Gaelic monks founded before 601-2 by St Comgal of Bangor, site granted by Cormac, King of Ui Bairrche	Cathair-lach; Ceithiorlach
Poor Clare Monastery Carlow, Graiguecullen			Monastery of Perpetual Adoration ____________________; Poor Clares founded 19th century
Clonmore Monastery		Gaelic monks founded 6th century by St Mogue; possibly not surviving after 10th century; church burnt 1040	Cluain-mor-maedoc; Clonemore
Domnach-feic Monastery		early monastic site, founded 5th century (in the time of St Patrick) by St Fiace	Domnach-feich
Dunleckney Preceptory ^{#}		purported Knights Templar founded 1300; dissolved 1308 (Note: Dunleckney — Knights Templar preceptory existence: Lewis, Topological Dictionary of Ireland (1837), i, p.584)	Leighlinbridge Preceptory?
Kilfortchearn Monastery		early monastic site, purportedly founded 5th century (in the time of St Patrick) by St Fortchern, bishop	Cell-foirtcheirn; Ui Drona
Killerig Preceptory		Knights Templar founded before 1212 (in the reign of King John) by Gilbert de Borard; Knights Hospitaller dissolved 1540; granted to the wife of Gerard Aylmer 1590; leased to James Sherlock of Waterford	The Preceptory of St John the Baptist ____________________; Killargy; Killarge; Friarstown
Leighlin Abbey ^{+}		Gaelic monks founded c.600 by St Gobban; episcopal diocesan cathedral; destroyed by fire c.1060; new cathedral built 12th-13th century; extant; secular canons purportedly instituted at the cathedral by Bishop John Mulgan (Seaán Ó Maolagáin) c.1422; dissolved 1567	Old Leighlin Abbey; Leth-glenn
Leighlin Friary ^{≈}	Franciscan Friars, Third Order Regular — erroneous reference to the friary of Bakil, Wicklow (Note: 'Leighlin Friary' — listed by Louis Augustin Alemand, Monasticum Hibernicum, translated and edited by John Stevens, 1722, p.252)		
Leighlin Priory		Augustinian Canons Regular — Arroasian founded after 1163? at the instance of St Lawrence O'Toole (dubious reference to 9th century foundation by Burchard, son of Gurmund, a Norwegian); dissolved c.1392; petition for suppression and appropriation to the cathedral chapter granted by the Pope to the Bishop (Thomas Fleming) 1432	St Stephen
Leighlinbridge Priory		Carmelite monks founded 1265-72 (before the death of Henry III) by a member of the Carew family; dissolved before 1541; converted into a fort; restored, convent in existence c.1737	Priory of St Mary
Leighlinbridge Preceptory ^{≈}		Knights Templar apparently same as Dunleckney Preceptory (supra)	
Lorum Monastery		Gaelic monks patron St Laseroam (Molaise)	Leamhdruim
St Mullin's Monastery		Gaelic monks founded 7th century; (NM)	Achad Cainida; Tech-moling; Thamoling; Temolyn; Shymylyng; Thacineling; Thacmoling
St Mullin's Abbey		early monastic site, founded 632 by St Molling, site purportedly granted by St Aidan, Bishop of Ferns; purported Augustinian Canons Regular (no documentation of foundation); plundered and burnt before 1138; (NM)	Achad Cainida; Tech-moling; Thamoling; Temolyn; Shymylyng; Thacineling; Thacmoling
St Mullins Friary		Franciscan Friars, license granted 1414 — no evidence foundation ever implemented	Achad Cainida; Tech-moling; Thamoling; Temolyn; Shymylyng; Thacineling; Thacmoling
Tullow Abbey ^{#}		Augustinian Friars founded 1314 by Simon Lumbard and Hugh Talun who granted site; dissolved 1541?; granted to Thomas, Earl of Ormond, December 1557	Tully; Tullagh; Tealach-fortchern; Tuluch-ua-bfeidhlimidh; Tullowphelim; Tullyfelim; Laghia; The Black Abbey
Tullow Friary		Carmelite Friars, given in state papers and listed 1645 — no other evidence of foundation	Tully; Tullagh; Tealach-fortchern; Tuluch-ua-bfeidhlimidh; Tullowphelim; Tullyfelim; Laghia; The Black Abbey
Tullow Monastery ^{#}		early monastic site, founded 5th century?	Tully; Tullagh; Tealach-fortchern; Tuluch-ua-bfeidhlimidh; Tullowphelim; Tullyfelim; Laghia; The Black Abbey

Return to top of page

==== County Cavan ====
(For references and location detail see List of monastic houses in County Cavan)

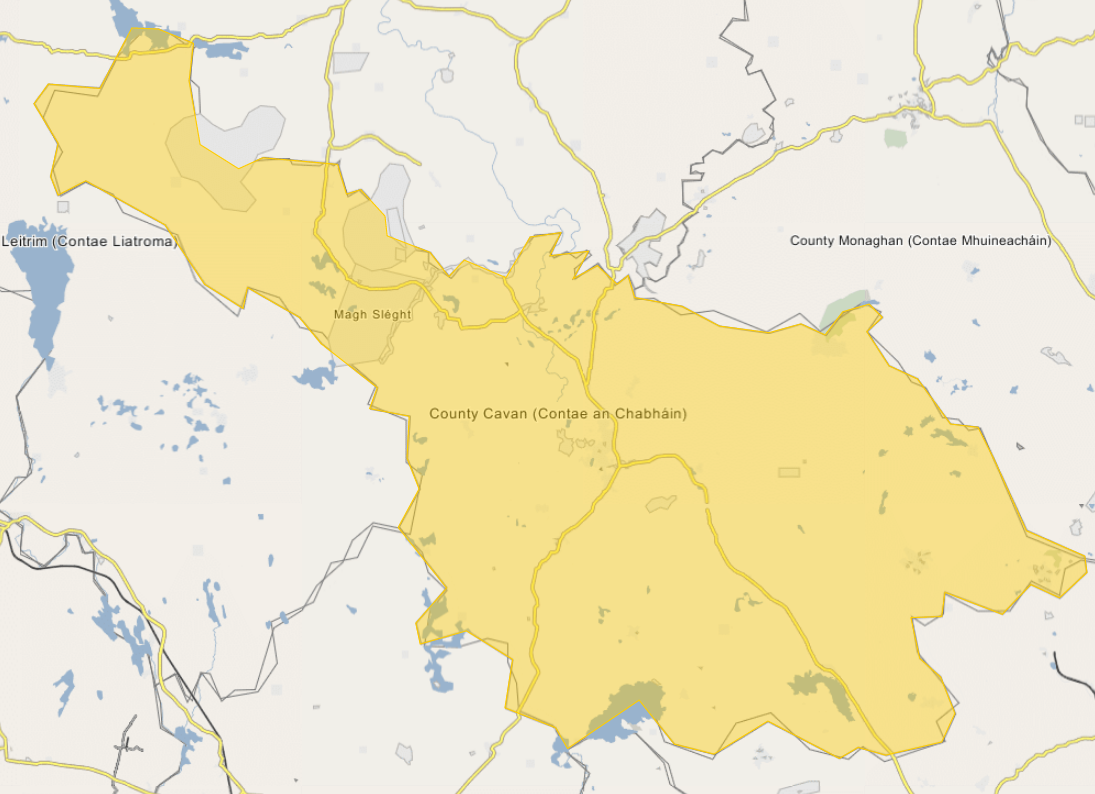
Locations of monastic houses in County Cavan

Foundation	Image	Communities & Provenance	Formal Name or Dedication & Alternative Names
Belturbet Monastery		early monastic site; remains of round tower 1906 (Note: John Cooke, Handbook for Travellers in Ireland, 1910, VII, Places of Interest, p.lvi)	
Cavan Friary		claims of Dominican Friars prior to Franciscans (Note: Cavan Dominicans — Thomas de Burgo, Hibernica Dominicana (ed. 1762), and others) — evidence lacking; Franciscan Friars, Third Order Regular founded c.1325-30 by Giolla O'Reilly (Gila-Isu Roe O'Reilly, Lord of Muintur-Maelmordha); Observant Franciscan Friars reformed 1499 or 1502 (1503); destroyed by fire with much of the town 1576, by a woman of the O'Reilly family; refounded dissolved 1608	The Friary Church of the Blessed Virgin Mary, Cavan ____________________; Cabhan; Brefinium
Drumlane Priory		Gaelic monks founded before 550, probably by St Colmcille (reputedly founded by St Maidoc, Bishop of Ferns, though already flourishing when he was born); Augustinian Canons Regular — Arroasian dependent on Kells, Meath; founded 1143-8?; dissolved 1570; granted for a term of 21 years to Hugh O'Reilly, head of the Brenie sept c.1570; nave still used for Divine Service until early 19th century	The Priory Church of Saint Mary, Drumlane ____________________; Drumlane Abbey; Dromlahan
Killinagh Monastery		early monastic site, founded early 6th century traditionally by St Brigid and St Laighne	Killineach
Killachad Abbey		founded before 800 by St Tigernach; plundered by the English late 12th century	
Kilmore Abbey ^{#+}		Gaelic monks founded 885 traditionally by St Fedlemid, who transferred his community from Slanore; parochial church built on site; raised to episcopal diocesan cathedral status 1452; new parochial church built 19th century, incorporating remnants believed to originate from the monastic site at Trinity Island; now the Church of Ireland cathedral	
Lough Oughter Abbey, Trinity Island		early monastic site; possible episcopal diocesan cathedral prior to transfer to Kilmore; Premonstratensian Canons daughter house of Loughkey; island granted to Loughkey by Cathal O'Reilly founded 1237 by Clarus MacMailin (MacMoylon), Archdeacon of Elphin; canons brought from Loughkey 1250; lost conventual status 1412; restored and regained conventual status 1444; granted for a period of 21 years to Hugh O'Reilly, Head of the Brenie sept 1570; found in 1585 that no payment received for over eleven years; dissolved 1585, though canons remained in occupation; ruinous by 1646	Trinity Priory; Loch-uachtair; Locha-uachtair; Lochwochdayr; Ballineval?
Slanore Monastery		Gaelic monks founded early 6th century by Colman mac Echdach; suggested to have been episcopal diocesan cathedral; (Note: Slanore Cathedral: O. Davies, Journal, Royal Society of Antiquaries of Ireland, lxxviii p.99) transferred to Kilmore by St Fedlemid	Snamluthir
Tomregan Monastery		Gaelic monks; traces of church and round tower (Note: Tomregan remains — Lord Killanin & M. V. Duignan, Shell Guide to Ireland, 1962, (new edition 1967), p.83)	Tuaim-dreacon; Tomregin
Urney Monastery		Gaelic monks; remains purported to be a church of the Bishop of Triburna (Kilmore) (Note: Urney Monastery remains — J. Meehan, The Catholic Encyclopedia, 1913-14, viii, p.643)	Urnaide

Return to top of page

==== County Clare ====
(For references and location detail see List of monastic houses in County Clare)

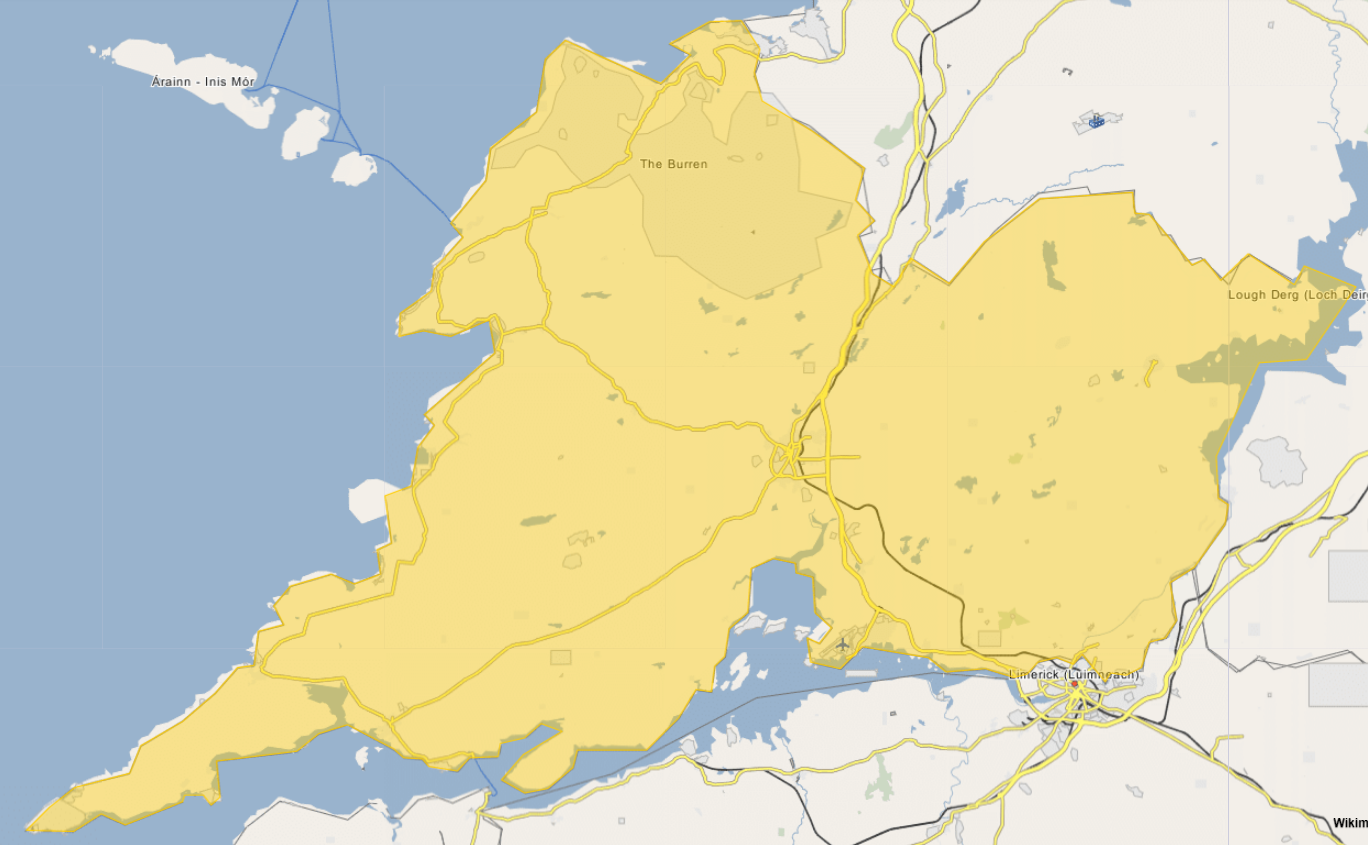
Locations of monastic houses in County Clare

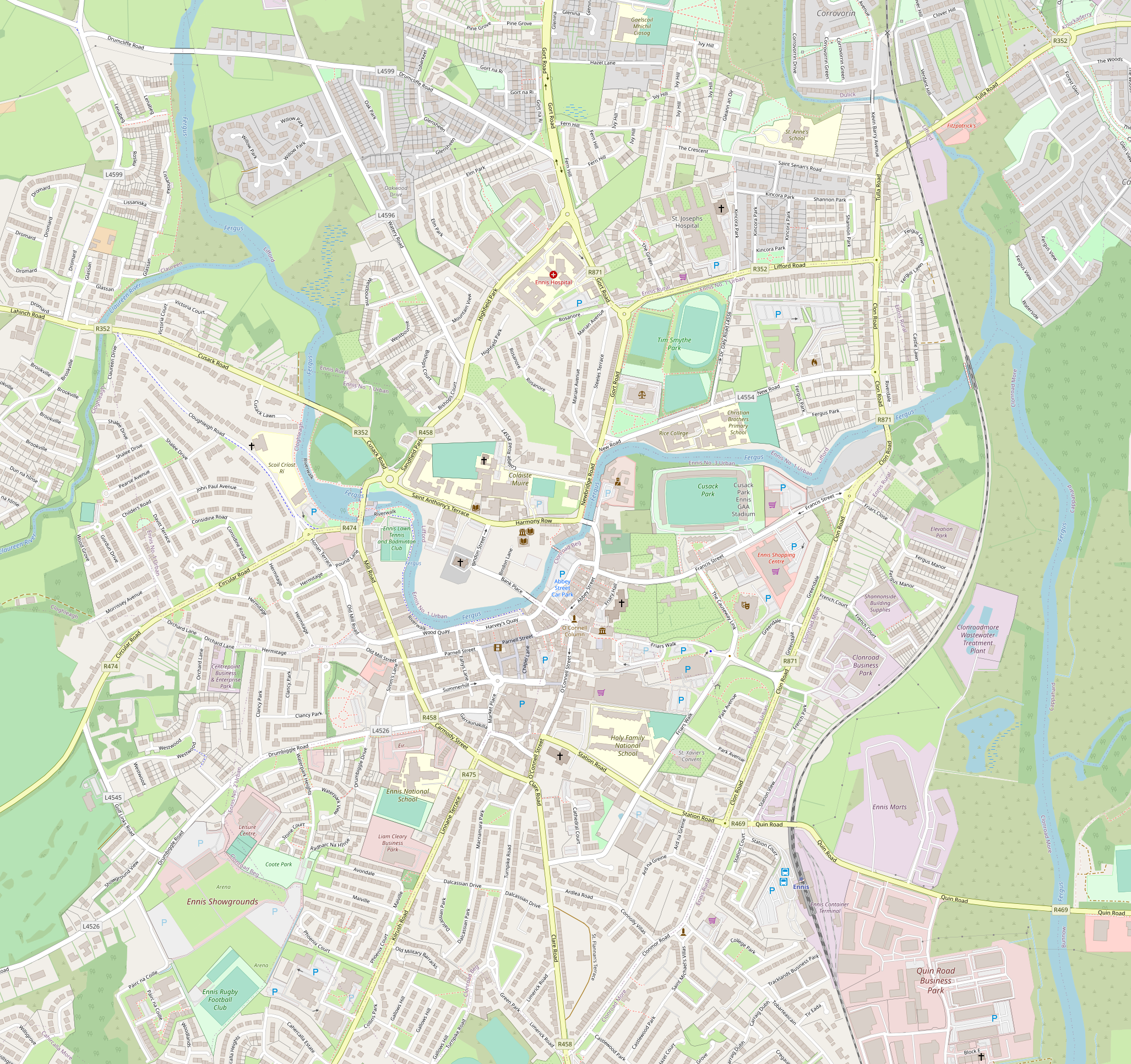
Locations of monastic houses in Ennis

Foundation	Image	Communities & Provenance	Formal Name or Dedication & Alternative Names
Behagh Friary ^{ø} (Irish: Mainistir na Beithí)		Franciscan Friars, Third Order Regular (Note: Behagh given as County Clare by Mervyn Archdall, Monasticon Hibernicum, 1786, p.43 (W. B. Kelly, Dublin, publication p.72), mis-citing Sir James Ware; local tradition of friary at Behagh in County Clare probably originate from Archdall's error) — probable mistaken identification of Beagh, County Galway	Beagh
Bishop's Island Monastery (Irish: Mainistir Oileán an Easpaig)		Gaelic monks founded 6th century by St Senan; remains of eremite monastery (Note: Bishop's Island remains of monastery, foundation attributed to St Senan — Lord Killanin & M. V. Duignan, Shell Guide to Ireland, 1962, (new edition 1967), p.321 (though not in 1989 edition))	
Canon Island Abbey (Irish: Mainistir Oileán na gCanánach)		Augustinian Canons Regular founded c.1180? by Donald O'Brien, King of Limerick, probably on site of early monastery (see immediately below); dissolved before 1577; granted to Henry, Earl of Thomond; (NM)	Inisnegananagh Priory; Inis-negananagh; Inis-negananagad; Insula Canonicorum; Elanagranoch; Elaunaganaghe; Island of Saints
Canon Island Monastery		early monastic site, probably founded by St Senan; site possibly later occupied by Augustinian abbey (see immediately above)	Inisnegananagh Priory; Inis-negananagh; Inis-negananagad; Insula Canonicorum; Elanagranoch; Elaunaganaghe; Island of Saints
Ceannindis Monastery ^{~}		early monastic site, founded 6th century by St Comgan of Killeshin; possibly located in County Clare	Cenn-indis; Cenn-innis
Clare Abbey, Clarecastle (Irish: Mainistir Chliara)		Augustinian Canons Regular founded before 1189 or 1191 by Donald O'Brien, King of Limerick; dissolved c.1543; granted to Henry, Earl of Thomond 1661; (NM)	The Abbey Church of Saint Peter and Saint Paul, Clareabbey ____________________; Clareabbey; Clar; Clair; Clayr; Cleara; de Forgio; Forgy
Corcomroe Abbey (Irish: Mainistir Chorca Mrua)		suggested early monastic site, Irish monks founded 1175?; Cistercian monks from Inish-lounaght; founded 1194/5, endowed by Donald O'Brien, King of Limerick; dissolved after 1600; granted to Richard Harding (date unknown); (NM)	The Abbey Church of Saint Mary of the Fertile Rock, Corcomroe ____________________; Corcomruad; Corcamer; Corcumro; Petra Fertili; Sancta Maria de Petra Fertili
Drim Friary (Irish: Mainistir an Droma)		Franciscan Friars — place of refuge; founded c.1740, expelled from Quin; dissolved 1820 (death of last friar)	
Drumcliff Monastery (Irish: Mainistir Dhrom Chléibh)		Gaelic monks founded 6th century reputedly by St Colmcille	
Dysert O Dea Monastery (Irish: Díseart Uí Dheá)		Gaelic monks founded before 735 by Tola; remains of 12th-century church on site	Dissert O'Dea; Disert O'Dea; Dysart O'Dea; Disert-Tola
Ennis Friary * (Irish: Mainistir na hInse)		Franciscan Friars Minor, Conventual founded 1240-7 (before 1242? or c.1284) by Donchad Cairbreach O'Brien (Donatus Carbrac O'Brien), King of Thomond; Observant Franciscan Friars reformed 1536-40 (1550); dissolved; granted to the Earl of Thomond 1578; granted to William Dongan Esq.; dissolved on the death of the last friar 1617; friars returned 1628; expelled 1651; friars returned c.1660; expelled 1693; in use as C.I. parish church 1615; Franciscan Friars founded 1841; acquired 1854; Provincial Novitiate House 1877; Novitiate House of the Irish Province 1902; extant	Nave: St Francis ____________________; Innse-an-laoigh; Inis-an-laoigh; Ennis-an-laoigh; Inis-cluan-ruada; Iniscluanramhfada
Ennis Nunnery ^{ø}		supposed nuns — erroneous interpretation (Note: Ennis nuns — Wars of Turlogh, (E. B. Fitzmaurice & A. G. Little, Materials for History of the Franciscan Province of Ireland pp.80-1) taken to refer to nuns; communications of Canice Mooney, OFM, point out that the word used,'caileach', translates as 'chalice', as opposed to 'cailleach' (nun))	
Ennis Monastery * (Irish: Mainistir Inis Caorach)		Poor Clares	
Enniskerry Monastery		early monastic site, oratory built by St Senan of Scattery	Mutton Island; Inis-caorach
Ennistimon Monastery (Irish: Mainistir Inis Díomáin)		Pre-existing parish church/chapel at the site, built after 1812. Monastery and school founded in 1824 by the Congregation of Christian Brothers. Residence at the site completed by May 1827. Later buildings include a primary school (1931) and nearby secondary school(1970).	Ennistymon; Omos-timain; Inis-tomen; Inis-diomain
Feenish Monastery ^{~}		Gaelic nuns founded (in the time of St Senan of Scattery) by St Brigid, daughter of Conchraid of the Mactail family?	Inis-fidhe; Fidh-inis; Cluain-fidhe; Finish (Irish: Mainistir Fhínse)
Glencolumbkille Abbey (Irish: Mainistir Ghleann Cholm Cille)		Columban monks founded by St Columcille; CI Church on site	Glan Columb-chille; Glann-columcille; Glenn-choluimchille; Glenn-coluimbcille
Illaunmore Monastery (Irish: Mainistir an Oileáin Mhóir)		Gaelic monks founded 7th/8th century; possibly not surviving after the 10th century (historically located in County Galway)	Oilenmor; Mucinis Monastery? (v. infra)
Illaunmore, ^{ø} Lough Derg		possible monastic site — order and period unknown	
Inchicronan Priory (Irish: Prióireacht Inse Chrónáin)		early monastic site, possibly founded 6th century by patron, St Cronan of Tuamgraney; (Note: Inchicronan "ruins of...Augustinian priory...on a site whose history goes back to St Crónán of Tuamgraney" — Lord Killanin & M. V. Duignan, Shell Guide to Ireland, 1962, (new edition 1967), p.184 (p.124 in 1989 edition)); Augustinian Canons Regular — from Clareabbey dependent on Clare; founded c.1198? by Donald O'Brien, King of Limerick, who granted the island to Clare; parish church 1302, built on the site of an earlier monastery; dissolved c.1543; restored and in use by 'friars' in the reign of Elizabeth; church restored for parochial use 1615 by Donogh, Earl of Thomond; granted to Henry, Earl of Thomond 1661; (NM)	Conventual Priory of St Mary, Ynyscronan (1421); ____________________; Inchycronayne; Inis-cronain; Inchycronayn
Inishcealtra Monastery, Inishcealtra (Holy Island)		early monastic site, founded 653 by St Camin, buried here; suggested Augustinian Canons Regular — evidence lacking	Iniskeltair Abbey; Iniscealtra; Inis Cealtra; Inishcaltra; Iniscaltra; Inis-celtra; Inis-keltair
Inisanlaoi Monastery (Irish: Prióireacht Inis an Lao)	monastic site, unknown order and foundation, actually Ennis Franciscan Friary (supra) (Note: Inislanlaoi — listed as a separate foundation at Ennis by Mervyn Archdall, Monasticon Hibernicum, 1786, p.77)		Inis-anlaoige
Inishloe Abbey (Irish: Mainistir Inis Lua)		Gaelic monks founded by Turlogh, King of Thomond, buried here; on an island in the Shannon Estuary between Scattery and Limerick (Note: Inishloe (Inislua) — location given by Mervyn Archdall Monasticon Hibernicum, 1786)	Inis-luaidh; Inis-lua
Inish-loinge		nuns, founded 6th century (in the time of St Senan), (Note: Inish-loinge — "penitentiarius de Inis-Lauidhe" — Acta Sanctorum ... Hiberniae, compiled by John Colgan, 1645, pp.537, 540) sited between Scattery and Limerick	Inis-luinge; Inishloinge
Inishmore Monastery (Irish: Mainistir Inis Mór)		tradition of early monastic site, founded 6th century by St Senan on Deer Island, but Canon Island possibly the site of this foundation of Senan's	Inchmore; Deer Island?
Inis-tuaischert (Irish: Inis Tuaiscirt)		early monastic site, founded 6th century by St Senan, possibly County Clare, possibly a small island in the Fergus Estuary	
Kilballyowen Monastery (Irish: Mainistir Chill Bhaile Eoghain)		monastic site, unknown foundation and order church built to the south of the site, now in ruins in a cemetery	
Kilcarragh Monastery (Irish: Mainistir Chill Chathrach)		hospital or monastery; granted to John King	
Kilfarboy Monastery ^{ø~} (Irish: Cill Fear Buí)		early monastic site, also given as Kilfobrick, County Meath (Note: Kilfarboy — given as Kilfobrick — Mervyn Archdall, Monasticon Hibernicum, 1786, p.52)	Cell-fobric; Kilfobrick
Kilfenora Monastery ^{+} (Irish: Cill Fhionnúrach)		Celtic monks, purportedly founded by St Fachnan (possibly Fachtnan, founder of Ross Carbery) probably continuing after 1111; episcopal diocesan cathedral probably by 1152; extant	Fenabore; Cell-fionnabrach; Cell-findabrach; Cell-umabrach; Fynabore
Killadusert Monastery (Irish: Cill an Dísirt)		Gaelic monks founder unknown	Killadysert; Disert-murthaile; Kildysert
Killaloe Monastery (Irish: Mainistir Chill Lua)		Gaelic monks founded 10th century; episcopal diocesan cathedral 1111 monastery probably continuing after 1111 and throughout the 12th century, though evidence lacking; church becoming CI cathedral 1546	Laonia; Cell-da-lua; Kildalua
Killinaboy Monastery (Irish: Cill Iníne Baoith)		early monastic site, founded by Iníon Bhaoith	
Killone Abbey (Irish: Mainistir Chill Eoin)		Augustinian Nuns founded c.1189 (or monks founded 1120) by Donald O'Brien, King of Limerick on site owned by Clare Abbey; dissolved before 1584; ruinous by 1617; now in the grounds of Newhall House, with public access	The Abbey Church of Saint John the Baptist, Killone ____________________; Killoen; St John de Thomon
Kilnagallech Monastery ^{~} (Irish: Cill na gCailleach		Gaelic nuns probable cell	Kinagalliagh; Kilnagellech; Cell-eochaille; Cell-na-Caillech; Kill-nac-caillech
Kilshanny Abbey (Irish: Mainistir Chill Seanaigh		Augustinian Canons Regular founded c.1194 by Donal Mor O'Brien, King of Thomond; dissolved before 1581?; granted to Robert Hickman	probably St Mary and St Augustine ____________________; Kilshonny; Cell-seanaig; Kil-feanye; Kil-teanna; Kyllsenayd
Mucinis Monastery ^{~} (Irish: Mainistir Mhuicinse)		early monastic site, plundered by Norsemen 922; possibly County Clare, either at Hog Island or Lough Derg	Muicinis Riagail; Muck-inis; Hog Island; Pig Island possibly Illaunmore (v. supra)
Noughaval Monastery (Irish: Mainistir Nuachabhála)		Gaelic monks founded by St Mogua	Nuachongbhail
Oughtmama Monastery (Irish: Mainistir Ucht Máma)		early monastic site, associated with three saints named St. Colmán, one from Ceinéal Laoghaire of Meath, one from Eoghanachta of Munster, and one from Uí Bhriúin of Connacht	Ucht Máma
Quin Abbey (Irish: Mainistir Chuinche)		Franciscan Friars Minor, Conventual founded 1402; Observant Franciscan Friars reformed 1433 by Macon MacNamara; dissolved 1541, though friars remained in occupation; granted to Conor O'Brien, Baron Ibracken 1543; confirmed to the Earls of Thomond 1577; granted to Sir Tirlagh O'Brien, of Irishdyman 1583; burnt 1584; repaired and refounded by Roman Catholics 1604; friars expelled 1617; returned c.1626; friars expelled 1637; (NM)	Quin Friary; Quinchy
Rath Monastery ^{#} (Irish: Mainistir na Rátha)		Gaelic monks founded by St Blathmac; stump of round tower demolished 1838	Rathblathmaic
Rossmanagher Monastery (Irish: Mainistir Ros mBeannchair)		Gaelic nuns	Ros-bendchuir; Ross-Bennchoir
Scattery Island Monastery (Irish: Mainistir Inis Caorach)		Celtic monks founded 6th century by St Senan (or by St Patrick); granted to the Mayor and Corporation of Limerick c.1577	Inishscattery
Tomfinlough Monastery (Irish: Mainistir Thuaim Fhionnlocha)		Gaelic monks; probably not continuing after the 10th century; site now occupied by remains of Tomfinlough church	Finlough
Tomgraney Abbey (Irish: Mainistir Thuaim Gréine)		Gaelic monks	Tomgrany; Tuamgranney; Tuamgraney
Tulla Abbey (Irish: Mainistir na Tulaí)		Gaelic monks	

Return to top of page

==== County Cork ====
(For references and location detail see List of monastic houses in County Cork)

Locations of monastic houses in County Cork
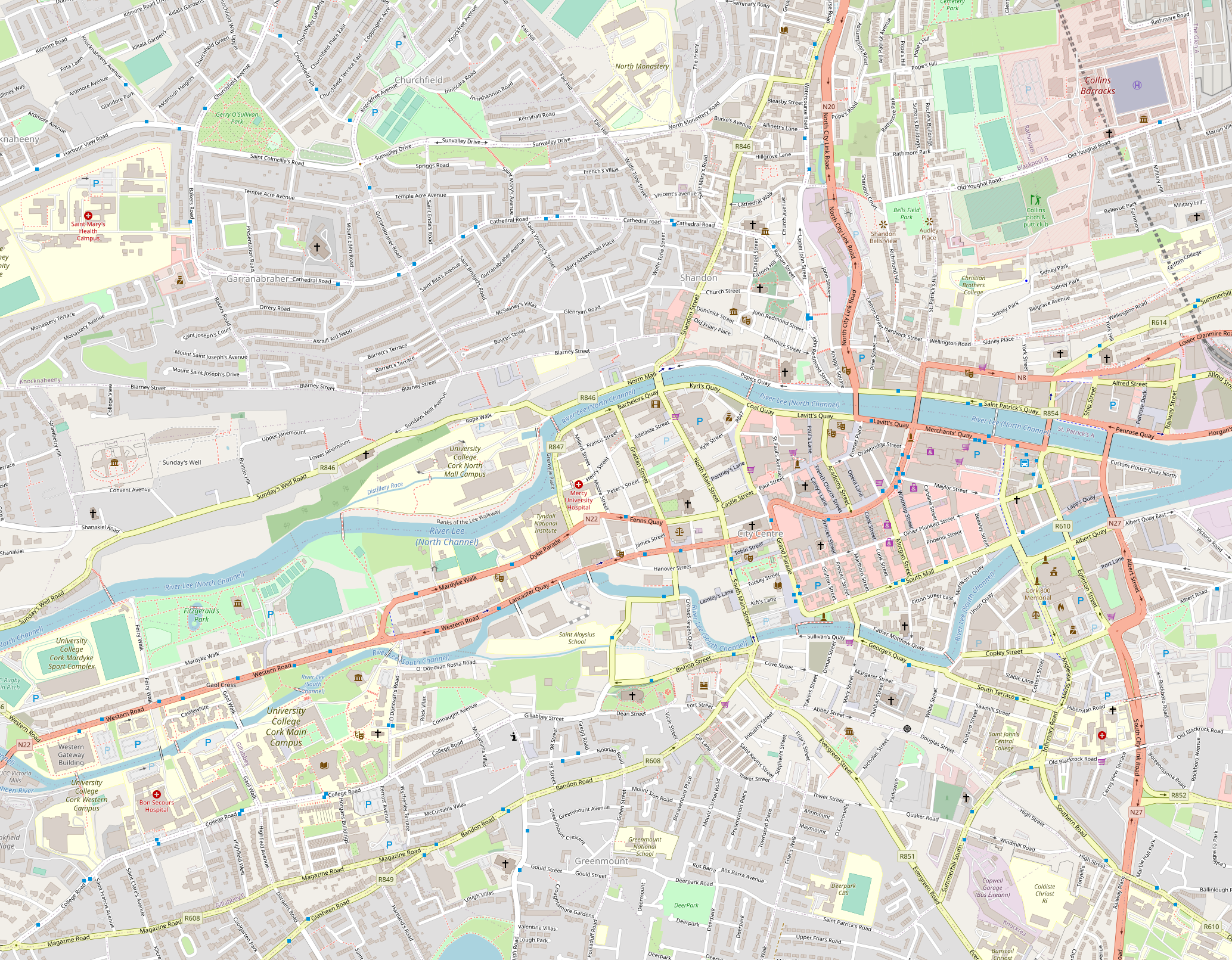
Locations of monastic houses in County Cork
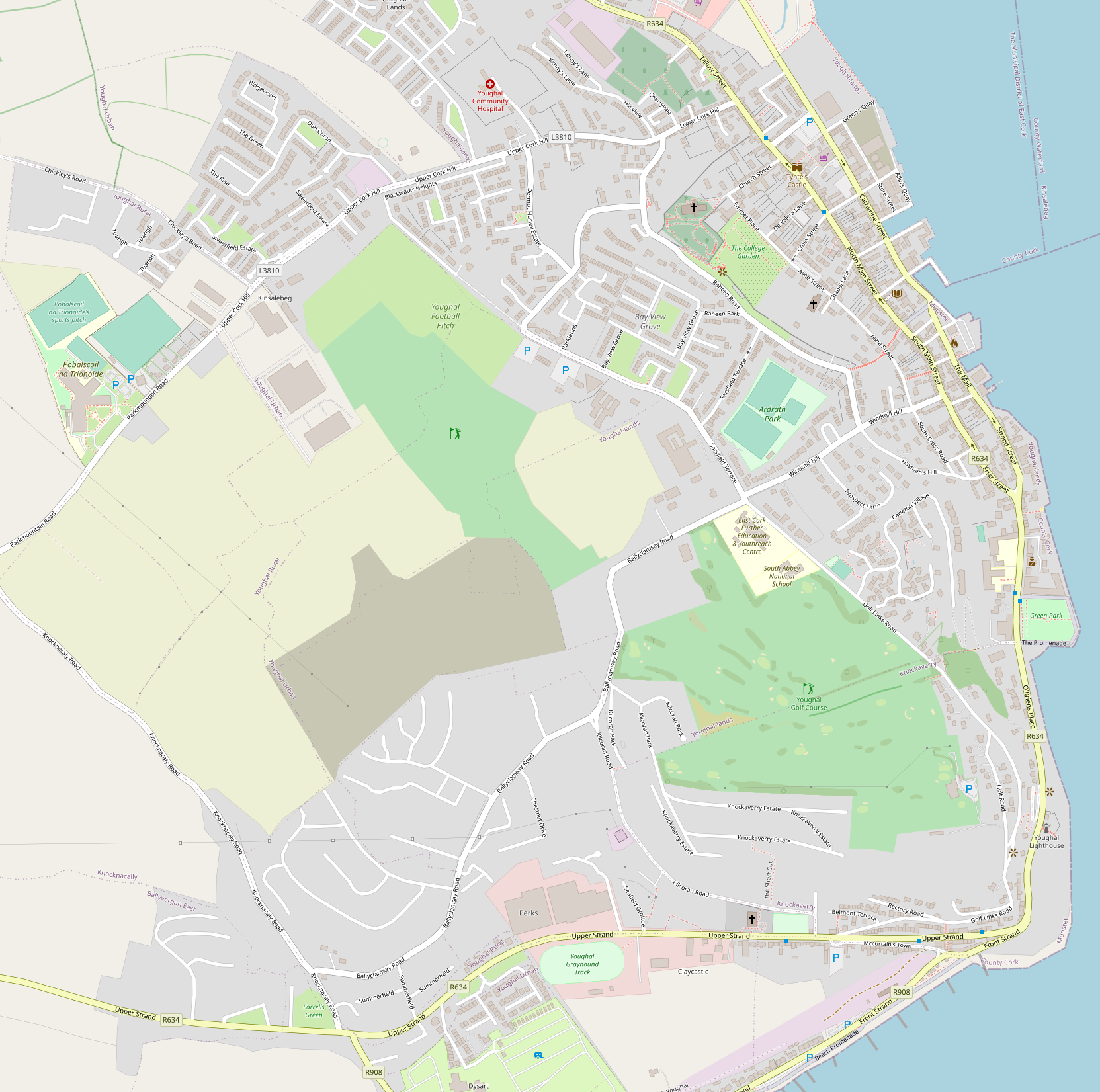
Locations of monastic houses in Youghal

Foundation	Image	Communities & Provenance	Formal Name or Dedication & Alternative Names
Abbeymahon Abbey		Cistercian monks — from Baltinglass, County Wicklow; (community founded at Aghamanister 1172); transferred from Aghamanister before 1278; founded 1278 by Count McSheribay; jurors deemed the church to have been in parochial use from time immemorial February 1541; dissolved 1541; leased to Viscount Barrymore 1568; leased to Nicholas Walshe, Justice of Munster, 1584; granted in perpetuity to Walshe 1587	Abbey Mahon Abbey; Fons Vivus; Maun; Maure; O'Manne; Ui-Badamna; O'Badvine; Obalvine
Abbeystrowry Abbey		Cistercian monks — from Abbeymahon founded after 1228 possibly restored as an abbey before 1281, and shortly failed; dissolved after 1281; cell of Abbeymahon from 1281; dissolved c.1541	Strowry Abbey; Mainistre-Inscorrye; Shrowry; Flumen Vivum?
Aghadown Monastery		early monastic site, Gaelic monks round tower standing until 18th century	Aughadown; Achad-duine
Aghamanister Abbey		Cistercian monks — from Baltinglass; founded 1172 by Dermot MacCormac MacCarthy, King of Desmond dissolved before 1278: transferred to Abbeymahon	Ui Badamna; Abbey
Ballybeg Priory		Augustinian Canons Regular founded 1229 by Philip de Barry; dissolved 1541; granted to George Bouchier, Esq c.1573 (who forfeited for non-payment of rent); granted to Stephen Walter of Cork in 1583	St Thomas
Ballygarvan Monastery ^{~}, Carrigaline parish		supposed monastic site — order, foundation and period unknown	
Ballymacadane Abbey		Augustinian nuns founded c.1450? by Cormac MacCarthy MacTiege Laider; dissolved1539?; site granted to Franciscan Friars (see immediately below)	Balie-macedan; Bally-macedan; Bally-magadain; Bally-vacadane
Ballymacadane Friary		Franciscan Friars, Third Order Regular founded after 1539? on site of Augustinian nunnery (see immediately above); dissolved before 1584?	Balie-macedan; Bally-macedan; Bally-magadain; Bally-vacadane
Ballynoe Monastery ^{~ø}		supposed monastic site — order and period unknown, suggested Knights Hospitaller (Note: Cork Historical and Archaeological Society, xxiv, p.129)	Baile-nua-na-sagart
Ballyvourney Abbey		Gaelic nuns founded 650 (6th or 7th century) by St Abban, for St Gobonate; possibly continuing after 1111; dissolved before 1172? Franciscan Friars, Third Order Regular	Ballvourney; Baile-Mhuirne; Baile-boirne
Bantry Friary		Franciscan Friars Minor, Conventual founded c.1460 (existing by 1466), 1307? (Note: Luke Wadding: Analecta Hibernica No.6, vol ii, p.156) 1320 (Note: Analecta Hibernica No.6, vol iii p.195)); Observant Franciscan Friars reformed 1482 by Fr David Hiarlaighy; Observant Franciscan Friars 1522-32; nominally suppressed 1541-2; friars reportedly expelled on several occasions (Note: Louis Augustin Alemand, Monasticum Hibernicum, translated and edited by John Stevens, 1722) by the English during the reign of Elizabeth I; demolished by Daniel O'Sullivan of Beare; refounded; dissolved 1580 and occupied by the English; O'Sullivan promised to rebuild house 1602	Beanntraighe; Bendtraigi
Bawnatemple Monastery		early monastic site, Gaelic monks (Note: Lord Killanin & M. V. Duignan, Shell Guide to Ireland, 1962, (new edition 1967) p.166)	
Bridgetown Abbey		Augustinian Canons Regular — Victorine — from Newtown Trim and St Thomas, Dublin founded 1206-16 by Alexander Fitz Hugh; dissolved c.1545; obtained by Roger Pope of Grangegorman, surrendered to Sir Henry Sidney, Lord Deputy, 1576-7; held by Viscount of Fermoy 1588; granted to Ludovick Briskell 1595	St Mary ____________________; Bridge Town Priory; Baile-an-dorchid; Balindroghed; Balindregh; Pons Fermoy; Villa-Pontis
Brigown Monastery		early monastic site, Gaelic monks founded by 6th century? St Abban; possibly not continuing after 10th century; round tower fell 1720	Brigobann; Mitchelstown
Buttevant Friary		Franciscan Friars Minor, Conventual founded 1251 (Note: Annals of the Four Masters, ed. J. O'Donovan, 1848-51) (1276-9 (Note: Canice Mooney, OFM, Terminus; vol i, p.128) or 1290) by David Oge Barry (David de Barry), Lord Buttevant; nominally suppressed 1540; dissolved 1559 (during the reign of Elizabeth I); Observant Franciscan Friars refounded 1609-29; re-occupied from Restoration to after 1800; (NM)	Ecclesia Tumulorum; Bothon; Buton; Killenenagh; Killnamullagh; Botha-finn
Buttevant Nunnery		purported nunnery — evidence lacking	St Owen or St John the Baptist
Carrigillihy Monastery ^{ø}, Myross parish		unknown or doubtful establishment, supposedly Cistercian monks; founded 1172 by Dermot MacCarthy, King of Desmond; dissolved; granted to Nicholas Walshe, in perpetuity c.1587; ruins erroneously attributed as Maure Abbey (Note: Charles Smith, MD, The ancient and present state of the county and city of Cork (1750), ed. 1815 i. p.263) (actually Abbeymahon)	Carigillihy; Curraghalicky; Abbey de Sancto Mauro
Castlecor ^{~}		supposed monastic site — order, foundation and period unknown; apparent abbey at Castle Corinth (Note: given in plea roll 30, K. Ed I)	Castle Corith
Castlelyons Friary		Carmelite Friars founded 1307-9 (1324) from within the de Barry family, (John de Barry (Note: James Ware, De Hibernia, et Antiquitatibus ejus, edition of 1654, p.198 - mistook order as Franciscans: cf E. B. Fitzmaurice & A. G. Little, Materials for History of the Franciscan Province of Ireland, 1920, p.90)), who had been granted license to alienate an area of land for a Carmelite friary 11 August 1309, but inhibited being without papal license; dissolved c.1541; granted to Viscount Barrymore 1568; restored by c.1737; now Castlemartyr	Castle Lyons; Castelio; Castleyhane; Castelleaghan; Castrileonensis
Castlemartyr Priory		Carmelite monks	
Cecilstown ^{~}		supposed monastic site — order and period unknown	
Clear Island Monastery		early monastic site, Gaelic monks founded by St Ciaran of Seirkieran	Inis-cleire; Traigh-Chiarain
Clogagh Friary ^{ø}		Franciscan Friars, Third Order Regular foundation called a 'little abbey', (Note: 17 K.James I: 'King's Collections', manuscripts compiled by Dr Madden, late 17th century, revised by Harris, NLI and TCD (Mervyn Achdall, Monasticon Hibernicum, 1786)) doubtful a community existed here	Cloggagh; Cloig-theach
Clonmeen Monastery ^{≈}		Augustinian Canons Regular founded by Mr O'Callaghan (the O'Callaghan family, (Note: Charles Smith, MD, The ancient and present state of the county and city of Cork (1750), edited 1815, i, p.294 - listed at Clonmine by Lubin) possible erroneous reference to Clonmines, County Wexford (Note: Louis Augustin Alemand, Monasticum Hibernicum, translated and edited by John Stevens, 1722) "site of monastery" (Note: Ordnance Survey)	Clonmere; Cluain-min; Clonmines (County Wexford)?; Clonmine?
Cloyne Cathedral Monastery and Nunnery		early monastic site, purported nunnery, (Note: Charles Smith, MD, The ancient and present state of the county and city of Cork (1750), edited 1815, i p.138) apparently erroneous reference to Killeedy (Cluainchreduil), County Limerick; founded 6th century by Colman mac Lenine; destroyed many times by Vikings;	St Ite ____________________; Cluain-uama; Cluain-vama; Killeedy (Cluainchreduil) (County Limerick)?
Coole Monastery		early monastic site, founded 6th century? by St Abban	Cuil-collingi; Cul-collingi; Cul-collainge; Cul-chuillinghe; Cilculen
Coole Abbey		Franciscan Friars	Cuil-collingi; Cul-collingi; Cul-collainge; Cul-chuillinghe; Cilculen
Coole Preceptory		Knights Templar founded 1296 by a de Barry	Cuil-collingi; Cul-collingi; Cul-collainge; Cul-chuillinghe; Cilculen
Conna Preceptory ^{ø}		purported Knights Hospitaller (Note: Cork Historical and Archaeological Society, xxxiv. p.129)	
Cork Augustinian Priory *		Augustinian Canons Regular built 1780; extant	
Cork Monastery ^{#}		early monastic site, founded 600 by St Finbar (Bairre); site probably now occupied by St Finbarre's Cathedral	Corcagh; Corcaigh
Cork Hospital and Cell		Benedictine monks dependent on Waterford founded c.1191; united to Bath before 1204; dissolved 1536	Cell or hospital of St John the Evangelist, Cork
Cork — St Sepulchre's Priory ^{ø}		Benedictine monks — held by St Nicholas's Priory, Exeter, sometime having a prior, though no community here	
Cork Priory		Benedictine?-Augustinian nuns founded 1297 on the wishes of Agnes de Hareford, on the findings of enquiry by John Wogan, Justiciar, on direction of the Crown; dissolved before 1540?	St John the Baptist
Cork Augustinian Abbey		Augustinian Friars founded 14th/15th century before 1306 (Note: Cork Historical Journal, 61 (1956), earliest contemporary record, Will of John de Wynchedon, bequests to the friary and requesting burial in there)) (during the reign of Edward I (Note: James Ware, De Hibernia, et Antiquitatibus ejus, edition of 1654)) by Lord Kinsale; Observant Augustinian Friars 1472 to 1475 and 1484; dissolved 1540; granted to Cormac MacCarthy c.1576	The Abbey Church of the Most Holy Trinity ____________________; Red Abbey Tower
Cork Black Friary		Dominican Friars founded 1229 by Lord Philip de Barry; Observant Dominican Friars reformed 1484; dissolved 1540-1; granted to William Boureman 20 December 1543; bought by Brown and Goule; request by the Earl of Desmond to return the friary to the Dominicans 1557 - uncertain whether the Dominicans regained the friary from the purchasers; granted to Sir John King 1616; (subsequent history J. P. O'Heyne, O.P. Irish Dominicans (Epilogue Chronology ...), translated by A. Coleman, O.P., 1902, 1706 and A. Coleman, O.P., The Ancient Dominican Foundations of Ireland, 1902)	St Mary de Insula
Cork - St. Mary's Dominican Church and Priory		Dominican Friars; Novitate extant	St Mary
Cork — Gill Abbey		daughter house of Cong; founded 1136-7? by Cormac Mac Carthy; dissolved 1542-4; granted c.1590 to Cormac MacCarthy and Sir Richard Grenville; CI Church on site	St John the baptist (correctly St John the Evangelist) ____________________; Antro S. Finarri; Weem; Weym
Cork — St Stephen's Priory		founded before 1295; converted to the Blue-coat Hospital 1674	
Cork Grey Friary		Franciscan Friars Minor, Conventual founded 1214 by Dermot Mor MacCarthy Reagh; built c.1229-31, benefactors the de Barrys and Prendergasts; Observant Franciscan Friars reformed 1500; dissolved and abandoned 1540; granted to Andrew Skydy c.1565	St Mary's Shandon ____________________; Seandun; Shandon
Cork Franciscan Friary *		founded 1609; extant	
Cork Nunnery ^{~}		Benedictine (Note: William Dugdale, Monasticon Anglicanum, edited by Dodsworth & Dugdale, i, edition of 1682, ii edition of 1673 — possible reference to sisters at Benedictine hospital-cell) or Augustinian (Note: Dr. Cochrane (Cork Archaeological and Historical Society, xviii, p.124)) nuns license granted following petition by Agnes de Hareford, a recluse of Cork, and enquiry by John Wogan, Justiciar 1297, on the direction of the Crown; founded c.1327 by William de Barry who, with John de Barry, John FitzGilbert and Philip FitzRobert granted endowments to Agnes and others nuns; possibly on site later occupied by Market House	St John the Baptist
Cork Nunnery ^{ø}		supposed Benedictine nuns	
Cork Preceptory		Knights Hospitaller (mistakenly given as Knights Templar (Note: Mervyn Archdall, Monasticon Hibernicum, 1768, p.68)) hospice rather than regular preceptory, founded before 1212, confirmed to the Hospitallers by Innocent III; built 1292; dissolved 16th century?; passed to the Crown	St John the Baptist ____________________; Sancti Johannis de Corcag
Creggane Friary	supposed Franciscan Friars transferred from Timoleague, arising from a misreading		Crecan in Ibane; Cregane
Cullen Monastery ^{ø}		purported Gaelic nuns, founded by St Laitrian (Lasair Fhiona) — ruins near a church held to have belonged to an ancient nunnery, (Note: Charles Smith, MD, The ancient and present state of the county and city of Cork (1750), edited 1815, i, p.294) latterly under erenaghs	Cuillenn Ui Chiuv
Dal Modula ^{~}		early monastic site, possibly located in County Cork	
Donaghmore Monastery		founded by St Fingene or St Laichtin (Lachtain) of Freshford; now parochial church	Donoughmore; Donnoughmore; Domnach-mor-mitaine
Fermoy Monastery ^{#?}		Cistercian monks — from Inishlounaght founded 1170 by Donal Mor O'Brien; dissolved 1542; granted to Tibold Roch, son of Viscount Roch, before 1570; granted to Sir Richard Grenville c.1590	Castrum Dei; M-fearmaighe; Armoy; Fearmaigh; Iormoy
Garinish Monastery		Gaelic nuns founded before c.530	Kilchuillin; Ilane-i-Cullin; Illnacullen
Glanworth Abbey		Dominican Friars founded 1475 (Note: Urban Flanagan, O.P.) (1227 (Note: Charles Smith, MD, The ancient and present state of the county and city of Cork (1750), edited 1815)) by the Roche family; officially suppressed February 1541, though apparently still in occupation during the reign of Elizabeth I; restored; dissolved c.1578, leased to three laymen; held by the Viscount of Fermoy 1588; subsequent history J. P. O'Heyne, O.P. Irish Dominicans, (Note: (Epilogue Chronology ...), translated by A. Coleman, O.P., 1902) 1706, T. de Burgo, Hibernica Dominicana, edition of 1762 and Daphne Pochin Mould, The Irish Dominicans, p. 126	Priory of the Holy Cross ____________________; Glenn-amhnach; Glenn-amain; Glanore
Goleen Friary		Franciscan Friars Minor, Conventual founded before 1442	Gahannyh Friary?
Gouganebarra Monastery		early monastic site, Gaelic monks founded 6th century, retreat of St Finbarre prior to his founding Cork	Gougane Barra; Gobhagnabarra
Inishcarra Monastery		early monastic site, Gaelic monks founded by St Senan, who left a community of disciples; dissolved	Iniscarra; Iniscara; Inis-cara by Lua; Tuaim-nava
Inishleena Monastery		Gaelic monks and nuns, reputedly founded by St Finbarre	Cellmagciun
Iniskieran Monastery		Franciscan friars founded 1460 by Florence Moar O'Driscoll	Clear Island Monastery
Kilbeacon Monastery		Gaelic monks; founded 650 by St Abban	
Kilcatherine Cell		Celtic nuns founded by St Caitiarn, niece of St Senan; double monastery	Cell Catigern; Cell-chatiern; Cell-chatigern
Kilcrea Friary		Observant Franciscan Friars founded 1465-78 (1470, (Note: James Ware, De Hibernia, et Antiquatibus ejus, edition of 1654) 1478, (Note: Harris's Table in Ware-Harris, Antiquities, 1745) (Note: Canice Mooney, O.F.M., Terminus, 1954, pp. 248–9)) by Cormac Mac Thady MacCarthy More, King of Desmond, Lord of Muskerry; officially suppressed 1542, friars remaining in occupancy under the protection of the MacCarthy family; dissolved 1577; granted on lease for 21 years to Sir Cormock MacCarthy (Cormac mac Teige MacCarthy), who left the Friars in occupancy; church plundered by English soldiers 1584; restored 1589 under Cormac mac Dermot MacCarthy; sacked 1599; restored 1604; dissolved 1614, fell into Protestant possession, friars expelled c.1614; damaged buildings repaired by Fr. John Gold, 1621; granted by Oliver Cromwell to Lord Broghill 1641; in trusteeship of Commissioners of Public Works 1892; (NM)	Cell-credhe; (cf. Kilkeary)
Kilcrea Nunnery		purportedly founded 6th century by St Cere	
Kilcrumper Monastery		early monastic site, Gaelic monks, founded 6th century? by St Abban, probably on a site north of Ui Liathain; Benedictine monks; bestowed on Glascarrig 15th century	Cill Cruimthir; Ceallcruimthir
Kilkilleen Monastery ^{ø~}		supposed monastic site - order, foundation and period unknown — "Friary in ruins" (Note: Ordnance Survey)	
Killabraher Monastery ^{ø~}		supposed monastic site — order and period unknown	
Killaconenagh Monastery		Gaelic nuns founded 6th century? by St Abban, after his founding Magee	Killachad conchean?; Killachadconchean
Killeenemer Monastery			
Kilmaclenine Monastery		early monastic site, Gaelic monks, probably founded before 606 by St Colman mac Leinin of Cloyne	Cell-mac-leinin
Kilmoney Priory		Augustinian Canons Regular cell, dependent on Gill Abbey founded ?; probably a vicarage after mid-14th century; dissolved before 1400(?); 'Abbey' site given in Memorial Atlas of Ireland 1901	
Kilnamanagh Monastery		Gaelic nuns, foundation named for Ana, sister of St Caitiarn of Kilcatherine and niece of St Senan	Kilmana
Kilnamarbhan Monastery		early monastic site, founded 6th century? by St Abban	
Kilshanahan Monastery ^{ø~}		supposed monastic site — unknown order or foundation, "Ruined abbey and church" (Note: Memorial Atlas of Ireland, 1901)	
Kinneigh Monastery		Gaelic monks founded by St Colman; possibly not surviving after 10th century	Cell-mor-Cinnech; Cell-mor-Ceanneich
Kinsale Friary ^{*}		Carmelite Friars founded 1334 (Note: Charles Smith, MD, The ancient and present state of the county and city of Cork (1750), edition of 1815, i, p.219) (during the reign of Edward III (Note: James Ware, De Hibernia, et Antiquitatibus ejus, edition of 1654)) by Robert fitz Richard Balrain; dissolved 1541 (1543); Queen Elizabeth I; rebuilt 2003-2006; extant	The Friary Church of the Blessed Virgin Mary; the Friary Church of Our Lady of Mount Carmel ____________________; Kinsale Abbey; Kynsalle; Cenn-saile
Kinsale Monastery		early monastic site, founded by St M'Eilte Ogh (M'eltioc)	St Gobban ____________________; Kynsalle; Cenn-saile
Labbamolaga Monastery		Gaelic monks founded 7th century by St Molaga of Timoleague, reputedly buried here	Leaba-molaga; Tampailin; Tulach-min-molaga?
Legan Abbey, Monkstown		Benedictine monks, daughter house of Waterford Priory dependent on Waterford and Bath; founded sometime before 1301 (after 1204); dissolved before 1350?	Liegane, in Monkstown
Loch-eire Monastery		early monastic site, purportedly founded by St Finbarr	
Lough Ine Monastery		probable early monastic site, Gaelic monks	Lough Hyne; Templebreedy
Lueim Monastery ^{ø}		supposed monastic site — order and foundation unknown; mentioned 1318 (Note: 'King's Collections', manuscripts compiled by Dr Madden, late 17th century, revised by Harris, NLI and TCD (as cited by Mervyn Archdall, Monasticon Hibernicum, 1786) p.74)	
Midleton Abbey ^{#}		Cistercian monks — from Monasteranenagh founded 1179/80, purportedly by the FitzGerald family (Note: Leopold Janauschek, Originum Cisterciensium, 1877) (or the Barry family (Note: Gasparis Jongelini, Notitia Abbatiarum ordines Cisterciensis per orbem universum, 1640 (Louis Augustin Alemand, Monasticum Hibernicum, translated and edited by John Stevens, 1722))); transferred from Monasteranenagh 1180; dissolved before 1573 (1543); abbot and convent remained as tenants after 1548; granted to John FitzEdmond FitzGerald 1573 and 1575; destroyed 19th century; Baptist church of St John reputedly occupies the site	The Abbey Church of Saint Mary of Chore ____________________ de Choro Sancti Benedicti; Castra-na-chore; Chorus S. Benedicti; Monasterore; Middleton; M-na-chore
Monanimy Commandery ^{ø}		purported Knights Templar	Monanimy Preceptory
Mourne Abbey		(erroneously given as Knights Templar (Note: erroneous reference by Mervyn Archdall, Monasticon Hibernicum, 1786, p.75)) founded before 1216 (during the reign of King John) by Alexander de Sancta Helena; later, Knights Hospitaller	Mourne Preceptory; Ballynamona Preceptory; M-na-mona; Morne; Meny Nymone; Ballinemony
The Priory, Newmarket			
Nohaval Monastery		early monastic site, Gaelic monks, reputedly founded by St Finian; formerly site of a round tower (Note: Ordnance Survey)	Nuachongbhail; Nogoual
Nohavaldaly Monastery		early monastic site, Gaelic monks; reported stump of round tower (Note: Charles Smith, MD, The ancient and present state of the county and city of Cork (1750), edition of 1815, i, p.294)	St Finian ____________________; Nuachongbhail; Nohaval-daly
Omolaggie Monastery		early monastic site Augustinian Canons Regular possibly dependent on Cong	
Quchwill Abbey		abbey mentioned in 1355 (Note: 'King's Collections', manuscripts compiled by Dr Madden, late 17th century, revised by Harris, NLI and TCD (as cited by Mervyn Archdall, Monasticon Hibernicum, 1786), p.76) — probable reference Gill Abbey, or possibly Youghal	
Ross Priory		early monastic site, founded 590 by Saint Fachnan Mougach unconfirmed suggestion of Augustinian Canons Regular (Note: Dr Cochrane, Cork Historical and Archaeological Society, xviii, p.125); Benedictine monks dependent on St James, Wurzburg; founded before 1148?; reportedly ruinous by February 1541; dissolved 1541	The Priory Church of Saint Mary, Rosscarbery ____________________; Rosscarbery; Rosailithir; Ross-ailithir; Ruis-ailithir; Ross Carberry
Ross in Munster		Augustinian Friars, dubious supposed foundation in Ros Carbery	
Ross Friary		Franciscan Friars, dubious foundation (Note: tentative reference, Louis Augustin Alemand, Monasticum Hibernicum, translated and edited by John Stevens, 1722, pp.249, 266)	
Sherkin Friary		Observant Franciscan Friars founded 1460 by Florence O'Driscoll, Magnus (Note: Analecta Hibernica (Irish Manuscript Commission), No.6, Nov. 1934, ii, p.157) or 1470 by Dermit O'Driscoll, (Note: James Ware, De Hibernia, et Antiquitatibus ejus, edition of 1654) papal license granted 1449, at the petition of Fynin Ohedustoy (Fineen O'Driscoll), to found an Observant friary; though no reference to building before 1460 or 1462; dissolved: plundered and burnt 1537 (or 1538), friars removed to the mainland; rebuilt; 1578 restored; granted to John Bealing 1590; friars began to rebuild friary 1627; (NM)	Sherkin Island Abbey
Skeam West Monastery ^{ø}		possible early monastic site, Gaelic monks	Skream Island West
Spike Island Monastery^{ø~}		possible early monastic site, possibly located in County Cork or Carrig Island, County Kerry	Inispict; Inispuinc
Spittle Bridge Monastery		Gaelic monks	
Strawhall Monastery		early monastic site, Gaelic monks founded by St Aed mac Bricc of Killare	Kilbrenan; Enach-mid-brenin
Templefaughtna ^{ø~}		purported Knights Hospitaller — ruins of an old establishment (Note: John Cooke, Handbook for Travellers in Ireland, 1910, p.447)	
Timoleague Friary		Franciscan Friars founded 1240 by McCarthy Riabach or L William James Barry or c.1307-16 by Margery de Courci, wife of William Barry; built on the site of an earlier monastery; transferred from Cregan 1279; Observant Franciscan Friars reformed 1460; dissolved 1542, Friars in occupancy 1626 and 1641 dissolved; passed to Lord Inchiquin; (NM)	Timoleague Abbey; Tech-molaiga; Tech-molagga; Temolagi; Thatmelage; Thimolagi
Toames Monastery		Gaelic monks	Tuaim-muscraighe Monastery?
Tracton Abbey		Cistercian monks — from Whitland built 1224 by McCarthy; 1225, Cistercian chapter general approved petition from Odo de Barru 1222 and 1223 to found abbey; colonized 22 February 1225; suppressed 1540-1, though monks possibly remained; dissolved after 1541; granted to James Craig and Henry (Gylford (Guilford) 1568; Elizabeth I directed Henry Gylford to have 60-year lease 1568; assigned by Craig to the Earl of Cork	Albus tractus; Traghton
Tulach-min-Molaga ^{~}		early monastic site, founded 7th century by St Molagga of Timoleague and ann Beachaire, possibly located near Mitchelstown or Fermoy, probably Labbamolaga (supra)	?Labbamolaga
Tullylease Abbey		early monastic site, founded by St Berechert, an Anglo-Saxon; Augustinian Canons Regular founded before 1170?, built by Mathew, son of Griffin; cell dependent on Kells Ossory after 1193; dissolved (?)	Tulach-leis; Tealach-leas; Tealach-lias; Tulales; Tullelash; Tollelyche; Tolleleyleyse
Weeme Priory		Augustinian Canons Regular extant 14th century	
Youghal — Carmelite Friary		post-Reformation foundation purportedly established in the ruins of an earlier Carmelite 'abbey' (Note: no name similar to Youghal listed either in Fonds Grand Carmes or Arch. Ord. Rome (Carmelite Order), Manuscripts. II, C.O. II. 26, p.13, written 1739-59)	
Youghal — Dominican Friary (North Abbey)		Dominican Friars founded 1268 (1271 (Note: Clyn)) by Thomas fitz Maurice; built 1268 by Maurice, descendant of Lord Offaly; Regular Observant Dominican Friars reformed 1493; dissolved c.1543; granted in perpetuity to William Walshe c.1580; friars probably expelled 1583; granted to John Thickpenny, a soldier, 1584; granted, in the occupation of Thickpenny's widow, to Sir Walter Raleigh, 1587, whereupon the buildings were destroyed, the friars remaining in or near the town	Holy Cross Priory; Our Lady of Graces Priory; ____________________; Eochaille; Araill; Iochil; Yoghill; Youghuld
Youghal — Franciscan Friary (South Abbey)		Franciscan Friars built 1224 by Maurice Fitzgerald, Lord Chief Justice of Ireland; Observant Franciscan Friars reformed 1460; dissolved 1541-2: church and cloister demolished, convent withdrew to Curraheen, County Waterford; friars apparently returned soon afterwards, with Coraheen retained for use as a refuge in emergency; dissolved 1583, friars expelled or killed and buildings destroyed by English Protestants; abandoned until another house established 1627 (see immediately below)	
Youghal — Franciscan Friary, later site		Franciscan Friars founded 1627 in succession to site abandoned (see immediately above)	
Youghal Priory		Benedictine monks cell, hospital or Maison Dieu, dependent on Waterford and Bath; founded 1185 before 1306; dissolved 1536?	St John's House
Youghal Nunnery		assumed to have been Franciscan? nuns, possibly St Clare (Franciscan Second Order); convent possibly founded during the reign of Henry II; priory founded before 1385; dissolved 1542 St Anne	
Youghill in Munster Friary		Augustinian Friars possibly founded c.1643	Youghal

Return to top of page

==== County Donegal ====
(For references and location detail see List of monastic houses in County Donegal)

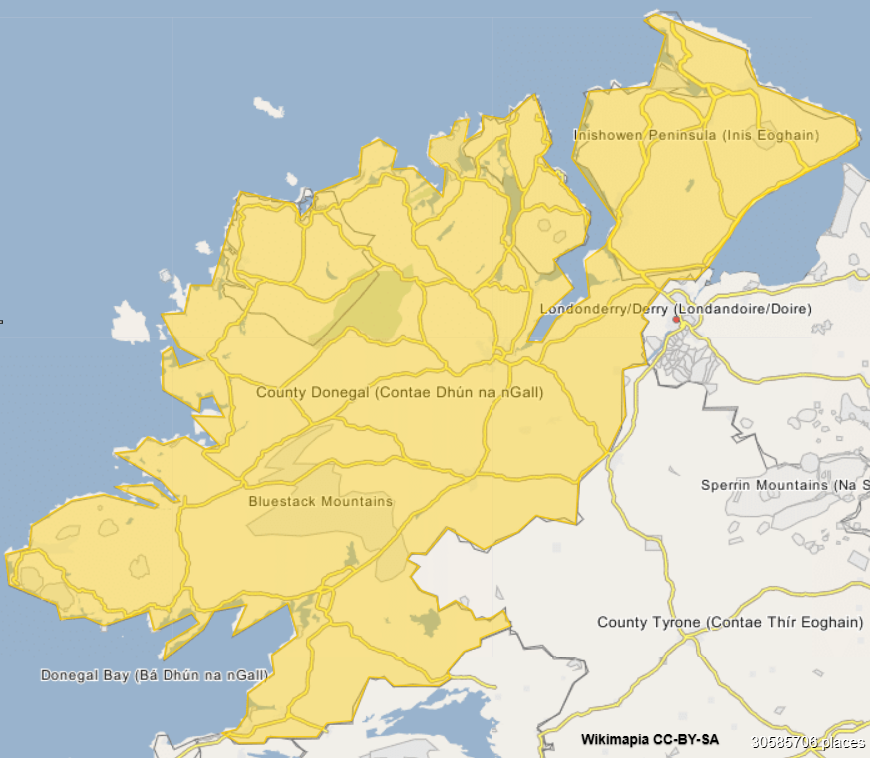
Locations of monastic houses in County Donegal

Foundation	Image	Communities & Provenance	Formal Name or Dedication & Alternative Names
Ard Mhuire Friary ^{*}		Capuchin Franciscan Friars	
Assaroe Abbey		Cistercian monks — from Boyle daughter house of Boyle founded 1178 by Roderick O'Cananan, Prince of Tyrconnell or Flaharty; colonized 1179 or 1184; dedicated 1184 by Flaharty O'Muldorry; burnt 1377; plundered by Niall Óg O'Neill, King of Tyrone 1398; dissolved after 1597; granted to Anthony Fyrres 1586	God and St Bernard ____________________ Astrath; Ashroe; Ashrath; Eas-Roe; Es-aeda-ruaid; Inis-Samer; Samaria; Esarua
Aughnish Monastery		early monastic site, probably not continuing into 11th century; erenaghs until 16th century	Each-inis; Tullyaughnish
Balleeghan Friary		Franciscan Friars, Third Order Regular founded c.1471; dissolved 1603; granted to James Fullerton 1603	Baile-Aighedh-Chaoin; Baile-Fhindhetain; Ballagha
Ballymacswiney Friary		Franciscan Friars, Third Order Regular founded 1646 or 1469 by MacSwiney; dissolved before 1607; sold to Sir Ralph Bingley by Henry Perse,1612	Baile-mic-suibhne; Bailli-macquinadoe; Mukish, nr. Castle Doe
Ballymagrorty Monastery (Drumhome parish)		early monastic site, founded 6th century by St Colmcille	Ballymagroarty
Ballysaggart Friary		Franciscan Friars, Third Order Regular founded c.1500(?) by the Mac-Ruini-Faigs (Mac Swiney Banagh?); dissolved c.1602	Baile-na-sagart; Fan-an-chartha; Fanegarah; Fanogher; Fanegarah
Bochiminon Friary ^{~≈?}		Carmelite Friars, possibly located in County Donegal, possibly Rathmullen	possibly Rathmullan
Bothchonais Monastery		early monastic site, Gaelic monks, purportedly founded by Chonas, second husband of Darerca, sister of St Patrick; continuing 11th century	Boithe-conais
Carrickmore Monastery		early monastic site coarbs until 16th century	Carraic; Cairrge
Carrowmore Monastery		early monastic site	
Clonca Monastery		early monastic site, Gaelic monks erenaghs until early 17th century	
Clondahorkey Monastery		early monastic site; erenagh land 16th-17th century	
Clonenagh Monastery		early monastic site, founded 6th century by St Colmcille	Cluain-enach in Inishowen
Clonfert-mulloe Monastery		early monastic site, founded before 605; dissolved after 925	Cluain-ferta-molua; Kyle
Cluain-imurchir		early monastic site, in existence in the time of St Abban	Cluain-nimurchir; Cluain-immorchair
Clonleigh Monastery		early monastic site, Gaelic monks founded c.530 by St Colmcille; erenaghs until 16th-17th century	Cluain-laegh; Cluain-laig;Cluain-laodb; Croaghan-laodb; Cruachan-ligean; Druim-lighean; Drumleene
Clonmany Monastery		early monastic site, Gaelic monks founded 6th century by St Colmcille; probably continuing after 1111	Culmaine; Cluain-maine
Conwal Monastery		Gaelic monks founded in early 7th century; erenaghs until early 17th century	Conwall Monastery
Cnodain Monastery		early monastic site (Note: mentioned by Wm Cobbett)	
Culdaff Monastery		early monastic site; erenaghs to 16th-17th century	Culdabhach; Coldoch; Cooledagh
Desertegny Monastery		early monastic site, Gaelic monks founded 6th century by St Colmcille; erenaghs until after 1397	Disert-eignigh
Domnach-mor-magene Monastery		early monastic site, Gaelic monks founded 5th century by St Patrick	Domnachmormagene; Domnach-mor-Mag-ene
Donagh Monastery		early monastic site, Gaelic monks founded 5th century by St Patrick	Carndonagh; Domnach-mor-maig-tochair; Domnach-mor-maig-glinne; Domnach-morglinnetochair; Domnachglinne Tochair; Domnachglinne Tochuir
Donaghmore Monastery		early monastic site, Gaelic monks founded 5th century by St Patrick for Dubudae; possibly continuing after 1111; desolated by 1179; erenagh lands until 1609	Domnach-mor-maige-itha; Donagmore
Donegal Friary		Observant Franciscan Friars founded 1474 (or 1473) by Aodh Rua (Hugh Rufus) O'Donnell, chief of Tirconnell, and his mother, Nuala O'Connor; plundered and garrisoned by the English 1588; English driven away by Red Hugh 1592; repaired and re-occupied by 1600; abandoned 1601; dissolved 1601; 17th century place of refuge at Lough Eske; removed to Rossnowlagh (extant); (NM)	'Donegal Abbey' ; Donegall; Duin-na-gall; Dunangall; Dungallen
Drumhome Monastery		early monastic site, Gaelic monks possibly continuing after 1111; erenaghs at least until c.1609	Druim-thuoma; Druim-tuama; Drimholm; Mullanacross
Eskaheen Monastery		early monastic site	Iskaheen; Uisce-chaoin; Uskechaoin
Fahan Monastery		Gaelic monks founded 6th century by St Colmcille; possibly continuing after 10th century; C.I. parochial church built on site 17th century, now ruined	Fathen-mura; Athan-mura; Fothenmor;Othain-mor; Faynwor; Upper Fahan
Gartan-Rath Monastery		early monastic site, Gaelic monks founded 521 by St Colmcille	Garton; Gartan; Gortan
Glencolumbkille Monastery		early monastic site, Gaelic monks founded 6th century by St Colmcille; church on site demolished 1828; C.I. parochial church built on site	Glenn-choluim-chille; Seinglean; Senglend
Grellagh Monastery		early monastic site	Greallach; Templemoyle
Inishkeel Monastery		early monastic site, Gaelic monks founded before c.580	Inis Keel; Inis-caoil; Inis-coel
Inis Saimer Monastery ^{~}		purported monastic site, location given as island off St John's Point (Note: Mervyn Archdall, Monasticon Hibernicum, 1786, p.100) — island does not exist; identified as Assaroe (Note: L. A. Alemande, Monasticum Hibernicum, translated and edited by J. Stevens, 1722, p.204) q.v.	Ines Samer; cf Assaroe
Inver Monastery		early monastic site, Gaelic monks founded 6th century by St Náile of Kinawley; in parochial use until 1807	Inber-naile
Inver Friary ^{ø}		purported Franciscan Friars, Third Order Regular (Note: Mervyn Archdall, Monasticon Hibernicum, 1786, p.100, citing J. Ware, De Hibernia, et Antiquitatibus, ejus, 1754 edition, however that source lists only Inver in County Antrim as Franciscan)	
Kilbarron Monastery		early monastic site, Gaelic monks founded 6th century by St Colmcille; erenaghs until early 17th century	Cell-barrainne; Kilvanny
Kilcar Monastery		early monastic site, Gaelic monks founded 6th century by St. Carthach	Kilcartaich; Cell-charthaigh; Killen
Killaghtee Monastery		early monastic site, ruins of three churches; erenagh land until 1609	Cell-aedh-leacht
Killybegs Friary		Franciscan Friars, Third Order Regular founded c.1535–1540 by MacSwiny Bannagh; dissolved c.1600; Observant Franciscan Friars place of refuge c.1641; church in C.I. parochial use until 1829	St. Catherine ____________________; Cell-beaga;Calebeg; Colebeg; Callobegg-Boylaugh; Kilbeg
Killybegs Monastery		early monastic site; erenaghs until 1609	
Killydonnell Friary		Franciscan Friars, Third Order Regular founded 1471 by Calvagh O'Donnell, on grant of petition to the Pope by Franciscan brothers Dermit Idurnyn and Dermit Magillacsbuig; dissolved c.1603; granted to Captain Basil Brooke	Cell Ua dTomhrair; Cell-ua-dtomhrair; Kill-odtonaire; Kill-O-Donel
Kilmacrenan Friary		Franciscan Friars, Third Order Regular founded c.1537 by Manus O'Donnell on an early monastic site (see immediately below); dissolved 1603	Doire Eithne; Cell-mic-Nenain; Cell-mac-n-enain; Cell-mic-creunain; Kilmictrenain
Kilmacrenan Monastery		early monastic site, Gaelic monks possibly continuing after 1111; site of Franciscan friary (see immediately above)	Doire Eithne; Cell-mic-Nenain; Cell-mac-n-enain; Cell-mic-creunain; Kilmictrenain
Kilmonaster Monastery		Cistercian monks founded c.1194 by E. O'Dogharty of Tirconnel; dissolved before 1228: united to Assaroe presumably before 1228; grange	Kilfothuir; Hilfothuir; Kill-Fothuir; Cillifori; Kyfeire
Leck Monastery		early monastic site; erenaghs until 1609 (Note: J. B. Leslie, Raphoe Clergy and Parishes, 1940, p.103)	Lackovenan; Leac; Liacc
Lough Derg Friary — Saints Island		Augustinian Canons Regular founded on Station Island (see immediately below) c.1130; Franciscan Friars founded before 1631	
Lough Derg Priory — Station Island (see St Patrick's Purgatory)		early monastic site, Gaelic monks founded 5th century by St Patrick or St Dabeoc in the time of St Patrick; Augustinian Canons Regular dependent on Armagh, probably by St Malachy; founded c.1130 (after 1134); Augustinian Canons Regular — Arroasian; adopted after 1140; plundered 1196 by an O'Cairin; destroyed 1207 by Bratachas O'Boyle and M'Mahon; transferred to Saints Island; dissolved after 1600?	St Debeog; St Patrick ____________________; Finnloch; Termon Dabeoc
Lough Derg Monastery — Station Island		Franciscan Friars founded 1763; dissolved 1781, passed to the clergy of the Diocese of Clogher	
Lough Eske		Franciscan Friars Minor, Conventual, place of refuge 17th century from Donegal	
Magherabeg Friary		Franciscan Friars, Third Order Regular founded after/c.1430 by Niall Garbh (Note: Coll. de Rebus Hibernicis, BM, Add. MS. 4814, Sloane, f. 4) O'Donnell; (Note: J. Ware, De Hibernia, et Antiquitatibus, 1654 edition, p.186) dissolved 1601	An-macaire-beg; Macairebeg; Magherybeg
Malin Monastery ^{ø}		ancient church, purportedly monastic (Note: Mevyn Archdall, Monasticon Hibernicum, 1786, p.103)	Mala
Mevagh Monastery		early monastic site, Gaelic monks; erenaghs to 1609; remains of church and cross	Midhbheach; Midbech
Moville Monastery		early monastic site, Gaelic monks	Domnachbile; Magbile; Norborgh
Moyra Monastery, Ray		site occupied by remains of a 16th-century church	
Mukish Monastery ^{ø}		purported monastic site - probably Ballymacswiney, q.v.	Muckish
Racoon Monastery, nr. Ballintra		early monastic site, Patrician monks founded c.440	Raithcungi; Raghcunga
Raphoe Monastery		early monastic site, Gaelic monks founded 6th century by St Colmcille; possibly continuing after 1111; episcopal diocesan cathedral built on site	Raith-both
Rashenny Monastery, in Inishowen	purported early monastic site — confusion with Rath-eanich (Raymoghy, q.v.)		
Rashenny Monastery, nr Killybegs Harbour	purported early monastic site — confusion with Rathen, County Mayo (Note: given as County Donegal by Mervyn Archdall, Monasticon Hibernicum, 1786, p.104)		
Rathmullan Priory		Carmelite Friars possibly founded 1403 and subsequently failed, or (refounded?) 1516 by Owen Roe MacSweeney (Mac Suine Fanagh); plundered by Bingham 1595; dissolved; granted to Sir James Fullerton; assigned to Sir Ralph Bingley; rebuilt as a fortified house by Andrew Knox, Bishop of Raphoe, who had obtained the manor from Turlogh Oge Mac Sweeney; convent in existence c.1737	St Mary ____________________; Rath-maonlain; Rath-mullin; Bath-Mullian; Bochminon?
Raymoghy Monastery		Gaelic monks possibly not continuing after 10th century	
Rossnowlagh Friary ^{*}		Franciscan friars founded 1946; church and friary opened 1952; extant	
Slieve League Monastery		early monastic site, hermitage associated with St Aedh mac Bricc and St Assicus; erenagh until at least 1609	Sliab-liac
Taughboyne Monastery		early monastic site, Gaelic monks founded before 635/6 by St Fintan Munna	Tech-baithin
Temple Douglas			
Templecrone Monastery		early monastic site; erenaghs until at least 1609	Tempall-croine
Temple Douglas Monastery		early monastic site, purportedly founded 6th century by St Colmcille at church of St Cruithnechan, where he was baptised	Tempall-dubglaise
Toghernegomarkie Monastery		early monastic site; erenagh lands until at least 1609	Tochar-negomarkie; Ballybogan
Tory Island Abbey ^{#?}		early monastic site, Columban monks traditionally founded 6th century by St Colmcille; probably used as a refuge by religious orders during the reign of Elizabeth I; ruined and plundered by George Bingham 1595 (NM)	Torach; Toraidhe; Torre
Tullaghobegley Monastery		early monastic site, founded by an O'Begley; erenaghs until 1609	Tulach-an-bigli
Tullyfern Monastery		early monastic site; erenaghs until 1609	Tulach-fionn

Return to top of page

==== County Dublin ====
(For references and location detail see List of monastic houses in County Dublin)

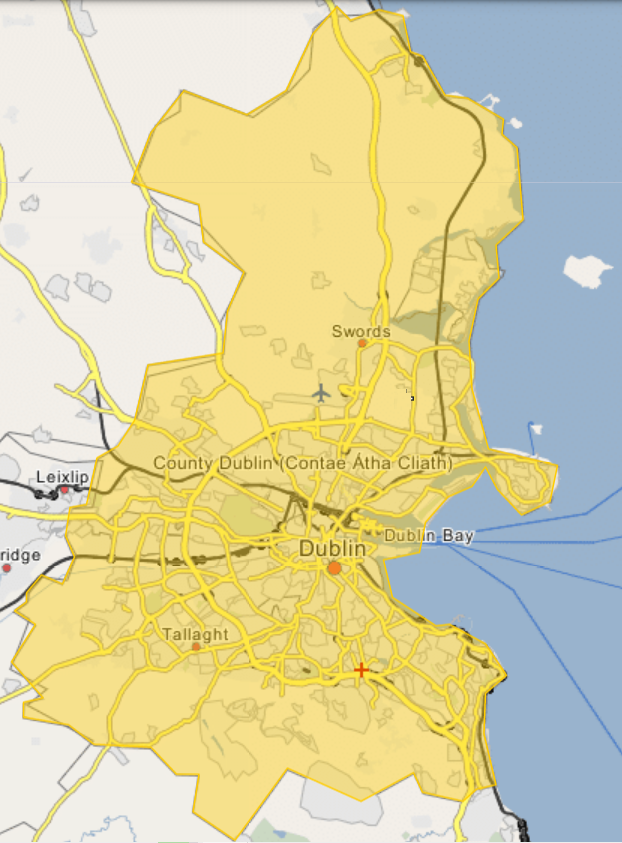
Locations of monastic houses in County Dublin
Locations of monastic houses in Central Dublin

Foundation	Image	Communities & Provenance	Formal Name or Dedication & Alternative Names
Balally Monastery ^{~}		supposed Early Christian monastic site (Irish: Baile Amhlaoibh, meaning 'the town of Olaf') may commemorate a Viking saint	
Baldongan Monastery		supposed monastic site of friary & nunnery within the walls of the 13th-century Baldongan Castle - order and period unknown; traditionally Knights Templar preceptory	Baldungan
Ballyboghill Monastery		early monastic site, Gaelic monks prior to the arrival of the Anglo-Normans	Ballyboughal
Ballymadun Monastery ^{ø}		supposed monastic site — order and period doubtful; purported Augustinian Canons Regular cell	Ballymad with Balrothery
Ballyman Monastery ^{ø}		supposed Knights Templar site Glanmonder; Glenmunder	
Castleknock Priory		Benedictine monks dependent on Little Malvern; founded c.1185 by Hugh Tyrrell, Lord of Castleknock; erroneously also given as Augustinian (Note: Harris's Table in Ware-Harris, Antiquitie, 1745 and Mervyn Archdall, Monasticon Hibernicum, 1786) dissolved before 1485	St Brigid ____________________; Caislen-cnoc; Caislen-Cnucha
Clondalkin Abbey		early monastic site, Gaelic monks, traditionally founded by St Cronan (Mo-Chua); plundered by the Danes, 833; burned 1071; granted to the Culdees in perpetuity; possibly continuing after 1111	Cluain-dolcain; Dun Awley
Clontarf Monastery		early monastic site, Gaelic monks church founded 550 by St Comgall of Bangor; site now occupied by the remains of St John the Baptist's C.I. parish church	Cluain-tarbh
Clontarf Preceptory ^{#^}		Knights Templar founded before 1180, granted by Henry II; dissolved 1308-10; Knights Hospitaller refounded 1313 (after 1314); dissolved after 1400; granted to Prior Rawson of Kilmainham; Clontarf Castle built on site, now the Clontarf Castle Hotel	St Congal
Cruagh Monastery		early monastic site, Gaelic monks founded 5th century by D. Daluan of Croibige in the time of St Patrick	Craibeach; Creevagh
Dalkey Island		Benedictine monks chapel	St Begnet ____________________; Deilginis-cualan
Dublin — All Saints' Priory		Augustinian Canons Regular — Arroasian founded c.1166, Canons installed by Dermot Mac Murrough, King of Leinster; dissolved 1539; granted to Lord Devlin 1565; College of the Holy Trinity built on site by Queen Elizabeth I	
Dublin — Holy Trinity Cathedral and Priory ^{+}		traditional early monastic site, founded 7th century?; church founded c.1030; apparently Benedictine monks before 1085 to 1096; episcopal diocesan cathedral 1152; Augustinian Canons Regular — Arroasian founded c.1163; dissolved 1541; continuing as secular cathedral by Queen Mary	
Dublin — St George's Monastery ^{≈}		purported monastery of St George mentioned 1199, (Note: Calendar of Documents relating to Ireland, edited by H. S. Sweetman and G. F. Handcock, 1875-86) doubtless a reference to St Mary de Hogges, which is located in the parish of St George	St George
Dublin — St Mary's Abbey		Savignac monks — from Chester founded c.1139; Cistercian monks orders merged 1147-8; apparently dependent on Combermere 1147; apparently dependent on Buildwas 1156-7; attempt to break with Buildwas failed 1307; dissolved 28 October 1539, surrendered by the last abbot, William Laundie; occupied for munitions by John Travers by 1540; granted to James, Earl of Desmond 20 December 1543; (NM)	St Mary ____________________; Baile-atha-cliath; Ath-cliath; Duibhlinne
Dublin — St Mary de Hogges Abbey		Augustinian nuns — Arroaisian dependent on Clonard; founded c.1146 by Dermot Mac Murrough, King of Leinster; independent from before 1195; dissolved 1536, apparently suppressed early 1536; demolished by William Brabazon, under-treasurer of Ireland, materials used in repair of the King's castle in Dublin; granted to Francis Gosby 26 December 1537; granted to James Sedgrave c.1542	St Mary de Hogges
Dublin — St. Mary del Dam		purported nunnery; (Note: Mervyn Archdall, Monasticon Hibernicum, 1786, p.173) parish church occupied by a woman recluse 1276-7 (Note: Calendar of Documents relating to Ireland, edited by H. S. Sweetman and G. F. Handcock, 1875-86)	
Dublin — St Saviour's Priory *		Dominican Friars; church opened 15 January 1861; priory added 1885; Studium - House of Studies since 2000. extant	
Dublin — St Thomas's Abbey		Augustinian Canons Regular priory founded March 1177 by King Henry II; Augustinian Canons Regular — Victorine raised to abbey status c.1192; dissolved 1539; granted to William Brabazon 1545	The Abbey Church of Saint Thomas the Martyr, Dublin ____________________; Thomas Court
Dublin Augustinian Friary of the Most Holy Trinity		Augustinian Friars founded c.1259; Observant adopted 1517; dissolved 1540; granted to Robert Casey 6 May 1541	Holy Trinity
Dublin Augustinian Priory (at the (East) Gate of Dublin)		purported Augustinian Canons Regular (Note: Louis Augustin Alemand, Monasticum Hibernicum, translated and edited by John Stevens, 1722, p.6, however, identical to St Catherine's Priory, which he lists on p.123)	
Dublin Augustinian Priory, St Olave		Augustinian Canons Regular church belonging to Bristol	
Dublin Carmelite Friary *		Carmelite Friars founded 1274 by Sir Robert Bagot, Chief Justice; dissolved 3 August 1539, surrendered by the last prior William Kelly; granted to Nicholas Stanyhurst; demolished before 18 August 1541; granted to Francis Aungier by Elizabeth I modern Carmelite priory built on site, extant	St Mary
Dublin Priory Hospital		Fratres Cruciferi and nuns founded before 15 November 1588 (1185-8) by Ailred the Palmer; dissolved 1539; granted to Maurice, Earl of Thomond, 1544	St John Baptist ____________________; Palmer's Hospital
Dublin Dominican Friary		Dominican Friars founded 1224; destroyed by fire in Dublin 1304; rebuilt before 1308 by Eustace le Poer; dissolved 1539; granted to Sir Thomas Cusack 1542; granted to the Earl of Ormond 1578; The King's Inns established on site c.1582;	St Saviour
Dublin Dominican Friary, later site		Dominican Friars founded c.1622	
Dublin Franciscan Friary *		Franciscan Friars Minor, Conventual founded before 13 January 1233 (possibly on an earlier site); possibly transferred here c.1236; Observant Franciscan Friars adopted 1521; dissolved 1540; granted to Thomas Stephens 1541	
Dublin Franciscan Friary *		Franciscan Friars Minor, Conventual extant	Adam and Eve's
Dublin Knights Hospitallers		Knights Hospitaller frankhouse of Kilmainham, founded before 1290; continued until the suppression	
Dublin Sack Friars		Friars of the Sack probably founded 1268; dissolved after 1309-10	
Finglas Monastery		early monastic site, Gaelic monks founded 560 by St Canice; possibly not continuing after 10th century (last recorded abbot died in Rome 1038); site occupied by remains of a medieval church	Fin-ghlais; Fionn-ghlais; Fionn-glass
Firhouse Carmelite Monastery *		Carmelite nuns extant	
Glasmore Monastery		early monastic site, Gaelic monks founded by St Cronan (Mochua)	Glaismor; Moortown
Glasnevin Monastery		early monastic site, Gaelic monks founded before 545 by St Mobi; possibly not continuing after 10th century	Glas-naoidhen; Glais-noiden
Grace Dieu Abbey, nr. Donabate		Augustinian nuns — Arroaisian — from Lusk; (community founded at Lusk after 1144) transferred here c.1195; founded after 1195? by John Cumin, Archbishop of Dublin; dissolved 1539; Turvey House was built from the remains of the abbey	St Mary ____________________ de Gratia Dei; Turvey House
Grange Abbey		chapel of All Saints' Priory; disused since 17th century; ruined; (NM)	
Holmpatrick Priory, Skerries		Augustinian Canons Regular — from St Patrick's Island founded 1220; dissolved 1557; granted to Thomas FitzWilliams 1578; site now occupied by C.I. church	Holm Patric; Inis-patraic; Skerries
Howth 'Abbey' ^{ø}		non-monastic collegiate church	The Collegiate Church of St. Mary Howth
Ireland's Eye Monastery		early monastic site; besieged 897; plundered 960	
Killester Monastery		purported remains of a monastery in Killester House (Note: Gazetteer of Great Britain and Ireland, iii, p.447)	
Killiney Monastery		early monastic site, Gaelic nuns	
Killiney Friary *		Franciscan Friars founded 1945; extant	Dun Mhuire
Killininny Monastery		early monastic site, Gaelic nuns	Cell-na-n-ingen; Kilnaninghean
Kilmacud Carmelite Monastery *		Carmelite nuns founded 1881; extant	St Joseph
Kilmainham Monastery		early monastic site, founded 7th century by St Magnenn (Maignenn/Maighnenn) (in the time of St Fursey); later Knights Hospitaller site (see immediately below)	Cell-maignenn; Kil-maignend
Kilmainham Preceptory		Knights Hospitaller founded c.1174 by Richard Fitz Gilbert de Clare, Strongbow, Earl of Pembroke and Striguil, on the site of earlier monastery (see immediately above); erroneously given as Knights Templar ; (Note: Mervyn Archdall, Monasticon Hibernicum, 1768, p.221, and others) dissolved 1540; restored 1557; dissolved November 1558	Priory of St John the Baptist
Kilnamanagh Monastery		early monastic site	Cell-na-managh
Kilsallaghan Monastery		purported monastic site, order, foundation and period unknown	Kilsaghlan
Kinsaley Monastery ^{=?}		early monastic site, founded by St Garban (Gobban) or St Doulagh; St Doulagh C.I. parish church built on site	Cean-saile; Cenn-saile; Kinsealy
Lambay Island Monastery ^{#}		early monastic site, founded by St Colmcille	Reachrainn; Rechra; Lambey
Loreto Abbey ^{^}		Sisters of Loreto founded 1821 by Frances Ball at Rathfarnham House	
Loreto Abbey, Dalkey		Sisters of Loreto founded 1843 by Frances Ball; boarding school for girls opened 17 August 1843; boarding school closed 1982, continuing as a day school	
Lusk Abbey ^{=+}		early monastic site, founded before 496/8, possibly c.450, by Cuinnidh mac Cathmugh (St MacCullin), who died 496/8; burned and plundered by the Danes 827 and 856; burned and plundered by Munstermen 1053; burned by men of Meath 1133; St MacCullin's C.I. parish church built on site, incorporating round tower into tower	Lusca
'The Abbey', Malahide		ruins of a chapel	Alahid; Mullachide
Malahide Carmelite Monastery *		Carmelite nuns extant	Star of the Sea Carmelite Monastery
Newcastle Monastery		early monastic site, founded by a St Finnian	Caislean-nua-liamhain
Portrane Priory		Augustinian nuns — Arroasian — from Grace Dieu founded 1539; dissolved after 1577	
Rathmichael Monastery, Carrickgolligan Hill		early monastic site, enclosure with slight remains of church and round tower	
Red Island Monastery, Skerries			
Roebuck Carmelite Monastery *		Carmelite nunsSee Roebuck, Dublin	The Immaculate Conception
Saggart Monastery		early monastic site	Tech-sacra; Tassagard
St Anne's Monastery		early monastic site, possibly founded by Bishop Sanctain (possibly St Sanctain)	St Anne ____________________; Killeaspuigsanctain; St Anne's Chapel
St Catherine's Priory		Augustinian Canons Regular — Victorine founded 1219 by Warisius dePech; cell dependent on St Thomas's, Dublin, 1323; dissolved 1539, surrendered 25 June 1539	St Katherine; Salmon Leap
St Doolagh's Monastery		early monastic site, founded by St Doolagh? chapel and cell 1200 possibly built for a hermit or small community	St Doolagh ____________________; St Doilough; Clochar
St Patrick's Island Monastery		early monastic site, founded by St Patrick burned by the Danes 798; Augustinian Canons Regular founded after 1140; dissolved 1220, transferred to a new site at Holmpatrick	Inis Patraic
Santry Monastery		early monastic site, founded by 6th century	Sentrebh
Sruthair Monastery		early monastic site, possibly in County Dublin	Sruther
Swords Monastery ^{=}		early monastic site, founded c.560 by St Columbkill (Note: Mervyn Archdall, Monasticon Hibernicum, 1786 p.256)	Sord-coluim-cille; Suird
Swords Priory		nuns 1474 mention of a prioress here probably refer to Grace Dieu (Note: King's Collection manuscripts, compiled by Dr Madden, late 17th century, revised by Harris, National Library of Ireland and Trinity College Dublin, p.136 (Mervyn Archdall, Monasticon Hibernicum, 1786), but see Extents of Irish Monastic Possessions 1540-1, edited by Newport D. White (Irish MSS. Commission), 1943, p.75)	
Tallaght Monastery ^{#+}		early monastic site, founded 769 by Saint Maelruan; burned and plundered 811 by the Danes; rebuilt; possibly not continuing after 1125; site now occupied by St Maelruain's C.I. parish church	Tamlacht-maelruain; Taulaght
Tallaght, St. Mary's Priory *		Dominican Friars founded 1855; novitate; new wing added 1903 connecting church and tower; library block completed in 1958; Studium 1935-2000; The Priory Institute incorporated 2000 extant	St Mary
Taney Monastery		early monastic site	
Tullow/Tully Monastery?		early monastic site, founded by St Brigid (possibly Brigid, daughter of Leinin); ruined 13th-century church may occupy site of an Early Christian monastic site	Telach--na-n-epscop; Tulach-na-n-epscop; Irish: tulach na n-Epscop, meaning 'the hill of the bishops'

The following location in County Dublin lacks monastic connection:

- Rathfarnham Priory: sometime home of the Curran family

Return to top of page

==== County Galway ====
(For references and location detail see List of monastic houses in County Galway)

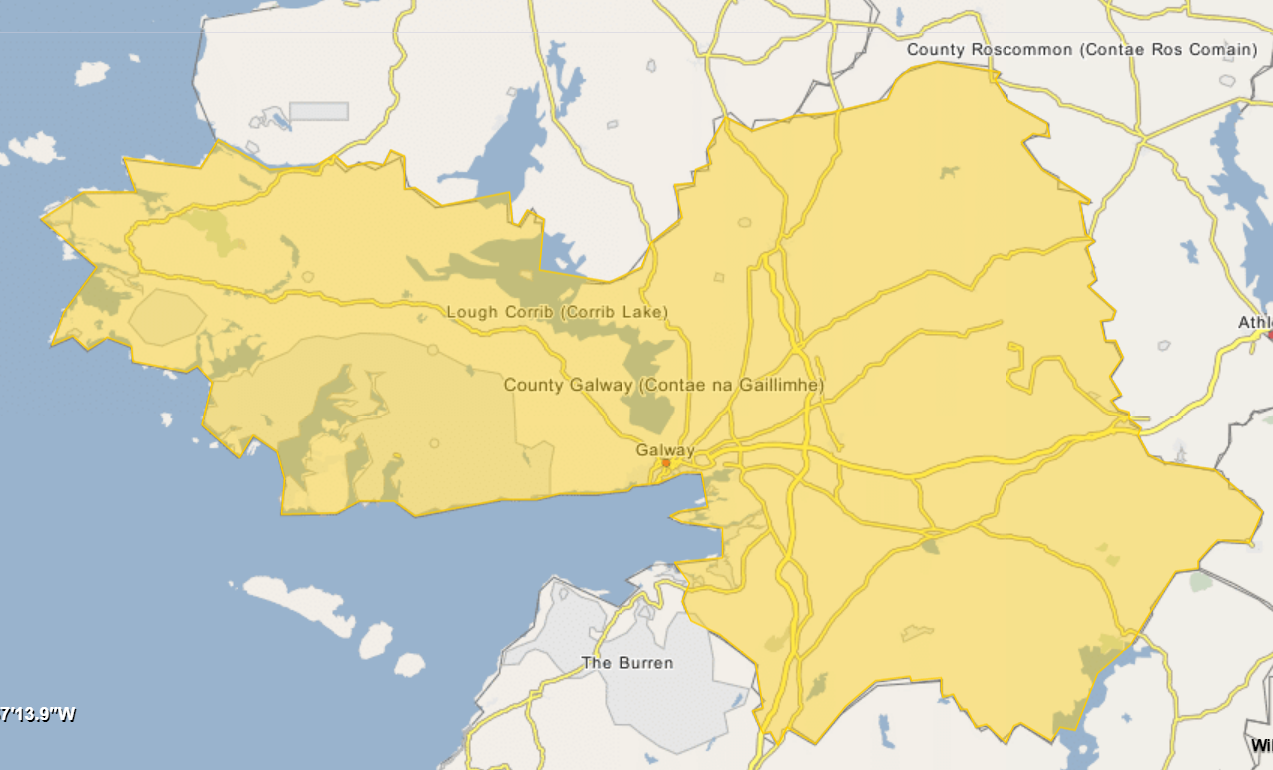
Locations of monastic houses in County Galway

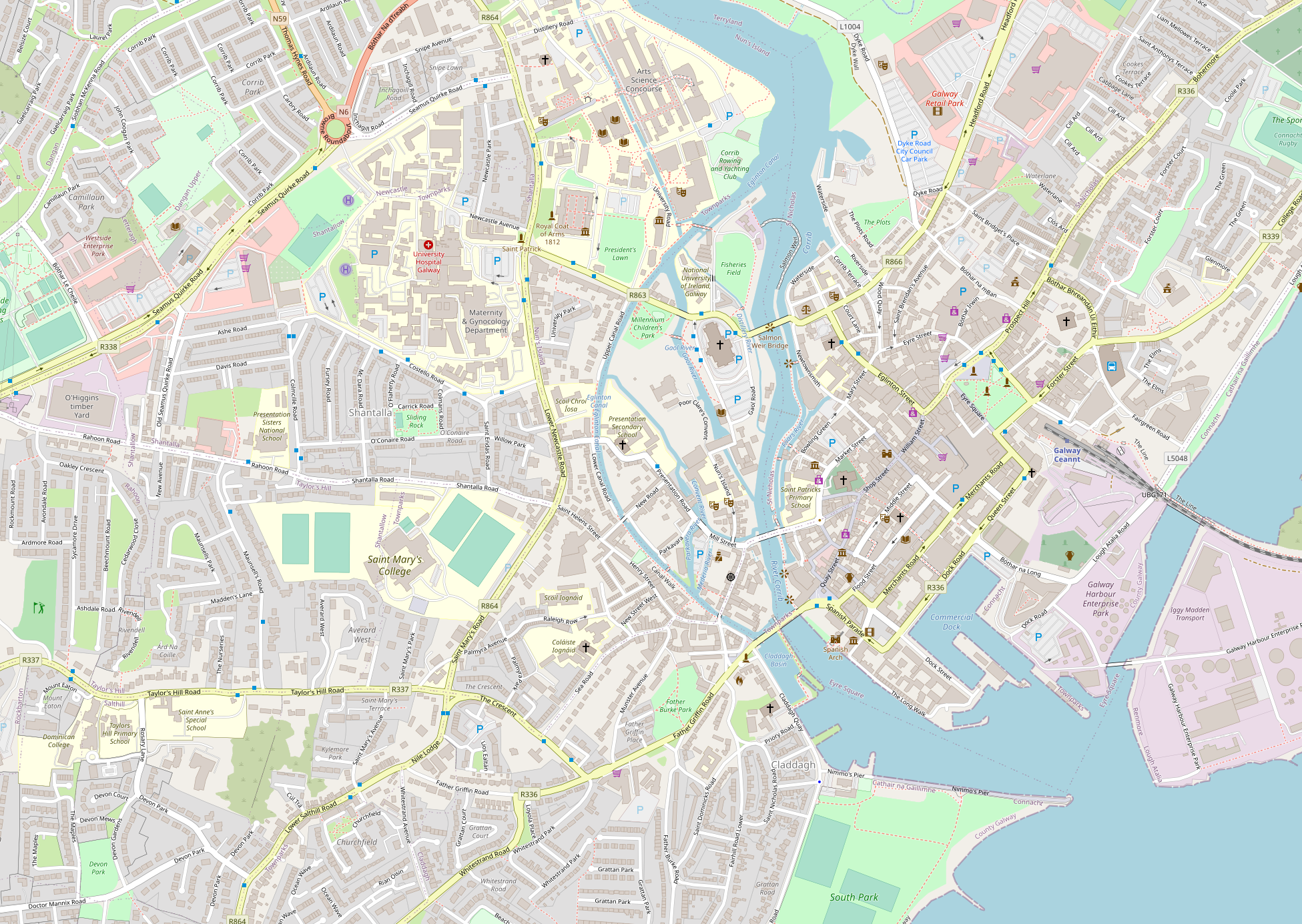
Locations of monastic houses in Galway
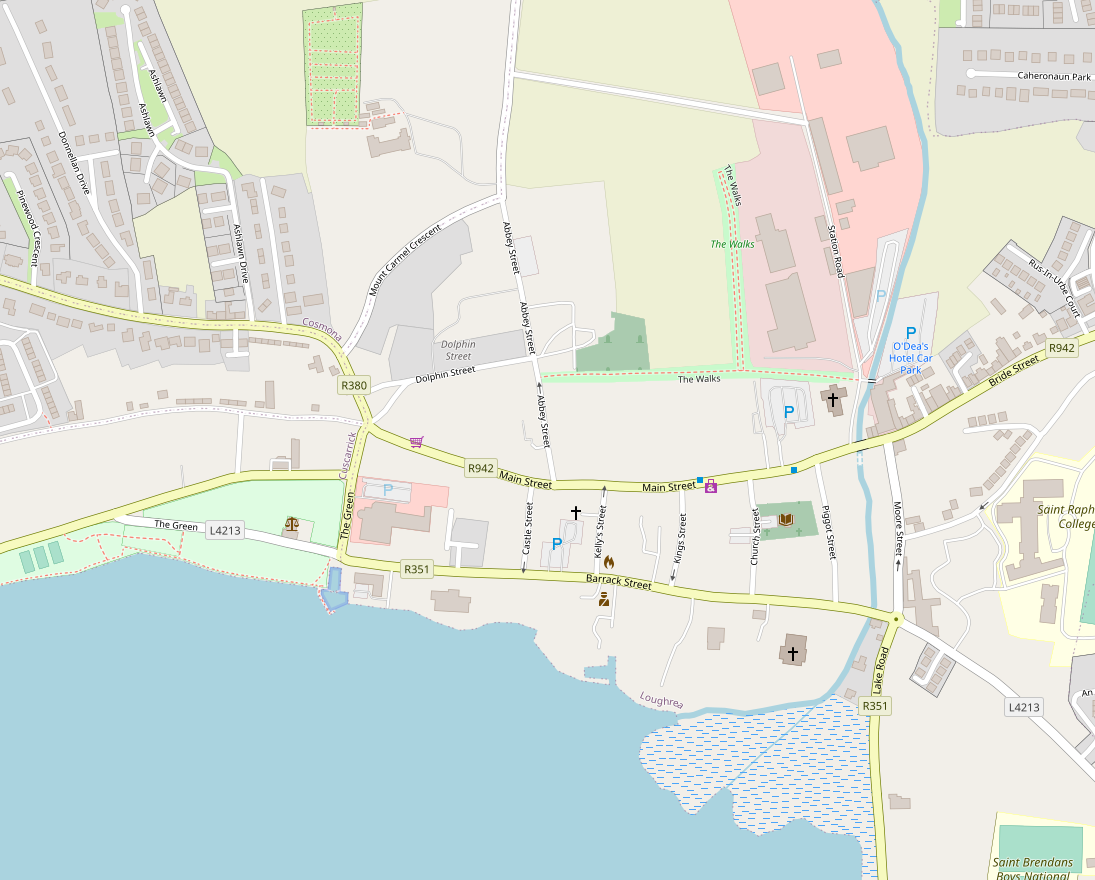
Locations of monastic houses in Loughrea
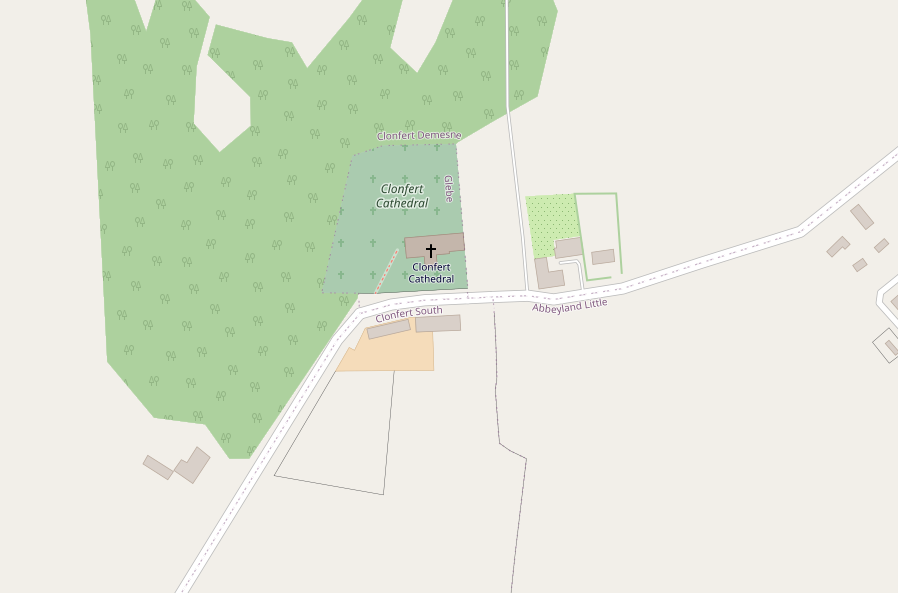
Locations of monastic houses in Clonfert
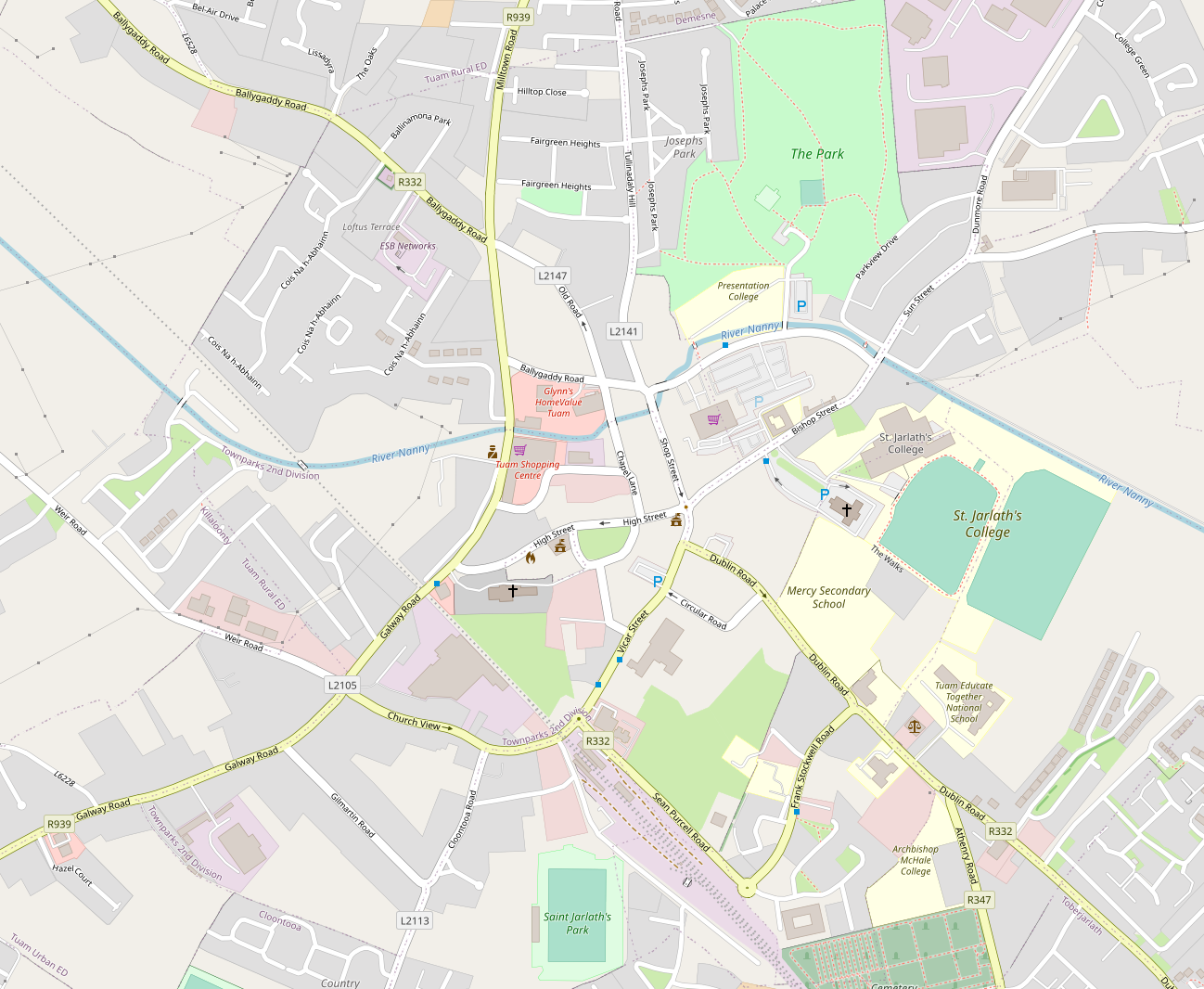
Locations of monastic houses in Tuam

Foundation	Image	Communities & Provenance	Formal Name or Dedication & Alternative Names
Abbeygormacan Abbey		Augustinian Canons Regular founded before 1170?; dissolved 1543; granted to Ulick Bourke (William Ulick de Burgo Mac William), first Earl of Clanrickard (Clanricarde) 1543/1544, who probably did not evict the canons, who possibly remained until the reign of Elizabeth I	The Abbey Church of the Blessed Virgin Mary, Gormacan ____________________; Gormacan Abbey; Abbey Gormogan Abbey; Monaster O Gormogan; de Via Nova; Nova Via
Addergoole Abbey (Addergoole parish, near Ardcloon)		order, period and foundation unknown "Abbey (in ruins)" (Note: Ordnance Survey)	
Ahascragh Abbey		early monastic site, reputedly founded by St Cuan; C.I. church on site	Ahaskeragh; Ath-ascrath; Ath-ascrach; Ath-escrach-Cuain
Annaghdown Abbey of St. John the Baptist		Premonstratensian Canons daughter house of Tuam; founded before 1224; raised to abbey status c.1236; dissolved after 1542?; apparently the abbey was the most northerly of the ruins (known as 'the Nunnery') at Annaghdown; dissolved 1562; granted to Richard, Earl of Clanricarde 1572; granted to the warden and vicars of King's College, Galway 8 July 1578	St John the Baptist de Cella Parva
Annaghdown Abbey of St Mary		Augustinian Canons and Canonesses Regular — Arroasian founded after c.1140, possibly by Turlough O'Conor at the instance of St Malachy; identification sometimes confused with the Premonstratensian foundation to the north; dissolved before 1578, granted to Richard, Earl of Clanricarde 1562	The Abbey of Saint Mary de Portu Patrum, Annaghdown
Annaghdown Cathedral & Nunnery		early monastic site, Gaelic nuns founded 6th (before 578) century by St Brendan for his sister Briga, site traditionally granted by the King of Connacht; Augustinian nuns — Arroaisian adopted after 1144; priory, dependent on Clonard; integrated into the Abbey of St Mary de Portu Patrum c.1144; episcopal diocesan cathedral before 1189 (and after 1152); church of St Mary Evachdun, cum villa Kelgel confirmed to the Arroaisians of Clonard 1195; dependent on Kilcreevannty from before 1223, church of St Mary Eanchduyn confirmed to the Arroasians of Kilcreevanty c.1123 and 1400; diocese united with Tuam 1327; canons and canonesses possibly shared the same church; dissolved after 1223-4, nuns possibly transferred to Inishmaine	Monastery of Lough Corrib; Annadown; Eanach-duine; Enaghcoin; Evachdun; Lough Corrib; Lough Orbsen
Annaghdown Friary	erroneously listed as Franciscan Friars (Note: Louis Augustin Alemand, Monasticum Hibernicum, translated and edited by John Stevens, 1722, pp.280, 234-5, mistakes Nenagh/Aonagh (Annagh/Enach) for Annaghdown, error replicated by others)		
Ardnabara Abbey in Killimordaly parish		possible monastic site — order, foundation and period unknown, "Ardnabara Abbey, in ruins" (Note: Ordnance Survey)	
Ardrahan Monastery		early monastic site; stump of round tower (Note: Lord Killanin & M. V. Duignan, Shell Guide to Ireland 1962, new edition 1967)	Ard-rathain
Athenry Priory		Dominican Friars founded 1241; dissolved 1574; granted to the town; reoccupied 1595; Regular Observant date unknown; dissolved c.1597, burned with the town during hostilities; friars granted a new site at Coilascail, infra; became a university 1644; site recovered by friars 1685, retained until the general exile 1698; used as a barracks 18th century; (NM)	The Priory Church of Saint Peter and Saint Paul ____________________; Ath-na-riogh; Ath-na-rig; Anry
Athenry Friary ^{≈}	erroneous reference to Franciscan Friars — mistaken identification of Adare Friary (Note: Wadding)		
Aughrim Priory		early monastic site, founded before 741; Augustinian Canons Regular - (?)Arroasian founded before 1170? or 1220, doubtfully purportedy by a Butler (Theobald Walter, first Butler of Ireland (Note: Harris's Table, in Ware-Harris, Antiquitie, 1745)), more likely by an O'Kelly, with a Butler as a later benefactor; burned 1307; dissolved c.1562?; granted to Richard, Earl of Clanricard; Augustinian Friars	St Catherine ____________________; Eachdruim; Acharym-Omane; Aghrim; Achdrum; Echraim; Enachdruim-Omane
Ballynahinch Friary		Carmelite Friars founded 1356 by O'Flaherty; dissolved during the reign of Elizabeth I; convent listed as re-established c.1737 (Note: Arch. Ord. Rome (Carmelite order), SM. II, C.O.. II. 26, p.13 (compiled 1739-59))	Baile-na-hinse; Ballinhinceh; Dalcaccense?
Ballynakill 'Abbey'		"Abbey", (Note: Ordnance Survey ½ inch;) "Ellomaine Graveyard" (Note: Ordnance Survey 6 inch;)	Ellomaine
Beagh Friary (Barony of Clare)		Franciscan Friars, Third Order Regular founded after 1441; dissolved before 1585; granted to John Newton	
Beagh Friary (Barony of Kiltartan) ^{≈}	Franciscan Friars, Third Order Regular — erroneous reference to the friary in the Barony of Clare (see immediately above)		
Boilean Clair	Franciscan Friars Minor, Conventual — actually Claregalway — erronesously identified as a separate foundation (Note: Louis Augustin Alemand, Monasticum Hibernicum, translated and edited by John Stevens, 1722, p.281 and Mervyn Archdall, Monasticon Hibernicum, 1786, p.277)		
Boley Friary		Dominican Friars — from Portumna apparently founded early 18th century	Boula; Buaile
Caheradreen Monastery		early monastic site	
Caltra Friary		Carmelite Friars founded not later than 1336 (c.1320) by the Berminghams, barons of Athenry; dissolved 1589; granted to John Rawson 1589; restored 1735 (c.1737); closed c.1775	Kaltragh-ne-Pallice; Caltragh Pallas; Caltranapallice; Caltra-ne-Pallas; Callarense; Kaltragh-; Keal-; Pallice; Paileeshe
Claregalway Friary		Franciscan Friars Minor, Conventual founded before c.1252 by John de Colgan I; (Note: not John de Colgan II as suggested by Ware and others) dissolved 1542; granted to Richard de Burgo 1570; friars remained Observant Franciscan Friars adopted 1567?; dissolved c.1589, friars expelled by Sir Richard Bingham, who converted the buildings into barracks; friars permitted use of part of the monastery until expelled again; friars attempted to restore monastery after 1641; chapel in use until 18th century; (NM)	Claregalway Abbey; Clair; Baile-an-chlair; Boilean-Clair; Clar-dun-dunul
Cloghmore Monastery		early monastic site, founded 6th century by St Colmcille	Cloch-mor, in Killannin parish
Clonfert Abbey		Augustinian Canons Regular — Arroasian founded after 1140, possibly by Turlogh O'Conor, at the instance of St Malachy; dissolved 1571	St Mary's de Porto Puro
Clonfert Monastery		Gaelic monks founded before 577 or 583 by St Brendan the Navigator; episcopal diocesan cathedral 1111	Cluain-ferta-brenaind; Cluain-ferden
Clonfert, Monygayun Abbey		Augustinian nuns — Arroasian founded after 1144; dependent on Kilcreevanty from before 1223; dissolved during the reign of Elizabeth I	St Mary
Clonkeenkerrill Friary		Franciscan Friars, Third Order Regular founded c.1435 by Thomas O'Kelly, Bishop of Clonfert, converting the church into a friary at the instance of David and John Mullkerrill; Franciscan Friars Minor, Conventual refounded 1453, papal permission obtained by David Mullkerrill	Cloonkeenkerrill; 'St. Kerrill's Abbey'
Clonkeenkerrill Monastery		early monastic site	Cluain-cain-cairill; Cluain-caoin-cairiolla; Cluacaen-Caeryll
Clontuskert Priory		early monastic site, founded c.805 (before 809), by St Boedan; Augustinian Canons Regular - Arroasian founded after 1140, probably by the O'Kelly family; dissolved 1562; Augustinian Friars possibly restored 1637; (NM)	The Priory Church of Saint Mary, Clontuskert ____________________; Clontuskert Abbey; The Old Abbey; Cluain-tuaiskirt-ua-maine; Clontuskert-Omanny
Cloonfush Monastery		early monastic site, founded early 6th century by St Jarlath	Cluain-fois
Cloonyvornoge Friary		Franciscan Friars, Third Order Regular founded after 1441; dissolved 1585-6?; granted to John Newton 1597	Clonnavarnoge; Cowlevernoge; Cowleneringe
Coilascail Priory		Dominican Friars founded on a site granted by Ulrick Burke, Earl of Clanricarde	
Creevaghbaun Friary		Carmelite Friars founded 1332 by a member of the de Burgos family; dissolved 1574; granted to Thomas Lewis 1574; restored c.1737	Crevaghbane; Crevebane; Craghbane; Brenaghbane; Kribaghbane
Currabeg Monastery		monastic site, order, foundation and period unknown	
Donaghpatrick Monastery		early monastic site, founded by St Patrick	Domnach-patraic; Magna Saeoli
Drumacoo Monastery		early monastic site	Druim-muccado; Droma-Mucada
Dunmore Monastery	misidentification of Donaghpatrick (Note: Mervyn Archdall, Monasticon Hibernicum, 1786, p.231 mistakenly states Dunmore Friary was located on the site of an early monastery)		
Dunmore Priory		early monastic site Augustinian Friars founded c.1423 (before 1425) by Walter Mor de Bermingham, 9th Baron Athenry; dissolved 1569, friars remained in occupancy; held by John Burke fitz Thomas 1574; friars left in 1645, taking refuge at Mayfield	Donmore Mac Oryshe; Downemore; Dominensis?
Eglish Friary		Carmelite friars founded 1393–1398; possibly abandoned during the reign of Elizabeth; possibly Franciscan Friars dissolved 1579	Monteceancohe; Sleushancough; Slewshancogh
Esker Friary		Dominican Friars — Regular Observance founded after 1622, site granted by Ulrick Burke, Earl of Clanricarde, at the request of the Provincial, Fr Ross Mageoghegan and other friars; it became St. Dominic's College used for formation of members of the order; friars left in the late 19th century, handing the convent over to the Diocese of Clonfert in 1893 who used it for a short time for clerical training.	Brosk; Coilascail
Esker Monastery		Redemptorists, obtained the monastery from the Diocese in 1901. It was announced the ordered were ceasing their mission in Esker in 2021.	
Fallig Friary ^{≈~}		Franciscan Friars - probable confusion for Killeigh (Fallig), County Offaly (Note: Mervyn Archdall, Monasticon Hibernicum, 1786, p.285 suggests Fallig (given as Observant Franciscans by Louis Augustin Alemand, Monasticum Hibernicum, translated and edited by John Stevens, 1722, p.289) is Faghy, County Galway)	Faghy; Fahy
Galway Augustinian Friary		Augustinian Friars founded 1500 by Margaret Athy, at the request of Richard Nagle; dissolved before 1578; leased to the town 1578; demolished 1652 in order to use the strategic position of the site	
Galway Augustinian Friary *, later site		Augustinian Friars; church opened 4 September 1859; extant	
Galway Carmelite Priory		Carmelite Friars founded c.1332? possibly by a member of the de Burgo family; dissolved after 1648	
Galway Dominican Nunnery, first site		Dominican nuns founded 1644 in Augustine Street; exiled by the Cromwellians 1652; returned in 1686 to a house in Kirwan's Lane (see below)	
Galway Dominican Nunnery, second site		Dominican nuns founded 1686 in Kirwan's Lane; expelled on a number of occasions 1691 convent, known as The Slate House, in use as barracks for British soldiers; fell into disrepair; destroyed by fire 1842	
Galway Dominican Nunnery *, current site		Dominican nuns founded March 1845 on Taylors Hill, country house known as 'Mount Eaton' or 'Seaview', previously owned by the Sloper family; extant	
Galway Franciscan Friary *		Franciscan Friars built 1660; rebuilt 1781; extant	
Galway Franciscan Nunnery		Franciscan nuns, (?)Third Order founded 1511, church of St Nicholas purportedly granted by Walter Lynch to his daughter; dissolved during the reign of Elizabeth I	St Nicholas; ____________________; The house of the poor nuns of St Francis
Galway Friary		Franciscan Friars Minor, Conventual founded 1296 by William de Burgo; Observant Franciscan Friars reformed 1460, and again before 1520; Conventuals and Observants apparently continued together, the latter in the minority; Conventuals attempted to evict Observants 1533 but were overruled; dissolved 1550; reoccupied during the reign of Queen Mary; leased to the mayor and townsmen c.1569, renewed 1578; community apparently extant until 1583 when the friars left and church burnt; returned 1612 and rebuilt the church; destroyed 1657; converted into a court house; current court house on site	
Galway Priory		possibly formerly a hospital administered by the Premonstratensians; Premonstratensian Canons daughter house of Tuam; founded 1235, church purportedly granted to Tuam by the O'Halleran family; dissolved before 1451: relegated to chapel; left empty for a significant period by 1480; Dominican Friars founded 1488, granted licence by Innocent III; dissolved 1570; granted to the town corporation; possibly a vicariate of Athenry, raised to priory status 1612; dissolved 1651	Blessed Virgin Mary extra Muros; St Mary on the Hill
Gortnabishaun Monastery, Kilconla parish		early monastic site	
Gorumna Island, Killanin parish		early monastic site, "abbey" (Note: Ordnance Survey)	Gailimh; Galvia; Ngaillim; Bun-Gaillmhs; Bongal
Grange		Cistercian monks grange of Boyle	Grainsearchmhaonmhai; Grange of Mowyny
High Island Monastery		early monastic site, founded before 665 by St Fechin	Ardoilen; Cellgradhaandomhain
Illaunmore Monastery	Historical county location. See County Clare		
Inchiquin Monastery		early monastic site, founded before 626 by St Brendan the Navigator	Inis-mac-ui-chuind; Insi-ui-chuinn; Inisquin
Inishark Monastery		early monastic site	Inisairc
Inishbofin Monastery		early monastic site, Gaelic monks founded 7th century by St Coleman supposed Benedictine monks — evidence lacking; suggested Augustinian Canons Regular during the reign of Henry VIII — evidence lacking	Inis-bofine; Bophin Island
Inisheer Monastery; Aran Islands		early monastic site	Ada-airthir; Ara-coemhain; Airdne-coimhain; Ardcoenmain?
Inishlackan Friary		purported Franciscan Friars (Note: Lord Killanin & M. V. Duignan, Shell Guide to Ireland, 1962 (1967 edition), p.414)	
Inishmaan Monastery; Aran Islands		early monastic site, two churches under the parish of St Enda, Inishmore	Inismedhon; Middle Island
Inishmicatreer Monastery		early monastic site; "Abbey in ruins" (Note: Ordnance Survey)	'Inishmicatreer Abbey' ; Inish-mictreer
Inishmore Monastery; Aran Islands		early monastic site, purportedly granted to St Enda, aided by St Ailbe of Emly, by Oengus, King of Munster; Franciscan Friars, Third Order Regular (Note: Analecta Hibernica (Irish Manuscript Commission) No.6, November 1934 (OFM), i, p.104) or First Order (Note: Analecta Hibernica (Irish Manuscript Commission) No.6, November 1934 (OFM), i, p.27) founded after 1484, founder unknown; (Note: Analecta Hibernica (Irish Manuscript Commission) No.6, November 1934 (OFM), ii, p.161) First Order possibly transferred to the Third Order after 1560; dissolved ? (during the reign of Elizabeth I?), abandoned during the religious persecution	Ara-na-naemh; Ara-Enda; Killenda; Na Seacht dTeampaill; (The Seven Churches)
Inishnee Monastery		early monastic site, founded before 768	Inis-eidnigh?
Kilbennan Monastery		early monastic site, Gaelic monks founded by St Benignus (Benen), a disciple of St Patrick	Cell-beneoin; Dun Lughaid
Kilboght Friary		Franciscan Friars, Third Order Regular founded before 1507 by Hugo de Wall; dissolved after 1564; granted to Richard, Earl of Clanricarde	Kil-bought; kil-bout
Kilcolgan Monastery, Kilmacduagh diocese		early monastic site, founded before c.580; erenagh until at least 1132; burned during war 1258	
Kilcolgan Monastery, Clonfert diocese?		early monastic site, founded 6th century by St Colmcille for Colgan (possibly same as immediately above)	Cell-colgain
Kilcommedan Monastery		early monastic site	Cell-comadan
Kilconla Monastery		early monastic site, founded reputedly by St Conlat	Cell-connla; Kilconly
Kilconnell Friary		Franciscan Friars founded 1414 (1353 or c.1353) by William O'Kelly, Lord of Ui Maine; dissolved 1541; on the site of an earlier monastery (see immediately below); (NM)	Cell-chonaill; Kilconail
Kilconnell Monastery		early monastic site, founded 6th century by St Conall	Cell-chonaill; Kilconail
Kilcoona Monastery		early monastic site, founded by St Colmcille, site granted by Tibrades, son of Prince Maelduin, built by St Cuanna (Cuannach)	Cellcuannathe; Kilcoonagh
Kilcorban Friary		Dominican Friars dependent on Athenry; founded 1446; dissolved during the reign of Elizabeth I(?); site now occupied by St Corban's Church	Kilcarbain
Kilcreevanty Abbey		Benedictine nuns founded c.1200, chapel granted by Thomas de Burgo; Augustinian nuns — Arroasian refounded 1223; dissolved 1543	The Holy Rosary; The Blessed Virgin of the Holy Rosary ____________________; Cell-craobhnat; Kil-creunata; Kil-crevet; Casta Silva; Chaste Wood
Kilcummin Monastery ^{~}		early monastic site, founded by St Coeman	Kill-choemain; Cell-coemain
Kilkilvery Monastery		early monastic site; erenaghs until at least 11th century; later passed to the Fratres Cruciferi of Castledermot	Cell-cillbile
Killamanagh Priory		early monastic site; Premonstratensian Canons daughter house of Annaghdown; founded 1260 by an abbot of St John de Cella Parva, Annaghdown; dissolved c.1542?, probably suppressed	St Mary de Cella Parva; Cellnamanagh; Kilnamanoch; Killinimanach; Cella Parva St Mary; Cell-coemain
Killeely Monastery		early monastic site	
Killeenmunterlane Monastery		early monastic site	
Killower Monastery		early monastic site; erenaghs 11th century	Killawyr
Killursa Monastery		early monastic site, founded by St Fursa (Fursey); erenaghs at least to 11th century; church passed to the Fratres Cruciferi of Castledermot	Cell-fursa; Rathmat; Rathmath; Rathmuighe
Kilmacduagh Monastery		early monastic site, founded 6th-7th century by St Colman son of Duagh on land granted by Guaire, King ruined by William Fitz Adelm de Burgo early 13th century; episcopal diocesan cathedral 11th century; Augustinian Canons Regular founded 1225-50; dissolved 1584; granted to Richard, Earl of Clanricarde	St Mary de Petra ____________________; Cell-mic-duaich; Duaca; Kil-macough
Kilmeen Monastery		early monastic site	Cell-mian
Kilmurry Friary		Franciscan Friars given as Dominican Friars (Note: H. T. Knox, Notes on Early History of Dioceses of Tuam, Killala and Achonry, 1904, p.296)	Cell-mhuire; Kilmurray
Kilreekill Monastery		early monastic site, nuns reputedly founded by St Patrick for his sister Richella	Cell-richill
Kiltiernan Monastery		early monastic site	Cell-tighernain
Kiltullagh Monastery		early monastic site; possibly not continuing after 10th century	Cell-tulach-mhaonmhai
Kinalehin Friary, nr Abbey		Carthusian monks — possibly from Hinton founded c.1252 by John de Cogan I; purportedly destroyed 1279 and if so, rebuilt soon after; sold to the Hospital of St John of Jerusalem 1306 - the Knights appear to have held appurtenances, though the sale appears never to have completed; dissolved by General Chapter the Grande Chartreuse 1321; abandoned by the monks c.1341; Franciscan Friars Minor, Conventual refounded c.1371 by the de Burgos, granted by the Pope; destroyed after the general suppression; purchased from Elizabeth I by Richard de Burgo (Rufus), Earl of Clanricarde, who retained it for the friars dissolved before 1609; Observant Franciscan Friars refounded 1611; dissolved after 1642; friars probably expelled under the Cromwellians; returned during the reign of Charles II	Abbey; Kilnalahan; Kinaleghin; Kenaloyn; Cenel-Feichin; Cineoil-Feichin; Kilnalekin; Kinelfeichin
Kinvarra Monastery		early monastic site, patron St Coman	Ceamm-mhara; Cenn-mara
Knockmoy Abbey		Cistercian monks — from Boyle founded 1190 by Cathal Crobderg O'Conor, King of Connacht; dissolved 1542, surrendered by Abbot Hugh O'Kelly 24 May 1542, though a secularised form of monasticism apparently continued; let to Andrew Brereton for 21 years, 1566; part granted to Nicholas FitzSymons 1568; QE	Abbeyknockmoy Abbey; Collis Victoriae; Cnoc-muaidhe; Knockmuighe; Mainister-cnoc-muaide
Kylemore Abbey		Benedictine nuns Abbey founded in 1920 by nuns from Ypres, Belgium. Mansion served as convent boarding school until closure in 2010	
Lissonuffy Cell	Historical county location. See County Roscommon		
Loughrea Priory		Carmelite Friars founded c.1300 by Richard de Burgo, Earl of Ulster; dissolved before 1541; granted to Richard, Earl of Clanricarde 1652; friars permitted to remain; Teresian (Discalced) Carmelites occupied intermittently from 1640	St Mary ____________________; Loch-riach; Laughreagh; Lough-Reogh; Balliloc riagh
Loughrea Abbey *		Discalced Carmelite Friars founded 19th century; extant	
Maghee Monastery ^{~}		early monastic site, possibly County Galway, location unidentified	Mag-Cé; Magele; Magelle; Magtriudi
Mayfield		Augustinian Friars refuge from Dunmore 1645	
Meelick Friary ^{+}		Franciscan Friars Minor, Conventual founded 1414, mandate to license a Franciscan foundation issued to the Bishop of Clonfert by the Pope; Observant Franciscan Friars refounded 1479; dissolved 1559, suppressed and ruined; restored 1595; dissolved after 1595; granted to the Earl of Clanricarde; church and buildings largely destroyed by c.1616; Observant Franciscan Friars 1680, intermittently until 1852; now R.C. church	Mil-eagh; Miliuc; Milick; Mykescin
Monasternalea Monastery		early monastic site erroneously purportedly Franciscan Friars, (Note: Canice Mooney, The Franciscans in Ireland, Terminus (Mar-Apr 1956), p.143;) — reliable evidence lacking	Abbey Grey Monastery; Abbeygrey Monastery; Mainistir na Liath; Kilmore-ne-togher?
Moor Abbey, parish of Athenry		Cistiercian monks? possibly chapel of Moor Aughrim at a grange of Knockmoy	
Omey Monastery		early monastic site, founded 7th century by St Fechin of Fore with the aid of King Guare; ruins excavated and re-sited by archaeologists in 1990s	Iomaidh; Immagh; Temple-feheen
Portumna Friary		Dominican monks founded before 1414 by Murchad? O'Madden, Lord, on the site of the Cistercian monks' priory (see immediately below); dissolved c.1582; granted to the Earls of Clanricarde 1582; part used as C.I. church 1631; choir became C.I. church 1762; Observant refounded before 1426	The Friary Church of the Blessed Virgin Mary, Portumna ____________________; Portumna Abbey
Portumna Priory		Cistercian monks chapel, dependent on Dunbrody; founded 1254; became disused; Dominican friary founded on site (see immediately above)	The Priory Church of Saint Peter and Saint Paul, Portumna ____________________; Portumna Abbey; Portomna; Portompria
Rafwee Monastery		early monastic site, coarb 11th century	Raithbuidhe
Rathmagh Monastery		early monastic site, founded 6th century by St Brendan of Clonfert	Raithmaige
Roscam		early monastic site, founded before 779; destroyed by the Danes 807	Ros-chaim; Ros-camm
Ross Errilly Friary		Franciscan Friars Minor, Conventual founded 1351 (1431) by Raymond de Burgo; Observant Franciscan Friars reformed 1470 (1498) by the Grannard family (William, Lord Grannard?); dissolved 1562; granted to the Earl of Clanricarde by Elizabeth I 1562; friars afforded protection by Clanricarde friars left before 1580; re-established by Clanricarde 1580; expelled by Protestants and English soldiers 1580; occupied by English soldiers 1596; friars reinstated before 1601; abandoned by friars to escape imprisonment; reinstated 1611 by Clanricarde; expelled 1612; returned 1626 and 1641; abandoned 1656; reoccupied and repaired 1664; abandoned after 1688; returned 1712; possibly expelled 1731; returned 1753, restored by Lord St George; dissolved 1832; ruinous by 1835; (NM)	Ross; Ross-erelly; Ross-eriall; Ros-traily; Ros-oirbealaigh; Ruisairbhealaigh; Iriala
Rosshill Monastery		early monastic site, reputedly founded by St Brendan of Clonfert; "'Abbey' site" (Note: Ordnance Survey)	Teampull Brandon
Roundstone Monastery	Historical photo; Historical photo	Franciscan Friars, Third Order Regular founded 1835; site redeveloped	
St Macdara's Island Monastery		early emeritical monastic site, founded by St (Sionnach) Mac Dara	Cruach Macdara; Cruanacara
Templemoyle-Kiltullagh Friary		Franciscan Friars, Third Order Regular founded after 1441; dissolved 1595; granted to Edmond Barrett	Tombmoyle
Tisaxon Friary		Franciscan Friars, Third Order Regular founded before 1442, mandate issued to the Bishop of Ballysadare by the Pope; dissolved 1574; granted to Thomas Lewes 5 April 1574	Teagh-saxon; Theascaston; Trachsasson cf. Templegal
Toghergar Friary		purported Franciscan Friars — reliable evidence lacking	
Toombeola Abbey		Dominican Friars dependent on Athenry; apparently founded after January 1427 by Chieftain O'Flaherty, when papal licence obtained to build a monastery; dubiously suggested Augustinian Friars - Dominicans possibly gave shelter to friars of other orders in penal periods dissolved after 1558; seized by the Protestants reoccupied 18th century	St Patrick ____________________; Tuaim-beola; Tom-beola; Tum-beola
Tuam Monastery ^{+}		early monastic site, founded 6th century by St Jarlath (Iarlath); episcopal diocesan cathedral 1111; extant	
Tuam Augustinian Abbey		Augustinian Canons Regular — Arroasian priory or hospital founded c.1140 by Turlogh O'Connor; raised to abbey status c.1360?; dissolved c.1562, c.1572; granted to Richard, Earl of Clanricarde; Augustinian Friars refounded	St John the Evangelist ____________________; St John in the suburbs
Tuam Friary		Fratres Cruciferi founded 1140 by an O'Connor	
Tuam Nunnery		purported nuns or Premonstratensian Canonesses — evidence lacking; a tenement owned by the Arroasian nuns of Kilcrevanty existed in Tuam (Tuaym) 1223-4	
Tuam Premonstratensian Abbey		Premonstratensian Canons daughter house of Cockersand?; founded 1203-4?; revived from Prémontre? 1217-8?; burned with the town and other churches 1244; dissolved c.1574	The Holy Trinity ____________________; Tuaim-da-ghuallann; Tuaim-da-gualand; Tuaim-da-valuin
Tuam Abbey of the Scrin ^{≈}		order, foundation and period unknown — listed 1574; the church of the Shrine apparently adjacent to the cathedral — possible reference to the vicars' college or Fratres Cruciferi	

Return to top of page

==== County Kerry ====
(For references and location detail see List of monastic houses in County Kerry)

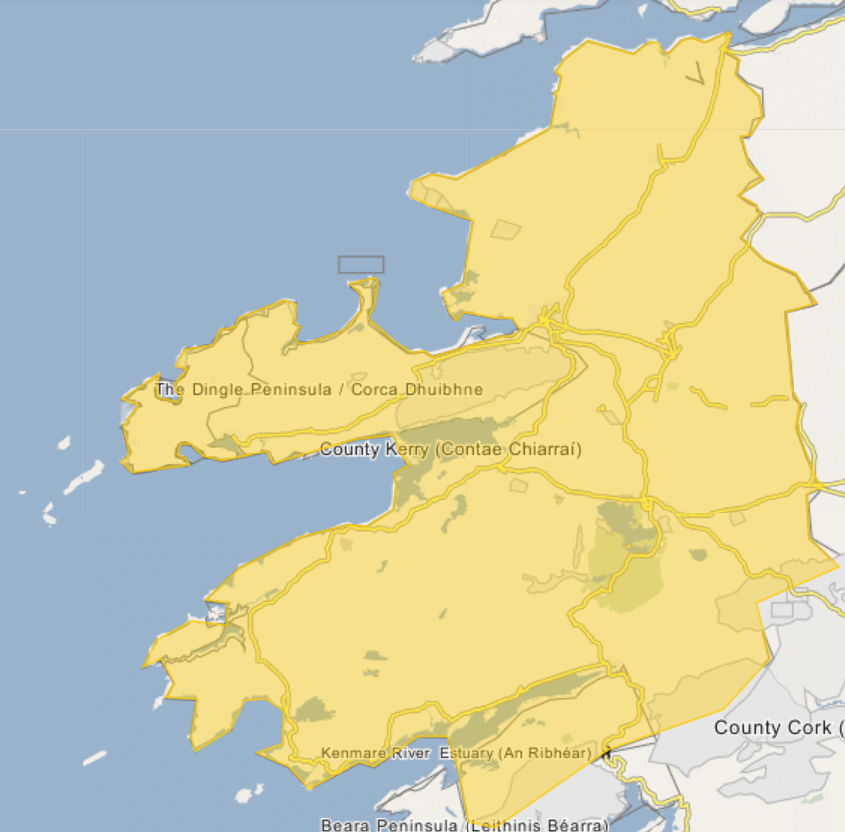
Locations of monastic houses in County Kerry

Foundation	Image	Communities & Provenance	Formal Name or Dedication & Alternative Names
Abbeydorney Abbey		Cistercian monks — from Monasteranenagh daughter house of Monasteranenagh; founded 1154 founder unknown - erroneously given as a Fitzmaurice; daughter house of Mellifont; daughter house of Monasteranenagh restored; dissolved 1537 (though last abbot active until 1577) site now in use as a graveyard	Odorney; Kyrie Eleison; Monaster-O-d'Torna
Aghadoe Monastery		?Augustinian Canons Regular purportedly founded 7th century by St Finan Lobhar; extant 992; non-monastic church of the Holy Trinity and St Mary built on site 1158; damaged by gales 1282; erenaghs up to 1450 (NM)	Achad-da-eo; Aithedea
Alltraige-caille Monastery ^{~}		early monastic site, founded 6th century	
Ardfert Friary		Franciscan Friars Minor, Conventual founded c.1253 by Thomas Fitzmaurice Fitzraymond, Lord of Kerry, purportedly buried here; Observant Franciscan Friars refounded 1517; dissolved 1584, friars expelled, some remained in the area;(NM)	Ard-ferta-brenainn; Hertfert; Hyferte; Ifert
Ardfert Dominican Friary ^{≈}	Dominican Friars — erroneous reference to the Franciscan Friary (see immediately above)		
Ardfert Cathedral Monastery		early monastic site, founded 6th century by St Brendan of Clonfert; episcopal diocesan cathedral founded after 1111, translated from Ratass	
Ballinskelligs Priory		early monastic site founded 11th century?; Augustinian Canons Regular — Arroasian founded c.1210?; dissolved after 1555; granted to John Blake 1585; (NM)	Ballin-skelligs; St Michael de Rupe; St Michael's Mount
Bentee Mount Monastery		early monastic site, Anchorites	
Brandon Mountain Monastery		early monastic site, Anchorites, purportedly founded by St Brendan of Clonfert; possibly continuing after 1111	
Caherbarbagh Monastery		early monastic site, Anchorites	
Carrig Island Monastery, ^{ø} Arghavallen parish		possible early monastic site, "Abbey (in ruins)" (Note: Ordnance Survey)	
Church Island Monastery, Valentia Harbour; Lough Kay			Cherich-inis?; Lough Kay
Church Island Monastery, Lough Currane		early monastic site, Anchorites; founded by Finan Cam	Lough Curane
Derrynane Abbey		early monastic site, Gaelic monks founded 7th century by the monks of St Bairre or by St Finan Cam	Achad-mor; Abbey Island; Darrynane; Ahamore; Aghamore
Dingle Cell		Augustinian Canons Regular cell, dependent on Killagha — probably not conventual, possibly a vicarage; founded after 1216; dissolved before 1428	Daingean-ui-chuis; Dingle-i-cuche
Dingle Friary		Dominican Friars possible vicarage and land owned by the Black Friars	Daingean-ui-chuis; Dingle-i-cuche
Feaghman West Monastery		early monastic site, Anchorites	
Gallarus Monastery		early monastic site, Anchorites	Gall-ros
Illaunloughan		early monastic site, stone oratories	
Illauntannig Island Monastery, Maghree Islands		early monastic site, Gaelic monks; founded 6th century by St Seanach	
Innisfallen Abbey, Innisfallen Island		early monastic site, founded 7th century by Faithlann, son of Aedh damhan, King of Iar-muman (or Finan Lobhair, or Finan Camm; Augustinian Canons Regular founded after 1197?; dissolved 1589? — probably abandoned by 1589; granted to Robert Collam; granted to Valentine Brown; Augustinian Friars (NM)	St Mary ____________________; Inis-faithlen; Inys-fachlyn
Inishtooskert Monastery		early monastic site, Anchorites	St Brendan
Inishvickillane Monastery		early monastic site, Anchorites	St Brendan ____________________; Inis-mic-cilleain
Keeldarragh Monastery		early monastic site, Anchorites	
Kerry Preceptory, ^{~} Tralee?		Knights Hospitaller founded before 1212; dissolution unknown	
Kilcolman Abbey, Milltown		early monastic site	Killagh; Killaha
Kildreelig Monastery		early monastic site, Anchorites	
Kildreenagh Monastery in Loher		early monastic site, Anchorites	
Kildrenagh Monastery in Valencia		early monastic site, Anchorites	
Killabuonia Monastery		early monastic site, Anchorites founded 6th century by Buonia (Beoanigh)	
Killagha Abbey, Milltown		early monastic site, Gaelic monks founded 6th century by Abban (Alban); probably dissolved for some time prior to the Augustinian foundation; Augustinian Canons Regular founded c.1216 by Geoffrey de Marusci (during the reign of King John); dissolved 1576; granted to Thomas Clinton and subsequently to Thomas Spring	St Mary de Bello Loco ____________________; Cell-achaid-conchinn; Kill-agha; Kill-egue; Kilcolman; Killahensis in Munster (under Augustinian Friars)
Killarney Franciscan Friary *		Franciscan Friars transferred from Gorey 1860; church opened 1867; friary opened 1879; became the Novitiate House of the Irish Province for a time; extant	
Killemlagh Monastery ^{~}		early monastic site, founded by St Finan the Leper, or chapel by St Finan Cam	
Killiney Monastery		possible early monastic site; St Saviour's C.I. parish church built on site	
Killobarnaun Monastery		early monastic site, Anchorites	Killavarnaun
Killoe Monastery		early monastic site, Anchorites	
Killogrone Monastery		early monastic site, Anchorites	
Kilmalkedar Monastery		early monastic site, probably continuing after 1111	Cell-maeilchetair
Kilrellig Monastery, Bolus Head			
Kilpeacon Monastery		early monastic site, Anchorites	Kilpeacan
Lislaughtin Abbey		Observant Franciscan Friars founded 1470-7 by John O'Connor, Lord of Iraghticonnor, who had requested permission from the Pope in 1477; dissolved 1580, destroyed by the Protestants; rebuilt 1629; granted to James Scrolls; granted to Sir Edward Denny (NM)	Leasa-lauchtin; Lislachtin; Hilleanbegha
Lisselton Friary ^{≈}	erroneous reference to Franciscan Friars — mistaken identification of Lislaughtin		
Muckross Abbey		Observant Franciscan Friars founded 1440-8 by Donal, son of Thady MacCarthy, possibly on the site of an earlier monastery; restored by Donal, son of Thady MacCarthy 1468; dissolved 1586-9, purportedly leased out 1587; granted to Robert Collan 1595; reoccupied 1612; old buildings restored after 1617	The Holy Trinity ____________________; Carraig-na-chiuil; Irrelagh; Irialach; Monaster-Airbhealaigh; Oirbhealach
Oriel Monastery		early monastic site	Monaster-ni-Oriel; Abbey Oriel
Rathmore		Cistercian monks founded 1861; temporary refuge for monks evicted from Melleray, France	
Ratass Cathedral Monastery		early monastic site, founded 6th century; probably continuing after 1111; episcopal diocesan cathedral founded 1111, church elevated to cathedral status by the Synod of Rathbreasail; translated to Ardfert before 1117	Raith-maige-deiscirt; Rathass
Rattoo Monastery, nr Ballyduff		early monastic site - founded 6th century by Bishop Lugaid/Lugach	Rath-muighe-tuaiscirt - "fort/rath of the northern plain".
Rattoo Abbey, nr Ballyduff		possibly Fratres Cruciferi or Knights Hospitaller hospital founded c.1200 by Brother William; ?Augustinian Canons Regular — Arroasian founded before 1207; dissolved 1542, officially suppressed, convent possibly continued until c.1581; fortified by the Irish, who destroyed it to prevent it falling to the forces of Sir Charles Willmott; (NM)	The Hospital of Saint John the Baptist; The Priory Church of Saint Peter and Saint Paul ____________________; Ballyduff Abbey
Riasc Monastery		early monastic site, Anchorites founded 6th century; probably continuing after 1111	Reask
St Manchan's Monastery		early monastic site, Anchorites founded by St Manchan	Teampall Geal
Scarriff Monastery		early monastic site, Anchorites	Sgairbh
Skellig Michael Monastery, Great Skellig Island		early monastic site, purportedly founded by a St Finan; plundered by the Danes 824; rebuilt 860; most of the community transferred to Ballinaskellig probably before mid-11th century, hermits probably remaining into the medieval period	Great Skellig; Raith-maigi-tuaiscirt; Rath-maigi-tuaiscirt; Rath-maigi-tuaidh; Rath-maigi-tuoindhi; Rath-maigi-tuoinoyd; Rath-maigi-toy; Rath-maigi-ytue; Doraythoyg; Rahtuahc; Raythnayt
Temple Cashel Monastery		early monastic site, Gaelic nuns	
Termons Monastery		early monastic site	
Tralee Holy Cross Priory		Dominican Friars founded 1243 by Lord John FitzThomas FitzGerald (John of Callan), buried here; dissolved 1580	The Dominican Church of Holy Cross Abbey; The Priory of the Holy Cross, Tralee

The following location in County Kerry lacks monastic connection:

- Ardfert Abbey: Georgian mansion, home of the Crosbie family, destroyed by IRA bomb 1922

Return to top of page

==== County Kildare ====
(For references and location detail see List of monastic houses in County Kildare)

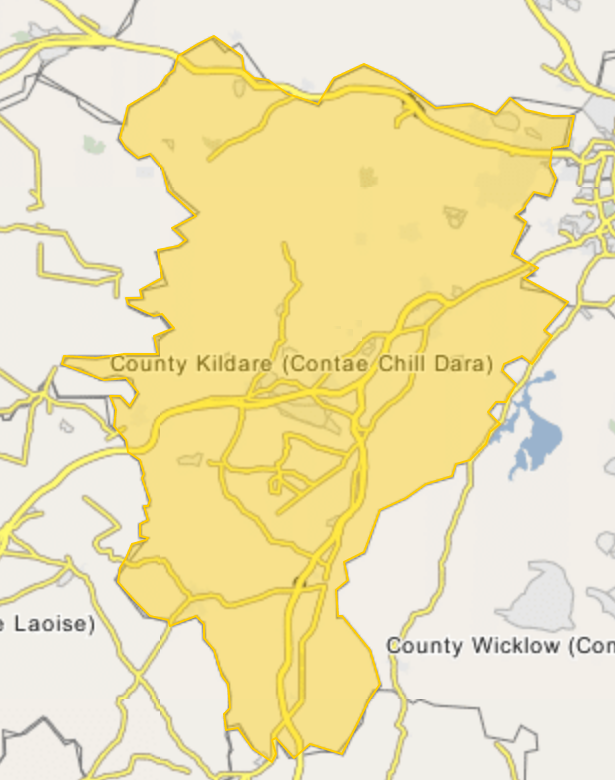
Locations of monastic houses in County Kildare
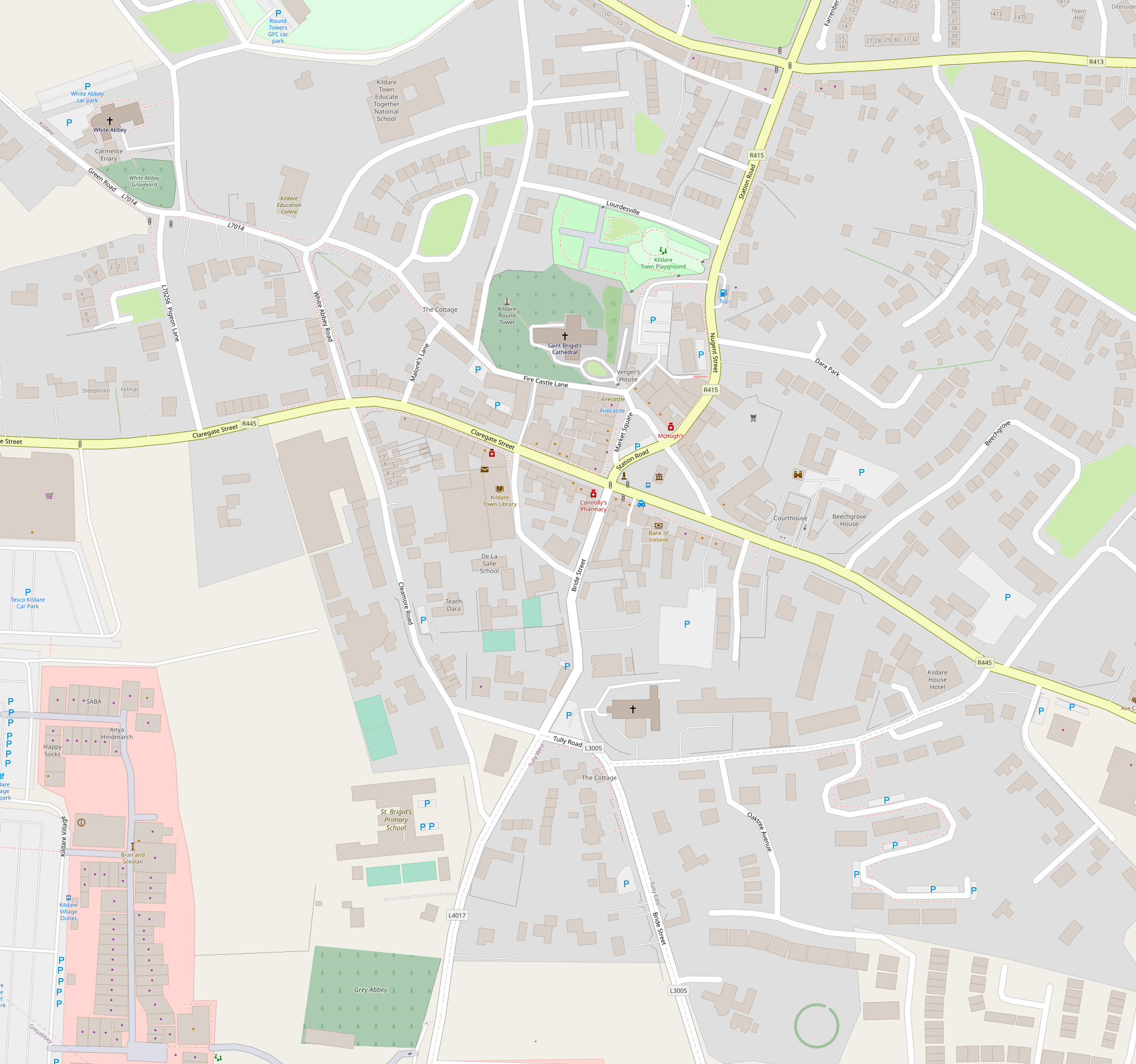
Locations of monastic houses in Kildare
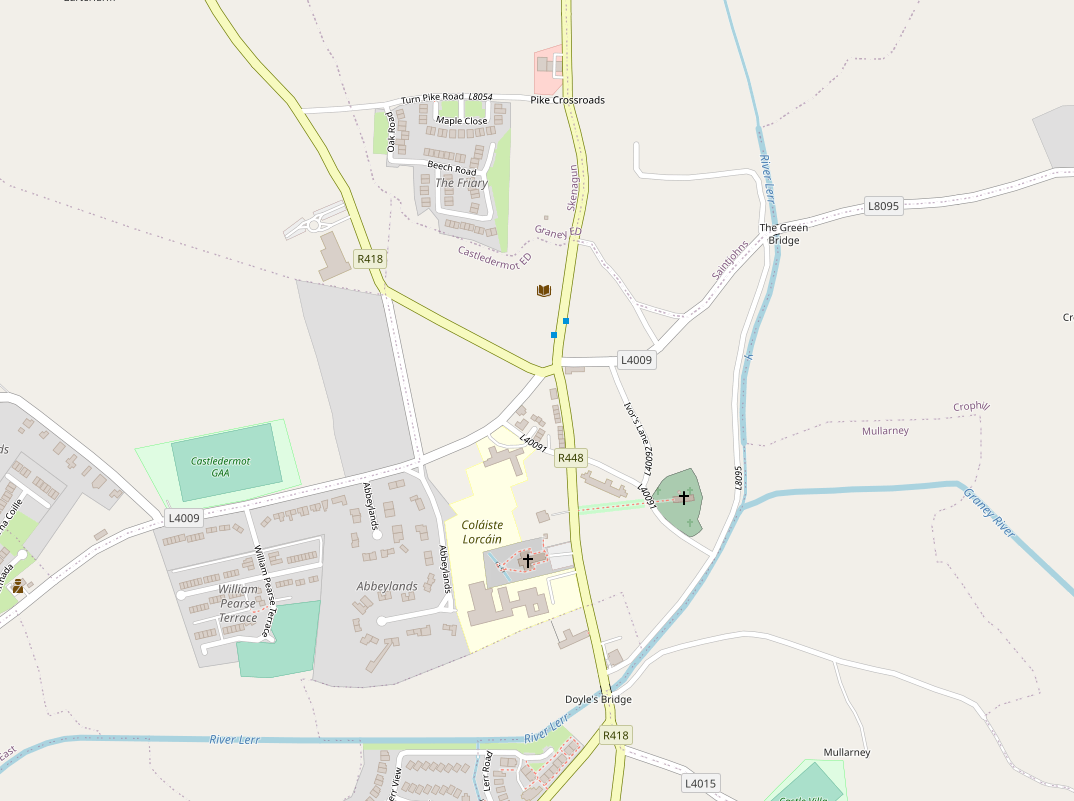
Locations of monastic houses in Castledermot
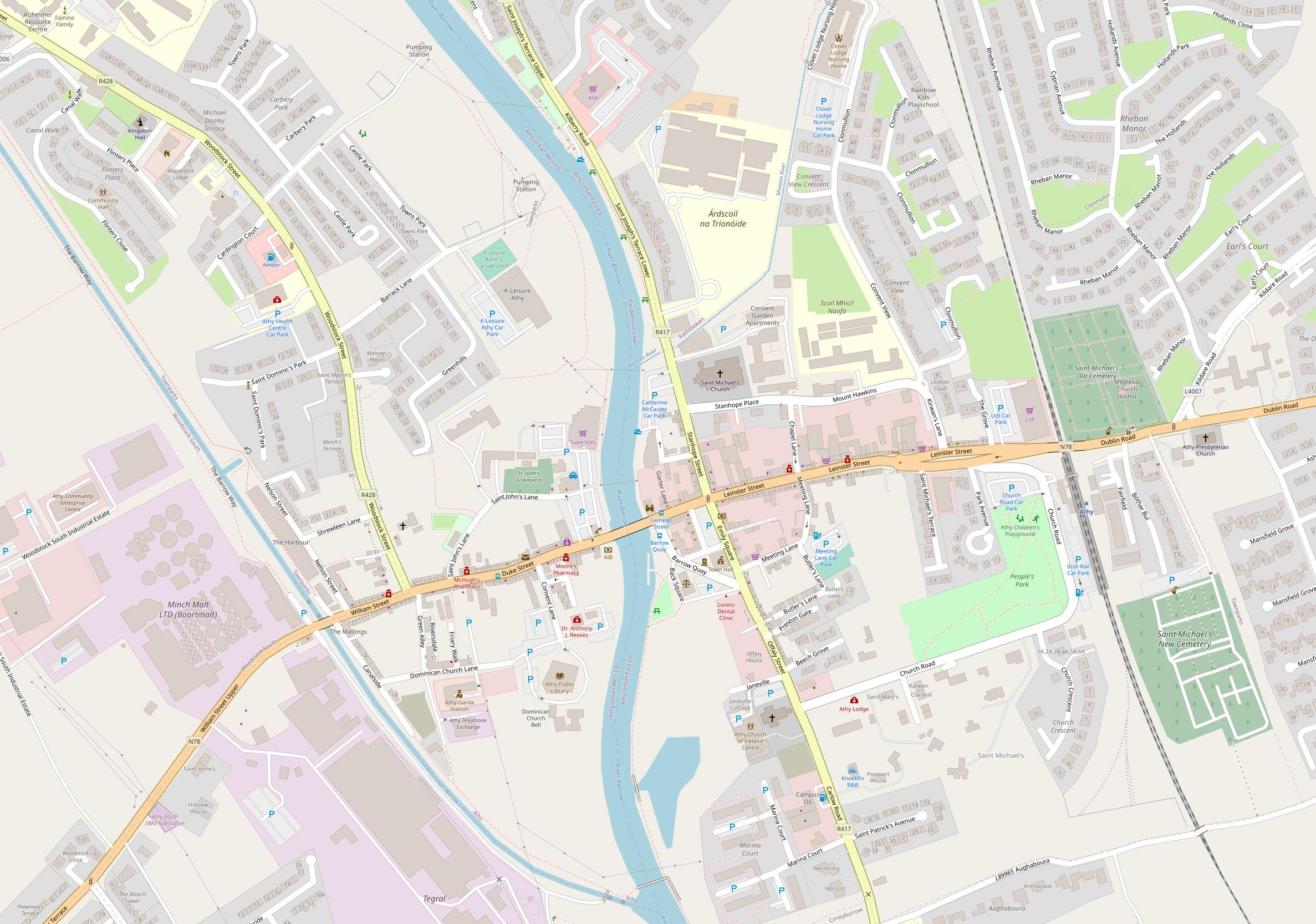
Locations of monastic houses in Athy

Foundation	Image	Communities & Provenance	Formal Name or Dedication & Alternative Names
Athy Priory *		Dominican Friars founded 1253-7; dissolved 30 April 1539; rented to Martin Pelles 26 April 1540; refounded c.1622 by Fr Ross Mageoghegan; chapel enlarged 1864-7; dissolved mid-19th century; new church built and opened 17 March 1965; extant; old church demolished 1973	St Peter, Martyr; St Dominic ____________________; Bailr-atha-ai; Athai; Athies
Athy Priory Hospital		Fratres Cruciferi founded after 1199 (1253?) by Richard de St Michael, Lord of Rhebane (during the reign of King John); dissolved 1540	The Priory of Saint John; The Priory of Saint John and Saint Thomas of Cruciferi; St Thomas the Martyr (from 13th century)
Castledermot Friary		Franciscan Friars founded before 1247; dissolved 1540	Disert-diarmuta; Tristle-dermot; Desert
Castledermot Monastery		early monastic site, Gaelic monks founded 842 by the son of Aed Roin, King of Corcu Bascind; plundered by the Danes 842; burned 1106; probably continuing after 1111	Disert-diarmuta; Tristle-dermot; Desert
Castledermot Priory		Knights Templar? (according to tradition); Fratres Cruciferi (re)founded before 1216 by Lord Walter de Ridlesford (during the reign of King John); dissolved 1540; St John's Tower is the only surviving remnant	Priory and Hospital of Saint John the Baptist
Celbridge Abbey *		built 1697 by Bartholomew Van Homrigh, Lord Mayor of Dublin; St John of God Hospitallers operated as a care home	
Clane Friary		Franciscan Friars Minor, Conventual founded 1258 by Gerald FitzMaurice FitzGerald, Lord of Offaly, purportedly buried here 1287; dissolved 1540; granted to a number of people 1541-2 for the use of Sir Thomas Luttrell; friars remained until monastery destroyed c.1606; restored 1647; dissolved c.1650	Cloenath; Claenath; Claenad; Claona; Cleonad; Cloney; Cluain
Clane Monastery		early monastic site, Gaelic monks founded c.800 by St Ailbe; probably continuing after 1111	
Clonagh Monastery ^{ø}		possible monastic site — order and period unknown land obtained by priests 1396 without the King's consent, and concealed from the King	
Cloncurry Friary		Carmelite Friars founded 1347 by John Roch (Roche), license granted by Edward III; dissolved 1539, church seized 30 April 1539; granted to William Dickson 1543; passed to Richard Slayne; passed to the Foster family; William Foster had purportedly been seized of the monastery by the time of his death 1602; convent restored by c.1737	Cluain-conaire; Concurry
Cloncurry Monastery		early monastic site, reputedly founded by St Ninian (Mo-nenn)	
Donaghmore Monastery		Patrician monks/Columban monks founded 6th century	Domnach-mor-maige-laudat
Dunmanoge Monastery		early monastic site, Gaelic monks church founded by Finnian of Clonard, land granted by Carbreus, King of Leinster; probably not continuing after 10th century	Mugna-moschenog; Mugna-helchan; Mugna-selchain?
Dunmurraghill Monastery		early monastic site, Gaelic monks church founded by St Patrick; probably not continuing after 10th century	Druim-urchaille; Droma-urchaille
Graney Abbey		Augustinian nuns — Arroasian priory founded c.1200 by Walter de Riddlesford; raised to abbey status before 1276; dissolved 7 February 1539; granted to Leonard, Lord Grey; granted to Anthony St Leger 1542	St Mary ____________________; Graine; Grane; Greyn
Grangerosnolvan Monastery		nuns according to tradition; Cistercian monks grange of Baltinglass	Grange Nolven
Great Connell Priory		Augustinian Canons Regular dependent on Llanthony; founded 1202 by Meyler fitz Henry, Justiciar, buried here; dissolved 1540, before 24 November; granted to Edward Randolfe; granted to Sir Edward Butler; granted to Sir Nicholas White 1560; granted to Edmond Butler 1566	St Mary and St David ____________________; Greatconnell; Monaster-Conghbala; Conal; Connayl
Inchaquire ?Friary		Dominican Friars license granted 1488; possibly a vicarage of Athy between 1488 and 1627	Intyma Kudir; Inseueyr
Kilberry 'Abbey' ^{ø}		supposed monastic site - order and period unknown; "abbey", (Note: Ordnance Survey) traditionally a nunnery; possible Knights Hospitaller with sisters attached	Cel-berra
Kilcock Monastery ^{ø}		supposed nuns — order and period unknown	Cell-cocha; Cell-coice; Cell-cork
Kilcork Camera		Knights Templar founded 13th century; dissolved 1308; manor exchanged with Thomas Fitz John, Earl of Kildare 1318, rectory retained for the Knights Hospitaller	
Kilcullen Abbey		Observant Franciscan Friars founded 1486 (1470 (Note: Analecta Hibernica (Irish Manuscript Collection) No.6, November 1934, iii, p.197 — but 1486 on p.200)) by Roland FitzEustace, Baron of Portlester, buried here; dissolved before 30 April 1539, appurtenances seized, occupied by Thomas (Eustace), Lord of Kilcullen; expelled 1547; granted to Edmund Spenser 1582; 1640s	New Abbey; Cell-ciluinn; Ouen
Kildare Abbey		early monastic site, nuns; founded 5th century (c.430) by St Brigid; monks and nuns double monastery before 528; plundered a number of times; Augustinian nuns — Arroasian? founded after 1171?; episcopal diocesan cathedral built in the abbey grounds between 1223 and 1230, extant; dissolved 1540-1; farmed by Francis Cosby and Raymond Oge (FizGerald) 1448; granted to Anthony Deering 1585	St Brigid
Kildare — Grey Abbey		Franciscan Friars Minor, Conventual founded c.1254 by the ancestors of the Earls of Kildare or 1260 by Gerald Fitz Maurice, Lord Offaly or William de Vescy; Observant Franciscan Friars refounded 1520; surrendered 30 April 1539; occupied by Philip FytzMores (Fitzmaurice); granted to Daniel Sutton 1543; destroyed 1547 and abandoned; reestablished 1621 dissolved c.1770	
Kildare — White Abbey		Carmelite Friars founded 1290 by William de Vescy; dissolved April 1539, surrendered by the prior; granted to William Dickson; new church built 1884	St Mary
Killashee Monastery ^{#}		early monastic site, founded 5th century by St Patrick; plundered in raids by the Danes 1035; remains of non-monastic 15th-century round tower on site	Cell-ausaille; Cell-usaille; Kill-auxille; Kill-Osey; Kill-usaille
Killelan 'Abbey'		Knights Hospitaller hospital confirmed by Innocent III 1212	
Killybegs Preceptory		Knights Hospitaller founded before 1212, confirmed by Innocent III dissolved before 1400	Kilbegge; Kilbegs
Kilrush Cell		Augustinian Canons Regular cell dependent on Cartmel; founded c.1201; leased by Prior Rawson to Thomas Alen and Mary his wife 1527; dissolved before 1540; granted to Thomas, Earl of Ormond 1558	Cell-rois; Kylros
Kilteel Preceptory		supposed early monastic site Knights Hospitaller founded before 1212 by Maurice FitzGerald, confirmed by Innocent III; dissolved before 1527	Cell-cele-Croist; Kil-heel; Kil-hele; Kil-hill; Kylehale
Knocknacree Monastery		order, period and foundation unknown; formerly traces of a religious foundation (Note: Mervyn Archdall, Monasticon Hibernicum, 1786, p.332)	Knocknacroith
Leixlip Abbey ^{ø≈}		land granted to St Catherine's, Dublin before 1224; reference to 'monastery' probably error for a chantry; rectory held by St Thomas's Abbey 1540	The Blessed Virgin Mary; The Abbey Church of Saint Wolstan, Leixlip
Lully Monastery		early monastic site, founded before 584; Anchorites before 784	Lilcach; Liolcaig; Lullymore
Maganey Monastery ^{ø}		purported early monastic site, founded 6th century? by St Abban, son of Cormac, King of Laigin	Mag-arnaide; Maghinemna; Moyarney
Monasterevin Monastery ^{#}		early monastic site, founded by St Emin, buried here; Cistercian monks Consecrated 27 October 1189 (1178?) dedicated to St Mary and St Benedict, site granted and confirmed by Dermot O'Dempsey, King of Offaly; dissolved 1540?; granted to George, Lordd Audley; assigned to Adam Loftus; later to the family of the Earl of Drogheda; site now (thought to be) occupied by a stately home named 'Moore Abbey', in use as a hospice 1945–present (below)	Monaster-evan; Ros-glaisi; Ross-glass-na-muimnech; Rosglas; Rosea Vallis
Moone Abbey		early monastic site, founded 6th century, probably by St Colmcille, patron; purported medieval religious house — order unknown	Maein-Choluim-Chille; Maon-Choluim-Chille; Monmohenock; Mooney
Moone Friary ^{ø}		suggested Franciscan Friars founded 1258 by Sir Gerald Fitzmaurice — contemporary evidence lacking — possible confusion with Clane	
Moore Abbey *, Monasterevin		Sisters of Charity of Jesus and Mary founded 1945; extant; stately home (thought to be) built on the site of Monasterevin Monastery (above), in use as a hospice	
Naas Priory		Augustinian Canons Regular founded before 1200? by a baron of Naas; hospital added; dissolved 1539, surrendered by Prior Thomas Poswyk 26 July 1539; granted to Thomas Alen of Dublin 20 April 1540; granted to Richard Mannering 1553; leased to Roger Finglas 1568	St John the Baptist ____________________; Nas-na-rig; Nais; Nasse; Le Nas; Nasa; Nass; Asensis; Vas
Naas Austin Friary		Augustinian Friars founded 14th century? purportedly by a White, or a Cullen of Dublin; dissolved 1539-40; rented by John Sutton after 1540; owned by Hugh Molton 1580-1; leased to Nicholas Aylmer, for fifty years, in 1584	'The Monastery of the Moat'
Naas Priory		Dominican Friars founded 1355-6, licensed by Edward III c.1356; dissolved 1540; granted to Robert Eustace and others 15 June 1542, for the use of Sir Thomas Luttrell; later assigned to John Travers; now at Newbridge	St Eustace
Naas Hospitallers		Knights Hospitaller frankhouse; held by James Tyrrell 1540; held by Walter Hope of Mullingar 1578, under lease granted by Prior Massingberd of Kilmainham	
Old Kilcullen Friary ^{ø}		purported Observant Franciscan Friars (Note: J. Cooke, Handbook for Travellers in Ireland, 1910) p.38 — erroneous reference (Note: communications of Canice Mooney, O.F.M.)	
Old Kilcullen Monastery		early monastic site, chapel and cloister founded 5th century by St Patrick; plundered by Amlaibh from Dublin 938, 939, 944 burned 1114	Cill-Cuillind
Naas — Millbrook Monastery		early monastic site, founded by St Fechin of Fore, land granted by the King of Leinster	Tulachfobhair
Naas Nunnery		early monastic site, nuns, founded by St Patrick	
Oughterard Monastery		early monastic site, nuns, founded 6th-7th century by St Brigid (not Brigid of Kildare); church and round tower largely destroyed by Vikings in 995; northwest of Kill	Uachtar-aird
Rathbride Camera		Knights Templar founded 13th century; dissolved 1308; passed to Knights Hospitallers, but exchanged with Thomas Fitx John, Earl of Kildare 1318, rectory retained by Hospitallers	Rathbrigte
St Simon's Friary near Naas		Carmelite Friars — possibly Cloncurry	
St Wolstan's Priory		Augustinian Canons Regular — Victorine founded c.1205 by Richard, first prior, and Adam de Hereford; dissolved 1536, suppressed 15 September; granted to John Alen, Lord Chancellor, 1 December 1536, last prior allowed to remain in residence for life	Scala Caeli
Taghadoe Monastery		early monastic site, founded by St Tua (Ulstan the Silent)	Teach-tua; Teach-tua
Timolin Monastery^{#}		early monastic site	Tomolin; Tech-moling; Themolyngbeg; Tynolingbeg; Tomolyng
Timolin Priory		Augustinian nuns — Arroasian founded c.1199 by Robert, son of Richard, Lord of Norrach; church and chapels granted by William de Piro, Bishop of Glendalough, confirmed by Henry, Archbishop of Dublin 1220; dissolved 1538; held by Edmund Eustas from 14 January 1538; granted to Henry Harrington 1581; part granted to Terence (Tirlaughe) O'Brien 1594	St Mary
Tully Abbey		Knights Hospitaller founded before 1212, confirmed by Innocent III 1212; dissolved before 1527; granted to David Sutton 1538	Black Abbey
Yeomanstown Friary		Dominican Friars — from Naas founded after 1666, transferred from Naas; transferred to Newbridge 1756	

Return to top of page

==== County Kilkenny ====
(For references and location detail see List of monastic houses in County Kilkenny)

Foundation	Image	Communities & Provenance	Formal Name or Dedication & Alternative Names
Achardensis Friary ^{ø~}		supposed Augustinian Friars, possibly in the barony of Ossory location unknown	Achiardensis; Archer?
Aghaviller Monastery		early monastic site, patronised by St Brendan of Birr	Achad-biroir
Anothmolt Abbey		Cistercian monks — from Stanley, Wiltshire (community founded at Loughmerans c.1202); transferred here c.1204; dissolved c.1207, transferred to new site at Graiguenamanagh	Annamult; Achermolt; Athermolt
Ballylarkin Abbey ^{ø}		asserted monastic site, order unknown founded 13th century?; 'abbey'; (Note: Ordnance Survey) ruins of a parish church; (NM)	
Calime in Leinster ^{~≈?}		Augustinian Friars, probably a duplication of Callan	possibly Callan
Callan Priory		Augustinian Canons Regular founded c.1215	'Callan Abbey'
Callan Augustinian Friary		Augustinian Friars founded 1461 (1468-9) by James (buried here), son of Edmund Butler (son of Sir Richard Butler) who, with his wife, petitioned the Pope who instructed the Abbot of Ferns to instigate the foundation; Observant Augustinian Canons Regular refounded 1472; ruinous by 1540; dissolved 1540, surrendered by Prior William O'Fogarty; held by the executors of the estate of the late Earl of Ormond 1548; granted to Thomas, Earl of Ormond 1557-8 with friars in occupancy periodically	Calainn; Calime
Callan Friary		Augustinian Friars founded 1766	
Clonamery Monastery		early monastic site	St Bronndan
Clonfert Kerpan Abbey^{~}		early monastic site, founded 503	
Clonmore Monastery		early monastic site, granted to St Mochoemoc (Pulcherius)	Cluain-or, in Ossory
Columbkille Monastery		early monastic site, founded 6th century by St Colmcille	Kilgriffin
Duiske Abbey ^{+}, Graiguenamanagh		Cistercian monks — from Stanley, Wiltshire (community founded at Loughmerans c.1202) transferred here from Annamult c.1207, built by William the elder, Earl of Pembroke; dissolved 1536; part of church is in R.C. ecclesiastical use; (NM)	Graiguenamanach; Graignambreathach; Douske; Duiske; Donyske; Vallis S. Salvatoris
Drumdelig Friary		Dominican Friars (Note: Tomas de Burgo, Hibernica Dominicana, 1762 edition, p.206, no.iv, repeated by Mervyn Archdall, Monasticon Hibernicum, 1786, p.373) novices house, or Franciscan Friars (Note: W. Carrigan, History and Antiquities of the Diocese of Ossory, 1905 iii. p.195) (the latter had land near Dromdelygen 1541)	Thornback; Druim-Deilgneach; Dhrime-Dhilignach
Ennisnag Monastery^{# C.I.}		early monastic site, founded c. 6th century, by Manchan; Prebend Church, founded 1291 by papal authority suppressed c. 16th century; ruins new Protestant church, St. Peters, founded 19th century.	Saint Manchan, Saint Máedóc -------------- Inis-Snaig; Inisnag
Fertagh Priory		early monastic site, founded 5th century by St Ciaran of Seirkieran (St Keiran); Augustinian Canons Regular founded before 1251 by the English family of Blanchfield; destroyed and ruinous 1421; rebuilt 1455 by Thady Megirid, a canon of Inchmacnerin; dissolved 1540; priory church in parochial use by 6 January 1541; occupied by Nicholas Cowlye; held by Sir Edward Butler 1566; reverted to James Butler, Jr 1566-7;-1780; now part of a handball alley	St Keirman ____________________; Fertae-cairech; Fertnegeragh; Fertakeyra; Frattakyreach; Grangefertagh
Fiddown Monastery		early monastic site, founded before late 6th century; coarbs at least until 1073; church demolished 1870	Fedh-duin; Fiodh-duin; Fid-duin
Freshford Monastery ^{+}		early monastic site, founded 655-7 by St Lachtain mac Torben, Abbot of Achaid-Ut; probably continuing after 1111; site currently occupied by 17th-century St Lachtain's parochial church incorporating 12th century doorway	Achad-ur; Aghoure
Gowran Camera		Knights Templar founded before 1253; dissolved 1308, church passed to the Hospitallers	Gabran; Gawran
St. Mary's Collegiate Church Gowran		Collegiate Church; Founded before 1225, Contains a Christianised Ogham Stone from 3rd/4thc. Also the oldest inscribed effigy in Ireland of Ralph, portrieve of Gowran in 1218. The effigy is dated 19 March 1253. The church also contains tombs and effigies of the Butlers of Ormonde. Experts believe that St. Mary's Church was built on the site of an earlier monastery. dissolved 1308, church passed to the Hospitallers	Gabhrán; Gowran
Inistioge Abbey ^{=+}		early monastic site, possibly founded 6th century, purportedly by St Colmcille; Augustinian Canons Regular founded c.1206 by Thomas Fitz Anthony; dissolved 1540; church in parochial use by 8 January 1541; occupied by Richard Butler; granted to Sir Edmond Butler 1566; incorporated into current C.I. parish church	St Mary and St Colmcille ____________________; St Columba; Inis-teoc; Inis-tiock; Ynysteoc
Jerpoint Abbey		probably Benedictine monks founded 1158 (1166–70); Cistercian monks — from Baltinglass founded 1180, grant of church confirmed by charter of John, Lord of Ireland, Earl of Morton c.1185; dissolved 1540; church in parochial use by 7 January 1541; granted to Thomas, Earl of Ormond and Ossory 1558; (NM). Thomastown R.C. church contains the high altar from the abbey	Baleochellam; de Geriponte
Jerpoint Nunnery		Cistercian(?) nuns foundation unknown adjacent to the monks' abbey; dissolved 1228, removal ordered by Stephen of Lexington	
Kells Priory		early monastic site, founded by St Ciaran of Seirkieran; secular college founded 1183 by Geoffrey fitz Robert, confirmed by Felix Ua Duib Sláin, Bishop of Ossory; Augustinian Canons Regular — from Bodmin, Cornwall founded 1193 by Geoffrey fitz Robert; burnt by William de Bermingham 1252; dissolved 1540, surrendered by Nicholas Tobin 18 March, or Philip Howleghan, 8 March; occupied by James, Earl of Ormond; church in parochial use by 31 January 1541; part leased to Sir Henry Ratcliff 1576; (NM)	St Mary ____________________; Kells in Ossory; Cananus; Keananas
Kilcolumb Monastery		early monastic site, founded 6th century by St Colmcille; probably continuing after 1161	Cell-colum
Kilfane Monastery		early monastic site, purported 'abbey' founded by St Phian	Cell-phaain
Kilferagh Monastery		early monastic site, purportedly founded by St Fiachrius; church in the monastery of Rathen	Kil-fiachra; Kil-feara
Kilkenny Augustinian Friary		Augustinian Friars "former canons' monastery" (Note: Louis Augustin Alemand, Monasticum Hibernicum, translated and edited by J. Stevens, 1722, pp.309,312,317)	
Kilkenny Black Abbey^{+}		Dominican Friars founded 1225 by William Marshal the younger, Earl of Pembroke (purportedly buried here, but actually at Temple Church, London); dissolved 1540; granted to the Sovereign and commonality of Kilkenny 1543; friars apparently remained in the vicinity reoccupied during the right of Queen Mary; used as a courthouse; church restored 1970s; now in parochial use	Holy Trinity Priory
Kilkenny Carmelite Friary		listed as not restored c.1737 (Note: Arch. Ord. Rome (Carmelite Order), Manuscripts II, C.O. II, 26, p.13 (compiled 1739-59))	
Kilkenny Cathedral Monastery^{+}		early monastic site, founded before 599/600 by St Canice; episcopal diocesan cathedral 1111; extant	
Kilkenny Grey Friary		Franciscan Friars Minor, Conventual founded 1232-40; dissolved 1540; granted to the Sovereign and the commonality of Kilkenny 1543; friars expelled by John Bale c.1550; returned 1553; expelled 1559, abandoned; Observant Franciscan Friars reformed 1609; convent refounded 1612; refounded 1640	The Abbey Church of Saint Francis, Kilkenny
Kilkenny Hospitallers		Knights Hospitaller "liberum hospicum" 1335; "frankehouse" 1541	
Kilkenny Hospital		Knights of St Thomas of Acon founded before 1219 by William Marshall, Earl of Pembroke, confirmed to the knights and brothers by charter of Gilbert Marshall, Earl of Pembroke	The Hospital of Saint John the Baptist
Kilkenny, St John's Priory		hospital, founded c.1202 by William Marshal the elder, Earl of Pembroke; Augustinian Canons Regular founded 1211; dissolved 1540, surrendered by Richard Cantwell, 19 March; in parochial use by 4 January 1541; granted to the Mayor and citizens of Kilkenny	Hospital of St John the Evangelist; The Priory Church of Saint John, Kilkenny ____________________; St John's Priory without the walls; St John the Baptist
Kilkenny Nunnery			
Kilkieran Monastery		early monastic site, high crosses	Cell-cainnig; Canocopolis
Killaloe Monastery		early monastic site, founded c.540 by St Mochua	Cell-molua
Killamery Monastery		early monastic site, possibly founded c.632 by St Gobhan; probably not continuing after 10th century	Cell-Lamhraighe; Killamruidhe
Killenny Abbey		possible Benedictine monks founded 1162-5, site granted by Dermot O'Ryan, liegeman of Dermot Mac Murrough, King of Leinster, to Felix Ua Duib Sláin, Abbot of Ossory, confirmed by Dermot; Cistercian monks — from Jerpoint founded 1184; united to Graiguenamanagh 22 July 1227, confirmed by Stephen of Lexington grange of Graiguenamanagh; granted to Charles Cavenagh, Abbot of Graiguenamanagh for 61 years 10 June 1525; dissolved 1540, remaining in possession of Cavenagh at least until 1548, unknown whether monks remained in occupation	St Mary and St Benedict ____________________; Vallis Dei; Glandy; Barrowmount; Old Abbey
Kilmanagh Monastery		early monastic site, founded before 563? by St Natalis (or Notan); probably not continuing after 10th century	Cell-na-manach
Kilree Monastery		early monastic site, reputedly founded by St Brigid; apparently erroneous reference to foundation of an abbey 1176	Cell-righ
Knocktopher Friary^{^}		Carmelite Friars founded 1356 by James Butler, 2nd Earl of Ormond for the friars already in the town; dissolved before c.1541; granted to Margaret, Countess of Ormond; friars returned 17th century; expelled before 1654; friars returned 1735; convent in existence 1737; remains incorporated into private house, currently in use as a guest house named 'Knocktopher Abbey'	St Mary; The Friary of St Saviour (Note: Lord Killanin & M. V. Duignan, Shell Guide to Ireland, 1962, (new edition 1967), pp.343-4)
Knocktopher Carmelite Friary *		Carmelite Friars returned 1735; convent in existence 1737; new church consecrated 1843; extant	
Loghmere Abbey		Cistercian monks — from Stanley, Wiltshire founded c.1202/4; transferred to Anothmolt before 1207	Loughmerans Abbey
Ossarge Abbey		Benedictine monks dependent on Wurzburg; founded before 1148? (before 1162-5); if Kilkenny, apparently transferred to Jerpoint in, or soon after, 1165; dissolved 1541	Ossory; possibly Jerpoint; possibly Kilkenny
Rosbercon Abbey		Dominican friars founded 1267, purportedly by the Grace family or the Walsh family; dissolved 1539, surrendered by Prior Matthew Flemynge 20 June	St Mary; The Assumption of the Blessed Virgin Mary
Shankill Monastery		"site of Abbey" (Note: Ordnance Survey)	Seincheall
Tibberaghny Monastery		early monastic site, founded 6th century, patronised by St Mo-Dhomnog of Lann Beachaire	Tipra-fachtnai
Tiscoffin Monastery		early monastic site, 'cella' founded 6th century by St Scuithin (Scuithin)	Tech-scruithin; Tech-scoithin; Tascoffin
Tullaherin Monastery		early monastic site, reputedly founded by St Cainnnech; round tower on site	Tulach-tirm; Tulach-Iarain
Tullamaine Monastery		early monastic site; plundered 1026	Tealach-dimainn; Tealach-n-ionmainne
Ullard Monastery		early monastic site, founded before 670 by St Fiachra high cross (9th c.) and ruined church (12th c.)	
Woolengrange ^{~}		Cistercian monks grange of Jerpoint; leased out 1541	

Return to top of page

==== County Laois ====
(For references and location detail see List of monastic houses in County Laois)

Foundation	Image	Communities & Provenance	Formal Name or Dedication & Alternative Names
Abbeyleix Abbey^{#}		Cistercian monks — from Baltinglass founded 1183 by Corcherger O'Moore (Cucogry O’More/Connor O'More); colonized from Baltinglass 7 September 1184 dissolved before 1552?; granted to Thomas, Earl of Ormond 1563	Leix Abbey; Lex Dei
Abbeyleix Monastery (Clonkeen)		early monastic site, founded c.600	
Addrigoole Monastery		early monastic site, nuns founded before 600? by St Finbarr of Cork; probably Augustinian nuns after 1160; dissolved c.1240, convent granted to the prioress and nuns of Kilculliheen by David Fitz Milo, Baron of Overke - no subsequent record of nuns at the convent	Addergoole; Etargabail
Aghaboe Friary		Dominican Friars founded 1382 by Florence Mac Gilpatrick, Lord of Ossory; dissolved 1540; granted to Florence Fitzpatrick, Baron of Upper Ossory 1601	St Canice
Aghaboe Monastery^{#}		early monastic site, founded 6th century by St Canice episcopal diocesan cathedral	Achad-Bo; Aghavoe; Athebowe; Hagevo
Aghaboe Priory		Augustinian Canons Regular founded 1382; on site of Aghaboe Monastery (see immediately above); dissolved; granted to Florence FitzPatrick c.1600	
Aghmacart Monastery		early monastic site, founded 6th century	St Tigernach ____________________; Achad-maic-airt; Achad-mic-airt; Achamicaire; Hacmakarthy
Aghmacart Priory		Augustinian Canons Regular founded before 1168?, supposedly on the site of earlier monastery (see immediately above); dissolved 1540; granted to Florence Fitzpatrick, Baron of Upper Ossory 1601	St Tigernach; St Mary ____________________; Achad-maic-airt; Achad-mic-airt; Achamicaire; Hacmakarthy; Achmacatenis; Achmecart; Ahmart; Amcart
Aghmacart parish 'Abbey', nr Glenmacoll		"Abbey (in ruins)" (Note: Ordnance Survey)	
Annatrim Monastery		early monastic site, founded by St Mochoemoc (Pulcherius)	Eadcruin; Enach-truim
Ardea parish 'Friary' nr River Triogue		"Friary in ruins" (Note: Ordnance Survey)	
Attanagh Monastery		mentioned 1202-18 — possibly Loughill	Athenagh; Athanagh; Loughill?
Ballylynan 'Abbey', nr Killabban parish		supposed monastic site, order, foundation and period unknown; purportedly founded by the O'More family; "Abbey in ruins" (Note: Ordnance Survey)	Abbey of Shanecourt; Old Court
Clonagh 'Monastery', Killabban parish		"Monastery (in ruins)" (Note: Ordnance Survey)	
Clonenagh Monastery		founded 6th century by St Fintan; site now occupied by the remains of Clonenagh Church	Cluain-ednech; Cluain-eidnech; Cluain-oynach
Clonmeen Abbey		supposed monastic site, order, foundation and period unknown; "Site of Abbey" (Note: Ordnance Survey)	Cluain-min
Durrow Monastery		early monastic site, founded by St Fintan Loeldubh of Dermagh in Hiduach	Durmagh-ua-nDuach; Dermagh
Dysartenos Monastery		early monastic site, founded by St Oengus between retiring from Clonenagh and prior to move to Tallaght	Disert-aengusa; Disert-enos
Dysart Gallen Monastery		early monastic site	Disert-Chuilin
Errill Monastery		early monastic site, purportedly founded 5th century by St Ciaran; "Friary (in ruins)" and "Church (in ruins)" (Note: Ordnance Survey)	
Kildellig Monastery		early monastic site	Cell-dellce; Kil-edelig
Kilfoelain Monastery		early monastic site, possibly in County Laois or County Offaly	Cell-faolain; Kilfoylan? (Kilmanaghan parish, County Offaly)
Killabban Monastery		early monastic site, founded by St Abban	Cell-abbain; Kilebbane
Killermoghe Abbey		early monastic site, founded 558 by St Colmcille	Armuighe
Killeshin Monastery		early monastic site, founded late 545 by St Comghan; burned c.1042 by mac Mael-na-mbo; burned 1077; site occupied by ruined 12th-century church (NM)	Gleane; Glenn-uissen; Glinnhussen
Mountrath Monastery		early monastic site, monks, possibly founded 6th century by St Patrick	Muine-ratha
Mountrath Nunnery		early monastic site, monks, possibly founded 6th century by St Brigid	Muine-ratha
Oughaval Monastery		founded c.595 by St Colman of Oughaval; church in parochial use after the 12th century; modified 19th century by the Cosby family	
Newtown Nunnery		purported ruins of a house of nuns, (Note: W. Carrigan, History and Antiquities of Ossory, 1905, ii) foundation, period, order and status unknown	Baile-nua; Cahir
Rathaspick Monastery		early monastic site	Raith-ne-n-epscop
Rosenallis Monastery		founded by St Brigid of Kildare; dissolved 1537	Ros-finglas
Rostuirc Monastery		early monastic site	Rostoirc; possibly Kilbricken (Offerlane parish)
Stradbally Abbey ^{+}		Franciscan Friars founded 1447 by Lord O'More; seized by the English c.1568; dissolved c.1569; large house built by Francis Cosby, from monastic materials; granted to Francis Cosby	Stradbaile-laoighisi; Strad-bhailelaoise; Loyes; Mon-au-bealing; Noughaval; Oughaval (q.v.)
Shrule Monastery		early monastic site, founded by late 5th century; plundered by the Osraigi 864	Sruthair-guairi; Sruthair-ghuaire
Sleaty Monastery		early monastic site, (community founded by St Fiacc at Domnach-feic); transferred here by St Fiacc; plundered by the Osraigi 864; site occupied by remains of Sleaty Church	Slebte; Sleibte; Sletty
Tempulna Cailleachdubh		early monastic site, nuns	
Timahoe Monastery		early monastic site, founded before 654 by St Mochua mac Lonan; burned 1142	Tech-mochua; Timohoe

Return to top of page

==== County Leitrim ====
(For references and location detail see List of monastic houses in County Leitrim)

Foundation	Image	Communities & Provenance	Formal Name or Dedication & Alternative Names
Annaduffe Abbey		early monastic site; founded 766, purportedly patronised by Comin Ea (possibly Cuimmin Fionn, Abbot of Iona); possibly ceased to exist 12th century; C.I. parochial church on site	Annaduff; Annagh-duffe; Annagh-yew; Eanach-Dubh
Cloone Monastery		early monastic site, founded 6th century (probably before 570), by St Cruimthir Fraech (in the time of St Colmcille)	Cluain-chollaing; Cluain-conmaicne; Clone
Cuivelleagh Friary ^{≈}		Franciscan Friars, Third Order Regular founded by Lord of Chanligh, confirmed by the "Bishop of Athenry" (probably Achonry) and the pope; probable mistaken reference to Creevelea (Dromahair), q.v.	
Dromahair Friary		Observant Franciscan Friars founded 1508 by Margaret O'Brien (buried here), wife of Eoghan O'Rourke; burned 1536; rebuilt by Brian Ballach O'Rourke; dissolved c.1598; partly occupied by the English; occupied by a Harrison c.1617; another house built for friars 1618; reoccupied by friars 1642 and shortly after the Restoration to 1837	Creevelea; Craobhliath; Crowlekale; Crueleach; Carrag Patrice; Petra Patricii; Druim-da-ethair; Baile-ui-ruairc; Ballegruaircy; Cuivelleagh ?
Drumlease Monastery		early monastic site, founded 5th century by St Patrick	Druim-lias; Dromleas
Drumreilly Monastery		early monastic site; early bishopric; reference to hospital, 1479	Druim-airbelaid; Druim-erbelaid
Fenagh Monastery		early monastic site; early bishopric; plundered and damaged 1244; possible community in existence up to 16th century	Fiodnacha-maighe-rein; Fidnacha
Jamestown Friary		Franciscan Friars convent founded 1641 or later	Baile-thaidh-duib; Tullagh; Jacobopolis
Killanummery Monastery		early monastic site; erenaghs in 14th century; with hospital 1595	Cell-an-iomaire; Killynonyre
Killarga Monastery		early monastic site; erenaghs until at least 1416	Cell-ferta
Killasnet Monastery		early monastic site, nuns founded by St Osnata	Cell-osnata
Grange of Muintir Eolais (Note: Place names database of Ireland #29298)		"Abbey", (Note: Ordnance Survey) ruins of abbey, (Note: Gazetteer of Great Britain and Ireland, iv, p.2) ruins of church (Note: Lord Killanin & M. V. Duignan, Shell Guide to Ireland 1962, new edition 1967, p.346)	
Port Monastery			Port;
Lough Nahoo Monastery		early monastic site, purportedly founded by 500	Lough-uama; Lough Uva
Monastery of Mohill-Manchan		early monastic site, founded 6th century by St Manchan; Attacked in 1590, parcel of monastery granted to Edward Barret 1592; Mohill granted to Terence (Tirlaughe) O'Byrne 1594	St Mary; Irish: Maethail, Maothail, Maethail-Manachain, Maothail-Manachain; Middle English: Maethla, Moithla, Moethla, Mucgail, Moghill, Mayhel; Latin: Mathail, Nouella
Rosfriar		Franciscan Friars — from Donegal probable place of refuge	
Rosinver		early monastic site, purportedly founded either by St Maedoc or St Tighernach; coarbs recorded to 1438	Ros-inbher
Rossclogher Abbey, Kinlough		early monastic site, nuns founded before 810 by Tigernach (St Tigenach), Abbot of Killeigh, for his mother, St Mella; possible "Abbey" site (Note: Ordnance Survey)	Doire Melle; Doiremelle; Dairemeilli

Return to top of page

==== County Limerick ====
(For references and location detail see List of monastic houses in County Limerick)

Foundation	Image	Communities & Provenance	Formal Name or Dedication & Alternative Names
Abbeyfeale Abbey		Cistercian monks founded 1188 by Brian O'Brien; dissolved c.1209; cell dependent on Monasteranenagh c.1209; dissolved c.1350?; probably residential grange leased to laymen; possibly obtained by Carmelite Friars (v. Felense in Munster, infra)	Feale; Monaster-na-Feile; Felense?
Abington Abbey		Cistercian monks — from Arklow (community founded at Wyresdale, Lancashire c.1196 from Furness, transferred to Arklow before 1204) transferred here 1205, land granted by Theobald Walter, Butler of Ireland; dissolved 1540; secular 1540; restored — recolonized from Furness/Savigny; granted to Walter Aphoell by Edward VI, confirmed by Queen Mary 1553; dissolved after 1557; lease passed to Piers (Peter) Walshe 1562	St Mary ____________________; Mainister-uaithne; Owney; Unquchin; Vetinex; Vogney; Woney; Wotheney; Huena
Adare Friary ^{+}		Augustinian Friars founded before 1316 by John Fitz Thomas Fitzgerald; Observant Augustinian Friars 1472; dissolved 1539-40; friars probably still in occupation until 1559; dissolved c.1581?; leased to John Gold and others before 1583; granted to Sir Henry Wallop 1595; conventual church now in use as C.I. parish church	Black Abbey
Adare Friary, (Franciscan)		Franciscan Friars Minor, Conventual founded 1464 by Thomas Fitz Gerald, Earl of Kildare and his wife Johanna; Observant Franciscan Friars reformed 1466; dissolved 1539-40; apparently unoccupied by 1559; restored by 1579; expelled c.1581 during the Desmond war; granted to Sir Henry Wallop 1595; (re-established at a new location in Adare 1633) now in the grounds of Adare Manor, within a golf course, with public access	The church of Saint Michael Archangel of the Friars Minor ____________________; Athdara; Atdare
Adare Trinitarian Monastery		Trinitarian Friars founded c.1230 (before 1226?); dissolved after 1539? (officially February 1539); granted to Sir Henry Wallop 1595; ruinous church repaired by the Earl of Dunraven 1811; in use as R.C. church	St James; The Holy Trinity ____________________; White Abbey
Adare Dominican Friary ^{≈}	Dominican Friars — erroneous reference to Trinitarian Friary (Note: "Adare Dominican" — The Earl and Countess of Dunraven, Memorials of Adare, 1865, pp.35-6)		
Adare Preceptory		Knights Hospitaller (listed c.1658 (Note: "Adare Hospitallers" — White's List, M. Lenihan, Limerick, its History and Antiquities, 1866, p.562; Registrum Kilmainham, edited by J. T. Gilbert (Rolls Ser.), 1889, pp.140,155))	
Any Friary		purported Augustinian Friars (Note: "Any" — Ware-Harris, History of the Bishops of Ireland, 1739, p.202, probably from Pipe Roll, 17 May year 1, to 21 December year 2, Edw.III) founded during the reign of Edward II, by John, son of Robert and others;	Knockainy; Ballynamona?
Ardaneer Priory		Benedictine monks founded c.1202, land and church granted by William de Burgo to Richard, monk of Glastonbury; dependent on Glastonbury; dissolved 1205?	St Mary ____________________ ?Ardimur; Ardinuir; Oculnid
Ardpatrick Monastery		early monastic site, purportedly founded 5th century by St Patrick; monastic lands recorded as late as 1597	Ardpatricke; Ard-Padraig
Askeaton Friary		Franciscan Friars Minor, Conventual founded 1389?, (Note: Askeaton, 1389 founding — Wadding, who identified Askeaton with Luasia, though Canice Mooney, OFM, communications, notes that this is Latin for Laois) or before 1400 (Note: Askeaton, founding before 1400 — Canice Mooney, OFM, communications, identified convent of Inysgebryny, in existence 1400, with Askeaton)) by Gearóid Iarla (Gerald), 4th Earl of Desmond, (Note: Askeaton founder — cf. E. B. Fitzmaurice and A. G. Little, Materials for History of the Franciscan Province of Ireland, 1920, pp.170,180-1) or 1420 by James Fitzgerald, Earl of Desmond; (Note: Askeaton, 1420 founding — James Ware); Observant Franciscan Friars reformed 1497; reformed 1513; dissolved 1575; (NM)	Athskettin; Easa-geibhteine; Es-geibhteine; Inis-geibhthine; Easa-gebryny
Askeaton Commandery		Knights Templar (Note: Askeaton Commandery — legendary attribution to Templars — T. J. Westropp, Journal, Royal Society of Antiquities in Ireland, xxiv, p.111) founded 1298, attached to the parochial church, (Note: S. Lewis, Topographical Dictionary of Ireland, 1837, i, p.81) now the C.I. parish church of St Mary	
Ballinegaul Friary		early monastic site Dominican Friars founded 1296, rebuilt by the Geraldines; dependent on Kilmallock; granted to Richard Lawless 1551-2; dissolved before 1586, ruinous by 1586; listed as Carmelite 1597 (see immediately below)	Monaster-na-ngall; Burgus Anglorum; Braber duff (Black friars); Ballinegall
Ballinegaul White Friary		Carmelite Friars former Dominican house (see immediately above) listed as White Friars 1597	Monaster-na-ngall; Burgus Anglorum
Ballingarry Abbey		'abbey', (Note: 'Ballingarry Abbey' — Memorial Atlas of Ireland, 1901, given as 'church' on 6-inch Ordnance Survey) unknown order and foundation Franciscan Friars?	
Ballingarry Nunnery ^{~}		supposed nuns — order and foundation unknown	dedication unknown
Ballintubber Monastery ^{≈}		purported Carmelite Friars or Knights Templar granted to Robert Browne possible reference to Rochestown Dominican Friary	
Ballybrood Friary		Franciscan Friars — possible refuge 17th century; purportedly all slaughtered by Oliver Cromwell	
Ballycahane Preceptory?		Knights Templar church confirmed to the Knights Hospitaller 1212 — no record of preceptory	Cathan
Ballynagallagh Priory		Augustinian nuns convent founded 1283 by a FitzGibbon; land here in possession of Llanthony Priory 1360; dissolved before 1548; granted to Edmund Sexton c.1548; some confusion with St Catherine de O'Conyl;	Monaster-nagalliaghduff; Monaster-necallowduffe; Monaster-nicalliagh
Ballyorgan Friary ^{¤≈}	Trinitarian — erroneous reference to Ballinegaul Dominican Friary, supra		Baile-aragain
Ballyorgan Friary		early monastic site, purportedly founded 6th century by St Finnian	Baile-aragain
Bruree Preceptory?		Knights Templar castle purportedly built 12th century by the order; no record of a preceptory	Brugh-righ
Carrigogunnell Preceptory?		Knights Templar (Note: Mervyn Archdall, Monasticon Hibernicum, 1786, p.419 (citing MSS Smith))	Carraic-O-gCoinneal
Castleconnell Friary?		unknown order purported Augustinian Friars founded c.1300; (Note: Lubin: Louis Augustin Alemand, Monasticon Hibernicum, translated and edited by John Stevens, 1722, pp.310,312) "remains of a monastery" (Note: Cassells Gazetteer of Britain and Ireland, i, p.446)	Caislen-ui-chonaing; Castle-Connell in Munster
Castletown-mac-eneiry Monastery		remains of a purported large monastery, (Note: Mervyn Archdall, Monasticon Hibernicum, 1786, Castletown Masaniry:) doubtful	Roque (Castletown, Corcomohide parish)
Clarina Monastery		Autustinian Canons Regular nuns	Cluain-Credhil; (Note: M. Lenihan, Limerick, its History and Antiquities, 1866, p.31); Killeedy?
Cloch-na-monach Abbey		Cistercian monks supposed abbey remains; (Note: Rev. Patrick Fitzgerald and John James M'Gregor, History, Topography and Antiquities of the county and city of Limerick, 1826, Vol 1, p.299 & Mervyn Archdall, Monasticon Hibernicum, p.433) grange of Monasteranenagh	Cloghnamanagh
Cloncagh Monastery		early monastic site, founded before 625 by St Maedoc of Ferns	
Clonkeen Monastery		early monastic site, founded 6th/7th century by St Mo-Diomog (Note: Clonkeen — Lord Killanin & M. V. Duignan, Shell Guide to Ireland, 1962, (new edition 1967), p.352)	
Doon Monastery		early monastic site, founded 6th century (in existence in the time of St Colmcille)	Dunbleschiae
Dysert Monastery, Carrigeen		early monastic site, founded by a St Oengus (purportedly the Culdee)	Disert-aengusa
Felense Friary ^{~≈?}		Carmelite Friars possibly located in County Limerick, possibly former site of Abbeyfeale Cistercians, supra, otherwise county and location unknown	Felense in Munster; Abbeyfeale?
Friarstown Friary		Franciscan Friars, Third Order Regular founded after 1450? (or 13th century by the Clan-Gibbons); dissolved 1544; possibly vacant by 1450; held in rebellion by Gerald Baluff f. Philip until after 1590?	St Francis de Ballynebrahrair ____________________; Ballynabrahrair; Baile-ne-braher; Bally-ne-braher; Clochnamanach Abbey
Galbally Friary	village location — friary located across the county border: see Moor Abbey, List of monastic houses in County Tipperary		
Glenstal Abbey *		Benedictine monks; extant; mansion in monastic use, also serving as a school	
Hospital Preceptory		Knights Hospitaller founded before 1215 (during the reign of King John) by Geoffrey de Mariscis, the Knights being granted royal privileges 1215; dissolved before 1540; farmed out by Pr Rawson; granted to Sir Valentine Browne by Queen Elizabeth; Kenmare Castle built on site by Browne; leased before 1603; granted to Thomas Brown (ancestor of the Earls of Kenmare) 1604	The Preceptory of Saint John the Baptist, Any ____________________; Ane; Any; Hospital of Any; Anye
Hyde Ita Nunnery?		Augustinian Canons Regular nuns, (Note: given by M. Lenihan, Limerick, Its History and Antiquities, 1866, p.31) apparently Cell Ita (v. Killedy)	Hydh Ita; (probably Cell Ita, properly Killeedy)?
Kellis Priory	properly Kells, County Kilkenny (Note: Mervyn Archdall, Monasticon Hibernicum, 1786, p.810)		
Killeedy Monastery		early monastic site, monks and nuns founded c.546 by St Ita; possibly not continuing after the 10th century	Cell-ite; Cluain-chredail; Killita
Kilmacanearla Abbey, Ballingarry parish		"Abbey (in ruins)" (Note: Ordance Survey (6in) and Memorial Atlas of Ireland, 1901)	
Kilmallock Abbey		Dominican Friars founded 1291, land purchased from John Bluet, burgess, with the consent of Edward I; dissolved 1541; leased to James FitzJohn, Earl of Desmond 1548; passed to the Crown and the commonality of Kilmallock 1569-70; friars probably expelled 1571 when the town was sacked; granted to Nicholas Miagh, sovereign of Kilmallock, and to the brethren and community 1594; (NM)	Flacispaghe
Kilmallock Monastery		early monastic site, founded early half of the 7th century by St Mochelloch; plundered 1015	Cell-mochelloc; Cell-dacheallog; Killochy
Kilmallock Monastery		purported Augustinian Canons Regular (Note: White's list c.1658)	
Kilmallock Monastery		purported Augustinian Friars, (Note: Augustin Lubin, Orbis Augustinianus, as given by Louis Augustin Alemand, Monasticum Hibernicum, translated and edited by J. Stevens, 1722, pp.309, 312, 324) in which case founded after 1630	
Kilpeacon Monastery		early monastic site, founded before 690 by St Becan (Mo-Becoc)	Cluain-ard-Mobecoc
Kilrath Monastery		early monastic site, County Limerick? (Note: Tripartite Life of St. Patrick, edited by W. Stokes, (Rolls Ser.), 1887, pp.200, 350)	Cella Rath
Kilsane Nunnery ^{≈¤}	nuns, (misreading of source) (Note: Louis Augustin Alemand, Monasticum Hibernicum, translated and edited by John Stevens, 1722, p.353, misreading of James Ware, De Hibernia et Antiquitatibus ejus, 1654 edition, p.203)		properly St Catherine de O'Conyl, infra
Kilshane Abbey		Cistercian monks — from Corcomroe (County Clare) (Note: Rev. Patrick Fitzgerald and John James M'Gregor, The History, Topography and Antiquities of the County and City of Limerick, 1827, Vol 2, p.380) daughter of Corcomroe; founded 1198 by Donnchad Cairbreach O'Brien, King of Limerick; dissolved c.1200, united to Monasteranenagh	Cell-scanaig; Kil-son; Kil-sonna; Ballingarry; Garra
Kilshane Friary		Franciscan Friars Minor, Conventual founded before 1426? by Fitzgerald, Lord of Clenlis (Note: Rev. Patrick Fitzgerald and John James M'Gregor, The History, Topography and Antiquities of the County and City of Limerick, 1827, Vol 2, p.380) dissolved after 1584	Cell-scanaig; Kil-son; Kil-sonna; Ballingarry; Garra
Kilteely Monastery		early monastic site, founded 6th century by St Patrick	Cell-tidil; Kilteidhill
Kilteely Commandery		Knights Templar chapel, (Note: Mervyn Archdall, Monasticon Hibernicum, 1786, p.425) purported commandery (Note: Cassells, iv, p.1) founded 1291 (Note: Samuel Lewis, A Topographical Dictionary of Limerick County and City, 1837, p.288)	Kildromin Church
King's Island	Franciscan Friars, (misreading of source) (Note: Mervyn Archdall, Monasticon Hibernicum, 1786, p.430, misreading Wadding)		Island near Limerick (Note: Louis Augustin Alemand, Monasticum Hibernicum, translated and edited by John Stevens, 1722) properly Limerick Franciscan Friars, infra
Knockainy Monastery ^{ø~}		purported early monastic site — dubious (Note: Cassells, Gazetteer of Great Britain and Ireland, iv, p.55) unknown order, period or foundation	Cnoc-aine;; Aine-cliath; cf Any; Hospital of Any
Kynnethin Monastery ^{ø≈}		purported Augustinian Canons Regular — possible reference to Keynsham, Somerset, England, which had property in County Limerick	Kynnythin
Lehense Monastery ^{≈}		Carmelite Friars — possible duplication of reference to Barvegalense (Milltown)	possibly Barvegalense (Milltown)
Limerick Crutched Friars Priory Hospital		Crutched Friars founded before 1216 (during the reign of King John) by Simon Minor; dissolved 1537; passed to Augustinian Friars 1632 (see immediately below)	St Mary and St Edmund, King, and the Holy Cross
Limerick Monastery of the Holy Cross		Augustinian Friars founded 1632, previously Crutched Friars (see immediately above)	St Mary and St Edward
Limerick Blackfriars		Dominican Friars founded 1227 by Donogh Carbreach O'Brien, King of Thomond, buried here; (Edward I claimed his own ancestors were the founders); Dominican Friars, Regular Observant reformed 1504; dissolved 1543; granted to James, Earl of Desmond, who restored the friars; forfeited to the Crown 1569-72; granted to Robert Ansley 1589; held by James Gould until his death 1600; (subsequent history O'Heyne, Burgo and Coleman)	St Saviour
Limerick Franciscan Friars		Franciscan Friars Minor, Conventual founded 1267 (during the reign of Henry III) by the de Burgo family (Note: James Ware, De Hibernia et Antiquitatibus ejus, 1654 edition) (Thomas de Burgo (Note: Coll. de Rebust Hibernicis, BM. Additional manuscripts 4814, Sloane, f.5; Rev. Canice Mooney, OFM, Terminus, 1954, p.128) or William de Burgo (Note: Tomas de Burgo, Hibernica Dominicana, 1762 edition, p.754)); Observant Franciscan Friars reformed 1534; dissolved 1534; granted to Edmund Sexton; restored 1540-8; friars expelled by the Protestants 1548; ruinous, owned by Stephen Sexton prior to his death in 1595; abandoned until 1615	
Limerick Priory		Augustinian nuns founded 1171? by Donal O'Brien, King of Limerick; dependent on Killone c.1189; dissolved 1541; farmed out by Edmund Sexton 1548	St Peter ____________________ probably Monaster ne Callow Duffe (Black Abbey)
Limerick Monaster ne Callow Duffe ^{ø~}		nuns — (probable misinterpretation)	probably Limerick Priory
Limerick Preceptory? ^{ø}		Knights Templar or Knights Hospitaller probable Frank House	Luimneach; Lumniac; Limbricen
Lough Gur, ^{ø} near Loghgir		purported Franciscan Friars	probably Friarstown (Ballynabrahrair)
Luddenbeg Monastery ^{ø}		purported monastery (Note: Rev. Patrick Fitzgerald and John James M'Gregor, History, Topography and Antiquities of the county and city of Limerick, 1826, Vol 1, pp.288-9, mentions ruins of abbey of Luden — (Louis Augustin Alemand, Monasticum Hibernicum, translated and edited by John Stephens, 1722, p.361); Luden is actually Louth Park, Lincolnshire) — remains appear to be a parochial church	
Milltown Friary		Carmelite Friars founded 1459-60, land granted to Carmelites Donald Ygormellay and William de Burgo by James Deles, donsel of Emly Diocese, and Kennedy Macbriayn and his brother Torieleus, to build a monastery; dissolved before 1544; restored also mistakenly given as Carthusian (Note: Thomas Dineley (in the time of Charles II), Journal, Royal Society of Antiquaries of Ireland, viii, p.270)	Ballinegall; Barvegalense; Ballywullan; Villa Mollendini; Molingar
Monasteranenagh Abbey		Cistercian monks — from Mellifont founded 1148 (1148/51) by Turlough O'Brien, King of Thomond, confirmed by King John; dissolved 1540; granted to Sir Osborne Echingham 1543; monks apparently continued to occupy until 1579; captured by the English 3 April 1580, during the Desmond rebellion and the monks massacred; (NM)	Monaster-an-Aonagh; Eanach; Monaster-na-maighe; Maigue; Maio; Manister; Nenagh; Nenay
St. Katherine's Abbey, Monisternagalliaghduff, nr. Shanagolden		Augustinian nuns founded 1298; dissolved 1541	
Mungret Abbey		early monastic site, founded before 551 by St Nessan the Deacon; plundered on several occasions 9th-12th century; possible Augustinian Canons Regular for a time, 12th century — documentary evidence lacking; claimed episcopal status 1152 — deemed too close to the see at Limerick to substantiate the claim; (NM)	Mungairit; Moungairid
Newcastle Camera ^{ø}		Knights Templar (Note: White's List ()compiled c.1658 — M. Lenihan, Limerick, its History and its Antiquities, 1866, pp.564, 736) founded 1184, castle of the earls of Desmond built by the Templars, who were stationed here; dissolved before 1308?	Caislen-nua
Old Kildimo Monastery ^{~}		early monastic site, purportedly founded prior to arrival of St Patrick in Munster, (Note: O' Halloran) by Dimma	Cell-diomma; Kildimma
Old Kildimo Preceptory		Knights Templar (Note: Cassells, Gazetteer of Great Britain and Ireland, Vol. 3, p.341); Court Castle founded by the Templars	
Rathkeale Priory		Augustinian Canons Regular — Arroasian — possibly from Rattoo purportedly founded c.1210? by Gilbert Harvey; dissolved 1542; restored, small community possibly in occupation until the Desmond rebellion, c.1581; granted to Sir Henry Wallop c.1594-5	The Abbey Church of Saint Mary, Rathkeale ____________________; Rathkeale Abbey; Ragelli; Ragille; Ragkely; Rakil; Rathgial
Rathkeale Friary ^{ø}	Franciscan Friars (Note: Rev. Canice Mooney, OFM, Terminus, 1956) — no such establishment here		
Rochestown Friary		Dominican Friars founded ?; dependent on Limerick?; dissolved c.1544; granted to Robert Browne	Friarstown Friary, Rocheston; Rocheston; Ballyniwillin; Ballywilliam; Bailenambratharbeg; Mainistirnambratharbeg
St. Katherine's Abbey, Monisternagalliaghduff, near Shanagolden		Augustinian nuns founded before 1261; dissolved before 1567; granted to Sir Warham St Leger 1567; sometime owned by Sir John Desmond leased to James Gold 1583; granted to Sir Hugh Wallop 1594	St Catherine ____________________; St Catherine de O'Conyl Priory; Monasternecallow-duffe; Monasternagalliaghduff; Ballanegillagh

Return to top of page

==== County Longford ====
(For references and location detail see List of monastic houses in County Longford)

Foundation	Image	Communities & Provenance	Formal Name or Dedication & Alternative Names
Abbeyderg Abbey		Augustinian Canons Regular founded before 1216 (during the reign of King John) probably by Gormgall O'Quinn; raised to abbey status after 1487? dissolved 1540; restored?, occupied by John O'Ferral, previously abbot, 1548, by assignment of Sir Thomas Cusak; granted to Nicholas Ailmer, termor	St Peter ____________________; Monaster-darig; Monaster-deirg; Monaster-derick
Abbeylara Abbey		Cistercian monks — from St Mary's, Dublin founded c.1210 by Sir Richard Tuit; colonised 1214; dissolved 1540	Leathragh; Laragh; Leathan; Monaster-Lethratha; Granard
Abbeyshrule Abbey		Cistercian monks — from Mellifont founded 1200 by the O'Ferral family; affiliation changed to Bective 1228; dissolved 1569; suppressed by Queen Elizabeth, 1592; (NM)	Flumen Dei; Sruthair; Schrowl
Ardagh Monastery		early monastic site founded 5th century by St Patrick or St Mel? diocesan cathedral 1111	Ardachad
Ballynasaggart Friary		Franciscan Friars, Third Order Regular founded after 1510? by Geoffrey O'Ferrall; dissolved 1540; Observant Franciscan Friars refounded 1634; dissolved 1811	St John the Baptist Friary (from 1634) ____________________; Ballinasaggart; Baile-na-sagart; Baile-ne-saggard
Cashel Monastery		Augustinian Canons Regular ruins near parish church purportedly remains of a foundation dependent on Inchcleraun (Note: S. Lewis, Topographical Dictionary of Ireland, 1837, i, p.283)	
Clonbroney Abbey		early monastic site, nuns purportedly founded 5th century by St Patrick; dissolved after 1163	Cluain-bronaig; Cluain-ebrone
Cloondara Monastery		early monastic site, probable patron St Ernan of Cloneogher, 6th century	Cluain-da-ratha; Cluain-daragh
Cloneogher Monastery		early monastic site, patron St Ernan, 6th century (in the time of St Colmcille)	Cluain-deochra; Clonogherie; Clonoghrir
Druim-cheo Nunnery ^{ø~}		purported early monastic site, nuns — evidence lacking	Druim-chea; Bawn?
Forgney Monastery		early monastic site, founded 5th century by St Patrick	Forgnaide (approx)
Granard Monastery		early monastic site, founded 5th century by St Patrick, granted by Coirpre's sons	Granairud; Granard Kill
Inchbofin Monastery	Former county location. See List of monastic houses in County Westmeath		
Inchcleraun Priory		early monastic site, founded 6th century (c.540 or probably earlier) by St Diarmuid (Dermod); Augustinian Canons Regular (— Arroasian)? refounded after 1140; plundered several times; plundered 1098 by O'Brien dissolved c.1541	Inis-clothrann; Inis-cloghran; Quaker Island
Inchmore Priory, Lough Gowna		early monastic site, founded 6th century by St Colmcille; Augustinian Canons Regular (— Arroasian)? dependent on Louth refounded after 1140; dissolved 1540, surrendered 8 October 1540; occupied by Lyosagh O'Ferral by 1548, by assignment with Sir Thomas Cusacke; leased to James Nugent 1560	St Mary (from Augustinian refoundation, after 1140) ____________________; Inismor-Loch-Gamna; Inchymory; Columbkille, Lough Gawna/Lough Gowna; Teampull Choluim Cille (early church)
Inchmore Priory, Lough Ree	Former county location. See List of monastic houses in County Westmeath		
Kilcommoc Friary		Dominican Friars — probable place of refuge after expulsion from Longford	Kil-comin; Kil-cumin
Kilglass Monastery		possible early monastic site, nuns possibly founded 5th century by St Eiche, sister of St Mel and niece of St Patrick	Cell-glaissi
Kilmodain Monastery		early monastic site	Abbey of St Modan; Cell-muadain, in Kilmahon?
Longford Friary ^{+?}		Dominican Friars founded 1400 by ——— O'Farrel; Regular Observant Dominican Friars reformed before 1429; dissolved 1540-1, nominally suppressed; friars probably remained in occupation granted to Richard Nugent 1566-7; dissolved 1578?; granted to Sir Nicholas Malby 1578; granted to Francis, Vicount Valentia 1615; restored to the friars 1641 during the Confederation; friars' church in use by the Protestants until mid-19th century; St John's C.I. parish church built on site, possibly incorporating some of the material from the friars' church	St Brigid ____________________ Latoria; Longphort
Longford Monastery ^{ø}	mistakenly-purported early monastic site (Note: Mervyn Archdall, Monasticon Hibernicum, 1786, p.444 gives St Idus having a foundation here, which was actually at Aghade (Ath-fadat—"long ford"), County Carlow)		
Raithin Monastery ^{~}		early monastic site, founded 5th century by St Patrick	Raithen; possibly Leath Rath, (Note: J. J. McNamee, DD, History of the Diocese of Ardagh, 1954, pp.34-5, 541) near Longford
Saints Island Priory, Lough Ree		dubious early monastic site founded before 542 by Ciaran; (Note: James Ware, De Hibernia et Antiquitatibus ejus, 1654 edition, p.172 and others, confuse Saints Island and Inis Aingin, the latter being founded by St Ciaran. Louis Augustin Alemand, Monasticum Hibernicum, translated and edited by John Stevens, 1722, pp.49, 50, has a foundation by Ciaran at both locations, which is possible, though Inis Aingin alone is mentioned in the Life of St Ciaran: Vitae Sanctorum Hiberniae, edited by Charles Plummer, 1910, i, pp.210, 211); Augustinian Canons Regular founded before 1200 by a descendant of Sir Henry Dillon of Drumrany; dissolved after 1600?; Augustinian Friars founded 1643	All Saints; Inis-na-naomh; Oilean-na-naomh; Insula Omnium Sanctorum; Insula Sacra; Holy Island

Return to top of page

==== County Louth ====
(For references and location detail see List of monastic houses in County Louth)

Foundation	Image	Communities & Provenance	Formal Name or Dedication & Alternative Names
Ardee Priory Hospital		Crutched Friars, brethren and sisters founded c.1207 by Roger Pipard; hospital confirmed 1211 by Eugene, Archbishop of Armagh; dissolved 1539, surrendered 6 December 1539 by Prior George Dowdall; granted to George Dowdall (by then Archbishop of Armagh) for life 1544 by Queen Mary; granted to Edward Moore 1579	St John the Baptist ____________________; Ath-fhirdiadh; Ath-firdead; Ath-ferdia; Ath-erdea; Aichirde; de Atrio Dei
Ardee White Friars		Carmelite Friars founded after 1272 (during the reign of Edward I) by Ralph Pipard rebuilt by the townsmen by 1302, land etc granted by John Littleboy and two others; church burnt down 1315 by the followers of Edward the Bruce whilst filled with men, women and children; dissolved 1539; demolished by the commissioners by 30 September 1540 and the materials sold; friars subsequently returned to Ardee	Priory of St Mary of Mount Carmel of Athirde
Ardee Preceptory ^{~}		Knights Hospitaller (Note: White's list c.1658 (M. Lenihan, Limerick, its History and Antiquities, 1866, p.562;, cf. Registrum Kilmainham, edited by C. McNeill, IMS, 1943, pp.140, 155))	
Ardpatrick Monastery		early monastic site, founded 5th century by St Patrick, purportedly a leper hospital, more likely a hospital for the sick (Note: Dr Logan doubts there were lepers in Ireland at the time of St Patrick)	
Ballymascanlan Priory		Cistercian monks apparently intended daughter of Mellifont, 1232-3, on lands granted by Hugh de Lacy; project abandoned 1236, probably deemed too close to Newry	
Carlingford Priory		Dominican Friars founded 1305 or 1307 by Richard de Burgo, Earl (Rufus) of Ulster; (Note: Tomas de Burgo, Hibernica Dominicana, 1762 edition; A. P. Coleman, O.P., The Ancient Dominican Foundations of Ireland, 1902, doubts Earl Richard was founder, suggesting instead that the foundation occurred during the time of Walter or Roland Joyce, Dominican Archbishops of Armagh, 1307-1311 and 1311-1322) dissolved before 1541; disputed between Dominican Friars and Franciscan Friars 1670s Dominican Friars to 18th century, transferred to Dundalk	St Malachy
Cluain-brain Monastery		early monastic site, founded 5th century by St Patrick	Cluain-braoin; Ernatiensis (Ernaide) (Note: according to Colgan)
Clonkeen Monastery ^{~}		early monastic site, probably founded by St ColmanCule; also suggested to have been located in County Laois (Note: Mervyn Archdall, Monasticon Hibernicum, 1786, p.593)	Cluain-cain; Cluain-chaoin
Clonmore Monastery		early monastic site	Cluain-mor-fer-n-arda
Drogheda Friary^{#}		Franciscan Friars Minor, Conventual founded c.1240-45, possibly by the townsmen or Lord Darcy de Platina (Platten), or by the Plunket family, or Lord Ralph Pippard; Observant Franciscan Friars reformed not later than 1506 — possibly initially unsuccessfully; reformed 1518; dissolved 1540, surrendered by Richard MOlane, the guardian, 20 March 1540, granted to Richard Aylmer c.1545; friars possibly in occupation until c.1546, abandoned until a new house was erected 1610	Droched-atha; Droichead-atha; Pontana
Drogheda Priory Hospital — St Mary de Urso		Crutched Friars founded c.1206 by Ursus de Suamel as a hospital for the poor and infirm, initially under a warden, possibly not under the Cruciferi until later; (Note: James Ware, De Hibernia, et Antiquitatibus ejus, edition of 1654) dissolved 1540; granted to the mayor etc of Drogheda 1556	St Mary de Urso ____________________; St Mary d'Urso Abbey; The Old Abbey
Drogheda Priory Hospital — St Laurence		Crutched Friars founded c.1202-1203 by the mayor of Drogheda, lepers transferred from St Mary Magdalen hospital c.1202; dissolved 1540; granted to the Mayor etc of Drogheda 1556	St Laurence the Martyr
Drogheda Priory Hospital — St John the Baptist		Crutched Friars founded before 1216 (during the reign of King John), possibly by Walter de Lacy; dissolved 1539, surrendered 26 July 1539; granted to James Sedgrave before 1554 (during the reign of Edward VI)	St John Baptist
Drogheda — St Laurence's Franciscan Friary ^		Franciscan Friars founded 1840; dissolved 2000; granted to the Corporation of Drogheda (now Drogheda Borough Council); currently in use as an art gallery, Highlanes Gallery	St Laurence
Drogheda White Friars		Carmelite Friars founded after 1272 (during the reign of Edward I) by inhabitants of the English colony; dissolved c.1539; demolished by 11 October 1540; farmed out 1548; friars returned to the town a few years before 1642; convent not recorded as being in existence 1739-59; church rebuilt 1807	St Mary
Drogheda Black Friars		Dominican Friars founded 1224 by Luke Netterville, Archbishop of Armagh, purportedly buried here; Regular Observant Dominican Friars reformed 1484; dissolved 1540, surrendered by Prior Peter Lewis, 20 March 1540 by which time the church and most of dorter were ruinous	St Mary Magdalene
Drogheda Abbey?		Benedictine monks founded before 1171, confirmed 1188;; dissolved after 1238, united with Mellifont between 1238 and 1329	The Blessed Virgin Mary
Drogheda Augustinian Friary *		Augustinian Canons Regular founded 1866; extant	St Augustine
Drogheda Augustinian Priory		Augustinian Canons Regular founded c.1188; dependent on Llanthony, confirmed 1188 and c.1207; quasi-collegiate before 1230; dissolved c.1549?	St Peter
Drogheda Nunnery			
Drogheda Preceptory?		Knights Templar tenements probably a frankhouse	
Dromin Monastery		early monastic site, possibly founded by St Findian	Druim-fioinnl; Druim-finn; Druim-hIng
Dromiskin Monastery		early monastic site founded 5th century by St Patrick	St Lugaid; St Rónán mac Beraig ____________________; Druim-enesclaind; Druim-ineascluin; Drumiskin
Drumcar Monastery		early monastic site, founded by St Fintan; possibly not continuing after 11th century	Druim-caradh; Druim-cara
Drumshallon Priory Cell		purported early monastic site (Note: References in Mervyn Archdall, Monasticon Hibernicum, 1786, p.461, are actually regarding Dromiskin); Augustinian Canons Regular — Arroasian dependent on Holy Trinity, Dublin; founded c.1202; suppressed by Albert, Archbishop of Armagh between 1240 and 1244, the church becoming parochial; confirmed to Holy Trinity, Dublin 1244; dissolved after 1262	St Mary ____________________; Druim salen; Druim-salfind
Dundalk Priory Hospital		possible hospital founded 1160, possibly granted to a de Verdon before 1189; Crutched Friars, brethren and sisters founded before 1189? (during the reign of King John) by Nicholas de Verdon, or (at the end of the reign of Henry II) by Bertram de Verdon; dissolved1539, surrendered by Prior Patrick Galtrym, with the consent of the convent, 23 November 1539 (or 23 November 1540); held by Henry Draycott during the reign of Queen Mary until surrendered it 12 September 1557	St Leonard ____________________; Dun-dealgan; Dun-delca; Srathbaile; Stradbhaile; Stradvalle; Traigh-bhaile-duine-dealgan
Dundalk Franciscan Friary		Franciscan Friars Minor, Conventual founded before 1246 (during the reign of Henry III) by John de Verdon, or his mother Rohesa de Verdon, wife of Theobald Butler; dissolved c.1540; demolished by Lord Grey, the king's deputy by 6 October 1540; granted to James Brandon 1543; friars' community apparently remained in the vicinity Observant Franciscan Friars refounded 1556; dissolved 1563, destroyed and friars expelled by the Protestants 1563 new friary built 1626 (see immediately below)	
Dundalk Franciscan Friary		Observant Franciscan Friars founded 1626 — on finding establishment of Carmelites the Franciscans petitioned for prior rights, upheld by inquiry 1633, ratified by Rome 1638	
Dundalk Carmelite Friars		Carmelite Friars founded before 1626; dissolved, Franciscan Friars' petition for prior rights upheld 1633	
Dunleer Monastery		early monastic site, founded 6th or 7th century by St Forodran; raided on several occasions by Norsemen and by others; burnt 1148	Lann-leire; Lan-leri; Linnleire; Loinleire
Ernaide Monastery ^{~≈}		early monastic site, oratory?, possibly located in County Louth	Ernaensis; Urney?; Nurney? Furney?; Cluainbraoin?
Faughart Monastery		early monastic site, nuns, founded by St Darerca (Moninne)	Fochard; Faugher
Faughart Monastery? ^{ø}		purported early monastic site, monks (Note: Mervyn Archdall, Monasticon Hibernicum, 1786, p.464; Trias Thaumaturga, edited by John Colgan, 1647)	
Kellystown Priory		Augustinian nuns — Arroasian — from Termonfeckin founded after 1507; dissolved c.1517, nuns returned to Termonfeckin;	Calliaghtown; Kaylaghton
Kilsaran Preceptory		Knights Templar founded 12th century by Matilda de Lacy; dissolved 1308-10; granged to Richard de Burgo, Earl of Ulster; Knights Hospitaller founded after 1314, probably surrendered to the Hospitallers by Richard de Burgo dissolved after 1515; held by Sir Oliver Plunkett by 1541; granted to Sir Thomas Plunkett, Lord of Louth 1570; apparently subsequently passed to the Bellew family	Cell-sarain
Knock Abbey		Augustinian Canons Regular — Arroasian founded before 1148 Donough O'Carroll, King of Oriel and Edan O'Kelly (later, bishop of Clogher); church consecrated 1148; dissolved 1539; granted to Sir James Gernon of Killencowle, who surrendered it 1558	St Peter and St Paul ____________________; Cnoc-na-sengan
Linns Monastery		early monastic site, founded before 700 by Colman (Mocholmoc) captured by the Norsemen 841, who built a fortress at the site; (some references mistake Linns for Magheralin, County Down)	Linn-duachail; Linn-hUachaille
Louth Priory		early monastic site, founded 5th century, possibly by St Patrick for St Mochta, a Briton; frequently plundered and destroyed by Norsemen and by others; Edan O'Kelly, Bishop of Oriel, translated his see from Clogher to Louth, monastery elevated to cathedral status; Augustinian Canons Regular founded 1140-8; burnt 1148; Augustinian Canons Regular — Arroasian refounded 1148 by Donough O'Carroll, King of Oriel, and Edan O'Kelly; (probably remained Arroasian until 13th century); burnt 1152; burnt 1160; burnt and laid waste 1166; see translated to Clogherc.1192; Augustinian Canons Regular; 13th century?; dissolved 1539, surrendered by Prior John Wylley (Welle) 20 November 1539; granted to Oliver Plunkett, Baron of Louth 1541; (NM)	St Mary ____________________; Lughmhagh; Lugmaid; Lugbad
Louth Abbey		Dominican Friars	
Mellifont Abbey		Cistercian monks founded 1142, site selected by St Malachy, grtanted by Donough O'Carroll, King of Oriel (buried here); church consecrated 1157dissolved 1539, surrendered 23 July 1539 by Abbot Richard Contour; converted into a house 1556; occupied by Edward More 1566; (NM)	Old Mellifont Abbey; Fons Mellis; Mainister-mor-Droichet-Atta; Drogheda
Mellifont Nunnery		Cistercian? nuns foundation and status unknown; dissolved c.1228	
Monasterboice Abbey		early monastic site, monks founded before 523 (or before 519) by St Buite; plundered 970 by Domnall, King of Ireland; Benedictine monks? 10th century — Danish converts	Monaster-buite; Manister
Monasterboice Nunnery		early monastic site, nuns founded before 523 (or before 519) by St Buite, separate from the monks site	Monaster-buite; Manister
Roosky Priory		Knights Templar? possible preceptory — property here owned by the knights	The Priory
Templetown Camera		Knights Templar founded late 12th century, manor granted by Matilda de Lacy; dissolved 1308-11; Knights Hospitaller apparently managed by Kilsaran Preceptory, supra dissolved after 1515?	Ballug; Coly; Cooley; Cowley
Rosmakea		(to the south of Dundalk) - Franciscan Friars here for a time	
Termonfeckin Abbey		early monastic site, founded 7th century (665?) by St Feching of Fore; plundered 1025; Augustinian Canons Regular — Arroasian, possible double-monastery with nuns refounded c.1144, probably by Donchad (or Donough) O'Carroll, King of Oriel, at the behest of St Malachy and Bishop Edan O'Kelly; dissolved before 1195, church of St Fechin in parochial use, conventual church dedicated to St Mary; Augustinian nuns — Arroasian before 1195 dependent on Odder; refounded c.1383? dissolved 1539, surrendered by Mary Hubbard, Abbess; leased to Catherine Bruton 1578	St Mary

The following location in County Louth lacks monastic connection:
* Knock Abbey (Note: Knock Abbey, County Louth: Buildings of Ireland: National Inventory of Architectural Heritage)

Return to top of page

==== County Mayo ====
(For references and location detail see List of monastic houses in County Mayo)

Foundation	Image	Communities & Provenance	Formal Name or Dedication & Alternative Names
Aghagower Abbey		early monastic site, Patrician monks founded in the 5th century by St Patrick; Augustinian Canons Regular	Aughagower; Achad-fobuir; Achad-fabhair
Aghamore Monastery		early monastic site, founded by St Patrick for Loam	Achad-mor; Aghavower
Airne Monastery		early monastic site, probably founded in the 5th century, in the time of St Patrick	Ciaraige Airne
Annagh 'Abbey', Kilmaine		Augustinian nuns — Arroasian — from Cong cell, dependent on Kilcreevanty; founded before 1440; dissolved before 1543? - Augustinian Friars? (Note: Mervyn Archdall, Monasticon Hibernicum, 1786 p.493); Franciscan Friars? possibly occupied site after suppression of the nunnery	Annies; Any; Enach
Annagh, Costello ^{≈}		Augustinian Canons Regular supposed cell dependent on Cong; possible confusion with Annagh, Kilmaine	
Ardnaree Friary, Ballina		Augustinian Friars founded before 1400 by the O'Dowda family; partial collapse and rebuilding, possibly refounded by Tagd O'Dowda; dissolution unknown, friars thought to have retained until 1577–82, remaining in the vicinity up to the late 18th century	Ardnary; Arnacensis
Balla Monastery		early monastic site, founded before 637 by St Mochua (Cronan); burned 780; coarbs into the 13th century	Balna
Ballentully Monastery ^{~}		unknown order and foundation; given as Franciscan Friars — evidence lacking Ballintully possibly Turlough (q.v.) possibly Ballintober (q.v.)	
Ballina Monastery ^{≈}		unknown order and foundation — (Augustinian Canons Regular if Ardnaree)	probably Ardnaree (q.v.)
Ballinasmale Friary		Carmelite Friars founded 1288-9 by the Prendergast family; dissolved 1605?; granted to Sir John King c. 1605–06; passed to Francis Barkly 1585; convent restored by c. 1737; dissolved 1870	St Mary ____________________; Ballinasmall; Ballinsmaula; Baile-an-smallie; Vallis Mallis?
Ballinrobe Priory		Augustinian Friars founded c. 1312? probably by a de Burgo, possibly Elizabeth de Clare (also suggestedly Maurice Fitzgerald) dissolved c. 1584?; Augustinian Friars restored after 1641 rebellion	Baile-an-rodhba; Robe
Ballinrobe St John the Baptist		Knights Hospitaller member of the Priory of the Hospital of St John of Jerusalem	
Ballintubber Abbey ^{+}		early monastic site, founded in the 5th century, in the time of St Patrick - Augustinian Canons Regular founded 1216 by Cathal (Crobderg) O'Conor, King of Connacht; burned 1265; surrendered (nominally) to Henry VIII by Abbot Walter Mac Evilly de Stanton 1542; dissolved c. 1585; part granted to Sir John King 1605; Augustinian Friars apparently refounded c. 1635-1653; restored 1966; (NM)	The Holy Trinity ____________________; Ballintober; Baile-an-tobair; Tobar-patraic; Ville Fontis Patricii; de Fonte Patricii
Ballyhaunis Friary *^{=}		Augustinian Friars founded c. 1430 supposedly by the Angulos (the Nangle-Mac Costello family), traditionally by a descendant of Jordan Dubh Mac Costello; granted to the Earl of Clanricarde 1570; friars permitted to remain; dissolved c. 1586?, land surrendered by the Mac Costello to Theobald Dillon; dissolved c. 1608?; Augustinian Friars restored after the Irish Rebellion 1641; burned 1650; restored 1938; extant	The Blessed Virgin Mary; The Immaculate Conception ____________________ 'The Abbey' ; Bellafamensis; Hanrahannassa
Ballyhean Monastery		early monastic site, supposedly founded in the 5th century by St Patrick	Bel-athat-hein; Ballyheane
Burriscarra Abbey		early monastic site Carmelite Friars founded 1298, probably by Adam, son of Philip de Staunton; dissolved c. 1377, abandoned for over 30 years; Augustinian Friars founded 1413, granted at the instance of the descendants of the founder, consent by the Maurice, Archbishop of Tuam, with papal approval 1413;	Buirghes-ceinn-trachta; Borriscara; Burgakere; Burgoflore
Burriscarra Friary ^{≈}		Franciscan Friars, Third Order Regular (Note: Analecta Hibernica (Irish Manuscript Commission) No.6, November 1914, i, p.104)	Buires Ceara; Cera; Leighcarrow-clondore (Clondaver)
Burrishoole Friary		Dominican Friars founded c. 1469 by Richard de Burgo of Turlough, Lord Mac William Oughter, who died here, papal consent 1486; dissolved 1580; granted to Nicholas Weston and assigned to Theobald Viscount Costillogalen; restored; dissolved c. 1606; granted to John King of Dublin 1606	St Mary ____________________ 'Burrishoole Abbey' ; Barasoule; Borisol; Buresula
Carheen Friary		suggested Dominican Friars before moving to Urlaur	
Carn Abbey		unknown order, foundation and period, "Abbey in ruins" (Note: Ordnance Survey)	
Cell Tog Monastery		early monastic site, founded in the 5th century by Cainnech, bishop and monk of St Patrick	Cellola Tog
Church Island Monastery, Lough Carra		early monastic site, founded by St Finan (Note: Archdall confuses with Rathenepscop (Rathaspick), County Donegal)	Rathen
Clare Island Abbey		Cistercian monks founded by 1224; convent driven off by pirates became cell of Abbeyknockmoy after 1224 dissolved during the reign of Queen Elizabeth?; probably place of refuge for Carmelite Friars with other orders in the late 16th and 17th century	Saint Brigid's Abbey; The Blessed Virgin Mary (from 1254) ____________________ 'the Abbey' ; 'Friary' (1605); Mainister-ni-clarch; Cliara; Cleara; Clara; Insula Maris; Oilen-ui-maile
Cong Abbey		early monastic site, founded 624 by Domnal, son of Aedh; diocesan cathedral 1111 (diocese not recognised by the synod of Kells) burnt 1114; Augustinian Canons Regular refounded c. 1134? by Turlough O'Conor; burnt 1137; new monastery built by Rory, Turlough's son; Augustinian Canons Regular — Arroasian adopted probably soon after 1140; dissolved before 1568?; granted to William Collier 1571; granted to the town of Athenry 1597; possibly Augustinian Friars (if Crenquerensis (see immediately below)); (NM)	Cunga-Feichin; Conga
Crenquerensis Friary		Augustinian Friars possibly located in County Galway, probably Cong, former house of Augustinian Canons (see immediately above)	Cong?
Cross Priory		Augustinian Canons Regular 153,168 founded as a daughter house of Ballintuber, possibly in connection with the early foundation at Inishglora whose community possibly moved to the mainland in the 10th century, confirmed 1400, dissolved c. 1584	St Brendan, Blessed Virgin Mary, Holy Cross ____________________; Cross in Mullet; Cross-rathig; Crossrayn
Crossmolina Priory		possible early monastic site in the 10th century; Augustinian Canons Regular founded after c. 1270; dependent on Ballybeg; non-conventual by 1438; given as conventual cell 1444 dissolved c. 1584?	The Abbey Church of the Blessed Virgin Mary ____________________; Mainishir Taobh Thiar do Shruth; Crossmalyne; Cros-Maoiliona; Cros-mail-fhina; Cresmuylyana; Crossmolina Abbey
Davaghkeiran Monastery		early monastic site, 'Abbey'	Dabach-cieran; Dabaghkieran
Domnach-mor Monastery		early monastic site, founded in the 5th century by St Patrick	
Duvillaun Monastery		early monastic site, Anchorites	
Emlagh Monastery ^{≈}		early monastic site	Imleach-each; possibly Emlagh, County Roscommon
Errew Abbey		early monastic site Augustinian Canons Regular priory cell dependent on Crossmolina? founded c. 1413? by the Barret family dissolved c. 1585? Augustinian Friars mentioned 1463; monastery/friary 1585-6; friary 1605	St Tigernan ____________________; Aireach-lochacon; Aired-locha-con; Erew; Loch Conn; Oired; Oreab; Temple-na-galliach-dhub; Erevensis in Connacht?
Errew Friary ^{ø}		purported Franciscan Friars, Third Order Regular — evidence lacking	
Errew Nunnery		nuns order, status, foundation and dissolution unknown	
Fochlud Monastery		early monastic site, nuns, founded in the 5th century by St Patrick;	Fochloth
High Island Monastery		early monastic site, founded in the 7th century; (NM)	Ard Oilean
Inishglora Monastery		early monastic site, nuns, founded before 577-83 by St Brendan; probably transferred in the 10th century to Cross, supra, due to raids by the Norsemen	St Brendan ____________________; Inis Gulair Brenaind
Inishkea North		early monastic site, founded in the 6th century by St Colmcille?	Inis-ce
Inishmaine Abbey		early monastic site, founded in the 7th century by St Corbmac; possibly Benedictine nuns (unless not united with Kilcreevanty until after its adoption of Augustinian rule); Augustinian nuns — Arroasian (Note: Louis Augustin Alemand, Monasticum Hibernicum, translated and edited by John Stevens, 1722, p.156 lists as Benedictine and located in County Roscommon) — possibly from Annaghdown; [?re-]founded after 1223 (after 1227?); dependent on Kilcreevanty dissolved c. 1587?; (NM)	Inis-medhon; Inis-meadhoin; Inis-meadhon; Inchmean
Inishrobe Monastery		early monastic site, founded in the 6th century by St Colmcille?	Inis-rodba
Inishturk Monastery ^{#}		early monastic site, supposedly founded in the 7th century by St Colman; Friars possible place of refuge	Inis-torc; Inis-tuirc
Kilfinain Monastery		early monastic site, founded by St Finan, Abbot of Rathen; church in the monastery of Rathen	
Kilgharvan Monastery		early monastic site, founded in the 7th century by St Fechin of Fore	Cell-garbhain; Kilnegarvan
Kilkeny Friary ^{≈~}		purported Friars, possibly Franciscan Friars, name possibly an alias for another house	Kylkeny; Kilveny
Killala Monastery ^{+}		Patrician monks founded in the 5th century, purportedly by St Patrick; diocesan cathedral 1111 to present	Aladh; Cell-aladh
Killedan Friary ^{≈}		Franciscan Friars Minor, Conventual or Franciscan Friars, Third Order Regular; existing into the 19th century if Mons Pietatis	Mons Pietatis?
Killeen Cell,^{≈} Attymas		Premonstratensian Canons (Note: Hubert Thomas Knox, History of County Mayo, p.97, f. — no other record of such an establishment)	possibly Killeentrynode
Killeenatrava Nunnery		Augustinian nuns — Arroasian — apparently from Cong; possibly initially a cell of Cong, founded after 1223; dependent on Kilcreevanty after 1223-4; dissolved during the reign of Queen Elizabeth	Kill-ecrau; Kill-eenacrava; Cillin-na-mbuiden
Killeenbrenan Friary		Franciscan Friars, Third Order Regular — possibly brethren and sisters; founded before 1426, possibly by a de Burgo; (Note: Hubert Thomas Knox, History of County Mayo, p.96) dissolved 1574; granted to Thomas Lewis 5 April 1574; granted to the burgesses and commonalty of Athenry and/or the burgesses and commonalty of Galway, 1578	Killina Bonaina; Kilbrenan
Killeentrynode Cell		Premonstratensian Canons founded 1260; daughter of Loughkea; probably non-conventual; dubiously suggested Premonstratensian nuns; dissolved before 1594	The Holy Trinity ____________________; Killetrynode; Killyn Abbey; Killeen; Teampull na gCailmat; Templenagalliaghdoo; Teampall na gCailleach Dubh; (Church of the Black Veiled Nuns)
Kilmaine Monastery		Gaelic monks, purportedly founded in the 5th century by St. Patrick; became prebendal church of Tuam	Cell-medhon
Kilmore Monastery		early monastic site	Kilmore by Termoncarragh; Teampall na Cille More
Kilmore-Moy Monastery		early monastic site, probably founded in the 5th century	Cell-mor-ochtair-muaide; Cell-mor-muaide; Kilmormoyle
Kilnamanagh Friary ^{ø}		purported Franciscan Friars — evidence lacking Cell-na-manach	
Kilroe Monastery		early monastic site, founded c. 5th century	Cell-ro; Cell-roe-mor
		early monastic site, founded c. 7th century by St Lunecharia (Luineachair)	Cell-lunechuir; Killukin
Kilveny Friary ^{≈~}		purported Franciscan Friars — evidence lacking Kilreny; Kilkeny; Kilkenny	
Kinlough Monastery		early monastic site, founded c. 8th century	Ceann-lacha; Cenn-lacha
Knock Carmelite Monastery		Carmelite nuns	Monastery of the Nativity, Tranquilla, Knock
Knockor Friary ^{~}		foundation, order and dissolution unknown; granted to John Rawson 1594	Knocknor
Lia na Manach Monastery		early monastic site, possibly founded in the 5th century by St Patrick	Leac-fionnbaile; Lecc-finn
Mayo Abbey		early monastic site, Anglo-Saxon monks founded c. 671 by St Colman of Lindisfarne; supposed Benedictine monks — evidence lacking diocesan cathedral see transferred from Clogher 1152; see transferred to Clogher c. 1192; Augustinian Canons Regular secular college founded c. 1209; abbey status c. 1370, confirmed by the pope; dissolved after 1569; granted to John Rawson 1594; Benedictine 109	St Michael ____________________; Mageo; Magneo; Temple Gerald; Elitheria
Mayo Nunnery ^{≈}		nuns founded in the 7th century?	possibly Domnach Kerne or Domnach-ceirne
Meelick Monastery		early monastic site	Mil-eac
Moyne Abbey		possibly Franciscan Friars Minor, Conventual? founded before 24 March 1455 by Lord Mac William de Burgo, purportedly at the instance of Father Nehemias O'Donohue, (Note: Analecta Hibernica No.6, 6 November 1834, Irish Manuscript Commission, ii, p.158) or 1458 by Thomas de Burgo, MacWilliam (or by a Baret (Note: Analecta Hibernica No.6, 6 November 1834, Irish Manuscript Commission, i, p.51) or Barry (Note: Louis Augustin Alemand, Monasticum Hibernicum, translated and edited by John Stevens, 1722)); Observant Franciscan Friars reformed (or founded) 1455; (Note: Analecta Hibernica No.6, 6 November 1834, Irish Manuscript Commission, iii, p.199)-60; (Note: Canice Mooney, O.F.M., Terminus, 1954, p.247) dissolved 1590, burnt by Bingham; ruinous by 1595; granted to Edmund Barrett; friars remained until another house was built in the vicinity (see immediately below)	Maighin; Maigne; Magyn; Moyen; Muaidhe
Moyne Friary		Observant Franciscan Friars — from Moyne Abbey (see immediately above) founded 1618	
Murrisk Abbey		Augustinian Friars founded 1456, papal mandate for Hugh O'Malley, friar at Banada, to be licensed to build a monastery; Observant reformed 1458; dissolved 1578, friars expelled; granted to James Garvey; friars apparently later returned;	Leithearwmursge; Muirisce; Morasque; Morisk
Murrisk Friary ^{≈}	erroneously purported Franciscan Friars, Third Order Regular (Note: Canice Mooney, O.F.M., Terminus, 1956, p.141)		
Oughaval Monastery ^{#}		early monastic site, purportedly founded in the 6th century by St Colmcille (Note: Hubert Thomas Knox, Notes on the Early History of the Dioceses of Tuam, Killala and Achonry, 1904, pp.79,141,313)	Nuachongbhail
Partry Monastery		early monastic site, founded in the 6th century?, in the time of St Colmcille?	Obdacheara; Partraighe-ceara; Odbhacheara in Partragia
Rathfran Priory		Dominican Friars founded 1274, purportedly by a de Exeter (Note: James Ware, De Hibernia, et Antiquitatibus ejus, 1654 edition, p.223) (Dexter), possibly Steven de Exeter (Note: Hubert Thomas Knox, History of County Mayo, p.95) or Sir Richard de Exeter, (Note: J. Neary, Galway A.S. viii., p.19 and Lord Killanin and M. V. Duignan, Shell Guide to Ireland, 1962 (new edition 1967), p.328) or by a de Burgo, (Note: J. O'Heyne, O.P., Irish Dominicans (Epil. Chron...), (translated by A. Coleman, O.P., 1902), 1706) possibly William de Burgo; (Note: Tomas de Burgo, Hibernica Dominicana, 1762 edition) dissolved 1590, burned by Bingham's army; granted to William Taaffe 1596; (later history v. O'Heyne, Burgo, Coleman, RSAI and Mould)	Priory of the Holy Cross ____________________; Rathbran; Raithbrain; Rahrany
Rosserk Friary		Franciscan Friars, Third Order Regular founded before December 1441 dissolved c. 1578; lease granted to James Garvey; possibly later restored and dissolved 1590, burned by Bingham; granted to Edmond Barret 1595; suggested Observant Franciscan Friars (Note: J. Healy, The Catholic Encyclopedia, 1913-4, viii, p.641, refuted by Canice Mooney, O.F.M., communications) Ros-erc; Roisent; Rosserick	
St Derivla's Monastery		early monastic site, probably founded in the 6th century by St Dairbhile	
Shrule Monastery		early monastic site	Sruthair; Cloghuanaha
Strade Friary		Franciscan Friars Minor, Conventual founded c. 1240 (before 1252) by Jordan de Exeter, Lord of Athelthane or his son Stephen, at the bequest of the former's wife Basilia, daughter of Miler de Bermingham; Observant Franciscan Friars reform adopted unknown date dissolved 1252; Dominican Friars refounded 1252 or 1253; dissolved 1578?	The Holy Cross ____________________; Straide; Sraid; Ath-leathan; Ath-leayn; Ballylahan; Templemore
Turlough Abbey		early monastic site, possibly founded in the 5th century by St Patrick; probably ceased to be monastic long before church pillaged by Mac William 1236	Turlach
Urlaur Abbey		Dominican monks founded c. 1430 by the Angulo (Nagle) family (later assuming the name MacCostello), papal license granted 1434; dissolved 1612; granted to Sir Edward Fisher; later granted to Lord Dillon (Viscount Costello-Gallen), a Catholic, who permitted a community of friars; dissolved c. 1654	The Abbey Church of Saint Thomas, Urlaur ____________________; Urlare; Orlare; Orlare; Owrelare

Return to top of page

==== County Meath ====
(For references and location detail see List of monastic houses in County Meath)

Foundation	Image	Communities & Provenance	Formal Name or Dedication & Alternative Names
Ardbraccan Monastery		early monastic site	Arda-Breaain
Ardsallagh Monastery		early monastic site	Ard-Brendomnaich; Airdleac; Eascair-Branain
Argetbor Monastery		early monastic site, Patrician monks	
Athboy Friary ^{=+}		Carmelite Friars founded 1317, license to grant land granted 17 October 1317; dissolved 1539; occupied by farmer Thomas Casey 1540; not in the list of restored convents c.1737; site now occupied by C.I. parish church	Athbuidhe; Aboy; Beallabuy
Ballyboggan Priory		Augustinian Canons Regular founded before 1200?, supposedly by Jordan Comin; dissolved 1537, surrendered by Prior Thomas Bermingham 15 October 1537; church found to be parochial by 1540; granted to Sir William Bermingham, Baron of Carbrie, 1541	Thoe Holy Trinity ____________________; Baile-ua-bhogain; Balibagan; de Laude Dei
Bective Abbey		Cistercian monks — from Mellifont founded 1147 by Murchad O Melaghlin, King of Meath, colonized 14 January 1147; dissolved 6 May 1536; held by John Alen, Lord Chancellor; granted to Andrew Wyse, vice-treasurer c.1552; Alexander Fitton also given as grantee; Bartholomew Dillon given as assignee; (Note: Harris's Table. Ware-Harris, Antiquities, 1745) (NM)	Beatidudo Dei; Becco Dei; Bectiffe; Brime; Lie-trede
Beybeg Cell		Cistercian monks — from Beaubec, France founded before 1216, manor granted by Walter de Lacy to the monks of St Mary and St Laurence de Bellow Becco, confirmed by Henry III; mistaken reference to Benedictines; (Note: James Ware, De Hibernia, et Antiquitatibus ejus, 1654 edition) dissolved 1332, granted to Furness by license 1332; granted to Thomas Cusak 1560 Beaubec; Bebeke; de Bello Loco	
Calliaghstown Priory		Augustinian nuns — Arroasian — from Duleek? dependent on Clonard-Odder; founded after 1195?, church confirmed to the nuns of Clonard 1195; church possibly shared by canons and canonesses possibly from c.1144 (in the time of St Malachy); dissolved before 1500?, probably abandoned before 1500	St Mary ____________________; Callystown
Castlekeeran Monastery		early monastic site, founded 8th century by St Ciaran; plundered by Norsmen 949; burned by MacMurrough 1170	Caislen-Ciaran; Belach-duin
Clonard Abbey		early monastic site, founded c.520 by St Finnian; diocesan cathedral 1111; translated to Trim 1202; Augustinian Canons Regular — Arroasian founded before 1146 (probably 1144); dissolved 1202?;	St Peter
Clonard Abbey		Augustinian Canonesses — Arroasian founded 1144 by Murchad O'Melaghlin, ruler of Meath, at the instance of St Malachy; cell, dependent on Odder from before 1384; dissolved before 1535?, possibly abandoned before 1535; leased to Gerald FitzGerald 1540	St Mary ____________________; Cluain-Iraird
Clonard Priory		Augustinian Canons Regular — probably from St Thomas's, Dublin founded c.1183 (between 1183 and 1186) by Hugh de Lacy; cathedral priory; dissolved 1202?	St John
Clonard Abbey		Augustinian Canons Regular founded 1202?, St Peter's Abbey and St John's Priory united; dissolved 1540	SS Peter and John
Clonguffin Monastery		early monastic site, nuns, founded before 760 by St Fintana?	Cluain-cuibhtin; Cluain-cuifthin
Collumbus Monastery ^{≈}		early monastic site possibly located in County Meath	
Colp Cell		Augustinian Canons Regular — Arroasian dependent on Llanthony Prima; founded after 1183? by Hugh de Lacy; dissolved 1540; granted to Henry Draycott 1559	Colps; Culpe
Courtown Friary		Franciscan Friars (Note: A. Cogan, The Diocese of Meath 1862-70, i, pp.211-2)	
Dall Bronig Monastery ^{~}		early monastic site, founded 5th century? (Note: J. Ryan, S.J., Irish Monasticism, Origins and Development, 1931, p.78 gives a bishop at Dall Bronig in the time of St Patrick)	
Disert-moholmoc Monastery ^{~≈}		early monastic site, possibly located in County Meath	possibly Staholmog, infra
Diore-mac-Aidmecain Monastery ^{~}		early monastic site, nuns, founded 6th century (in the time of St Finnian of Clonard)	St Lassara the virgin ____________________; Dairemacnaidmecain
Donacarney Monastery		nuns, ruins purportedly a nunnery (Note: Mervyn Archdall, Monasticon Hibernicum, 1786, p.529)	Domnach-cairne; Donnygarney
Donaghmore Monastery		early monastic site, founded 5th century by St Patrick for Cruimthir Cassan (St Cassanus), reputedly Patrick's first foundation in Ireland; erenaghs up to late 11th century; church became parochial after 1171; remains of later church and round tower on site	Domnach-mor-maige-echnach; Domnach-torten; Bile-torten
Donaghpatrick Monastery		early monastic site, founded 5th century by St Patrick, land granted by Conall mac Niall; burned 750; raided a number of times by the Norsemen; plundered by Dermot MacMurrough 1156; church became parochial after 1171; site now occupied by St Patrick's C.I. church	Domnach-patraice; Donogh-patrick
Donaghseery Monastery ^{~}		early monastic site, founded 5th century (in the time of St Patrick)	Domnach-sairigi
Donor Friary, ^{~} Killaconnigan parish		Dominican Friars founded by 1636	
Druim-corcortri Monastery		early monastic site, founded 5th century by St Patrick for Diarmait	
Druimfinchoil Monastery ^{~}		early monastic site, founded by Columb and Lugad	
Druimmacubla Monastery ^{~}		early monastic site, founded 5th century (in the time of St Patrick)?	Druim-maccu-blai
Dulane Monastery		early monastic site, founded 5th century?; plundered by the Norsemen 886; plundered by MacMurrough and his knights 1170; church became parochial after 1171	Tuilean; Tuileim; Tulleean
Duleek Monastery		early monastic site, founded before 489 by St Cianan; diocesan cathedral 1111; merged to Meath after 1152?	Dam-liac; Doimliag
Duleek, St Mary's Abbey ^{=+}		Augustinian Canons Regular — Arroasian priory founded after 1140 by O'Kelly, probably Muircertach O'Kelly, King of Bregha; probably double monastery Augustinian Canons Regular and nuns — Arroasian dependent on Clonard; founded after 1144; church confirmed to the nuns of Clonard 1195; dissolved after 1195, nuns probably transferred to Calliaghstown; raised to abbey status c.1290; dissolved 1537; granted to Edward Becke for 21 years 28 January 1548; lease passed to John Parker 1564; remains incorporatated into C.I. parish church built on site	Dam-liac; Doimliag
Duleek, St Michael's Priory		Augustinian Canons Regular dependent on Llanthony Secunda; founded c. 1180 by Hugh de Lacy; dissolved before 1538?; rented by Thomas Cusak and others	St Michael ____________________; Cell of St Cianan
Duleek Hospitallers		Knights Hospitaller frankhouse	
Dunboyne Cell		Augustinian Canons Regular dependent on Mullingar; founded after 1230?; dissolved after 1350	Dun-buinne
Dunshaughlin Monastery		early monastic site, founded 5th century by Senchall (St Secundus)	Domnach-sechnaill
Emlagh Monastery		early monastic site, probably founded by a St Beccan (though not Beccan of Cluiain-ard); church becoming parochial after 1171	Imleach-Beccain; Imblech-fia
Feart-Cearbain Monastery ^{~}		early monastic site	Ferta-cerbain; Ferta-cherpain
Fennor Monastery		early monastic site, founded by St Nectan?	Finnabair-abha; Finnabrach
Gormanston Friary *		Franciscan Friars; founded 1947; opened as a secondary school 1954; in use as a Franciscan college; extant	
Indeidnen Monastery		early monastic site, founded before 849; erenaghs into 11th century	Indenen; Inan
Inishmot Monastery		early monastic site, founded 6th century by St Mochta	Inis-mochta
Kells Monastery		early monastic site purportedly founded 6th century by St Colmcille — evidence lacking founded by c.804; diocesan cathedral 1152; merged with Meath c.1211; becoming a parochial church secular college, perpetual chantry in the church; dissolved 1549	
Kells Abbey		Augustinian Canons Regular — Arroasian founded after 1140 (1140-8), at the instance of St Malachy; Augustinian nuns — Arroasian founded after 1144, confirmed to the nuns of Clonard; (possibly a double monastery) nuns probably transferred to Calliaghstown 1195; destroyed by the Anglo-Normans 1176, who proceeded to build a castle, destroyed later that year; apparently refounded by Hugh de Lacy; dissolved 11 November 1539, surrendered by Abbot Richard Plunkett; granted to Sir Gerald Fleminge 1541	St Mary _____________________; Ceanannus-mor; Cenandas; Kenan; kenlis
Kells Priory ^{≈}		purported Knights Hospitaller — probable confusion with Crutched Friars' house (see immediately below)	St John
Kells Priory Hospital		Crutched Friars founded before 1199 (during the reign of Richard I) by Walter de Lacy, Lord of Meath; (erroneously attributed as Trinitarians) dissolved 1539; granted to Richard Slayne 1566	St John the Baptist
Kilbrew Monastery		early monastic site, founded by 7th century; possibly dissolved after 1018 when many were slain	Cell-fobrich; Cell-foirbrich
Kilbride Priory		Augustinian nuns — Arroasian priory? dependent on Trim; founded after 1144, confirmed to nuns of Clonard 1195; probably dissolved sometime after 1310	St Brigid ____________________; Trim, St Brigid
Kildalkey Monastery		early monastic site, founded by St Mo-Luog; burned 779; extant 888	Cell-deilge; Cell-delga
Kilglin Monastery		early monastic site, founded 5th century by St Patrick; extant 842	Celldumagluinn; Kildumhagloinn
Killabban Monastery ^{~}		early monastic site founded 6th century by St Abban	Cell-abbain
Killaconnigan Friary ^{≈}		Dominican Friars?	possibly Donore (supra)
Killaine Monastery ^{~}		early monastic site, nuns; founded by St Enda for his sister Fanchea	Cell-aine
Killalga Monastery ^{~}		early monastic site, supposedly located in County Meath (Note: Mervyn Archdall, Monasticon Hibernicum, 1786, p.399 gives Killalga as County Offaly)	Cell-elge; Cell-elga
Kilmainhambeg Preceptory		Knights Hospitaller founded before 1199 (during the reign of Richard I) by Walter de Lacy, Lord of Meath; dissolved 1499; ruinous by 1588; leased to Sir Patrick Barnewell (renewed 1585 and 1590)	Kilmaynanbeg
Kilmainham Wood Preceptory		Knights Hospitaller purportedly founded after 1212 by the Prestons; probably farmed out 14th century; dissolved before 1500?; lease granted to Callough O'More	Kilmainhamwood Commandery; Kylmaynanwood; Kilmaynanwood
Kilmoon Monastery		early monastic site, probably founded 6th century (in the time of St Brendan of Clonfert) by St Moinne (Munni), a Briton; extant 885	St Moinne ___________________; Cell-monai; Cell-moinne
Kilshine Monastery		early monastic site, nuns founded before 597? by St Abban for St Segnich (Sinchea)	Cell-ailbe; Cell-sinche; Techsinche
Kilskeer Monastery		early monastic site, monks and nuns?; possible double monastery; founded 6th century (in the time of St Colmcille) by Schiria; possibly monks only from 8th century	Cell-scire; Killskyre
Leckno Monastery		early monastic site, founded by 750	Lecknagh; Leckne; possibly Piercetown
Lismullin Priory		Augustinian nuns founded c.1240 by Avicia de la Corner (Avice de Lacortier, widow), sister of Richard, Bishop of Meath, who granted the church and manors; dissolved 1539; granted to Sir Thomas Cusack 1547	The Holy Trinity ____________________; Las-mullen; Les-mullen; Lois-mullen; Kilmullan
Lough Sheelin Monastery		early monastic site, founded possibly 6th century by St Carthag, bishop	Inisvachtuir; Inisuachtair; Church Island
Lough Sheelin Friary		Friars, possible place of refuge during the reign of Queen Elizabeth	
Mornington Monastery		early monastic site, founded 6th century by St Colmcille	Baile-mernain; Villa Maris; Marinerstown
Navan Abbey		Augustinian Canons Regular — Arroasian founded before 1170?, probably on site of earlier monastery (see immediately below), church confirmed to the canons by John de Courcy; surrendered 19 July 1538 by Abbot Thomas Waffe; dissolved 1539; church in parochial use by 1540; occupancy by John Brokes 1540-1	St Mary ____________________; An Uaim; Nuachongbail; Novbain; Uaim
Navan Monastery		early monastic site, founded 6th century; Augustinian Canons house probably founded on site (see immediately above)	St Mary ____________________; An Uaim; Nuachongbail; Novbain; Uaim
Newtown Trim Cathedral Priory		Augustinian Canons Regular — Victorine — possibly from St Thomas's Abbey, Dublin founded 1202 by Simon Rochfort, Bishop of Meath, who translated the see here from Clonard; dissolved 1536, suppressed 1 May 1536	SS Peter and Paul
Newtown Trim Priory Hospital		Crutched Friars founded after 1206?, possibly by the Bishop of Meath; dissolved 1539; occupier Sir Thomas Cusake 1540-2	The Priory Hospital of St John the Baptist
Odder Priory		dedication infers early monastic site, nuns Augustinian nuns — Arroasian priory founded c.1144?, confirmed to the nuns of Clonard by Pope Celestine III 1195; raised to abbey status c.1383; dissolved 1539; church parochial by 1540; under occupancy of Nicholas Stanyhurst 1540; leased to James Stanihurst 1557	St Brigid ____________________; Odra
Oristown Monastery		early monastic site, cella founded by St Finbar of Cork, site granted by a local chieftain	Raith-airthir
Piercetown Monastery ^{≈}		early monastic site	Leckno; Lecknagh; Leckne; Pyerston Laundy
Rathaige Monastery ^{≈}		early monastic site, possibly located in County Meath	Raithaidme
Rath-becain Monastery ^{~}		early monastic site, founded by St Abban; possibly located in County Meath	Rathbeggan; Rathbeg
Rathmore Abbey ^{ø}		"Abbey" (Note: Ordnance Survey, ½ inch, and Memorial Atlas of Ireland, 1901) not a monastic church, apparently parochial	Ballyboy
Rathossain Monastery		early monastic site, founded before 686 by St Ossain	Rathosain
Ratoath Abbey		Augustinian Canons Regular cell? dependent on St Thomas's Abbey, Dublin?, possibly a hospital maintained by the canons; founded before c.1300?; dissolved after 1456	St Mary Magdalene ____________________; Rath-outhe; Ratouth
Russagh Monastery ^{~}		early monastic site, founded by St Caeman (Coeman) Brec	Ros-eac; Ros-each; Clonabreny
Silverstream Priory		Benedictine Monks founded 2012 by Dom Mark Daniel Kirby	Monastery of Our Lady of the Cenacle
Skreen Monastery		early monastic site founded before late 9th century; plundered 974 and 986; plundered by the foreigners from Dublin 1037; plundered by the men of Teathbha 1058; plundered by the Ui Briuin 1152; granted to St Mary's Abbey, Dublin 1185-6	Scrin-coluim-cille; Scrinium; Shrine; Skryne; Acall; Achall
Skreen Friary ^{#}, nr. Tara		Augustinian Friars founded 1341, 99-year lease of land granted by Lord Francis de Feipo; dissolved 1539; granted to Thomas Cusack 1542; (NM)	Hill of Skreen Monastery
Skreen Priory		Augustinian nuns — Arroasian dependent on Clonard founded after 1144; confirmed to the nuns of Clonard 1195; dissolved before 1240?, probably abandoned before the founding of Lismullin; passed to Odder late 14th century	St Mary
Slane Monastery		early monastic site, founded by St Patrick; hermitage attributed to St Erc; plundered by the Norsemen 833; probably dissolved before 1170; plundered 1156, 1161 and 1170	Slaine; Slainge; Ferta-fer-feac
Slane Friary		Franciscan Friars, Third Order Regular founded before 31 August 1512, license obtained by Christopher Fleming, Baron of Slane, and his wife Elizabeth Stuckly for the hermitage of St Erc to be granted in perpetuity to Franciscans Father Malachy O'Bryen and Brother Donagh O'Bryen who were resident there; dissolved 1540, before 1548; granted to Sir James Fleming 12 November 1543; granted to James, Lord of Slayne 1546; occupied by James Fleming 1548; priests and prelates continued in residency after suppression; Capuchin Franciscan Friars founded 1641; dissolved 1650; (NM)	Slaine; Slainge; Ferta-fer-feac
Staholmog Monastery		early monastic site, founded 6th century by St Colman (Note: listed in Harris's Table in Ware-Harris, Antiquities, 1745, p.264)	Disert-Moholmoc; Tech-Moholmog
Tara Monastery		early monastic site, founded before 504, possibly by St Partick for Cerpan, a convert of his, later bishop here	Fert-cherpain at Temuir
Tara Hospice		Knights Hospitaller founded by 1212: church confirmed to the knights; hospice extant 1331	Cardomiston
Teltown Monastery		early monastic site, founded before 723	Tailltui; Cell-talten; Cell-tailtean; Kiltalton
Trevet Monastery		early monastic site, founded before 563, probably by St Colmcille; burned by Donnechadh O Caroroll 1145; plundered by the Ui Briuin 1152	Treoit; Treod; Trefoit; Tryvet
Trim Abbey		early monastic site, founded 5th century by St Patrick, site granted by Feidlimid, son of Loiguire; diocesan cathedral 1202; early monastic site, nuns 407 later? Kilbride? Augustinian Canons Regular founded after 1140; probably Augustinian Canons Regular — Arroasian probably adopted 1144 at the instance of St Malachy; burned 1108 by Conor O'Melaghlin; destroyed before 1186; restored/rebuilt by de Lacy (probably Hugh de Lacy) before 1188-91; burnt 1203; dissolved 1539; granted to Sir Anthony Leger, the king's deputy, 1542; converted into a Protestant school 18th century; (NM)	The Abbey Church of Saint Mary, Trim ____________________; Talbot Castle
Trim Blackfriars		Dominican Friars founded 1263, probably by Geoffrey de Geneville, Lord of Meath, later friar and buried here, or by Hussey, Baron of Galtrim, benefactor and buried here; dissolved 1540; occupied by David Flody, farmer, 1548 friars remained in the district, acquiring a new house at Donor, supra, by 1636	St Mary
Trim Friary ^{#}		Franciscan Friars Minor, Conventual founded before 1282?, possibly by William, Rufus de Burgo or the Plunkets, hospital possibly granted to the friars; Observant Franciscan Friars reformed not later than 1506; dissolved 1540; granted to three persons 1542; occupied by John Hamond 1548; convent recommended for restoration 1544; suppressed by the Protestants and converted into a court house; abandoned until another house built 1609	St Bonavente or St Francis
Trim Crutched Friars ^{~}	duplication of Newtown Trim Crutched Friary, supra (Note: Mervyn Archdall, Monasticon Hibernicum 1786, p.581)		
Trim Carmelite Friars		given in Rinuccini list - evidence lacking	
Tullyard Monastery ^{~}		early monastic site, collapse of round tower c.1760 (Note: E. Hogan, S.J., Goedelicum locorum et tribuum Hiberniae et Scotiae, R.I.A., 1910, p.627)	Tullaghard
Villa Britone ^{~≈?}		given in taxation of 1302-6 — yet to be identified - foundation, order and period unknown	Villa Bruton

Return to top of page

==== County Monaghan ====
(For references and location detail see List of monastic houses in County Monaghan)

Foundation	Image	Communities & Provenance	Formal Name or Dedication & Alternative Names
Carrickmacross Monastery		early monastic site, founded before 845	Cell-rois; Feara-rois
Clochensis Friary ^{~≈?}		Augustinian Friars possibly Clones former house of Augustinian Canons (see immediately below)	Clockensis; Clochensis in Connacht; Clones
Clones Abbey		early monastic site, Gaelic monks, founded before 549/50 by St Tigernach; Augustinian Canons Regular founded after 1140? Augustinian Canons Regular — Arroasian? reformed c.1144?; dissolved after 1586?; granted to Sir Henry Duke possibly later Augustinian Friars (if Clokensis (see immediately above))	SS Peter and Paul; St Tighernach ____________________ 'St Tierney' ; Wee Abbey; Cluain-eois; Cluan-auis; Clunes; Cluniscense; Clokensis?
Clontibret Monastery		early monastic site, Gaelic nuns, patronised by St Colman; termon land 1591	Cluain-tiprat
Connabury Monastery		early monastic site, Gaelic nuns, founded before 740	Gort-chonaigh
Donagh Monastery		early monastic site, Gaelic monks; erenagh 1542	Domnachmaighe-da-chlaoine; Dumthomuach
Donaghmoyne Monastery		early monastic site, founded by St Patrick; plundered by Norsemen 832	Domnach-maigen
Drumsnat Monastery		early monastic site, patronised by St Molua	Druim-snechta
Errigal Trough Monastery		early monastic site, Gaelic monks	Airecal-muadain
Inniskeen Monastery		early monastic site, founded before 587; burned 789; plundered 948; possibly not surviving after 10th century; burned 1166	Inis-cain-dega; Inis-kin; Innishkeen
Killeevan Abbey ^{~ø}		supposed monastic site — order and period unknown; remains of "Abbey" church — possibly legendary	
Kilmore Monastery ^{~}		early monastic site burned 749	St Aedan ____________________; Cell-mor of Aedan
Loughbawn Abbey		purported "Abbey" site	
Monaghan Friary ^{=}		Franciscan Friars Minor, Conventual founded 1462 (during the reign of Feidhlimidh Mac Mathgamna (Phelim MacMahon), King of Oriel) on the site of the early monastery (see immediately below); Observant Franciscan Friars reformed 1567; dissolved 1588-9, destroyed by the English 1589; granted to Edward Withe; fortified mansion built from the friary masonry by Lord Edward Blarney	Muinechan; Muineachan; Mounechan; Munichane
Monaghan Monastery		early monastic site (Note: Mervyn Archdall, Monasticon Hibernicum, 1786, references up to 1186 erroneously refer to Monoghan for Mucnamh (Muckno)); Franciscan friary built on site 1462 (see immediately above)	Muinechan; Muineachan; Mounechan; Munichane
Muckno Monastery		early monastic site, Gaelic monks; plundered by the Ulidians 1110; claimed by Augustinian Friars 17th to 19th century	Mucnamh; Muck Naimh; Mucshnamh; Muckna; Muckne
Tehellan Monastery		early monastic site, Gaelic monks founded 5th century by St Patrick	Tech-talan; Tech-talain; Tyhallan; Tyholland
Tedavnet Monastery		early monastic site, Gaelic nuns founded 6th century by St Damhnat	Tech-damnata; Tydavnet
Tullycorbet Monastery		early monastic site	Tullach-carpait

The following location in County Monaghan lacks monastic connection:

- Clones 'Abbey': a ruined non-monastic church (NM)

Return to top of page

==== County Offaly ====
(For references and location detail see List of monastic houses in County Offaly)

Foundation	Image	Communities & Provenance	Formal Name or Dedication & Alternative Names
Banagher Monastery		early monastic site; church of St Mary built on site, now ruined	Bennchore
Birr Monastery ^{#}		early monastic site, founded before 573 by St Brendan of Birr; plundered by the men of Dublin 842; burned 1167	Biorra; Birra; Biror; Parsonstown
Clareen Monastery		founded 6th century	St Kieran; Seir Kieran
Cloghan Friary ^{~}		Franciscan Friars purportedly founded c.1595 by the Lord Deputy, Sir William Russell, who took Cloghan Castle from O'Madden (Note: Cassell, Gazetteer of Great Britain and Ireland ii, p.52) — dubious	
Clonmacnoise Cathedral and Monastery		early monastic site; diocesan cathedral 1111; Augustinian Canons Regular founded after 1140; Augustinian Canons Regular — Arroasian? refounded? c.1144; dissolved c.1268; secular college founded 1459;; dissolved 1568	Cluain-maccu-nois; Cluain-mic-nois; Cluan; Tipraic, with Eaglais-beaag
Clonmacnoise Abbey		Augustinian Canons Regular — Arroasian? founded 12th century separate from the cathedral (see immediately above); dissolution date unknown — later abbots (up to 1384) may have been titular	
Clonmacnoise Abbey (nuns)		early monastic site, nuns founded before 1026; Augustinian nuns — Arroasian; dependent on Clonard; refounded c.1144? by Devorghilla, daughter of Murchad O Melaghlin; St Mary's church rebuilt dependent on Kilcreevanty 1223; dissolved after 1500?	St Mary ____________________; Kelbygmieth; Kellogainechan; Riaghtalta Kailleach
Clonsast Monastery		early monastic site, founded late 7th century by St Bearchan (Note: O. S. Muirthuile, Tullamore Official Guide, p.16; E. Hogan, Onomasticon Goedelicum, R.I.A., 1910 p.270)	Cluain-Sasta
Cluain-an-dobhair ^{~}		early monastic site, not yet identified, possibly located in County Offaly	
Cluain-dachrann Monastery ^{~}		possible chapel or cell of Rahan, possibly founded by St Carthag	erroneously Clonrane, (Note: Mervyn Archdall, Monasticon Hibernicum, 1786, p.708) County Westmeath
Craebheach Monastery ^{~}		early monastic site, possibly founded c.450 by St Trian, disciple of St Patrick possibly located in County Offaly, site near the River Brosna, possibly near Clonmacnois	Croebheach; Craibheach
Croghan Monastery		early monastic site, founded before 490/492	Cruachan Bri Eli
Drumcullen Monastery ^{~}		early monastic site, founded before 591, also given located in County Westmeath (Note: Harris's Table, Ware-Harris, Antiquities, 1745, p.264 and Mervyn Archdall, Monasticon Hibernicum, 1786, p.709)	Druim-cuilinn
Durrow Abbey		early monastic site, founded 556 or 565 by St Colmcille, site granted by Aedh mac Brendain, King of Tethba; burned 1095; Augustinian Canons Regular — Arroasian probable double monastery with Durrow Priory (see immediately below); founded after 1144? by Murchad O'Melaghlin, possibly at the instance of St Malachy; burned 1153; burned twice 1155; destroyed by the Anglo-Normans 1175; founded after; 310,317	St Mary ____________________; Dermag-coluim-cille; Diarmag-coluim-cille; Durmag-coluim-cille; Dorro; Dower; Deevo? (sic. County Westmeath)
Durrow Priory ^{#}		Augustinian nuns — Arroasian dependent on Clonard; probable double monastery with Durrow Abbey (see immediately above); founded after 1144? by Murchad O'Melaghlin, possibly at the instance of St Malachy; dissolved after 1195?, granted to the nuns of Clonard; nuns probably transferred to Killeigh after 1195	St Mary
Gageborough Priory		nuns (order unknown) founded 13th century? by Matilda de Lacy; dissolution unknonwn	
Gallen Priory		founded 5th century by St Canoc; Augustinian Canons Regular founded c.1140-8; Augustinian Canons Regular — Arroasian? possibly adopted at the instance of St Malachy; ruined 1519; plundered 1531 and 1548; probably dissolved before/c. 1585; granted to Sir Gerald More 1612; reoccupied after 1620 probably refounded by the MacCoghlans, benefactors	Gallimh; Galeang; Galin; Galynn; Glinnensis
Kilbian Monastery ^{≈}		early monastic site, founded 583, (Note: Conry) possibly by St Abban, (Note: Mervyn Archdall, Monasticon Hibernicum, 1786, p398) possibly located in County Offaly	Kilmbian?
Kilcolgan Monastery		early monastic site, founded by St Colgan son of Kellach	Cell-colgain
Kilcolman Monastery		early monastic site, founded by St Colman Niger (possibly Colman of Duir-mor)	Cell-colmain; Insula Vitae (Note: Ordnance Survey)
Kilcomin Monastery		early monastic site, founded before 669	Cell-cumain; Disert Chuimin
Kilcormac Friary		Carmelite Friars founded 1406 by Odo (Hugh), son of Nellan Mulloy, buried here; dissolved before 1579?; granted to George Cowley 1579; granted to Robert Leicester, probably after 1599	St Mary ____________________; Cell-chormaic; Kil-carmic; Kil-marmick; Frankford
Killagally Monastery ^{≈}		early monastic site	Kilalga? (County Meath)
Killeigh Priory ^{+=}		early monastic site abbey founded before 549 by St Sinchell, son of Cenandan; Augustinian Canons Regular dependent on Durrow; priory founded after 1144?; Augustinian Canons Regular — Arroasian probably adopted before 1148 or after 1163; dissolved c.1569; granted to John Lee 1576; temporal possessions granted to Gerald, Earl of Kildare 1578; church became parochial; remains incorporated into C.I. parish church	The Holy Cross (Note: James Ware, De Hibernia, et Antiquitatibus ejus, 1654 edition); St Mary (15th century)
Killeigh Priory (nuns) ^{#}		Augustinian Canonesses — Arroasian? founded after 1195?; dissolved c.1569?	
Killeigh Friary		Franciscan Friars Minor, Conventual founded 1293? (before 1303) by Edward I; dissolved c.1598, buildings destroyed c.1598; granted to John Allee, friars apparently remained in the area Observant Franciscan Friars adopted 1632	
Killyon Monastery		early monastic site, nuns founded 5th century (after the death of his father) by St Ciaran for his mother, Liedania	Cell-liadain; Kil-liadhuin
Kilmeelchon Monastery		early monastic site, founded 5th century by St Gussacht mac Milchon; extant 883	Cell-mic-milchon
Kinnitty Monastery ^{#}		early monastic site, possibly founded by 557; plundered by Norsemen 842; site possibly marked by a High cross within a churchyard	
Lemanaghan Monastery		early monastic site, founded c.645-6 by St Managhan?, land granted to the community at Clonmacnoise; extant 893; apparently extant 1205	St Managhan ____________________; Leith-manchain; Liath-manchain; Manchan Leith; Tuaim nEirc
Lusmagh Monastery		early monastic site, founded 7th century by St Cronan	Herbosus Campus
Lusmagh Friary ^{≈ø}		Franciscan Friars — possibly never established	Clochincantualaig?
Lynally Monastery ^{#}		Columban monks founded c.590 by St Colman Elo; burned by Dohmnall mac Murchadh 970	Lann-Elo; Lann-Eala; Linnalli; Lynnealla
Monasteroris Friary		Franciscan Friars Minor, Conventual founded 1325 by John de Bermingham, Earl of Louth; Observant Franciscan Friars adopted before 1507; dissolved after 1542; granted to Nicholas Herbert before 1587	Feoruis; Macfeorais; Mainister-oras; Moitot; Mortoto; Thetmoy; Totmoy; Tuaith-maigh
Roscrea — Mount St Joseph's Abbey *		Cistercian monks — Trappist — from Mount Melleray Abbey, County Waterford founded 1878; extant	
Rahan Monastery		early monastic site, monks founded c.590-635, purportedly by Camelacus, Patrician bishop; great monastery founded by St Carthach (Mochuda); suggested (Note: Journal, Royal Society of Antiquaries of Ireland, xxvi. p.317) Augustinian Canons Regular briefly, possibly after 1171 — improbable and documentary evidence lacking	St Carthach ____________________; Raihen; Rath-an; Rath-enin; Rath-yne
Rathlihen Monastery		early monastic site, founded before c.540 by St Illand	Rathlipthen; Rathlibthen
Reynagh Monastery		early monastic site, nuns	Cell-rignaighe; Kill-rignaighe; suggested Kilrane, (Note: E. Hogan, S. J., Onomasticon Goedelicum, R.I.A., 1910, p.210) County Wexford
Seirkieran Priory		early monastic site, founded 5th century by St Ciaran; Augustinian Canons Regular founded before c.1170; dissolved 1568, surrendered 27 December 1568	St Ciaran; St Mary ____________________; Saiger Chiarain; Saegir-Querayn; St Keranus de Sayr; Kieran de Sayr; Sayrkeran; Syrkyeran
Tihelly Monastery ^{#}		early monastic site founded 5th century; burned 670;	Tihilly; Tech-telle; Tech-taille; Tehelly; Templekieran

Return to top of page

==== County Roscommon ====
(For references and location detail see List of monastic houses in County Roscommon)

Foundation	Image	Communities & Provenance	Formal Name or Dedication & Alternative Names
Ardcarn Priory		early monastic site, founded in the 6th century; diocesan cathedral; Augustinian Canons Regular — Arroasian? founded after 1144?; church possibly shared by Canons and nuns (see immediately below); dissolved c.1593?; granted to the provost and fellows of Holy Trinity Dublin	Ard-carna; Ard-charna
Ardcarn Priory		Augustinian nuns — Arroasian? founded after 1144, possibly by St Malachy; dependent on Kilcreevanty from before 1223; church possibly shared by Canons (see immediately above) and nuns; dissolved c.1590?; granted to Terence (Tirlaughe O'Byrne) 1595;	St Mary
Ardcarn Friary ^{¤}	recorded as Franciscan Friars — no monastic house; Friars of Knockvicar owned land in the parish		
Ardsenlis Monastery ^{~≈}		early monastic site, nuns founded in the 5th century by St Patrick; possibly located in County Roscommon	Senlis?
Assylin Monastery		early monastic site, founded probably before 563 by St Colmcille; often mistaken for Inshmacnerin	Eas-mac-n-Eirc; Eas-ui-fhloinn
Athleague Priory		Augustinian Canons Regular — Arroasian probable cell, dependent on Roscommon; founded before 1266; dissolved before 1466, vicarage granted to the prior of Rindown	Athliag-maenagain; Aghliag
Baslick Monastery		early monastic site, probably founded in the 5th century (in the time of St Patrick); plundered by Norsemen 846	Baisleac-mor; Basleac
Bellaneeny Friary		Camelite Friars dependent on Eglish; founded after c.1437; dissolved c.1567, possibly abandoned by the Carmelites; leased to Edmund O'Fallon of Athlone 1575; Franciscan Friars? possibly in occupation in the 16th century (during the reign of Elizabeth I)	Baleanany; Bealaneny; Belathnaony
Bettyfield Abbey ^{ø}		probably a secular chapel	Shankill
Boyle Abbey		early monastic site, possibly founded in the 5th century, possibly by St Patrick; sometimes confused with Ath-da-larc, County Meath; Cistercian monks — from Buniffi (community founded from Grelachdinach 16 August 1148 by Abbot Peter O'Mordha) founded 1161; affiliated to Clairvaux 1228; dissolved c.1589; granted to Patrick Dusacke of Gerrardston; (NM)	Ath-da-Larc; Ath-da-laarcc; Ath-da-laragh; Buell; Buill; Mainister-na-buill
Boyle Nunnery		nuns, "ruined nunnery" (Note: Ordnance Survey) possibly historically located in County Sligo	
Caldragh Friary		Franciscan Friars, Third Order Regular founded before 1487?; dissolved 1582?; leased to Bryan M'Dermot 1582; granted to Thomas Danby (Note: Harris's Table, Ware-Harris, Antiquities, 1745)	Caldrywolagh; Caldra; Ceall-braughe-uallaighe
Caldragh Nunnery		nuns "nunnery in ruins" (Note: Ordnance Survey)	
Cam Monastery		early monastic site, nuns	Camma; Camach
Cloonard Abbey ^{ø} (Tibohine parish)		"Cloonard abbey and church" (Note: Memorial Atlas of Ireland, 1901)	
Cloonburren Monastery		early monastic site, nuns founded before 577-8 by Cairech Dergen; probably dissolved before 1167	Cluain-bronaigh; Clooncagh
Clooncraff Monastery		early monastic site, founded before 752; plundered 815	Cluain-crema; Cluain cremtha
Cloonoghil Cell		Augustinian nuns — Arroasian dependent on Kilcreevanty; founded before 1223, confirmed to the nuns of Kilcreevanty c.1223 and 1400; dissolved c.1543?	St Mary ____________________; Cluain-eochaill; Cluain-ockill
Cloonowen Monastery		early monastic site, possibly founded in the 6th century; plundered by the Munster men 1089	Cluain-emhain; Cluain-emuin
Clonrahan Friary ^{~}		Franciscan Friars, Third Order Regular founded after 1485 by Cathal O'Conor Roe (Rufus); dissolved (during the reign of Elizabeth I)	Cloon-rane; Cloon-sreane; Cloon-rohan
Cloonshanville Priory, near Frenchpark		early monastic site, founded in the 5th century? (by the time of St Patrick); Dominican Friars founded 1385 by Mac Dermot Roe (Rufus); priory leased to Hugh boy O'Donnell 1577; lands leased to the mayor of Galway 1578; friary leased to Bryan Mac Dermot 1580; dissolved before 1596; leased to William Taaffe of Sligo 1596; friary later owned by Lord Dillan and rented by a Protestant named Davis	The Holy Cross ____________________; Cluain-sainmhill; Cluain-senmall; Cluain-maoil
Cloontuskert Priory		early monastic site, founded in the 6th century by St Faithlinn; Augustinian Canons Regular — Arroasian founded after 1140, probably by an O'Conor - possibly Turlough O'Conor; dissolved 1563?; granted to Fryall O'Farrell	Cluain-tuaiscirt-na-dina
Creeve Monastery		early monastic site, founded in the early 6th century? by St Finnian of Clonard	Craebh-ghrellain; Craebh-mor
Deerane Abbey		Augustinian Canons Regular — Arroasian — from Roscommon founded before 1156?, site granted by O'Conor; double monastery with nuns' priory (see immediately below) until 1223-4; dissolved c.1578?; Augustinian Friars	St Mary ____________________; Dhoran; Daren; Deerane; Derreen; Doren; Dorhan
Deerane Priory		Augustinian nuns — Arroasian double monastery with Canons' abbey (see immediately above) founded after 1144; dependent on Kilcreevanty from before 1223; dissolved after 1223-4	
Domnach-mor Monastery ^{≈~}		early monastic site, possible duplication	
Drum Monastery		early monastic site, founded in the late 5th century? by Diradius (not Diratus of Ferns), brother of St Canoc	Edardruim
Drumalgagh Priory		Augustinian nuns — Arroasian dependent on Clonard; founded before 1195, confirmed to the nuns of Clonard; dependent on Kilcreevanty from before 1223, confirmed to the nuns of Kilcreevanty c.1223 and 1400; dissolved c.1543?; owned by Earl of Clanricarde 1641	St Mary ____________________; Druimeliar; Drumcliff; Dromalga
Drumconnel Monastery ^{~}		early monastic site, founded in the 5th century (in the time of St Patrick) by St Conal?; also given as located in County Galway	Druim-conaille
Drumconaid Abbey		Cistercian monks — from Boyle founded c.1156, transferred from Grellechdinach; dissolved 1158-9: transferred to Buniffi/Boyle c.1158/9	Drumcunny; Drum-conaid
Dysart Abbey ^{ø}		Cistercian monks land granted to St Mary's Abbey, Dublin by Rory O'Conor not later than 1236; abbey probably never built	Briole; Bruigheol
Elphin Cathedral Monastery		early monastic site, traditionally founded c.450 (434 or 435) by St Patrick; diocesan cathedral c.1130; see transferred to Roscommon 1152; see transferred from Roscommon c.1168; Augustinian Canons Regular - Arroasian? founded after 1140; see transferred from Elphin 1244; dissolved before 1442; storm damaged 1957, demolished shortly afterwards; ruins partially restored	St Mary ____________________; Ailfinn; Ail-find; Oilfinn; Olfin; Emlach-ono
Elphin Greyfriars ^{=}		early monastic site, founded in the 5th century by St Patrick, tradition that Ono, son of Oengus gifted his house to St Patrick; Franciscan Friars Minor, Conventual founded before 1453, parish church of St Patrick granted to the friars by Cornelius, Bishop of Elphin before 1450, Cornelius was instructed by the Pope to license new friaries 1453; dissolved 1563, friars expelled by the Protestant bishop, who demolished the friary and built a house from the ruins; granted to Terence O'Birne-Termor; erroneously referred to as Dominican in inquisition 1591	St Patrick
Elphin Greyfriars, later site		Observant Franciscan Friars reformed 1632	
Emlagh Monastery		early monastic site, founded in the 5th century?, bishop listed in the time of St Patrick	Imblech-each; Imblech-brocadha
Fuerty Monastery		early monastic site, founded in the 5th century by St Patrick for deacon Just	Fidard; Fidarte
Grange Abbey, Kilbride parish		purported abbey (Note: Memorial Atlas of Ireland, 1901 and Ordnance Survey (½ inch))	Kilcrea
Grellachdinach Priory ^{~}		Cistercian monks — from Mellifont founded 1148; dissolved 1155-6, transferred to Drumconaid, Bunfinny and Boyle; possibly located in County Roscommon	Grellechdinach
Inchmacnerin Abbey, Church Island, Lough Key		early monastic site, Patrician monks founded in the 6th century; Augustinian Canons Regular — Arroasian? founded 1140-70?; dissolved before 1596; founded post1140; dissolved 1569?; granted to William Taaffe 1596; (NM)	St Mary ____________________; Inis-mac-n-erin; Insula-Macnery; Insula-Machum; Inch-vicrinni; Church Island, Lough Key (not Eas-mac-eirc, as given by some, which is Assylin (q.v.))
Inchmean Priory	Benedictine monks — duplication of Inchmean, County Mayo (Note: duplication by Mervyn Archdall, Monasticon Hibernicum, 1786, due to error in Louis Augustin Alemand, Monasticum Hibernicum, translated and edited by John Stevens, 1722)		
Kilbride Abbey ^{ø}		"Abbey" (Note: Memorial Atlas of Ireland, 1901 and Ordnance Survey) possibly connected with Derrane Priory, supra	
Kilcanuran Monastery		early monastic site	Cill-ceanuran; Beech Abbey
Kilconan Abbey ^{ø}		"Abbey", founded 1339 (Note: Mervyn Archdall, Monasticon Hibernicum, 1786, pp. 290-1, erroneously attributes references to a church in Annals of Loch Cé, edited by William Maunsell Hennessy, M.R.I.A., Dublin, 1939, as being of an abbey)	
Kilcooley Monastery		early monastic site (Note: Acta Sanctorum veteris et majoris Scotiae, seu Hiberniæ, Sanctorum Insulae..., p.377)	Cell-cuile; Cul-silinne; Kilchule
Kildallog Monastery ^{≈~}		early monastic site	Kiltrustan?, (infra)
Killaraght Monastery	Historical county location. See entry under County Sligo		
Killinmulrooney Cell		Augustinian nuns — Arroasian dependent on Kilcreevanty; founded before 1223, church granted to the nuns of Kilcreevanty by Pope Honorius III c.1223 and by Pope Boniface IX 1400; dissolved 1543?	St Mary ____________________; Cuilleen
Kilmore Monastery		early monastic site, purportedly founded in the 5th century by St Patrick for Conleng and Ercleng; mistaken by early sources for Kilmore, County Cavan; Augustinian Canons Regular 155 183; Augustinian Friars	Cella-magna-deathreab; Cell-mor-maige-glaiss; Cell-mor-tir-briuin-na-sina; Moyglass
Kilmore Monastery		possible early monastic site separate from above, founded in the 6th century by St Colmcille; burned by the Ui Cremthainn 757	Cell-mor-dithrib
Kilnamanagh Monastery		early monastic site, founded in the 5th century by St Patrick	Cluain-na-manach
Kilronan Abbey		6th century	
Kiltrustan Monastery ^{≈~}		early monastic site; (Note: Gazetteer of Great Britain and Ireland, iv, p.2) possibly Kildallog	Kildallog?, (supra)
Knockvicar Friary		Franciscan Friars, Third Order Regular foundation unknown erroneously referred to as Dominican Friars, purportedly by the Bingham family, (Note: Louis Augustin Alemand,Monasticum Hibernicum, edited and translated by John Stevens, 1722; p.227) however they were not in Ireland at the time; (Note: J. O'Heyne, O.P., Irish Dominicans (Epil. Chron. ..), (translated by A. Coleman, O.P., 1902), 1706, p. 271) dissolved c.1583-4; granted to Richard Kendlemarch (Kyndelinshe)	Cnoc-bhicarre; Cnoc-an-bicairi
Lissonuffy Cell		Augustinian Canons Regular — Arroasian dependent on Cong; foundation unknown; dissolved before 1592; granted to Trinity College, Dublin	Liss-O-nDubhthaig; Lyssenowfe; Lis-duffe; Lys-duffe
Loughkey Abbey		early monastic site, founded by 700; (Note: Conry: Mervyn Archdall, Monasticon Hibernicum, 1786, p.614); Premonstratensian Canons daughter of Prémontré founded after 1217-8 (c.1215) by Clarus MacMailin, archdeacon of Elphin; raised to abbey status c.1235; held in commendam by Rory MacDermot from 1548; granted to Robert Harrison 1594; dissolved after 1600?, monks probably remained in occupation until 1608; (NM)	The Holy Trinity ____________________; Lough Cé; Trinity Island
Monasterevan Monastery ^{≈~}		purportedly Augustinian Canons Regular or Crutched Friars (if Rindown)	Rindown?; Monastereoin?
Ogulla Monastery		early monastic site	Oghdeala
Oran Monastery		early monastic site, founded in the 5th century by St Patrick	Uaran; Huaran; Cell-garad; Ballydooley
Rindown Priory Hospital		Crutched Friars (or less likely Knights Hospitaller) founded before 1216, believed to be by King John for the Cruciferi or for the Knights Hospitallers; plundered 1229; raided by Felim O'Conor 1216; burnt by Aed O'Conor 1270 dissolved before 1569; granted to Christopher Davers 1569; leased to George Goodman 1588	St John the Baptist ____________________; Randoon; Rinnduin; Renydwyn; Tea-eon; St John's de Rynndum; Monaster-eoin-baisde; Monaster-evin
Rindown Priory ^{~≈}		Premonstratensian Canons, possible confusion with Monasterevan, supra	Monasterevan?
Roscommon Abbey		early monastic site, founded in the 6th century by St Comman, disciple of St Finnian of Clonard; diocesan cathedral see translated from Elphin 1152; see translated to Elphin c.1168; Augustinian Canons Regular — Arroasian founded after 1140, possibly with Arroasian reformation 1140-8 by Turlogh O'Conor at the instance of St Malachy; plundered by William de Burgo 1204; burned by the Anglo-Normans 1235 and 1247; plundered by Mac William de Burgo 1260; dissolved before 1578; granted to Sir Nicholas Malbye 1578; granted to Francis Viscount Valentia 1615; Augustinian Friars	St Mary ____________________; Ros-comain; Ros-chomon; Ros-camain; Ros-coman
Roscommon Priory		Augustinian nuns — Arroasian founded after 1144; possible double monastery with Roscommon Abbey (see immediately above); dependent on Kilcreevanty after 1223, church confirmed to the nuns of Kilcreevanty by Pope Honorius III c.1223 and by Pope Boniface IX 1400; dissolved after 1223-4, nuns probably transferred to Termonkeelin after 1223-4	St Mary
Roscommon Blackfriars		Dominican Friars founded 1253 by Felim O'Conor, King of Connacht, buried here; consecrated 1257 by Thomas O'Conor, Bishop of Elphin; burned 1270; Dominican Annals of Roscommon written up to 1314 dissolved 1573; leased to Thomas le Strange 1573; ruinous by 1612; granted to Francis Viscount Valentia 1615; friars remained in the vicinity, continuing into the 19th century	The Friary Church of the Blessed Virgin Mary, Roscommon
Roscommon Greyfriars		Franciscan Friars founded 1268–69, founder unknown; dissolved 1270 when burned; could not be restored as the founder had died	
Templemoyle Abbey		possible early monastic site	Kilnanooan
Termonkeelin Priory		Augustinian nuns — Arroasian — possibly from Derrane and Roscommon dependent on Kilcreevanty; founded after 1223-4; dissolved during the reign of Queen Elizabeth?	Termon-caelaind; Termon-Keelan
Tibohine Monastery		early monastic site, founded probably in the late 6th century by St Baithen Mac Cuanach; plundered by the king of Feara-Manach 1201; plundered by Aed Muimnech 1233	Tech-Baithin; Teach-Baithin
Tisrara Nunnery		"Nunnery" (Note: Memorial Atlas of Ireland, 1901 and Ordnance Survey (½ inch))	
Toberelly Friary		Franciscan Friars, Third Order Regular cell or chapel, foundation unknown; dissolved during the reign of Queen Elizabeth	Toberelvy; Tobar-ailbhe?
Toomona Friary		Franciscan Friars, Third Order Regular founded in the 15th century?, founded by the O'Conor family; also dubiously given as Dominican Friars dissolved 1585-8; granted to Richard Kyndelinshe (Kendlemarch) 1588	Tuaim-mona; Toemonia; Towemona; Tumona
Tulsk Priory		Dominican Friars founded 1448 by a (Mac)Dowell or other, land granted by Felim (Fedlimid) mac Fedlimid O'Conor, buried here; dissolved before 1591?; land granted to Terence O'Byrne 1594; friary granted to William Taaffe 1596; repaired by Bingham 1595	St Patrick ____________________; Tulsk Abbey; Tuilsce; Tuillsgi; Twilskye

Return to top of page

==== County Sligo ====
(For references and location detail see List of monastic houses in County Sligo)

Foundation	Image	Communities & Provenance	Formal Name or Dedication & Alternative Names
Achonry Monastery		early monastic site, founded 7th century by St Finnian of Clonard; diocesan cathedral 1152	Achadh-conaire; Achadh-caoin; Achada; Cluain-Cain-i-n-Achud
Achonry Abbey		"Abbey (in ruins)" (Note: Ordnance Survey)	Achadh-conaire; Achadh-caoin; Achada; Cluain-Cain-i-n-Achud
Aghanagh Monastery		early monastic site, founded 5th century by St Patrick for Bishop Manus (Maine) and Gentene	Achanagh; Each-aineach; Each-enach
Alternan Monastery		early monastic site, founded 6th century by St Colmcille or St Farranan; granted to St Farranan by St Colmcille	Alt-fharannain
Annaghloy Abbey		"Abbey", (Note: Memorial Atlas of Ireland) unknown foundation, order or period; Lough Arrow	
Athmoy Cell		Premonstratensian Canons dependent on Loughkey; cell, probably non-conventual, founded 1232 by Clarus MacMailin, archdeacon of Elphin; dissolved before 1594; granted to Robert Harrison 1594	Holy Trinity ____________________; Ath Mugi; Killamoy; Foyoges
Aughris Priory		early monastic site, founded by St Molaise of Inishmurray; Augustinian Canons Regular founded before 1172? by the Macdonalds, Irish noblemen; dissolved c.1584	St Mary ____________________; Eachros; Acharas; Agharois; Akeras; Keras; Kilmaltin; Inishmurray; Insula Mary
Ballindoon Priory		Dominican Friars possibly licensed from Athenry 1427 founded 1507 purportedly by a Mac Donogh, begun by Thomas O'Farrell; founded 1507; dissolved c. 1585; granted to Sir Francis Crofton (Grofton) after 1591, assigned to Sir Robert King	St Mary ____________________; Ballindoon Abbey; Baile-an-duin; Ballin-dune
Ballinley Abbey ^{≈?}		suggested Cistercian monks prior to settling at Boyle — dubious; "ruins of an abbey"	Ballinlig; Bunnina/Bunfinny (dubious)
Ballymote Friary		Franciscan Friars, Third Order Regular founded before 1442 by Cugawrag M'Donough; burned, plundered and exiled by Donarus Macdonkayd 1483; dissolved before 1584; granted to Sir Henry Broncard, assigned to Sir William Taafe; destroyed by rebels c. 1584-6; Dominican Friars (Note: Pat. R. James I, pt.2, p.52)	Baile-an-mhota; Baile-in-mota; Ath-cliath-in-chorain; Balemouta
Ballymote Preceptory ^{~}		suggested Knights Hospitaller — possibly Temple House, infra	Temple House?
Ballynagalliagh Priory		nuns at Keelty possibly transferred here; Augustinian nuns — Arroasian dependent on Kilcreevanty; founded after 1223?; dissolved before 1562?; granted to the Earl of Clanricarde 1562	
Ballysadare Abbey		early monastic site, founded 7th century by St Fechin of Fore; Augustinian Canons Regular — Arroasian? founded before 1166?; dissolved 1588?; leased to Bryan FitzWilliam 1588; Augustinian Friars	St Mary (and St Fechin) ___________________; Baile-essa-dara; Assadare; Astrura; Esdara; Templemore
Banada Priory		Augustinian Friars founded 1423 by Donough O'Hara (Donatus Heagiaa) (son of John (Joannis Pheadgra)) who granted site; Observant Augustinian Friars reform adopted by decree of the prior general 29 December 1423 dissolved c.1613; founded 1423; dissolved c.1613; Irish Sisters of Charity founded 1858	Corpus Christi ____________________; Beannada; Bennatta; Benfada
Billa Monastery		early monastic site, founded 7th century by St Fechin of Fore	Bile-Fechin; Bile-fobhair
Buniffi Abbey ^{~}		Cistercian monks founded c.1158/9, transferred from Drumconaid; probably Bunfhinne, Dromard Parish, County Sligo; dissolved 1161, transferred to Boyle	Bunfinny; Bunnina; Bunfhinne
Caille-au-inde Monastery ^{~≈?}		early monastic site, founded by St Fintan, son of Aid; possibly located in County Sligo, also suggested to be Cally, Perthshire	Caille-aibhinne; Caille-eavinde
Carricknahorna Monastery		early monastic site, nuns, founded 5th century by St Patrick for Macet, Cergen, Rodanus and Matona	Tech-na-gCailleach-dubha; Senchell-damaigi; Senella-cella-dumiche? nr Corradoo
Church Island Monastery, Lough Gill		early monastic site, founded 6th century (in the time of St Colmcille) by St Loman, son of Dallan; burned 1416	Inis-mor
Cloghermore Nunnery ^{~}		nuns — order, foundation and period unknown	
Cloonameehan Friary		Dominican Friars founded 1488 by Eugene Mac Donogh, license granted by Pope Innocent VIII 1488, on petition of Mac Donogh, the Baron of Norach and Edmund de Lantu; dissolved c.1584; granted to Richard Kyndelinshe (Kindlemersh); passed to the Taaffes, then to the Earl of Shelburne	Clonymeaghan; Cloonmahen; Cloonoghil
Cloonoghill Abbey		early monastic site, founded 6th century by Aedan O Fiachrach in Corran	Cluain-eochaill nr Ballyangloch
Court Friary		Franciscan Friars, Third Order Regular founded after 1449 by Father Andrew O'Clumhain (Coleman), land granted by John O'Hara, with the approval of Cornelius O'Moghan, Bishop of Achonry; dissolved 1588; granted to Richard Kyndelinshe 1588; granted to William Taaffe 1598; granted to Francis Edgworth 1623/4	Abbey Court; Cooit; Cuit-ruardri; Cuirtwilleag
Dromard Monastery		early monastic site, nuns, traditionally founded 5th century by St Patrick	Druim-ard; Druim-n-ard
Druimlias Monastery ^{≈~}		early monastic site	Drumlease, County Leitrim?
Druimeidirdhaloch Monastery ^{≈~}		early monastic site, founded by St Finnian of Clonard	Kildalough?
Druimnea Monastery ^{~}		early monastic site, founded 5th century by St Patrick; possibly located in County Sligo	
Drumcliff Monastery		early monastic site, founded 575 by St Colmcille, site granted by Ard son of Ainmire; plundered 1315; probably dissolved c.1503; N15 road now bisects the site	Druim-cliabh
Drumcolumb Monastery		early monastic site, founded 6th century by St Colmcille for his disciple Finbarr	Druim-coluim; Druim-namac
Drumrat Monastery		early monastic site, founded 7th century by St Fechin of Fore	Druim-raite
Easky Abbey ^{ø}		"Abbey (in ruins)" (Note: Ordnance Survey)	
Emlaghfad Monastery		early monastic site, founded 6th century by St Colmcille for Enna, son of Nuadhain	Imblech-foda; Emlyfad; Tulach-segsa; Tulach-segra
Enachard Monastery		early monastic site, nuns; purportedly transferred to Clogher	Annaghard; Clogher?
Faebhran Monastery ^{~≈}		suggested early monastic site	Foibren; probably Foyron, County Westmeath
Inishmore Monastery, Lough Arrow		"monastery" (Note: Ordnance Survey) — order, foundation and period unknown	Killadoon
Inishmurray Monastery		early monastic site, probably founded 5th century (in the time of St Patrick) by St Laisren (Molaise); burned by the Norsemen 807; transferred to the mainland and united with Aughris; probably used as a hermitage into the medieval period	Inis-muridaig
Keelty Monastery		early monastic site, nuns, founded by St Muadnata?	Caile-nadfrath
Kilcumin Monastery		early monastic site, possibly founded by St Caeman or St Comegen	Kilcomin
Kilcumin Friary		Franciscan Friars, Third Order Regular dependent on Court; founded after 1454; dissolved 1588?	Kilcomin
Killadoon Priory^{~}		Premonstratensian Canons church belonging to Loughkey	Cell-duibh-duin
Killaraght Monastery		early monastic site, nuns, founded 5th century by St Patrick; nuns, possibly Augustinian — Arroasian — evidence lacking; dependent on Kilcreevanty?; founded after 1223?; dissolved c.1591?; granted to Terence O'Byrne (Tirlaughe O'Byrnem) 1594; assigned to the Earl of Clanricarde by Terence O'Byrne	Cell-adrochta; Cell-Athracta; Killarighla
Killaspugbrone Monastery		early monastic site	Caisel-Irrae; Cashel; Cell-espuig-broin; Cell-epscoip-broin
Killerry Monastery		early monastic site, founded 5th century? (in the time of St Patrick?); erenagh recorded up to 1416	Cell-oiridh
Kilmacowen Monastery		early monastic site, probably founded before mid 6th century by Diermit, son of Eugenius mac Murchad; granted to Loughkey Abbey c.1239	Rosredheadh
Kilnemanagh Monastery		early monastic site, founded 7th century by St Fechin of Fore; Augustinian Canons Regular dependent on Ballysadare; cell? founded before 1170?; dissolved before 1400; granted to Richard, Earl of Clanricarde before 1603 (during the reign of Queen Elizabeth)	Cell-na-manach
Kilross Monastery		early monastic site Premonstratensian Canons daughter of Loughkey; founded 1233-5 by Clarus MacMailin; evidently non-conventual; dissolved before 1594; granted to Robert Harrison 1594; ruins in existence 1890	Holy Trinity ____________________; Cell-fhraes; Cell-rass; Cell-Rais; Kil-ruisse
Knockmore Monastery		Carmelite Friars founded c.1320; also given as Dominican Friars — probable erroneous interpretation of the reference to the Carmelites here as "black friars"; dissolved before 1594	Grand Mont
Monasteraden Monastery		early monastic site, founded by St Aedhan (probably Aedhan O Fiachrach)	
Monaster-Cheathramh-nTeampuill Monastery		early monastic site	
Scurmor Friary		Augustinian Friars founded before 1454, site granted by Thady Odubha (O'Dowda) on petition of friars Eugene Ocaemayn (O'Knavin) and Thady Macfirbissyg (MacFirbis); dissolved before 1603? (during the reign of Queen Elizabeth?); masonry purportedly used to construct a house for the landlord, later converted for use as a hotel	Holy Trinity ____________________; Inis-tormor; Inis-morensis; Instuamor
Shancough Monastery		early monastic site, possibly founded 5th century by St Patrick	Seanchua-ua-n-oiliolla; Senchua
Skreen Monastery		early monastic site, founded 6th century by St Colmcille who was granted site to found a monastery by Tibrad, prince of Tir Fiachrach; site occupied by remains of medieval church	Scrin-adamnain; Scrinium S. Adamnani; Scrine
Sligo Friary		Dominican Friars founded 1252 by Maurice fitz Gerald; consecrated 1253; burned down accidentally 1414; rebuilt 1416 by br Brian, son of Dermot Mac Donogh; dissolved 1595, judged to be property of the Crown, friars probably dispersed at this time; granted to William Taaffe by James I; in use as a court house 1608; friars probably restored by 1624; destroyed, friars seeking refuge in caves and woods in the vicinity during 1630s; friars restored by 1641; Premonstratensian Canons; (NM)	Priory of the Holy Cross ____________________ 'Sligo Abbey' ; Sliccech; Sligech; Selgia
Sligo Priory *		Dominican Friars church dedicated 6 January 1848; priory built 1865; rebuilt and re-dedicated 13 May 1973; extant	Holy Cross Priory, Sligo
Staad Abbey		early monastic site, reputedly founded by St Molaise of Inishmurray; possible cell of Innishmurray	Teampall-na-staide; Steedagh
Tawnagh Monastery		early monastic site, founded 5th century by St Patrick and Bishop Cairell	Tamnach
Temple House		Knights Templar founded after 1269 (during the reign of Henry III); dissolved 1270?, retaining a church and property in the area after the destruction of the castle; Knights Hospitaller 342; probably passed to the Crutched Friars of Rindown after 1312	Tech-Temple; Taght-tampul; Domuis Templi; Templehouse; Loghnehely
Toomour Monastery		early monastic site	Tuaim-fobhair; Cell-Easpaig-Luidhigh; Cell-epscoip-buidhidh

Return to top of page

==== County Tipperary ====
(For references and location detail see List of monastic houses in County Tipperary)

Foundation	Image	Communities & Provenance	Formal Name or Dedication & Alternative Names
Baptistgrange ^{~}		Crutched Friars (Augustinian rule) non-conventual grange of St John the Baptist's, Dublin; leased to the Countess of Ormond 1541	Athforth; Achadfada; Achfada
Ardcrony Monastery		early monastic site, under coarbs	Ardcroine
Ardfinnan Monastery ^{#}		early monastic site, founded late 7th century? by St Finan Lobhar (Finan the Leper); burned by the Normans 1178 Franciscan Friars, Third Order Regular foundation and founder unknown; dissolved c.1542; occupancy by Robert Butler 1548	Ard-finain; Ard-fenan
Ardfinnan Preceptory? ^{#}		possibly Knights Templar, initially under Templetown; Knights Hospitaller, under Kilsaran founded 1212? (when church confirmed to the Hospitallers)	Ard-finain; Ard-fenan
Athassel Priory		Augustinian Canons Regular founded 1192 (c.1200) by William de Burgo, confirmed by King John 1205; erroneously attributed as Trinitarian; (Note: cf Louis Augustin Alemand, Monasticum Hibernicum, translated and edited by John Stevens, 1722, p.150) held in commandam by Edmund Butler, Archbishop of Cashel; dissolved 1541; leased to Dermot Ryan; granted to Thomas, Earl of Ormond and Ossory 1557; (NM)	Priory of St Edmund, King and Martyr ____________________; Ath-an-tuisil; Ath-iseal; Ath-aysill; Hachassel; Hassel
Cahir Priory		Augustinian Canons Regular founded c.1200–1220 (during the reign of King John) by Galfrid de Camville; dissolved 1540; church parochial and conventual buildings occupied by Sir Thomas Butler by January 1541; priory alienated by William Hutchinson and Edward Walshe 1561; granted to Sir Edmond Butler 1566	St Mary ____________________; Caher; Cathair-duine-iascaid; Cahir-Dunesk; Cayrdunheach; Chaier
Carrick on Suir Priory		Franciscan nuns founded 1385?; dissolved 1542? house purportedly built on site, before 1603 (during the reign of Elizabeth I) by Thomas, 10th Earl of Ormond as principal residence for the earls of Ormond	Carrick-magriffin; Carrig-magriffin; Roche Swiry
Carrick on Suir Hospital Priory		Order of St Thomas of Acon founded c.1236 by William de Cantelo, with the consent of his wife Dionisia, confirmed by John de Norragh c.1250; dependent on Acon, London; dwellings leased to James White 1530; leased to Peter Butler, Earl of Ossory 1534 (Earl of Ormond from 1537); dissolved 1536?; granted to Thomas, Earl of Ormond	Hospital of St John the Evangelist
Carrick on Suir — Mount St Nicholas Monastery			
Carrick on Suir Hospitallers		Knights Hospitaller, frankhouse under the Hospital of Any, recorded 1541	
Cashel Monastery		early monastic site, foundation unknown; diocesan cathedral built 1101 or 1111 rebuilt 1169-72 by Domnall Mór O'Brien; rebuilt after c.1224	Caiseal; Caissel-narig
Cashel Priory		Benedictine monks dependent on Ratisbon; founded before 1134 at the instance of Dirmicius, Abbot of Ratisbon; St Cormac's probably the monks' chapel; expelled 1269-72 by David Mac Carwill, Archbishop of Cashel	St James
Cashel Dominican Friary		Dominican Friars founded 1243 by David O'Kelly, a Dominican friar of Cork; burned accidentally; rebuilt and co-founded by John Cantwell 1480; partly leased by Prior Edward Brown 1535-6; dissolved 1540; surrendered by Prior Edward Brown 8 April 1540; leased to Peter Kelly and Walter Fleming; granted to Walter Fleming 1543-4; receiver Walter Houthe 1548; (NM)	St Dominic
Cashel Franciscan Friary ^{#}		Franciscan Friars Minor, Conventual; founded c.1265 (during the reign of Henry III) by Lord William Hacket; Observant Franciscan Friars reformed 1538; rented to Edmund Butler, Archbishop of Cashel, December 1538; dissolved 1540; surrendered by Diermit, guardian, 7 April 1540; friars apparently permitted to remain; abandoned due to religious persecution c.1550, a new house being provided for them 1618 (see immediately below); site now occupied by St John the Baptist R.C. parish church	'Hackett's Abbey'
Cashel Franciscan Friary, later site		Observant Franciscan Friars founded 1618	
Cashel Hospitallers		Knights Hospitaller frankhouse under the Hospital of Any, recorded 1541	
Cluain-conbruin Monastery ^{~≈?}		early monastic site, founded by St Abban	possibly Rathcoun (infra)
Clonfinglass Monastery		early monastic site, founded by St Abban	Cluain-finndglaisse
Clonmel Friary		Franciscan Friars Minor, Conventual founded 1269 by Otho de Grandison or the Geraldine family (the earls of Desmond), or by the townsmen of Clonmel; Observant Franciscan Friars reformed 1536; dissolved 1540, surrendered by Robert Travers, guardian, 8 March 1540; granted to the town 1541-2; later granted to James, Earl of Ormond reopened in 1827 on the original site	
Clonmel White Friary		Carmelite Friars foundation unknown; dissolved c.1541, surrendered by the prior by April 1541; church found to be in parochial use; refounded by c.1737	
Clonmel Black Friary		Dominican Friars probably founded shortly before 1641; probably dissolved at the Cromwellian persecution; friars made an unsuccessful bid to return after the Restoration	
Clonoulty Preceptory		Knights Templar founded before 1200?, founder unknown; dissolved 1308-11; Knights Hospitaller	Clon-al; Clon-aul; Clonnell
Colethe Grange ^{~}		Cistercian monks grange of Holycross, granted by Donal O'Brien	Cealuatair; Colethr; Cul-etu
Coninga Monastery ^{~≈?}		early monastic site, founded by St Declan of Ardmore for some of his disciples; possibly located in County Tipperary	possibly Ardfinnan (supra)
Corbally Priory		Augustinian Canons Regular — from Monaincha founded c.1485?; dissolved before 1585; granted to Sir Lucas Dillon 1585-6	SS Mary and Hilary; Holy Cross (from c.1485); St Mary (from 1486-7) ____________________; Corbhaile; Monaincha
Daire-mor Monastery		early monastic site, founded by mid 7th century	Doire-mor
Derrynavlan Monastery		early monastic site, founded before 800	Daire-edhnigh; Daire-eithne
Donaghmore Monastery		early monastic site, founded 6th century (during the time of St Colmcille and Ita) by Farannan, bishop	Domnach-mor-maige-femen
Donaghmore Monastery		early monastic site, probably founded by St Erc of Donaghmore, County Kildare	Killerk
Dromineer Monastery ^{ø}		purported intended foundation of monks, order unknown, which was never implemented; 12th century ruins	
St. Aibhe's Monastery, Emly ^{#}		early monastic site, founded 5th/6th century by St Ailbe; diocesan cathedral 1111 see united to Cashel 1562; secular college founded after 1505 and before 1542 by Bishop Thomas Hurley (dissolved c.1562); site currently occupied by St Ailbe's C.I. parish church	Imlech-Ibhair; Imblech-iobhair
Fethard Priory		Augustinian Friars founded 1306, site granted by Walter Mulcote; dissolved 1540; granted to Edmund Butler, Baron of Dunboyne 16 January 1544; ruins regained c.1820 new Augustinian house established in Fethard; nave restored for parochial use 19th century	Holy Trinity ____________________; Fiodh-ard; Fetherd; Fiard; Fyddert
Fethard Friary ^{ø}		listed in 1573 as Dominican Friars; (Note: Ex. Reg. (IV, p.39) Mag. — no other record found) — evidence lacking	
Galbally Friary		Franciscan Friars Minor, Conventual founded 1471 by O'Brien; plundered 1472; Observant Franciscan Friars reformed c.1536?; officially suppressed 1540; granted to John, brother of the Earl of Desmond 1543-4, friars permitted to remain; dissolved 1570; (NM)	Gallbhaile-eatharlach; Mowre; Moor Abbey
Glenkeen Monastery ^{≈?}		early monastic site, founded 5th century by St Patrick (if Glenshaoin) or St Culan (if in the valley of Glean-chaoin)	Glean-chaoin; Glenn-chaoin
Holy Cross Abbey ^{+}		early monastic site, purportedly hermit monks in the woods; Benedictine monks? possibly founded 1169? by Donal (Mor) O'Brien, King of Limerick; Cistercian monks — from Monasteranenagh founded 1180; subject to Furness 1249; subject to Monasteranenagh 1278; subject to Mellifont 1289; erroneously given as Tironensian; (Note: Monasticon (1846) v. 150;) dissolved 1540; granted to Thomas, Earl of Ormond during the reign of Queen Mary, confirmed after 1558 by Elizabeth I; granted to Gerald, Earl of Ormond, 1563; monks permitted to remain in the abbey or the vicinity; in use as secular college 1540, probably until accession of Queen Mary 1553; became ruinous; restored for worship 1971-75; (NM)	Holycross; Monaster-na-croiche-naoimhe; Sancta Crux; Oterlaun; Wochturlawyn;
Hore Abbey		Cistercian monks — from Mellifont refounded 1272 by David Mac Carwill, Archbishop of Cashel; dissolved 1540, surrendered by Abbot Patrick Stackbold; leased to Sir Henry Radcliffe 1561	
Ibracense Monastery ^{~}		order unknown, founded 1127 or soon after by St Malachy for brethren from Ulster; possibly located in County Tipperary	
Inishlounaght Abbey		early monastic site, founded before 656 by St Pulcherius; Cistercian monks — probably from Mellifont founded 1147-8 (before May 1148); dependent on Monateranenagh from 1151; dissolved 1540; granted to Cormac M'Teigh M'Carthy	Inis-leamhnachta; Inis-lannaught; Suir; de Surio
Inishlounaght Nunnery		Cistercian? nuns purported house adjoining the Cistercian monks' abbey (see immediately above); foundation and status unknown; dissolved 1228 by Stephen of Lexington	
Kilbarron Monastery		"ruins", (Note: Ordnance Survey) traditionally monastic — evidence lacking	
Kilcash Monastery		early monastic site, founded by St Colman ua hEirc?	Cell-caisi
Kilclispeen Monastery		early monastic site; decorated high crosses remain	Cell-clispin; Kilklispeen
Kilcommon Priory		Benedictine monks dependent on Glastonbury, Somerset; founded c.1200 by Philip of Worcester; dissolved c.1332?, probably abandoned following Glastonbury's loss of property in Ireland	SS Philip, James and Armin (Cumin) ____________________; Kil-comin; Kil-cumin
Kilcooly Abbey		possibly Benedictine monks founded c.1182, site granted to the coarb of Mag Airb by Donal Mor O'Brien; Cistercian monks — from Jerpoint (re?)founded 1184, confirmed by Henry III; dissolved 1540, surrendered by Abbot Thomas Shortall 8 April 1540; church was found to be in parochial use 11 January 1541; occupier James, Earl of Ormond; (NM)	St Mary the Virgin and St Benedict; St Mary (confirmation of Henry III) ____________________; Albicamp; de Arvi Campo; Arvicampus; Kil-cuile; Kil-coul; Kyllecouill
Kilkeary Monastery		early monastic site, nuns, founded before 679; mistaken for Kilcrea, County Cork (Note: Colgan and Mervyn Archdall, Monasticon Hibernicum, 1786, p.72)	Cell-cere
Killalie Friary ^{≈}	Franciscan Friars, Third Order Regular — actually Killeenagalive, infra		
Killeennagallive Friary		Franciscan Friars, Third Order Regular founded before 1461; dissolved 1543, possibly abandoned during persecution; Franciscan Friars Minor, Conventual founded after 1543; dissolved during the reign of Elizabeth I?	Killin-ndeallubh; Killin-enallagh; Killin-nandealbh; Killalowe; Kyllalie; Templebredon
Kilmore Monastery		early monastic site	Cell-mor-aradtire
Lady's Abbey		Carmelite nuns founded after 1314?; dissolved c.1541?	Mainister-Mhuire; Ardfinnan
Latteragh Monastery		early monastic site	Leatharach; Leitrioch-odrain; Leitreach-odrain; Lettir-odrain; Lattracha
Leamakevoge Monastery		early monastic site, founded by St Mochemoc (Pulcherius); also erroneously given as County Offaly, by confusion with Manchán of Lemanaghan (Note: Mervyn Archdall, Monasticon Hibernicum, 1786, p.402)	Liath-mochoemocc; Liath-mor; Leighmore; Lethmor; Liethmor
Lemdruim Monastery ^{~}		early monastic site; also given as Lorum, County Carlow (Note: Petrie, p.40)	
Lorrha Monastery		early monastic site, founded before 558 by St Brendan; refounded before 584 by St Ruadhan; burned by the Norsemen 845; church built on site c.1000, ruins remain	
Lorrha Priory ^{#}		Augustinian Canons Regular founded after 1140?, on the site of the earlier monastery (see immediately above), apparently built to the north of the earlier monastic church; burned 1157 and 1179; transferred [sic] to new site, adjacent (see immediately below); church in parochial use; became ruinous; 19th-century C.I. parish church built adjacent	St Rogan / St Ruadan ____________________; Lothea; Loghera; Lorrah; Lurchoe; de Fontis Vivi de Lochra; Lothor
Lorrha Priory of St Ruadán		Augustinian Canons Regular founded at earlier site (see immediately above) c.1140, dissolved c.1578?; lease granted to John Hogan, former prior, 2 June 1552, who possibly allowed the Canons to remain; Augustinian Friars founded c.1643	
Lorrha Friary		Dominican Friars founded 1269 by Walter de Burgo, Earl of Ulster; dissolved 1552; lease granted to John Hogan, former prior of the Augustinian Priory, 2 June 1552 erroneously shown as "Franciscan Abbey (in ruins)" on Ordnance Survey	St Peter, Martyr
Lorrha Abbey		suggested Benedictine monks (Note: Louis Augustin Alemand, Monasticum Hibernicum, translated and edited by John Stevens, 1722, pp.71-72) founded by St Deicola? (Deicolus?)	
Molough Priory		early monastic site, nuns, abbey? founded late 5th century; Augustinian nuns priory, founded 14th century? by the Butler family; dissolved 1540, surrendered by Prioress Joan Powere, 11 April 1540; granted to Robert Butler c.1540; church found to be in parochial use 1541; leased to Sir Henry Ratcliff 1576	St Brigid ____________________; Molaca-Brigde; Mainistir-Brigde; Mag-lacha; Moillagh; Mollaghe; Moylagh
Monaincha Priory		early monastic site, Culdees hermits founded 6th century; existing in the time of St Cainnech of Aghaboe; Culdees moved to the chapel of St Colum on the arrival of the Augustinians; Augustinian Canons Regular founded after 1140; dissolved c.1485?, transferred to Corbally; Augustinian Friars	St Hilary; St Mary (from c.1400?); Holy Cross (from 18 April 1485) ____________________; Mona Incha; Inis-locha-cré; Inis-na-mBeo; Loch-cré; Inchinemeo; Cree-stagnum; Inchanames; Kilbar [sic.]
Nenagh Friary		Franciscan Friars founded 13th century (during the reign of Henry III) by a Kennedy (possibly L. O'Kennedy) or a Butler dissolved before 1587; granted on lease to Robert Collum (Collam) 1587	Aonagh-urmumam; Oinach-urmumam; Enagh; Lenaenach; Venath
Nenagh — Tyone Priory Hospital		Fratres Cruciferi under Augustinian Canons Regular founded c.1200 by Theobald Walter, Pincerna of Ireland; burned by O'Kennedy 1342 became secular 1541-2, dependent on St John's, Dublin; dissolved 1551; granted to Oliver Grace 1563	St John the Baptist ____________________; Tyone Priory
Rathcoun Monastery		"Site of monastery", (Note: Ordnance Survey) supposed friary (Note: Ordnance Survey Letters, O'Donovan and others (Royal Irish Academy))	
Rathronan Camera		Knights Templar founded 13th century; dissolved 1308; Knights Hospitaller	
Roscrea Friary		Franciscan Friars Minor, Conventual founded before 1477; Observant Franciscan Friars reformed c.1490; dissolved c.1579, destroyed by the Protestants, friars fled; granted to the Earl of Thomond c.1568, assigned to William Crow	Ros-cré; Ruiscre
Roscrea Monastery		founded 7th century by St Cronan; Augustinian Canons founded c.1140, canons possibly introduced by St Malachy 1140-8; diocesan cathedral 1152; became parochial apparently c.1195 when diocese united to Killaloe	
St Peakaun Monastery		early monastic site, possibly founded before the time of Becan; (re?)founded by St Abban	Cluain-ard-mobecoc; Kilpeacon; Pekaun
Senros Monastery		early monastic site	Sean Ros nr Monaincha
Shanrahan Monastery		early monastic site, possibly founded before c.637 by St Cataldus	Sean-raithin
Templemore Abbey		Knights Templar, stationed here, purportedly occupying the castle	
Terryglass Monastery		early monastic site, founded before 549 by St Colum "Mac Cremthainn"; burned 1112 and 1164	Tir-da-glas; Tir
Thurles Friary		Carmelite Friars founded c.1291-1300 by the Butler family; dissolved 1540, when already ruinous; granted to Thomas, Earl of Ormond and Ossory 1557, friars remaining in the vicinity; listed as a restored convent existing c.1737	
Thurles Greyfriars		Franciscan Friars probable post-medieval establishment	
Thurles Preceptory		purported Knights Templar, who occupied the castle, with another fortress ascribed to them traditionally Knights Hospitaller	
Tipperary Friary		Augustinian Friars founded c.1300?, possibly by Stephen Butler; dissolved 1539, surrendered by Prior Donough O'Cuyrke (O'Quirk) 7 April 1539, by which time ruinous; granted to Dermot Ryan of Tipperary 1541	Tiobrain-arann; Tioprat-arann; Tipra-arann; Tiperary
Toomyvara Priory		early monastic site, purportedly founded 6th or 7th/8th century by St Donan 407; Augustinian Canons Regular priory cell, dependent on Monaincha; founded 1140; dissolved before 1585; granted to Milned Magrath, Archbishop of Cashel, 30 December 1585	St Donan; St Mary ____________________; Tuaim-ui-mheadhra; Thomedonyn; Tamdonayn; Theym; Toem; Toome
Tullamain Monastery		early monastic site; plundered 1026	

Return to top of page

==== County Waterford ====
(For references and location detail see List of monastic houses in County Waterford)

Foundation	Image	Communities & Provenance	Formal Name or Dedication & Alternative Names
Achad-crimthain Monastery ^{~}		early monastic site, founded before 829; possibly located in County Waterford	
Achad-dagain Monastery ^{~}		early monastic site, founded before 639	
Ardmore Cathedral		early monastic site, Gaelic monks, founded in the 5th century by St Declan; diocesan cathedral 1152; see united with Lismore after 1210?	St Declan's Church
Ardmore Friary ^{~?}		Augustinian Friars	
Ballyvoony Preceptory		purported Knights Templar "Monastery (in ruins)" (Note: Ordnance Survey)	
Bewley Camera		purported Knights Templar foundation unknown; dissolution unknown; remains of monastic building 1774; "Abbey" (Note: Ordnance Survey)	Beaulieu; Beal
Cappagh Preceptory ^{ø}		purported Knights Hospitaller remains probably not ecclesiastical	Ceapach
Carrickbeg Friary		Franciscan Friars Minor, Conventual founded 1336 by James Butler, Earl of Desmond; dissolved 1540, surrendered by 'Prior' William Cormoke 7 April 1540; granted to Thomas, Earl of Ormond; the friars returned in 1669, a new church was built in 1822 which remained in use until 2006 when the friary was closed.	
Cathair-mac-conchaid Monastery ^{~}		early monastic site, founded by the 7th century	Cathair-mic-conaich
Clashmore Monastery		early monastic site, founded before 646-56 by Cuancheir, a monk, on the instruction of St Mochoemoc of Leamakevoge	Glaismor
Crooke Preceptory		Knights Templar founded before 1180, by the Barons of Curroghmore?; manor granted by Henry II; dissolved 1308-11; Knights Hospitaller founded after 1314; dissolved after 1348; later farmed out; held by William Wyse by 1541	An Crusc; Cruadach; Cork; Croc
Curraheen Friary		Franciscan Friars — from Youghal placed of settlement after the suppression; in vicinity 1731	Keeran
Disert-nairbre Monastery		early monastic site, cell founded by St Medoc of Ferns	Bolhendesert; Dysert?; Ballindysart?
Dungarvan Monastery		early monastic site, founded in the 7th century by St Garvan	Dun Garbhan
Dungarvan Priory		Augustinian Friars founded c.1290 by Thomas, Lord Offaly; dissolved 1541; church found to be parochial by 19 January 1541; leased to Roger Dalton 1595	Dun Garbhan
Dungarvan, St Augustine's Priory *		Augustinian Friars extant	
Kilbarry Preceptory		Knights Templar founded before 1180, church granted by deed of Henry II; dissolved 1308-11; Knights Hospitaller founded after 1514; dissolved before 1527, farmed out	Cell-barra
Killbunny Monastery		early monastic site	Cell-bhunna
Kilculliheen Abbey		Augustinian nuns — Arroasian dependent on St Mary de Hogges, Dublin; priory founded 1151 by Dermot Mac Murrough, King of Leinster; independent, raised to abbey status before 1257; dissolved 1540, surrendered by Abbess Isabella Mothing granted to Sir Edmund Butler 1566; granted to the town of Waterford 1582-3	Cell-cleeheen; Kellinge; Killaylyhin; Kylkyllin; de Bello Portu
Killongford Preceptory?		by tradition Knights Templar also erroneously given as Knights of St John of Jerusalem (Note: Mervyn Archdall, Monasticon Hibernicum, 1786)	Killunkert
Kilmacleague Monastery		early monastic site, founded in the 5th century by St Mac Liag, disciple of St Declan of Ardmore	Cell-mic-liag
Kilmolash Monastery		early monastic site, founded by St Molaise (of Leighlin?); plundered by the Norsemen 833	Cell-o-laise
Lismore Cathedral ^{=+}		early monastic site, founded 636 by St Carthach (Mo-chuda); diocesan cathedral 1111; see united to Waterford 1362; early monastic site, nuns; Augustinian Friars	St Carthagh; ____________________; Leasa-moir; Liss-mor; Les-mor
Lismore Monastery		early monastic site, nuns, founded in the 7th century, strictly separate from the monks' monastery (see immediately above)	
Lismore — St Brigid's Hospital		early leper hospital under a prior, with possible Culdee connections until the 12th century;	St Brigid
Little Island Monastery ^{~}		early monastic site, possibly located in County Wexford	Inisdoimle, County Wexford?
Molana Abbey		early monastic site, founded in the 6th century by St Molanfide (Maelanfaid); Augustinian Canons Regular founded after 1140?; dissolved 1541; granted to Sir Walter Raleigh 1587?; passed to others 1588	Ailen-mail-anfaid; Dairinis Mael-anfaid; Insula St Molanfiede; Moel-anfaidh; Maylanfay; Melahanahyd; Muyllhanuha
Mothel Abbey		early monastic site, founded in the 6th century by St Brogan; early monastery asserted by some to have become Cistercian (Note: James Ware, De Hibernia, et Antiquitatibus ejus, edition of 1654, p.196); Augustinian Canons Regular founded after 1140? dissolved 1540, surrendered by Abbot Edmund Power 7 April 1540; church found to be parochial by 19 January 1541; occupied by Lary Katherine Butler 1548; (NM)	Maothail; Motalia; Mothil; SS Brogan and Cronan; at Ballynevin
Mount Melleray Abbey		Cistercian monks founded 1833	
Rincrew Abbey, Rincrew Hill		Knights Templar founded c.1180?, purportedly by Raymond Le Gros; dissolved 1308? 330; traditionally/erroneously Knights Hospitaller; Augustinian Canons Regular passed to Molana; dissolved with Molana 1541; granted to Sir Walter Raleigh 1587; assigned to the Earl of Cork	Temple Michael; Rhincrew; Rin-Crioch; Rinncru; Ryncrowe
Stradbally Abbey ^{ø}		erroneously asserted Augustinian Friars; "Abbey" ruins (Note: Richard Hopkins Ryland, The History, Topography and Antiquities of the County and City of Waterford ..., p.301) non-monastic	
Tallow Carmelite Monastery		Carmelite nuns	St Joseph
Waterford Cathedral		monastic episcopal cathedral founded 1096; diocesan cathedral 1111; see united to Lismore 1363	Cell-mic-liag; Port Lairge
Waterford — St Catherine's Priory		Augustinian Canons Regular — Victorine founded before 1207 by Elias Fitz Norman; dissolved 1539, surrendered by Prior Edmund Power; occupied by James Shurloke, per James White; granted to Lady Elizabeth Butler, alias Sherlock, 1588-9; Augustinian Friars apparently refounded 1629	St Catherine ____________________; St Catherine's Abbey
Waterford — St John's Priory Hospital		Benedictine monks founded c.1190 Benedictine monks and nuns from 1202; cell dependent on Bath from 1204; dissolved 1536; granted to William Wise November 1536	St John the Evangelist
Waterford — St Saviour's Priory		Dominican Friars community founded 1226; approval for priory granted by Henry III 1235 dissolved 1540; church sold to James White, occupier, by 18 January 1541; surrendered by Prior William Marten 2 April 1541; granted to Sir Anthony St Leger; Waterford Dominican community died out 1865; restored 1867	St Saviour
Waterford Greyfriars		Franciscan Friars Minor, Conventual founded 1240-5 by Sir Hugh Purcell, buried here; Observant Franciscan Friars reformed 1521; dissolved 1540, surrendered by 'Prior' John Linche 2 April 1540; granted to Patrick Walshe and to the brethren and poor of the Hospital of the Holy Spirit 1 September 1541; hospital established in the church — continuing into the 19th century	
Waterford Greyfriars, later site		Franciscan Friars founded 1612	
Waterford Franciscan Friary *		Franciscan Friars founded 1830; church completed 1834; extant	

Return to top of page

==== County Westmeath ====
(For references and location detail see List of monastic houses in County Westmeath)

Foundation	Image	Communities & Provenance	Formal Name or Dedication & Alternative Names
Ardcharn Monastery ^{≈}		early monastic site — actually located in County Roscommon	Ardcharn in Westmeath
Ardnacrany Friary		Carmelite Friars founded c.1291 by Robert Dillon, Lord of Drumrany, possibly without license; (erroneously purported Dominican Friars) possibly the house licensed 1329; dissolved c.1540; granted to Robert Dillon 1546 friars re-established in Moate	Ardicarne; Athnecarne
Athlone Priory		Cluniac monks — possibly from France traditionally founded c.1150 by Turlough O'Conor, High King of Ireland; in existence before 1208-10; dissolved c.1542, before 1567; granted to Sir Richard Bingham, Commissioner for Galway, c.1589	St Peter; SS Peter and Paul ____________________; Athluain; Baile-ath-luain; Blahluin; Haulon; de Innocentia
Athlone Franciscan Friary *		Franciscan Friars founded c.1723; extant	
Athlone Friary		Franciscan Friars Minor, Conventual founded c.1239 by Charles de Burgo or the Dillon family (possibly Sir Henry Dillon) or the Digby family (earlier attribution of founding 1224 by Cathal Crovderg O'Conor dubious); church consecrated 1241; dissolved 1567-8: destroyed; friars probably remained in the community in the town; Observant Franciscan Friars reformed 1587; moved to place of refuge at Killinure, infra; new house built nearby (see immediately below)	Athluain; Baile-ath-luain; Blahluin; Haulon
Athlone Greyfriars		Observant Franciscan Friars founded 1626	
Athlone Monastery		early monastic site according to tradition (historically County Roscommon)	Athluain; Baile-ath-luain; Blahluin; Haulon; Cloonowen? County Roscommon
Athlone Austin Friary		Augustinian Friars (Note: Lubin: Louis Augustin Alemand, Monasticon Hibernicum, translated and edited by John Stevens, 1722, pp.310,312,331) founded on the Roscommon side of Athlone	Athluain; Baile-ath-luain; Blahluin; Haulon
Athlone Convent		Poor Clares nuns founded between c.1725 and c.1750	Athluain; Baile-ath-luain; Blahluin; Haulon
Athnecarne Friary ^{≈}		Dominican Friars — confusion of Ardnacrany Carmelites, supra	Ardnacrany
Ballyboggan Priory		Augustinian Canons Regular dissolved; granted to Sir William Bermingham 1541	The Priory Church of the Holy Trinity, Ballyboggan ____________________; De Laude Dei
Ballymore Priory		Augustinian Canons Regular founded c.1250?; possibly connected to Tristernagh, and possible chaplains to Cistercian nuns (see immediately below); dissolved 1540, church ruinous; leased to Francis Shaen 1593	Baile-mor-locha-semhdidhe; Loch-seudi; Loch-sydy; Lox; Plare; Plary Abbey
Ballymore Priory		Cistercian nuns founded 1218 by a de Lacy; suggested, probably erroneously, by the presence of the Canons' priory in the vicinity (see immediately above) to have been a Gilbertine double monastery; dissolved 1470; Augustinian Canons — from Ballymore (see immediately above); passed to the canons 1475, who possibly transferred here	St Mary ____________________; Loughsewdy; Loch-seudi; Loch-sydy; Lox; Plare
Ballymore Abbey		early monastic site, purportedly founded c.700 (Note: A. Cogan, The Diocese of Meath, 1862-70, ii, p.552)	Baile-mor-locha-semhdidhe; Loch-seudi; Loch-sydy; Lox; Plare
Ballymore Cistercian Priory ^{≈}		erroneous record of Cistercian monks — actually the canons' priory, supra	Baile-mor-locha-semhdidhe; Loch-seudi; Loch-sydy; Lox; Plare
Bethlehem Convent		Poor Clares nuns founded between c.1725 and c.1750	Bethlem
Butvather Friary ^{≈}		Franciscan Friars, First Order probably Athlone Conventual Franciscan Friary	Bukrather-Brawny; Butvather, in Brawny
Castletown Abbey ^{ø}		"Abbey", (Note: Ordnance Survey) non-monastic ruins	Baile-chaislean
Church Island Monastery, Lough Owel		early monastic site, reputedly founded by St Lomman	Inis-mor
Clonfad Monastery		early monastic site, possibly founded 6th century by St Colmcille; in existence 779	Cluain-fodae; Cluain-fota-baitan; Cluain-fota-baedan-aba; Cluain-fota-bile; Ecra Tulach
Clonfad Monastery		early monastic site, presumably founded 6th century by St Finnian of Clonard; church burned 887	Cluain-fodae; Cluain-fota-libren; Cluain-fota-fine
Cluain-moescnae Monastery ^{~}		early monastic site	Cluain-maosena; Cluain-mhaoscna; Cluain-mecsua
Collinstown Priory		Augustinian nuns — Arroasian dependent on Clonard founded after 1144, church confirmed to the nuns of Clonard; dissolved after 1195; transferred with Clonard to Odder c.1383-4	St Mary ____________________; Kellarthalgach; Fore St Mary; Fawor
Conry Monastery		early monastic site, founded 7th century?	Combraire
Druim-corcortri Monastery ^{~}		early monastic site, founded 5th century by St Patrick for Diarmait — possibly located in County Westmeath	Druim-corcthri; Druim-corkaree; Druim-corcortri, in Meath
Drumraney Monastery		early monastic site, hermitage founded before 588; in existence 995	Druim-raite; Drumrath
Dysart Tola		early monastic site, founded before 738 by St Tola; burned by Domhnall mac Murchadh 790	Disert-tuala; Disert-tola
Faughalstown Monastery		early monastic site, patronised by St Diarmaid 6th century	Caille-fohlada; Fochlaidh; Faughly
Fooran Priory		Franciscan? nuns, possibly Second Order, Poor Clare nuns founded before 1385?; dissolved before 1603 (during the reign of Queen Elizabeth?; ruinous by 1605	Farren; Farren Macheigkese
Fooran Friary		Franciscan Friars, probably Third Order Regular ruinous by 1605	Fuaran; Farrenemannagh
Fore Anchorite's Cell		Anchorites dissolved 1616 on the death of the last hermit	
Fore Priory		early monastic site, founded c. 630 by St Feichin; probably dissolved c.1180, when succeeded by the Benedictine establishment, (see immediately below); recorded 13th century coarbs possibly titular; suggested Augustinian Canons Regular c.12th century — evidence lacking	Fobhar; Fobar-fechin; Ballyleabhair; Foure
Fore Priory		Benedictine monks alien priory: dependent on Evreux; founded before 1185, churches and other endowments granted to Evereux by Hugh de Lacy; buildings incorporated into the town's fortifications 1428; became denizen: independent from 1449; dissolved 1539, surrendered by Prior William Nugent, 27 November 1539; granted to Matthew King 1540; (NM)	SS Taurin and Fechin
Fore Hospitallers		Knights Hospitaller frankhouse recorded 1541	
Foyran Monastery		early monastic site, patronised and probably founded by St Edan	
Friarstown Friary		Dominican Friars founded c.1691; dissolved 1733	Killenough; (Note: Rev. Dr. W. Moran, Riocht na Midhe, ii, No.3 (1961), pp.9-15); Killendough; Killenough; — in Clonfad parish
Hare Island Priory		early monastic site, founded before 542 by St Ciaran of Clonmacnois; Augustinian Canons Regular founded after 1140?; cell dependent on Saints' Island? from before 1259?; dissolved before 1500?, probably abandoned some time before the general suppression	Inis Ainghin; Inish Inneen; Oilean Aingin; Saints Island, Lough Ree
Inchbofin		early monastic site, founded mid-5th century by St Rioch; burned and plundered by the Norsemen on several occasions; church plundered by the Munstermen 1089; suggested Augustinian Canons Regular during the reign of Henry VIII — documentary evidence lacking	Inis-bofin; Inis-boffin, Lough Ree
Inchmore Priory		early monastic site, founded 5th century? by Liberius (Lioban), son of Losenus; Augustinian Canons Regular founded before c.1170?; cell? dependent on Saints' Island after 1200; dissolved before 1500?, possibly abandoned some time before the general suppression; granted to Sir Richard Barnwell	Inismor-Loch-Ribh; Inismor-Lough Ree
Kilbeggan Monastery		early monastic site, founded 6th/7th century by St Beccan (Becan, son of Murchade?); Cistercian monks — from Mellifont founded 1150, possibly by the MacCoughlan family; subject to Buildwas 1228; dissolved before 1549; part granted to Robert Dillon 1560; granted to William Browne 1595	Cell-becain; Kilbecain; de Benedicto Dei; 'The Church of the Relic', Kilbeggan
Kilbixy Monastery		early monastic site, monks (Note: Healy, History of the Diocese of Meath, 1, 48) and nuns founded by St Bicsech the Virgin?	Cell-bicsige
Kilcumreragh Monastery		early monastic site, reputedly founded by St Fiachra; sometimes confused with Conry, supra	Cell-cruimthir
Kilkenny West Priory Hospital		early monastic site, founded c.mid-6th century by St Canice; Crutched Friars founded after 1200 by the Tyrrell family or by Fr Thomas Dillon, priest, buried here; listed 15th century as Hospitallers dissolved before 1541?; granted to Robert Dillon 1569	St John ____________________; Cell-cainnig; Kil-caynne; Kil-kencayd; Kil-kay; Kil-kykenne
Killalea Monastery ^{~}		early monastic site, sometimes mistaken for Killulagh, supra	
Killare Monastery		early monastic site, founded by St Aedh mac Bricc; site now occupied by remains of old parish church	Cell-air; Kill-aria
Killinure Friary ^{~}		Observant Franciscan Friars — from Athlone place of refuge	
Killucan Monastery		early monastic site, founded by St Luican (Lucain)	Cell-lucain; Killuken
Killulagh Monastery		early monastic site, patronised 5th century (during the time of St Patrick) by St Lonan; also given as County Offaly, and mistaken for Killalea	Cell-oilach; Cell-uaillech; Kilhuailleach, County Offaly
Kiltoom Monastery		early monastic site, founded 5th century	Cell-toma; Kill-toma
Kinard Nunnery		monks, according to local tradition — order and foundation unknown; land granted to Augustinian Canons Regular of Tristernagh 1293; Franciscan Sisters, Third Order founded before 1650	Ceannard; Chinn-Aird; Kenard; Kinnard; Mainister Chinn Aird
Lackan Monastery		early monastic site, founded 5th century? possibly by St Patrick?; possibly in existence 946; remains extant 1837	Leachan; Lecan-midi; Leckin
Lough Ennell Monastery		details to be established	
Lynn Monastery		early monastic site; some confusion with Linnleire (Lann-Leire), i.e. Dunleer, supra; site currently occupied by Lynn House	Lann-mic-luachain
Mullingar Austin Friars		Augustinian Friars; site marked by modern statue	
Mullingar Priory		Augustinian Canons Regular founded c.1227 by Ralph Petit, Bishop of Meath; destroyed by the people of Managh 1464; leased out by Prior John Petyt 1534-8; dissolved 1539, surrendered by Prior John Petyt 28 November 1539; possibly Augustinian Friars founded before 1643?	Muilenn-cerr; Muileann-chear; Molingar; Molyngerre
Mullingar Friary		Dominican Friars founded 1237 or Mary 1238 by the Nugent family or the Pettit family; granted to Sir Gerald FitzGerald of Crowboy for 21 years, 24 April 1540; declared dissolved 10 October 1540 by the withdrawal of the prior and convent; granted to Thomas Gorie 1564; granted to Walter Hope 1565-6; granted to James Hope 1610	St Mary of the Assumption; The Holy Trinity; St Saviour
Mullingar Blackfriars		Dominican Friars founded soon after 1622	
Mullingar Greyfriars		Franciscan Friars — from Multyfarnham attempted foundation 1622	
Mullingar Greyfriars		Capuchin Franciscan Friars founded c.1642?	
Mullingar Hospitallers		Knights Hospitaller "... a house [of Hospitallers?]"; (Note: Extents of Irish Monastic Possessions 1540-1, edited Newport D. White (Irish Manuscripts Commission), 1943, p.115) ^{(}^{)} probably a frankhouse	Molyngare
Multyfarnham Friary *		Franciscan Friars, Conventual founded 1236 (before 1268?) (during the reign of Henry III) by William Delmar; also given as 1270 or 1276 by L William Herebeard FitzHerbert (Delamare) and 1306 (Note: A. Cogan, The Diocese of Meath, 1862-70, iii, p.591); Observant Franciscan Friars reformed 1460; dissolved 1540, abandoned by the friars 7 October 1540; granted to Edmund Field, Patrick Clynch and Philip Penteney sometime between 1540 and 1546 (renewed 1546) friars permitted to remain in occupation; recommended for restoration 1540 (during the reign of Queen Mary); in use as a place of refuge; burned twice and raided several times between 1590 and 1617; reoccupied 1827	Mbuailtibh Farannain; Molinfarnam; Montisfernandi; Multifernam
Multyfarnham Blackfriars, earlier site?		Dominican Friars suggested to have been here prior to moving to Mullingar — evidence lacking	
Pass of Kilbride Abbey		"Abbey ruins" (Note: Ordnance Survey and Memorial Atlas of Ireland, 1901)	Bealach-Chilli-Brighde
Rahugh Monastery		early monastic site founded before 589 by St Aedh mac Bricc, bishop; in existence 859	Rath-aeda-mic-bric; Raith-aida; Rathugh
Rathaspick Monastery ^{~}		early monastic site, purportedly founded before 589 by Aedh mac Bricc — evidence lacking; in existence 898	
Russagh Monastery ^{ø≈}		possible early monastic site — probably Russagh, County Laois	Ros-ach; Ros each
Taughmon Monastery		early monastic site, founded before 635-6 by St Fintan Munna	Tech-munna; Taghmon
Teaghbaithen Monastery ^{ø≈~}		early monastic site — possibly Tibhoin, County Roscommon	Taghboyne
Teernacreeve Monastery		early monastic site, possibly founded 6th century by St Colmcille for St Lugaid, his disciple	St Lugaid? ____________________; Tir-da-chroeb; Tir-da-craeb
Temple Macateer		early monastic site, possibly founded by St Ciaran mac an tsaoir	Tempall-maic-in-tsaeir
Templenesagart Friary ^{≈}		friars, apparently Franciscan Friars, probably Third Order Regular	Templenesgarth; possibly Kinard
Tobercormick Priory?		Augustinian Canons Regular (Note: Harris's Table, Ware-Harris, Antiquities, p.264) possible canons' house probably extinct long before 1488 Dominican 200	Tobar-Cormac; Fons Cormaci; Well of Cormac by Toberville
Tobercormick Friary ^{#}		Dominican Friars founded c.1488, license granted by Innocent III, at the petition of Edmund de Lantu, to build a friary 1488; dissolved before 1589, when in ownership of Francis Shane, gent.; granted to H. Matthews, termor; assigned to Sir Francis Shane; no monastic remains apparent	
Tristernagh Priory		Augustinian Canons Regular founded c.1200 by Geoffrey de Constentin (Galfred de Constantine); dissolved 1539, surrendered by Prior commendator Edmund Nugent, Bishop of Kilmore; granted to Robert Delman 10 December 1539 later in religious use; destroyed 1783	St Mary ____________________; Dristernach; Dryssternac; apud Kilbixy
Tuaim-inbhir Monastery ^{~≈}		early monastic site, founded before 916, possibly located in County Westmeath or County Tipperary	Druim-inbir (Dromineer, County Tipperary)
Turbotstown Monastery ^{~}		early monastic site, founded before 809, possibly by St Fechin	Tibraid; Tibrada; Tippert?
Tyfarnham Monastery ^{~}		early monastic site, founded before 880	Tech-erennain; Tech-airindan; Tech-farannain; Tech-ernain; Tech-ultan; Teach Faramain
Usnagh Monastery ^{~}		early monastic site, a cloister founded 5th century by St Patrick; demolished when he was driven away	Uisnach

Return to top of page

==== County Wexford ====
(For references and location detail see List of monastic houses in County Wexford)

Foundation	Image	Communities & Provenance	Formal Name or Dedication & Alternative Names
Ahacortensis Friary ^{≈}		possible duplication of Enniscorthy or Annaghdown; Augustinian Canons Regular (if Enniscorthy, infra); Augustinian Friars	Enniscorthy?; Annaghdown?, County Galway
Arbrensis Monastery ^{≈}		early monastic site, possibly located in County Wexford	
Ardamine Monastery		early monastic site, founded by St Maedoc of Ferns, granted to St Maedoc by Dyma	?Ardladrann; Ardlabran
Ardcavan Monastery ^{#}		early monastic site, founded 7th century? by St Coeman mac Colman, or Colmad, brother of St Degan?; plundered 819; erenagh land into mid-11th century	Airdne-Coemhain; Ardne-Coemhain; Dairinis Coembain
Ardcolm Monastery		early monastic site, founded 6th century by St Colmcille	Airdne-coluim
Ballyhack Preceptory		Knights Hospitaller founded before 1212; dissolved after 1375, merged with Kilcloggan; now the site of Ballyhack Castle	Balicauk
Ballynaleek Monastery		early monastic site, founded by St Mael Ruain of Tallaght?	St Mael Ruain of Tallaght _____________________; Ballinaleck
Begerin Priory		early monastic site and school, founded 5th century by St Ibar; dissolved 1160; Benedictine monks priory cell dependent on Exeter founded 1181; dissolved 1400 transferred to Augustinian Canons Regular of Selskar — though no record of cell here	Becc-eriu; Begeire; Beggerin
Camaross Monastery		early monastic site, founded 6th century by St Abban	Camacross; Camros
Carnsore Monastery		early monastic site, Gaelic monks, founded before 585 by St Vogue (Veoc?)	
Clonatin Priory		Augustinian Canons Regular; Romanesque ruins purported to be cell of Ferns Abbey	
Clonmines Friary		Augustinian Friars founded 1317; dissolved 1539, surrendered by Prior Nicholas Wadding; granted to Laurence Newell (Nevill) 1 May 1540 granted to John Parker 1543, who had licence to alienate 1546 friars expelled 1544, and roamed the countryside for the next three centuries; erroneously purported transferred to Dominican Friars	Clomin; Granstown
Clonmore Monastery		early monastic site, founded by St Maedoc of Ferns	Cluain-mor-dicholla-gairb
Coolgraney Friary		possible Augustinian Friars; site probably occupied by St Austin's church, Inch	
Down Priory		Augustinian Canons Regular founded before 1170, purportedly by the Danes; (Note: Louis Augustin Alemand, Monasticum Hibernicum, translated and edited by John Stevens, 1722) dissolved c.1567; leased to Thomas Stewcley 1567; held by Richard Maisterson 1608	Abbeydown; Downing; Dune; Dunum
Druim-chaoin-cellaig		early monastic site, founded 6th century by St Abban	Druim-cair-ceallaig
Dunbrody Abbey		Cistercian monks — from St Mary's, Dublin dependent on St Mary's, Dublin; founded 1182, land granted to the abbot and monks of Buildwas by Hervé de Monte Marisco 1171-2, confirmed by his nephew, Strongbow; dissolved 6 May 1536; granted to Sir Osbert Itchingham who apparently never resided there, monks purportedly remained in occupation until they abandoned the priory c.1560?	de Portu St Mariae; St Mariae; de Portu; Dunbroith; Dunbrot
Dunbrody Priory ^{ø}		purported Benedictine monks — evidence lacking	
Enniscorthy Priory		mission house or chapel founded c.510 by St Senan of Scattery; Augustinian Canons Regular — Victorine dependent on St Thomas's, Dublin; cell founded before 1229; dissolved 1539; leased to Edward Spenser 1581; passed to Richard Synnott 1582; granted to Edward Eustace 1593; passed to Sir Henry Wallop 1595; held by Thomas, Earl of Ormond 1605	St John the Evangelist ____________________; Inis-corthadh; Inis-corty; Inis-choy; St John's
Enniscorthy Abbey		Franciscan Friars Minor, Conventual founded 1460 by Donal, Fuscus (Donal Reagh Cavanagh); Observant Franciscan Friars reformed c.1460 by Dermit (O Murchu); dissolved 1539; granted to James, Earl of Ormond; destroyed by Henry Wallop 1582; granted to Sir Henry Wallop	
Ferns Abbey		Augustinian Canons Regular — Arroasian founded c.1160-2 by Dermot Mac Murrough, King of Leinster, buried here; burned 1159 or 1166; rebuilt by Dermot 1169; plundered and burned by Scottish raiders and Irish rebels c.1317 dissolved 1538, abbot and canons left the abbey 31 March 1538; granted to Thomas Alen 25 March 1538	St Mary ____________________; Fearna-nor-Maedhog; Ferna-nor-Maedhog; Fernis
Ferns Cathedral		early monastic site, founded c.6th/7th century by St Aidan or M'Aedhoc (Mogue), first bishop of Ferns; diocesan cathedral 1111	
Ferns — St Aidan’s Monastery of Adoration		Family of Adoration nuns founded 1990, on the site of a parochial church (built 1826) demolished 1970s	St Aidan
Fethard Abbey		early monastic site, founded 6th century by St Abban, patronized by St Maedoc	Fiodh-ard; Fetherde
Fethard Friary ^{≈ø}		Augustinian Friars possible duplication of Fethard, County Tipperary	Fetherde; Fethard, County Tipperary?
Finachia Cell ^{~}		Augustinian Canons Regular possible hermit's cell on land endowed to Ferns, possibly located in County Wexford	Cell Finnmagi?
Finnmag Monastery ^{~}		early monastic site, founded 6th century by St Abban	Fionmagh
Glascarrig Priory		Tironensian monks made dependent on St Dogmael's, Wales by Griffin Condon, David Roch and others; founded after 1190 (1190 or 1199); dissolved 1541; church found to be parochial 27 January 1541; leased to Walter Pepard of Kilca 1550; abandoned after 1550, last prior in office until 1558	St Mary ____________________; Glascharrac; Glascarrick
Grantstown Priory		Augustinian Canons Regular founded 1317	
Horetown Friary		Carmelite Friars founded 1350-87? by the Furlong family, possibly Philip Furlong; dissolved before 1541?; granted to Sir John Davis, assigned to Francis Talbot; friars remained in the district, convent existing c.1737	Hoartown; Little Horetown
Inisbeg Monastery ^{~}		early monastic site, founded 5th century? (by the time of St Patrick)	Beg-erin?
Inisdoimle Monastery		early monastic site, founded by St Bairrfhinn, son of Aed, Prince of Dublin; plundered a number of times between 820 and 960	Inis-daimle; Inis-teimple; Inch?
Inisfail Monastery ^{~}		early monastic site, founded 5th century by St Patrick, to whom land was granted by Cremthann	Inis-feal; Beg-erin?
Kilbraney Abbey		Franciscan Friars, purportedly Third Order Regular	Abbey Kilbraney; Abbeybraney
Kilcloggan Preceptory		Knights Templar founded after 1183 (during the reign of King John) by the O'More family, possibly Connor O'More; dissolved 1308-10; Knights Hospitaller founded after 1314; dissolved 1540; leased to James Sherlock of Waterford	Kilcloghan; Templetown
Kilgorman Monastery		early monastic site, founded 5th century?	Cell-gormain
Kilnamanagh Monastery		early monastic site	Kilmanagh
Lady's Island Priory		Augustinian Canons Regular possible cell of Ferns prior to 14th century; purportedly Augustinian Friars dissolved 17th century? (in the time of Cromwell?)	Our Lady (purportedly)
New Ross Priory, earlier site		Franciscan Friars Minor, Conventual transferred to later site (see immediately below) before 1295, probably between 1250 and 1256;	
New Ross Priory		early monastic site, founded 6th century by St Abban; Crutched Friars founded c.1195, probably by William Marshall, Earl of Pembroke; dissolved before 1295; Franciscan Friars Minor, Conventual refounded c.1250 (during the reign of Edward I), purportedly by Sir John Devereaux; transferred from earlier site (see immediately above) before 1295; Crutched Friars appear to have attempted to regain the site from the Franciscans 15th century; dissolved 1540; granted to the Earl of Ormond; assigned to Jasper Duffe; friars evicted 1549-50; suppressed 1558, destroyed by the Protestants; apparently reoccupied during the reign of Queen Mary; Observant Franciscan Friars reformed 1612	St Saviour
New Ross Grey Friars		Observant Franciscan Friars built 1615	Ros-mic-treoin; Ross-meic-treoin; Ross-pont
New Ross Franciscan Nunnery		Franciscan sisters, Third Order Regular founded between 1625 and 1650	
New Ross Austin Friars		Augustinian Friars founded before 1320, purportedly by Wiliam de la Roche; Observant Augustinian Friars reformed 1484?; dissolved 1540; sold to Margaret, Countess of Ormond and Ossory; leased to John Savage 19 August 1540; granted to Richard Butler of Dormereston 16 January 1544; friars later returned to New Ross (see immediately below)	
New Ross Austin Friars *		Augustinian Friars extant	
New Ross, St Mary's Abbey		Anglo-Norman abbey parish church; suggested episcopal diocesan cathedral, Patrick Barrett, Bishop of Ferns, purportedly translated his see to St Mary's church 1400 to 1415 — references probably only pertain to the bishop's residence	Monastery of St Saviour
New Ross, Mount Carmel Monastery		Carmelite nuns	
Pill Friary ^{~}		Franciscan Friars, Third Order Regular foundation unknown; dissolved before 1603 (during the reign of Queen Elizabeth) 274	Pillam
Rathaspick Monastery		early monastic site	Raith-ne-n-epscop
Rosslare Priory		Augustinian Canons Regular	
St Saviour's Priory ^{~≈?}		Cistercian monks dependent on Dunbrody; possibly located in County Wexford; possible confusion with Graiguenamanagh	St Salvator
Selskar Priory		Augustinian Canons Regular — Holy Sepulchre? purportedly founded c.1190 by Sir Alexander de la Roche, after 1216?; dissolved 1540, surrendered by Prior John Heigharne 23 March 1540; occupied by Sir Walter Browne of Malrankan before 1548; granted to John Parker 1548; Augustinian Friars	The Priory of SS Peter and Paul of Selsker by Wexford ____________________; Wexford Priory; Loch-Garman; Loch-Carmen; Weysford; Veyesereford; Viesercford
Skreen Priory ^{~ø}		Benedictine monks granted to the monks of St Nicholas, Exeter — never a monastic cell	St Nicholas
Taghmon Monastery		Augustinian Canons Regular	
Templeshanbo Monastery		early monastic site, founded 6th century by St Maedoc	Seanboth-Colmain; Senboth-Colmain; Senboth-sine
Tintern Abbey		Cistercian monks dependent on Tintern, Monmouthshire; founded 1200 by Wiliam Marshall, Earl of Pembroke; dissolved 1536; monks apparently permitted to remain until after 1539?; abbey seized 25 July 1539; church found to be parochial 22 January 1541; variously leased out; church converted for use as a castle or mansion	Tintern parva; de Voto
Wexford Friary		Franciscan Friars Minor, Conventual founded before 1268? (during the reign of Henry III), attributed to the Geraldine family; Observant Franciscan Friars reformed 1486; dissolved 1539-40; granted to Paul Turner and James Devereux 1544; occupied by Thomas Browne and Paul Turnor [Turner] 1548; destroyed by the Protestants 1560; abandoned until new house established 1615 (see immediately below)	Lough Garman
Wexford Greyfriars		Observant Franciscan Friars founded 1615	
Wexford Nunnery		nuns founded after 1625	
Wexford Templars		Knights Templar granted church of St Alloch, mills and land by Henry II	

Return to top of page

==== County Wicklow ====
(For references and location detail see List of monastic houses in County Wicklow)

Foundation	Image	Communities & Provenance	Formal Name or Dedication & Alternative Names
Aghowle Monastery		early monastic site, founded by St Finnian of Clonard; in existence 1017, erenaghs at least to 1050	Achad-abhall; Achag-abla; Aghold
Arklow Abbey		Cistercian monks — from Wyresdale; founded before 1204; dissolved 1205, transferred to Abington	Arcloa; Arkelo; Envermor; Invermor
Arklow Priory		Dominican Friars founded 1264 by Thomas Theobald fitz Walter, Pincerna (Butler) of Ireland, buried here; dissolved 1539; granted to John Travers 1544	The Holy Cross; The True Cross
Ballinabarny Friary ^{~}		Franciscan Friars, First Order founded before 1650	
Ballykine Monastery		early monastic site, purportedly founded by a brother of St Kevin; private residence named Whaley Abbey built on site	Baile-coemgen
Baltinglass Abbey		Cistercian monks — from Mellifont founded 1148 by Dermot Mac Murrough; briefly dependent on Furness 1277; dissolved 1536; granted to Sir Edmond Butler 1536; converted into a private house and Protestant church; abandoned 1883; (NM)	Belachconglais; Vallis Salutis
Bray Monastery		early monastic house, bishops recorded	Brae; Bree
Delgany Carmelite Monastery		Carmelite nuns	
Delgany Monastery		early monastic site, possibly founded by St Coemgen of Glendalough, or by (or for) St Mogoroc (Chuarog)	Deilgne-mochorog; Dergne
Ennereilly Monastery		early monastic site, founded before 639	Inber-daoille; Inber-daele; Inber-daga; Inverdoil
Ennisboyne Monastery		early monastic site	
Ferrybank Abbey		Cistercian monks	
Glendalough Cathedral and Monastery		early monastic site, founded 6th century by St Kevin (Coemgen); diocesan cathedral 1111; burned 1163; Augustinian Canons Regular abbeyfounded after 1163?; merged with Dublin 1216; Augustinian Canons Regular — Arroasian priory founded before 1306; dissolved 1398?, burned by the English;	St Kevin ____________________; Glen-da-locha; Glinne-da-loch; Glydelagh
St Saviour's Priory, near Derrybawn		Augustinian Canons Regular dependent on Holy Trinity, Dublin; purportedly founded before 1162? by St Laurence O'Toole; Augustinian Canons Regular — Arroasian reformed probably soon after 1163; dependent on All Saints', Dublin from before 1216; dissolved 1398	Glenlorcan; Regles; St Saviour Priory
Killaird Monastery ^{~}		early monastic site, nuns	Cell-aine
Killodry Priory ^{~}		Augustinian Canons Regular cell, dependent on St Thomas's, Dublin; foundation unknown; possibly located in County Wicklow dissolved 1539	
Rathnew Monastery		early monastic site, founded before 779, patronised by St Ernin	Raithnua
Shelton Abbey ^{^}		now a state forestry school	
Tigroney Monastery ^{ø~}		purported early monastic site, possibly founded by St Palladus possibly non-monastic	Tech-na-roman; Teachromam
Wicklow Friary		Franciscan Friars Minor, Conventual founded before 1268? (during the reign of Henry III); Observant Franciscan Friars reformed after 1521?; dissolved c.1551; leased to Henry Harrington 1575	Cell-mantain; Cell-mentain; Bachilow; Bichilo; Wykynlow
Wicklow Priory		Benedictine nuns founded c.1448; dissolved c.1470	Cell-mantain; Cell-mentain; Bachilow; Bichilo; Wykynlow

Return to top of page

==== Locations to be established ====
Foundation	Image	Communities & provenance	Formal name or dedication & alternative names	References
Acrimensis Friary ^{~}		Augustinian Friars	possibly Aughrim, County Galway	
Airdne Dairinnse Monastery ^{~}		early monastic site, founded by 6th century	Ardnense	
Ballineval Abbey (?) ^{~}		Premonstratensian Canons daughter of Prémonetré; founded before c.1290; dissolution unknown	Balinvalensis; Ballalan? also suggested to be Lough Oughter or Ballymore	
Ballistellensis Friary ^{~}		Augustinian Friars (Note: Louis Augustin Alemand, Monasticum Hibernicum, translated and edited by John Stevens, 1722, pp.301,312,331)	Ballistellensis in Connacht	
Belluir Friary ^{~≈?}		Carmelite Friars (Note: Fonds Grand Carmes)	possibly Ballinahinch	
Bellufamensis Friary ^{~≈?}		Augustinian Friars	Bellufamensis in Connacht; possibly Ballyhaunis	
Cluaine-tochne Monastery ^{~≈?}		early monastic site, founded before 765		
Deroten Friary ^{~}		Franciscan Friars (Note: Louis Augustin Alemand, Monasticon Hibernicum, translated and edited by John Stevens, 1722, p.235, gives a friary in the custody of Drogheda)		
Dissert-Chendubhain Monastery ^{~}		early monastic site, cell founded 6th century by St Abban		
Dissert-ternog Monastery ^{~}		early monastic site, founded before 819; situated west of River Barrow		
Dominensis Friary ^{~≈?}		Augustinian Friars; possible former house of Augustinian Canons	possibly Dunmore, County Galway or Devenish, County Fermanagh	
Domnach-ceirne Monastery ^{~}		early monastic site, nuns		
Glen-fuaid Monastery ^{~}		early monastic site, founded before 977, suggested to be located near Sliabh Fuaid, County Armagh, or Glenranny, County Waterford		
Imgoe-Mar-Cerrigi Monastery ^{~}		early monastic site, founded 5th century by St Patrick, possibly located at Emmoo, County Roscommon	Imgoe-Mar-Cerrigi in Connacht; Imgae-mair-cerrige	
Inisconla Monastery ^{~}		early monastic site, possibly Foynes Island, County Limerick, or Carrig Island, County Kerry; "Abbey" (Note: Ordnance Survey)	Inis-connla; Inis-cunla	
Letuba Monastery ^{~}		early monastic site, founded before 773; possibly located near the River Liffey	Leath-abha; Leth-abha	
Mag-Giallain Monastery ^{~}		early monastic site, mentioned 1310; possibly located in County Mayo or County Roscommon		
Molingar Friary ^{~}		Carmelite Friars, possible post-Reformation foundation at Mullingar, County Westmeath if not Milltown	Milltown?	
Mont Savachu Friary ^{~≈?}		Carmelite Friars; possibly located in Ulster (if Savacense)	Savacensis / Savacense?	
Savacense Friary ^{~≈?}		Carmelite Friars, probable post-Reormation foundation	Savacense in Ulster; Mont Savachu?	

== See also ==
- Dominicans in Ireland
- List of abbeys and priories
- List of castles in Northern Ireland
- List of castles in the Republic of Ireland
- List of cathedrals in Ireland
- List of cathedrals in the United Kingdom
- List of Catholic churches in Ireland
- List of monastic houses in England
- List of monastic houses in Scotland
- List of monastic houses in Wales
- List of monastic houses on the Isle of Man

== Sources ==
- Gwynn, Aubrey; R. Neville Hadcock (1970). Medieval Religious Houses Ireland. Longman. ISBN 0-582-11229-X.
- Kathleen Hughes & Ann Hamlin The Modern Traveller to the Early Irish Church, Four Courts Press (1997). ISBN 1-85182-194-5
- Lewis, Samuel (1837). A topographical dictionary of Ireland: comprising the several counties, cities, boroughs corporate, market, and post towns, parishes and villages ... : With an appendix describing the electoral boundaries of the several boroughs as defined by the act of the 2d. and 3d. of William IV. Lewis.
- Morrin, James (1862). Calendar of the Patent and Close Rolls of Chancery in Ireland, of the Reigns of Henry VIII., Edward VI., Mary, and Elizabeth ...: 1576-1602. Vol. II of Calendar of the Patent and Close Rolls of Chancery in Ireland, of the Reigns of Henry VIII. (Ireland. Chancery. ed.). A. Thom & sons.
