= List of monastic houses in County Down =

The smaller establishments such as monastic cells and notable monastic granges (particularly those with resident monks) and camerae of the military orders of monks (Knights Templars and Knights Hospitallers) are included. The numerous monastic hospitals per se are not included here unless at some time the foundation had, or was purported to have, the status or function of an abbey, priory, or preceptory/commandery.

== Layout ==
Communities/provenance: shows the status and communities existing at each establishment, together with such dates as have been established as well as the fate of the establishment after dissolution, and the current status of the site.

Formal name or dedication: shows the formal name of the establishment or the person in whose name the church is dedicated, where known.

Alternative names: some of the establishments have had alternative names over the course of time. In order to assist in text-searching such alternatives in name or spelling have been provided.

== Abbreviations and key ==
The sites listed are ruins or fragmentary remains unless indicated thus:
*	current monastic function
+	current non-monastic ecclesiastic function
^	current non-ecclesiastic function
=	remains incorporated into later structure
#	no identifiable trace of the monastic foundation remains
~	exact site of monastic foundation unknown
ø	possibly no such monastic foundation at location
¤	no such monastic foundation
≈	identification ambiguous or confused

Locations with names in italics indicate probable duplication (misidentification with another location) or non-existent foundations (either erroneous reference or proposed foundation never implemented).

Trusteeship denoted as follows:
NIEA	Scheduled Monument (NI)
NM	National Monument (ROI)
C.I.	Church of Ireland
R.C.	Roman Catholic Church

Locations of monastic houses in County Down

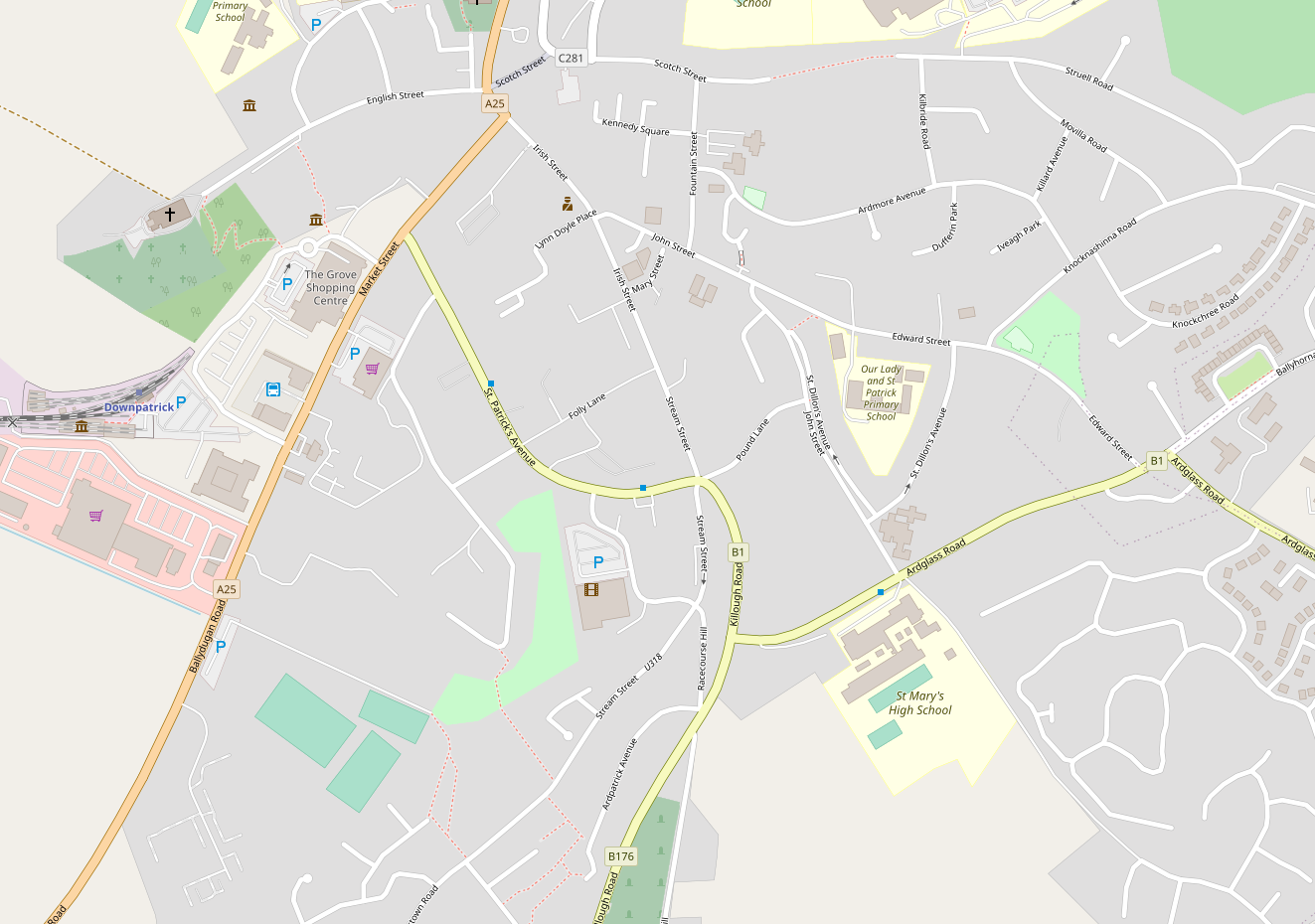
Locations of monastic houses in Downpatrick
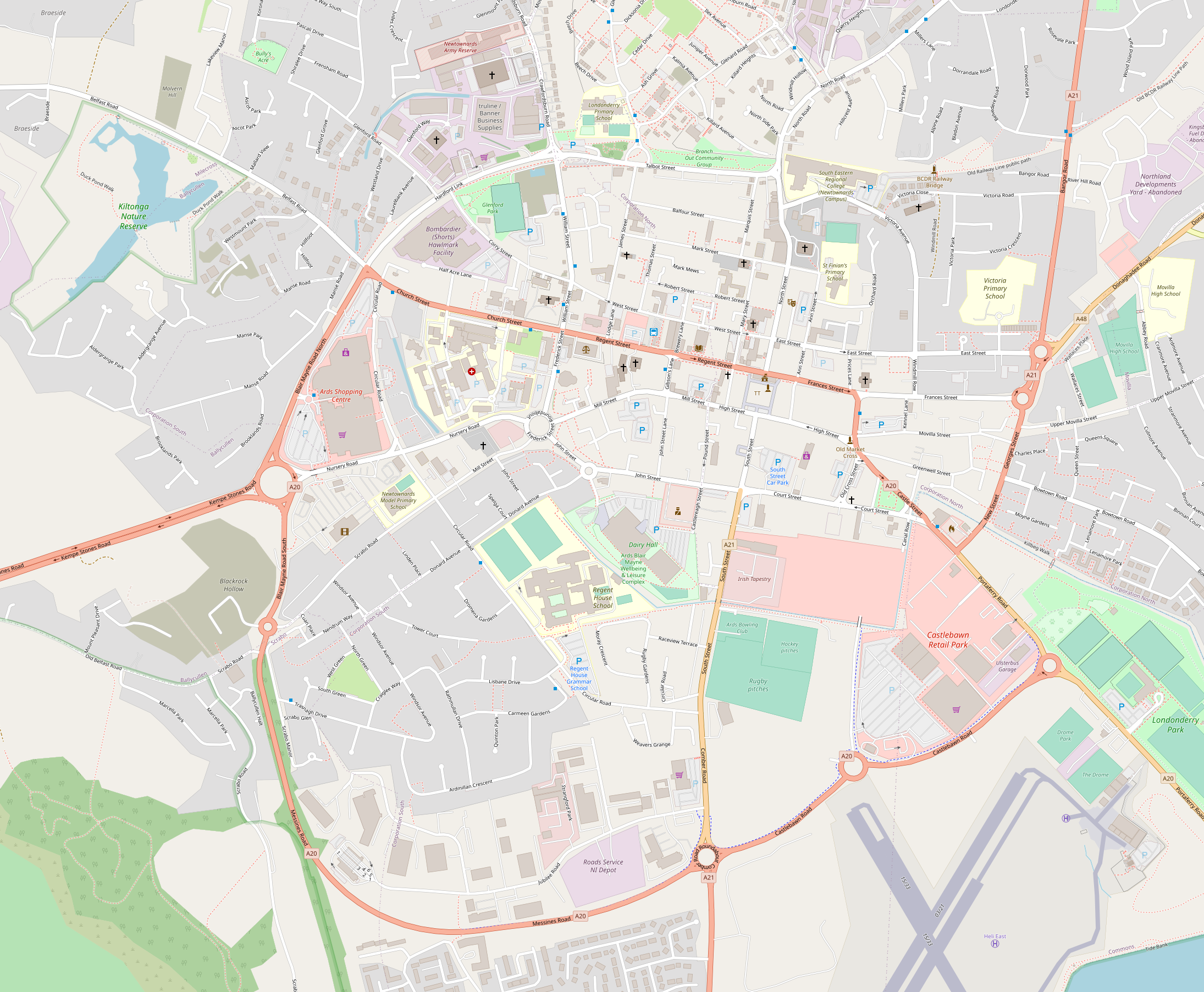
Locations of monastic houses in Newtownards

Foundation	Image	Communities & provenance	Formal name or dedication & alternative names	References & location
Achad-chail Monastery		early monastic site, founded by 5th century		
Ardicinise Monastery		Franciscan Friars, Third Order Regular founded by Hugh Burgo, local tradition of such a foundation, — evidence lacking; probably Hollywood, v. infra, (Ard-micnascai being the Irish name for Hollywood)		
Ard-mic-nascai Monastery		early monastic site, founded before 640 by St Laiseran; Holywood Priory (v. infra) built on site	Ard-mac-Croisk; Ard-mic-nascai; Ardnicise?	
Bangor Abbey		Gaelic monks founded 555 or 559 by St Comgall; Augustinian Canons Regular — from Armagh refounded after 1123-4 by St Malachy; destroyed 1127 during local conflicts c.1140, causing the departure of Malachy and many of his disciples, settling at Ibracense; dissolved 1539; assertion of refounding as a Franciscan house is a misinterpretation; site now incorporated into CI church	Beannchor; Bennchor; Vallis Angelorum; White Choir	
Bright Monastery		early monastic site, founded before 540 by St Loarn	Mrechtan; Breatain; Brich; Inreathan	(approx)
Burren		Dominican Friars — from Newtownards — place of refuge, apparently after the Restoration	An Bhoireann; Boirinn; Ballyburrin	(approx)
Castleboy Preceptory		Knights Hospitaller founded 1198 by Hugh de Lacy; dissolved c.1414; leased 1584 to George Alexander	St John-in-Ards; St John-in-Ardee; St Johnston; St Johnstowne; Castle-Buy	(approx)
Cill-mBian Monastery ^{~}		early monastic site, possibly located in County Down, founded before 584 by Fergus, Bishop of Down	Nemhan; Coelestius; Killmain	(approx)
Clonduff Monastery		early monastic site	Cluain daim	
Comber Abbey ^{#}		Cistercian monks — from Whitland founded 25 January 1200 by Brien Catha Dun on the site of earlier monastery (see immediately below); dissolved 1543; granted to James Hamilton, Viscount Clandeboy; assigned to Lord Ardes; site now occupied by St Mary's C.I. church	Comar; Domnach-combair; Comerer; Cumber; Cunbyr	
Comber monastery		early monastic site, founded by St Patrick	Comar; Domnach-combair; Comerer; Cumber; Cunbyr	
Donaghmore Monastery		early monastic site, founded mid-5th century by St Mac-Erc	Domnach-mor-maige-cobha	(approx)
Downpatrick Monastery ^{#}		early monastic site, traditionally founded 5th century by St Patrick on the dun or ráth on which the CI cathedral now stands	Dun-da-lethglas; Dun-Celtair; Dun	
Downpatrick Friary ^{#}		Franciscan Friars, Third Order Regular founded c.1240 (before 1243) by Hugh de Lacy, Earl of Ulster; burnt 1316; granted to Gerald, Earl of Kildare; Observant Franciscan Friars reformed 1567?; expelled by English protestants 1569; returned 1570; expelled again later; destroyed by the English, church retained as a courthouse; another house built for the convent in the vicinity 1627 (see immediately below)		
Downpatrick Observant Friary ^{#}		Observant Franciscan Friars founded 1627 in the vicinity of the earlier friary (see immediately above); dissolved 1650s		
Downpatrick, St John's Priory		Augustinian Canons Regular founded 1138 by Malachi O'Morgair; Augustinian Canons Regular — Arroasian adopted after 1140; incorporated in Down Cathedral 1513; dissolved before 1541; granted to Gerald, Earl of Kildare	probably St John the Evangelist, though given as St John the Baptist (confusion with Cruciferi priory) ____________________; Monastery of the Irish; Monaster-Grellach	
Downpatrick, St Thomas the Martyr's Priory		Augustinian Canons Regular founded before 1183 by John de Courcy, granted by him to the prior and canons of Carlisle; incorporated into Down Cathedral 1513; dissolved before 1541; granted to Gerald, Earl of Kildare 1541	St Thomas the Martyr ____________________; Toberglory	(approx)
Downpatrick Cruciferi Priory		Fratres Cruciferi founded before 1200 by John de Courcy; incorporated into Down Cathedral 1513; dissolved before 1541; granted to Gerald, Earl of Kildare	St John the Baptist ____________________; The Priory of the English	(approx)
Downpatrick Priory		Cistercian or Benedictine nuns convent founded before 1200? purportedly by the Bagnal family; ruinous by 1513; incorporated into Down Cathedral 1513	The Nunnery of the Blessed Mary	(approx)
Dromore Friary		Franciscan Friars founded 1637; dissolved c.1717		
Dromore Monastery ^{+}		early monastic site, founded 6th century? (c.513) by St Mocholmog (Colman); episcopal diocesan cathedral 1192?, extant	Druim-mor-mocholmog	
Drumbo Abbey		early monastic site, founded 5th century by St Patrick?; plundered by Connor, son of Artgal M'Lochlin 1130	Druim-bo	
Dundrum Preceptory		Knights Templar castle purportedly built 1183 by John de Courcy; in their possession until 1313; granted to the prior of Down		
Dunsy Island Monastery; Killinchy in the lough		early monastic site, founded by St Duinseach	Oileán Dúinsighe; Ilandushagh	
Erenagh Abbey		Savignac monks — from Furness founded 1127 by Niall Mac Dunlevi, King of Ulster; Cistercian monks orders merged 1147-8; destroyed by John de Courcy 1177; transferred to Inch 1177	Erynagh; Ernes; Urney; Carig; Carrig; Carricke; Templenageerah	(approx)
Grey Abbey		Cistercian monks — from Holmcultram founded 25 August 1193 by Africa, wife of John de Courcy; dissolved 1 February 1541; granted to English colonists by Elizabeth I; burnt by Sir Brian O'Neill 1572 to prevent the colonists seeking shelter there; rebuilt and served for a time as a parish church	Jugum Dei; Monaster-Liath; Leigh	
Holywood Priory		Franciscan Friars, Third Order Regular built on site of Ard-mic-nascai Monastery (v. supra); Holywood (Ard Mhic Nasca in Irish) was named Sanctus Boscus ("Holy Wood") by the Normans after the woodland surrounding the monastery	Ard-mac-Croisk; Ard-mic-nascai; Ardnicise?; de Sacro Bosco ("Holy Wood")	
Inch Abbey		Cistercian monks — from Furness founded 1180 (or 1188) by John de Courcy, on the site of an earlier monastery (see immediately below), replacing the monastery at Carig (Erenagh) which he destroyed; dissolved 1541	Iniscourcey; Inis-courcey; Insula Curcii	
Inch Monastery		early monastic site, foundation and founder unknown; plundered by Sitric and Norsemen 1001; plundered 1149	Inis-cumbscraigh; Inis; Egnis;	
Kilbroney Monastery		early monastic site, founded by St Brónach	Brónchi uirginis Bronach uirgo o Glinn Sechis; Cill Bronaighe - Bronach's Church; Chill Sechis; Bronach ógh ó	
Kilclief Monastery		early monastic site, purportedly founded by St Patrick; plundered and burned 935; annexed to Down see 1034	Cell-clethi; Cell-cleithe; Kyleleth	
Killinchy Monastery; Killinchy in the plain		early monastic site, founded by St Duinseach	Cell-insi; Killiny; Kilwyinchi; Cill Dhuinsí; Ecclesia de Kilwyinchi	
Killinchy Monastery; Killinchy in the woods		early monastic site, founded by St Duinseach	Cill Dunsí na Coille; Killinchy Nekelly	
Kilmbian Monastery ^{~}		early monastic site, possibly located in County Down, founded before 584 by Fergus, Bishop of Down	Cell-biain; Cill-m-Bian; Cill-biein; Kil-m-bian	
Kiltonga Monastery		cell, unknown order, foundation or founder; referred to as the chapel of Kilarneid	Killarneid	(approx)
Maghera Monastery		early monastic site, founded before 567 by St Domangard, Bishop, disciple of St Patrick	Machaire-ratha	
Magheralin Monastery		early monastic site; occupied by remains of 15th-century church	Lann-mocholmoc;	
Moneyscalp Friary		Dominican Friars — from their place of refuge at Burren, (supra)	Ballymonyskalpie; Muine Scealp	(approx)
Movilla Abbey		early monastic site, founded before 579 by St Finnian of Moville; burnt by Norsemen 825; revived by St Malachy after 1124; Augustinian Canons Regular refounded after 1135?; Augustinian Canons Regular — Arroasian? adopted after 1140; dissolved 1542; site occupied by 13th-15th-century church	Moville; Magbile; Maghbille; Mable; Mainbile; Moybily	
Nendrum Monastery, Mahee Island (Strangford Lough)		Patrician monks founded 5th century by St Patrick; burned 10th century	Oendruim; Aonagh-urmuman; Oinach-urmuman; Nenddrum; Noindrum; Noendoma; Mahee Island	
Nendrum Priory		Benedictine monks cell, dependent on St Bees founded 1179 by John de Courcy, who granted land to St Bees (dependent on St Mary's, York), on site of earlier monastery (see immediately above); confirmed to York 1222; disposed of by Henry de Horton 1288; dissolved before 1298; monks probably resided at Templepatrick 13th century; by 1306 a parish church, abandoned 15th century	Oendruim; Aonagh-urmuman; Oinach-urmuman; Nenddrum; Noindrum; Noendoma; Mahee Island	
Newry Abbey		possible foundation of Patrician monks possible Benendictine monks founded before 1148? Cistercian monks — from Mellifont founded 1153 by Maurice MacLaughlin, King of Ireland; confirmation of possessions granted 1538 to become a secular collegiate church; surrendered 10 August 1550; granted to Sir Nicholas Bagnall, Marshall of the Army April 1552; chapel on site until c.1744 and abbot's house apparentlyconverted into a private residence; site was cleared end of 18th century for the construction of the modern town; a stone carved with a cross in low relief incorporated into the walls of McCann's bakery, currently on monastic site	St Benedict ____________________; Ibhar-cinntrachta; Iubhair-cinntrachta; Mainister-iubhair; Monaster-de-viride-ligno; Viride Lignum; Nivory; Nyvery	
Newry — St Catherine's Priory *		Dominican Friars extant		
Newry Carmelite Monastery		Carmelite nuns		
Newtownards Priory		Dominican Friars founded 1244, purportedly by the Savage family (Note: Louis Augustin Alemand, Monasticum Hibernicum, translated and edited by John Stevens, 1722) or William de Burgo (Note: Tomas de Burgo, Hibernica Dominicana, 1762 edition) — evidence lacking for either; (Note: A. Coleman, O.P., The Ancient Dominican Foundations of Ireland, 1902) dissolved February 1541, surrendered by the prior, Patrick O'Doran; granted to Sir Thomas Smith by Elizabeth I; burned by O'Neill of Clandeboye 1572 to prevent use as a fort by the English; reroofed by Lord Montgomery for use by Protestants	St Colmcille ____________________; Baile-nua-na-airde; Baile-nudh-airde; Villanova; Newton	
Portaferry Monastery ^{#} Derry Churches		site thought to be now occupied by two small churches; patron St. Cummain, Virgin, of Dál mBuinne, and of Derry, Parish of Ballyphillip		
Raholp Monastery	St Tassach's church, Raholp (2) - geograph.org.uk - 542235	early monastic site, founded purportedly by St Patrick	Raith-colpthai; Cell-colptha; Kilcholpa	(approx)
Rathmullan Camera?		Knights Hospitaller possible camera or frankhouse, hospital or hospice, limb of Castleboys	Rath-mullin; Rath-molyn; Ecclesia de Rathmolyn	
Saul Monastery	Graveyard at St Patrick's Memorial church, Saul - geograph.org.uk - 269928	According to tradition in 432 the local chieftain Dichu gave St Patrick land. On this land was built a barn: thus Saul became the site of St Patrick's first church.	Sabhull Padraig; Sepulturam Patricii; Baile itá Saball; an Sabhall	
St Andrews in Ards Priory		Benedictine monks alien house: dependent on Stogursey, Somerset and Lonlay Abbey, France; founded after 1183 by John de Courcy; became denizen:independent from 1356; dissolved c.1543?; granted by James I, to the Protestant Bishop of Armagh	Black Abbey; Blackabbey; Mainister Dubh	(approx)
St Donard Oratory		early monastic cell/oratory, founded c.506, by Domangart, son of Echaid	Sliab-domhanghairt; Sliab-domhanghairt-slange; Salanga	(approx)
Stokes Priory	duplication of St Andrews in Ards, (Note: Stokes Priory — listed by Louis Augustin Alemand, Monasticum Hibernicum, translated and edited by John Stevens, 1722) supra			
Tamlacht-meenan Monastery		early monastic site, founded before 627	Tamlachta Umhail	(approx)
Tullyhoa Abbey ^{ø}		order, foundation and founder unknown; ruins purported to be the remains of an abbey		
Tullylish Monastery ^{#}	Tullylish old church - geograph.org.uk - 344807	early monastic site, founded by St Bearnasga of Tulach-lis; mistakenly identified as Tyllylease (County Cork); remains excavated in the vicinity of the ruined parochial church (abandoned 1861, replaced by new church built to the west)	Telach-liss	

== Map link to lists of monastic houses in Ireland by county ==
Click on a county to go to the corresponding article.	Antrim; Armagh; Down; Fermanagh; Londonderry; Tyrone; Carlow; Cavan; Clare; Cork; Donegal; Dublin; Galway; Kerry; Kildare; Kilkenny; Laois; Leitrim; Limerick; Longford; Louth; Mayo; Meath; Monaghan; Offaly; Roscommon; Sligo; Tipperary; Waterford; Westmeath; Wexford; Wicklow

== See also ==
- List of monastic houses in Ireland

54°38′35″N 5°49′52″W 54°39′20″N 5°40′29″W 54°16′33″N 5°40′06″W 54°14′36″N 5°57′46″W 54°16′31″N 5°40′05″W 54°23′21″N 5°47′17″W 54°11′55″N 6°07′07″W 54°33′01″N 5°44′36″W 54°14′38″N 6°13′59″W 54°19′40″N 5°43′16″W 54°19′19″N 5°42′44″W 54°19′33″N 5°42′38″W 54°19′36″N 5°42′58″W 54°24′53″N 6°09′06″W 54°31′00″N 5°57′37″W 54°15′43″N 5°50′42″W 54°27′24″N 5°37′11″W 54°17′25″N 5°44′20″W 54°32′13″N 5°33′18″W 54°38′35″N 5°49′53″W 54°20′12″N 5°43′45″W 54°06′41″N 6°11′03″W 54°20′05″N 5°32′49″W 54°28′25″N 5°40′33″W 54°24′56″N 5°44′47″W 54°35′57″N 5°43′10″W 54°14′17″N 5°53′51″W 54°27′59″N 6°15′38″W 54°13′41″N 5°58′26″W 54°35′35″N 5°41′20″W 54°29′53″N 5°38′53″W 54°10′25″N 6°20′17″W 54°12′21″N 6°16′24″W 54°35′28″N 5°41′32″W 54°23′40″N 5°31′06″W 54°21′16″N 5°38′09″W 54°15′59″N 5°44′05″W 54°20′37″N 5°40′47″W 54°31′27″N 5°31′25″W 54°10′49″N 5°55′15″W 54°18′16″N 6°18′19″W 54°22′29″N 6°20′06″W
