= Deery =

Deery is a surname. Notable people with the surname include:

- John Deery, English film director
- Maurie Deery (born 1947), Australian rules footballer
- Tom Deery (born 1960), American football player

== See also ==
- Dery
- Bob Diry (1884–?), German boxer
