= Londonderry (disambiguation) =

Londonderry, also known as Derry, is a city in Northern Ireland.

Londonderry may also refer to:

== Australia ==
- Cape Londonderry, the northernmost point of mainland Western Australia
- Electoral district of Londonderry in New South Wales
- Londonderry, New South Wales, a suburb of Sydney
- Londonderry, Western Australia, an abandoned town in Western Australia

== Canada ==
- Londonderry, Nova Scotia, an unincorporated community
- Londonderry, Edmonton, a residential area in northeast Edmonton, Alberta

== Chile ==
- Londonderry Island, an island and archipelago off Tierra del Fuego

== England ==
- Londonderry, North Yorkshire, a village near the Yorkshire Dales
- Londonderry, West Midlands, an area in Sandwell, West Midlands

== Northern Ireland ==
- County Londonderry, or County Derry
- Londonderry County Borough Council now called Derry City Council
- Londonderry Port, the city's port
- Londonderry Eglinton Airport now called City of Derry Airport
- County Londonderry (Parliament of Ireland constituency)
- Londonderry City (Parliament of Ireland constituency)
- County Londonderry (UK Parliament constituency) (historically focused on the county)
- Londonderry City (UK Parliament constituency) (historically focused on the city)
- East Londonderry (UK Parliament constituency), present-day parliamentary constituency
- Londonderry (Northern Ireland Parliament constituency)
- City of Londonderry (Northern Ireland Parliament constituency)
- Londonderry (Assembly constituency)

== United States ==
- Londonderry, New Hampshire, a New England town
  - Londonderry (CDP), New Hampshire, the densely settled portions of the town
- Londonderry, Guernsey County, Ohio, an unincorporated community
- Londonderry, Ross County, Ohio, an unincorporated community
- Londonderry, Vermont, a New England town
  - Londonderry (CDP), Vermont, a village in the town

== Other uses ==
- The Marquess of Londonderry
- The Earl of Londonderry or Baron Londonderry
- HMS Londonderry, two Royal Navy ships
- Londonderry House, Mayfair, London
- Londonderry Air, a musical air from County Londonderry
- Annie Londonderry (1870–1947), the first woman to bicycle around the world

== See also ==
- Londonderry Township (disambiguation)
- Derry (disambiguation)
- North Londonderry (disambiguation)
- East Londonderry (disambiguation)
- South Londonderry (disambiguation)
- List of Irish place names in other countries
