= Derry (disambiguation) =

Derry, also known as Londonderry, is a city in Northern Ireland.

Derry may also refer to:

== Places ==
=== Connected to the city ===
- County Londonderry, also called County Derry
- Roman Catholic Diocese of Derry
- Apprentice Boys of Derry
  - Apprentice Boys of Derry Memorial Hall
  - Derry Day
  - Siege of Derry

=== Elsewhere in Ireland ===
- Derry, County Armagh, a townland in County Armagh
- Three townlands in County Cavan:
  - Derry, Crosserlough
  - Derry, Killashandra
  - Derry, Shercock
- Three townlands in County Clare:
  - Derry, Inagh
  - Derry, Kilseily
  - Derry, Templemaley
- Four townlands in County Cork:
  - Derry, Clonmeen
  - Derry, Desertserges
  - Derry, Donaghmore
  - Derry, Ross
- Two townlands in County Down:
  - Derry, Ballyphilip
  - Derry, Dromara
- Derry, County Fermanagh, a townland in County Fermanagh
- Three townlands in County Galway:
  - Derry, Ballynacourty
  - Derry, Beagh
  - Derry, Meelick
- Derry, County Kerry, a townland in County Kerry
- Derry, County Limerick, a townland in County Limerick
- Three townlands in County Laois:
  - Derry, Kilmanman
  - Derry, Rearymore
  - Derry, Straboe
- Five townlands in County Mayo:
  - Derry, Ballinchalla
  - Derry, Cong
  - Derry, Crossboyne
  - Derry, Kilgeever
  - Derry, Knock
- Three townlands in County Monaghan:
  - Derry, Aghnamullen
  - Derry, Magheracloone
  - Derry, Tehallan
- Derry, County Roscommon, a townland in County Roscommon
- Derry, County Sligo, a townland in County Sligo
- Two townlands in County Tipperary:
  - Derry, Dorrha
  - Derry, Loughmoe East
- Two townlands in County Tyrone:
  - Derry, Kilskeery
  - Derry, Tullyniskan
- Derry, County Westmeath, a townland in County Westmeath
- Derry, County Wexford, a townland in County Wexford
- River Derry, County Wicklow

=== In Britain ===
- Derry Downs, a district of Orpington, Kent

=== In the United States ===
- Derry, Louisiana, an unincorporated community
- Derry, Maine, a fictional town, setting of some of Stephen King's fiction
- Derry, New Hampshire, a New England town
  - Derry (CDP), New Hampshire, the densely settled central part of the town
- Derry, New Mexico, an unincorporated community
- Derry, Oregon
- Derry, Pennsylvania, a borough
- Derry Mining Site Camp, near Leadville, Colorado, that lasted from 1916 to 1923
- Derry Township (disambiguation), numerous places

== People ==
- Derry (given name), a list of people
- Derry (surname), a list of people

== Other uses ==
- Derry City F.C., association football club in the Northern Ireland city
- Derry GAA, Gaelic football and hurling teams representing the county
- Derry Girls, sitcom based in the Northern Ireland city (broadcast 2018–2022)
- USS Derry (ID-1391), barge of the United States Navy (1917–1919)
- Derry (Stephen King), a fictional town in Maine

== See also ==
- Londonderry (disambiguation)
- Derry City (disambiguation)
- Dery
- Dairy
