= South Londonderry =

South Londonderry can refer to:

In Northern Ireland

- South Londonderry (UK Parliament constituency), a former UK Parliament constituency
- South Londonderry (Northern Ireland Parliament constituency), a former Northern Ireland Parliament constituency
- The southern part of County Londonderry

In the United States

- South Londonderry Township, Pennsylvania
- South Londonderry, Vermont
  - South Londonderry Village Historic District

== See also ==
- Londonderry (disambiguation)
- Derry (disambiguation)
