= White House, County Down =

Coordinates: 54.41658°N 5.46664°W

The building in 2024

The White House is a ruined 17th century dwelling house at Ballyspurge, near Cloghy, County Down, Northern Ireland on the Ards Peninsula. It is situated about one mile (1.2 km) south-east of Cloghy, overlooking Slanes Bay. It is a State Care Historic Monument at grid ref: J6248 5506.

== History ==
The interior at sunset

Roland Savage died in 1640 and bequeathed Ballygalget to his eldest son, Roland, Kirkistown to his second son, John, and Ballyspurge to his third son, Patrick. Soon afterwards Patrick built the White House. Other sources indicate that the house appears to have been built about 1634 by Roland Savage, a "cadet of the Ardkeen family".
