= Whatawhata =

Town in Waikato, New Zealand

- Township
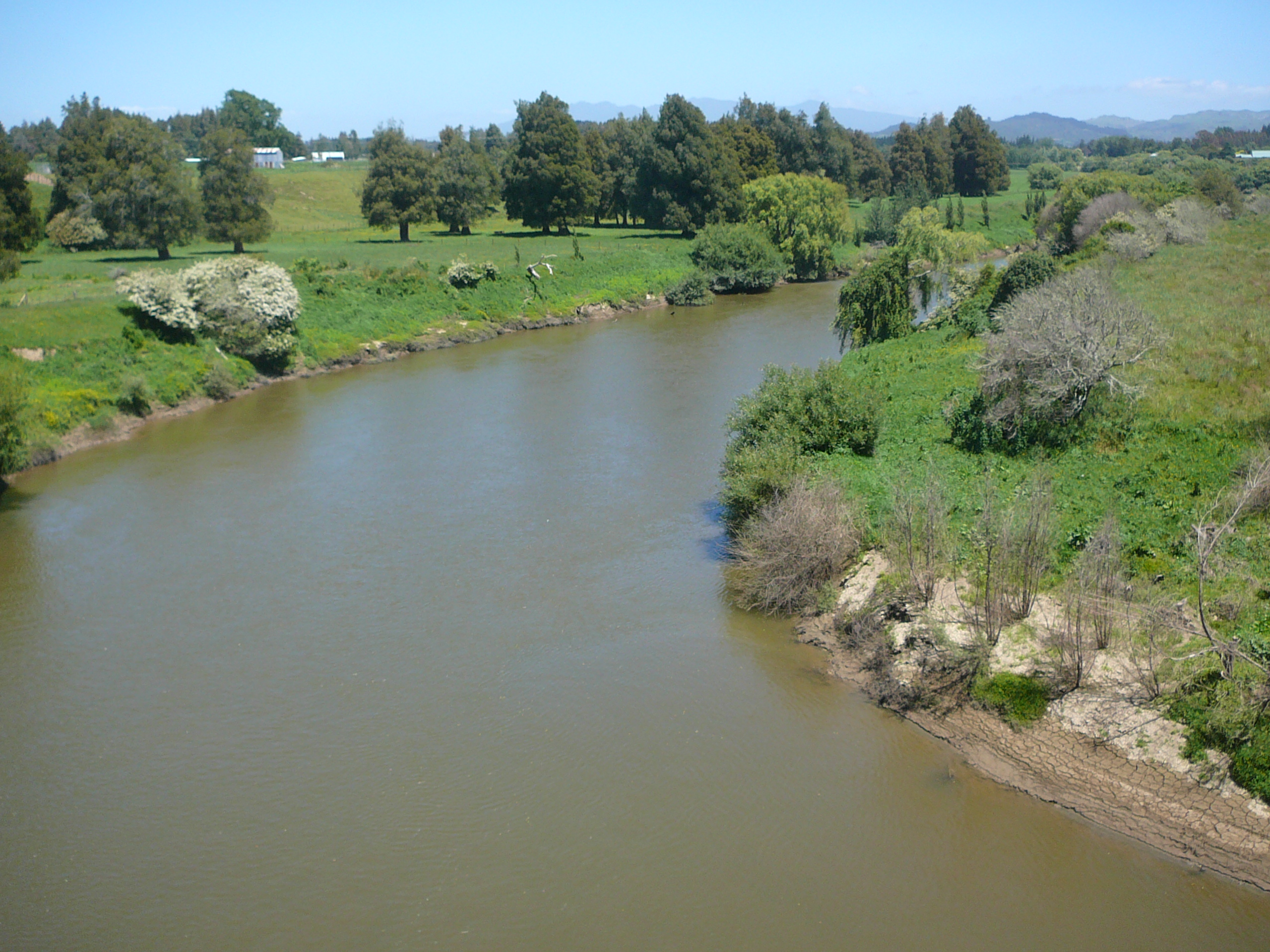
- from SH23 bridge
- Interactive map of Whatawhata
- Coordinates: 37°48′S 175°09′E
- Country: New Zealand
- Region: Waikato
- District: Waikato District
- Wards: Newcastle-Ngāruawāhia General Ward; Tai Runga Takiwaa Maaori Ward
- Electorates: Taranaki-King Country; Hauraki-Waikato (Māori)

Government
  - Territorial Authority: Waikato District Council
  - Regional council: Waikato Regional Council
  - Mayor of Waikato: Aksel Bech
  - Taranaki-King Country MP: Barbara Kuriger
  - Hauraki-Waikato MP: Hana-Rawhiti Maipi-Clarke

Area
  - Territorial: 0.93 km^{2} (0.36 sq mi)
- Elevation: 20 m (66 ft)

Population (June 2025)
  - Territorial: 300
  - Density: 320/km^{2} (840/sq mi)
- Time zone: UTC+12 (NZST)
  - Summer (DST): UTC+13 (NZDT)

Whatawhata, previously also spelt Whata Whata, is a small town in the Waikato region on the east bank of the Waipā River, at the junction of State Highways 23 and 39, 12 km (7.5 mi) from Hamilton. Te Araroa tramping route passes through Whatawhata.

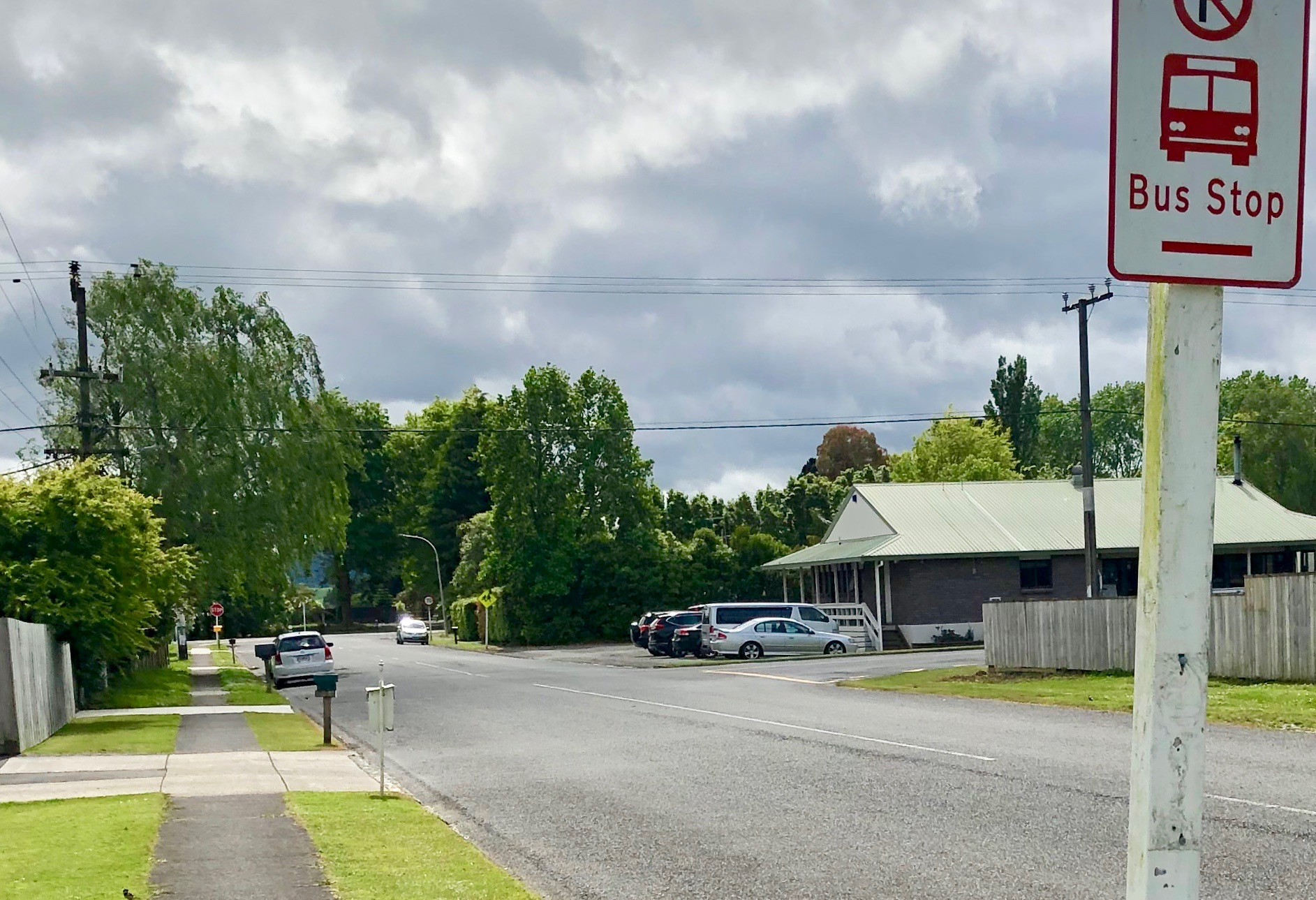
Whatawhata - Te Kowhai Golf Club and bus stop on Store Rd

== History and culture ==
=== Pre-European history ===
Whatawhata was a Ngāti Māhanga village and there are still Te Papa-o-Rotu and Ōmaero maraes on the west bank of the river. In early colonial times Whatawhata was one of many sites in Waikato with a flour mill. It was built in 1855 and producing flour by the end of that year. The area must have been suited to wheat, for there was another mill about 4 km (2.5 mi) downstream, at Karakariki, by 1860.

=== European settlement ===
British troops arrived at Whatawhata over land and by river, as part of the Invasion of the Waikato, on 28 December 1863. Whatawhata was described as having no end of peach trees, which the soldiers stripped of their fruit. Within a year a telegraph line had been built.

A 1915 guide described Whatawhata as, "six miles from Frankton Junction, along a good metalled road. Coaches run to and from Frankton Junction daily, the fares being 2/- single and 3/6 return. The principal industries are farming and dairying. There is one hotel in the township, also school, and post and telegraph office. Small steamers ply up and down the river from Huntly, the waters being navigable as far up as Pirongia. Whatawhata was in the early days an important Maori centre, having at one time a native population of over a thousand."

Since then the post office has been replaced by a petrol station and dairy, the coach has become 4 per day and the river is rarely disturbed by any craft. Also the AgResearch hill-country research station at Whatawhata was started in 1949.

Across the road from AgResearch, Campbell Coal Ltd developed a coal mine in 1920, was advertising for about 10 tons a day to be carried to Hamilton in 1921 and had it fully open by 1923. It produced 9,272 tons in 1945 from a 10 ft (3.0 m) seam, employing 6 miners and 5 surface workers. Hallyburton Johnstone said there was never a strike at the mine. The coal was sub-bituminous with a fairly high calorific value, but was largely worked out by the 1970s, when Hamilton gasworks closed. 2.9m tons is estimated to be still recoverable.

An 1880 guide said, "It is about ten miles distant from Hamilton, but a sum of money has been voted for making a direct road through a large swamp, which will bring the Hamilton station within six miles of the township. The road to Raglan crosses the, Waipā River here, and a bridge will shortly be built, when the ferry, which is now worked by natives, will be done away with. Heavy goods, such as timber, wire and manure, are brought up by the Waikato Steam Navigation Company's steamers. . . There is a convenient school in the township, where there is an average attendance of nearly forty children. The school-house and teacher's residence, erected a short time ago (1877) by the Board of Education, the settlers contributing largely towards them, are excellent buildings . . . two stores, a bakery, and comfortable hotel. Of this last Mr. G. T. M. Kellow is proprietor. He has good accommodation and stabling, and keeps excellent liquors . . . Mr. W. H. Bailey has a general store and bakery. . . convenient to the Raglan and Whatawhata bridge site. . . Mr. Day has a farm| of 1,000 acres . . . five acres in oats and the same in mangold . . . wheat thirty acres . . . a large dairy . . . pigs . . . trees are kahikatea and rimu, with a little mataī . . . Whatawhata racecourse . . . runs right round the township"

A post office opened in 1868, burnt down in 1913 and was rebuilt in 1915. Electricity came to Whatawhata in 1922.

=== Marae ===
Whatawhata has two marae, affiliated with the Waikato Tainui hapū of Ngāti Māhanga and Ngāti Hourua: Ōmaero Marae and its Te Awaitaia meeting house, and Te Papa o Rotu Marae / Te Oneparepare Marae and its Papa o Rotu meeting house.

== Demographics ==
Statistics New Zealand describes Whatawhata as a rural settlement, which covers 0.93 km^{2} (0.36 sq mi) and had an estimated population of 300 as of June 2025, with a population density of 323 people per km^{2}. Whatawhata settlement is part of the larger Whatawhata East statistical area.

Historical population of Whatawhata settlement
Year	Pop.	±% p.a.
2006	273	—
2013	273	+0.00%
2018	303	+2.11%
2023	294	−0.60%

Whatawhata settlement had a population of 294 in the 2023 New Zealand census, a decrease of 9 people (−3.0%) since the 2018 census, and an increase of 21 people (7.7%) since the 2013 census. There were 147 males, 144 females and 3 people of other genders in 96 dwellings. 3.1% of people identified as LGBTIQ+. The median age was 35.5 years (compared with 38.1 years nationally). There were 69 people (23.5%) aged under 15 years, 54 (18.4%) aged 15 to 29, 138 (46.9%) aged 30 to 64, and 33 (11.2%) aged 65 or older.

People could identify as more than one ethnicity. The results were 75.5% European (Pākehā), 36.7% Māori, 3.1% Pasifika, and 4.1% Asian. English was spoken by 95.9%, Māori language by 6.1%, and other languages by 4.1%. No language could be spoken by 2.0% (e.g. too young to talk). The percentage of people born overseas was 9.2, compared with 28.8% nationally.

Religious affiliations were 21.4% Christian, and 1.0% Hindu. People who answered that they had no religion were 70.4%, and 6.1% of people did not answer the census question.

Of those at least 15 years old, 24 (10.7%) people had a bachelor's or higher degree, 123 (54.7%) had a post-high school certificate or diploma, and 75 (33.3%) people exclusively held high school qualifications. The median income was $38,600, compared with $41,500 nationally. 21 people (9.3%) earned over $100,000 compared to 12.1% nationally. The employment status of those at least 15 was that 111 (49.3%) people were employed full-time, 51 (22.7%) were part-time, and 9 (4.0%) were unemployed.

=== Whatawhata statistical areas ===
Two statistical areas make up the larger Whatawhata area, covering 98.14 km^{2} (37.89 sq mi) with an estimated population of 3,660 as of June 2025, with a population density of 37 people per km^{2}.

Historical population of the Whatawhata area
Year	Pop.	±% p.a.
2006	2,235	—
2013	2,628	+2.34%
2018	3,273	+4.49%
2023	3,537	+1.56%

Whatawhata statistical areas had a population of 3,537 in the 2023 New Zealand census, an increase of 264 people (8.1%) since the 2018 census, and an increase of 909 people (34.6%) since the 2013 census. There were 1,818 males, 1,716 females and 6 people of other genders in 1,131 dwellings. 2.4% of people identified as LGBTIQ+. There were 786 people (22.2%) aged under 15 years, 576 (16.3%) aged 15 to 29, 1,665 (47.1%) aged 30 to 64, and 510 (14.4%) aged 65 or older.

People could identify as more than one ethnicity. The results were 83.9% European (Pākehā); 20.9% Māori; 3.4% Pasifika; 3.0% Asian; 1.0% Middle Eastern, Latin American and African New Zealanders (MELAA); and 3.1% other, which includes people giving their ethnicity as "New Zealander". English was spoken by 97.7%, Māori language by 6.2%, Samoan by 0.2%, and other languages by 6.4%. No language could be spoken by 1.7% (e.g. too young to talk). New Zealand Sign Language was known by 0.3%. The percentage of people born overseas was 13.1, compared with 28.8% nationally.

Religious affiliations were 30.4% Christian, 0.6% Hindu, 0.1% Islam, 1.1% Māori religious beliefs, 0.3% Buddhist, 0.3% New Age, 0.1% Jewish, and 1.0% other religions. People who answered that they had no religion were 57.8%, and 8.7% of people did not answer the census question.

Of those at least 15 years old, 603 (21.9%) people had a bachelor's or higher degree, 1,602 (58.2%) had a post-high school certificate or diploma, and 537 (19.5%) people exclusively held high school qualifications. 468 people (17.0%) earned over $100,000 compared to 12.1% nationally. The employment status of those at least 15 was that 1,581 (57.5%) people were employed full-time, 450 (16.4%) were part-time, and 51 (1.9%) were unemployed.

Individual statistical areas
Name	Area (km^{2})	Population	Density (per km^{2})	Dwellings	Median age	Median income
Whatawhata West	50.70	540	11	180	40.4 years	$47,200
Whatawhata East	47.44	2,997	63	951	41.4 years	$51,000
New Zealand					38.1 years	$41,500

== Education ==
Whatawhata School is a co-educational state primary school for Year 1 to 8 students with a roll of 278 as of July 2026. The school opened in 1887.

== Climate ==
Climate data for Whatawhata (1991–2020 normals, extremes 1952–present)
Month	Jan	Feb	Mar	Apr	May	Jun	Jul	Aug	Sep	Oct	Nov	Dec	Year
Record high °C (°F)	32.2 (90.0)	33.0 (91.4)	31.3 (88.3)	26.7 (80.1)	23.3 (73.9)	20.6 (69.1)	20.4 (68.7)	21.7 (71.1)	22.9 (73.2)	24.3 (75.7)	27.1 (80.8)	30.2 (86.4)	33.0 (91.4)
Mean maximum °C (°F)	28.7 (83.7)	28.4 (83.1)	27.4 (81.3)	24.3 (75.7)	21.0 (69.8)	17.7 (63.9)	16.8 (62.2)	17.6 (63.7)	19.9 (67.8)	21.5 (70.7)	24.4 (75.9)	26.3 (79.3)	29.5 (85.1)
Mean daily maximum °C (°F)	23.6 (74.5)	24.5 (76.1)	23.1 (73.6)	20.0 (68.0)	16.8 (62.2)	14.3 (57.7)	13.5 (56.3)	14.3 (57.7)	15.8 (60.4)	17.2 (63.0)	19.1 (66.4)	21.4 (70.5)	18.6 (65.5)
Daily mean °C (°F)	18.4 (65.1)	19.1 (66.4)	17.6 (63.7)	15.1 (59.2)	12.6 (54.7)	10.4 (50.7)	9.5 (49.1)	10.4 (50.7)	11.7 (53.1)	13.1 (55.6)	14.6 (58.3)	16.9 (62.4)	14.1 (57.4)
Mean daily minimum °C (°F)	13.3 (55.9)	13.7 (56.7)	12.2 (54.0)	10.3 (50.5)	8.4 (47.1)	6.5 (43.7)	5.4 (41.7)	6.4 (43.5)	7.6 (45.7)	9.1 (48.4)	10.1 (50.2)	12.3 (54.1)	9.6 (49.3)
Mean minimum °C (°F)	8.5 (47.3)	8.4 (47.1)	7.0 (44.6)	4.1 (39.4)	1.9 (35.4)	0.5 (32.9)	−0.5 (31.1)	0.6 (33.1)	2.0 (35.6)	3.1 (37.6)	4.1 (39.4)	6.7 (44.1)	−0.7 (30.7)
Record low °C (°F)	2.7 (36.9)	3.0 (37.4)	0.4 (32.7)	−2.4 (27.7)	−3.7 (25.3)	−3.9 (25.0)	−3.6 (25.5)	−3.3 (26.1)	−2.1 (28.2)	−0.3 (31.5)	0.5 (32.9)	2.6 (36.7)	−3.9 (25.0)
Average rainfall mm (inches)	89.4 (3.52)	75.2 (2.96)	104.9 (4.13)	116.0 (4.57)	159.0 (6.26)	188.2 (7.41)	192.1 (7.56)	164.0 (6.46)	160.7 (6.33)	138.5 (5.45)	130.6 (5.14)	124.1 (4.89)	1,642.7 (64.68)
Mean monthly sunshine hours	238.4	177.2	149.6	147.3	128.5	83.1	121.0	123.6	135.2	162.4	174.6	193.7	1,834.6
Source: NIWA(sunshine 1981–2010)
