= Derry (surname) =

Derry is a surname. Among those with the name are:

- Duncan R. Derry (1906–1987) Canadian economic geologist
- Henry Bromley Derry (1885–1954), English organist and composer
- Jesse Derry (born 2007), English footballer
- John Derry (1921–1952), British test pilot
- John Derry (bishop) (1811–1870), Irish prelate
- John W. Derry (born 1933), British historian
- Karin Derry, American politician
- Laura Miller Derry (1905–1993), American attorney
- Nathan Derry (born 1987), English darts player
- Percy Derry (1859–1928), British Anglican priest
- Reigan Derry (born 1988), Australian singer and songwriter
- Russ Derry (1916–2004), American baseball player
- Shaun Derry (born 1977), English footballer
- Tiffany Derry (born 1982), American chef

== See also ==
- Derry (given name)
- Derry (disambiguation)
