= List of shipwrecks in February 1875 =

The list of shipwrecks in February 1875 includes ships sunk, foundered, grounded, or otherwise lost during February 1875.

== 1 February ==
List of shipwrecks: 1 February 1875
Ship	State	Description
Gundrun	United Kingdom	The ship was driven ashore in Ballycroone Bay. She was refloated and taken in to Queenstown, County Cork in a leaky condition.
Moravian	United States	The ship was abandoned in the Atlantic Ocean. Her 26 crew were rescued by the schooner Fertius (Sweden). Moravian was on a voyage from Cardiff, Glamorgan, United Kingdom to Mollendo, Peru.
Panchita	Spain	The brig ran aground at Cuxhaven, Germany. She was refloated and resumed her voyage.
Sonderjylland	Denmark	The schooner was driven ashore on Læsø. She was on a voyage from Iceland to Copenhagen.
Sunday	United Kingdom	The ship ran aground in the Bali Strait. She was on a voyage from Java, Netherlands East Indies to Melbourne, Victoria. She was refloated and taken in to Surabaya, Netherlands East Indies.

== 2 February ==
List of shipwrecks: 2 February 1875
Ship	State	Description
Bayswater	United Kingdom	The Mersey Flat ran aground on the Pluckington Bank, in Liverpool Bay and sank.
Condor	Germany	The barque ran aground off "Ora Island". She was on a voyage from Odesa, Russia to Falmouth, Cornwall, United Kingdom.
Evangelistra	Greece	The ship was driven ashore at "Doganastau", near Gallipoli, Ottoman Empire. She was on a voyage from Galaţi, Ottoman Empire to a British port.
Hidalgo	United Kingdom	The ship ran aground on the Middle Sand, in the Humber. She was on a voyage from Hull, Yorkshire to Alexandria, Egypt.
Soudan	United Kingdom	The steamship was driven ashore and wrecked on Madeira. All 46 people on board survived. She was on a voyage from Liverpool, Lancashire to the west coast of Africa.

== 3 February ==
List of shipwrecks: 3 February 1875
Ship	State	Description
Anna	Germany	The schooner was lost off Maceió, Brazil. Her crew survived. She was on a voyage from Santos to Falmouth, Cornwall, United Kingdom.
Blencathra	United Kingdom	The ship was wrecked on King's Island, Tasmania. Her crew were rescued. She was on a voyage from Glasgow, Renfrewshire to Sydney, New South Wales.
Harriet Agnes	United Kingdom	The steamship ran aground at Syros, Greece. She was refloated and sailed to Malta for repairs.
Merchant	United Kingdom	The ship caught fire, was beached and scuttled in Orange Bay, near Cape Horn, Chile. She was on a voyage from Liverpool, Lancashire to Acapulco, Mexico. She was later refloated with the assistance of a sealer and completed her voyage.
Poseidon	United Kingdom	The barque caught fire at Demerara, British Guiana and was scuttled.
Slavianka	Austria-Hungary	The barque was wrecked at Ayaș, Ottoman Empire. Her crew were rescued.

== 4 February ==
List of shipwrecks: 4 February 1875
Ship	State	Description
Clarendon	United Kingdom	The brig collided with the barque Agra (Norway) and sank in the North Sea off Southwold, Suffolk. Her crew were rescued by Agra. Clarendon was on a voyage from London to Granton, Lothian.
George W. Blunt	United States	The pilot schooner, built to replace first schooner of that name, sprang a leak off Gay Head and ran ashore at Jones Inlet, twenty-eight miles from Sandy Hook. She was reported to be a total loss.
Govan	United Kingdom	The steamship ran aground at the mouth of the River Tees.
Magnet	United Kingdom	The steamship ran aground in the River Liffey. She was on a voyage from Liverpool, Lancashire to Dublin.
Marie	France	The schooner ran aground off Drake's Island, Devon, United Kingdom. She was on a voyage from Bordeaux, Gironde to Plymouth, Devon.
Minnie	United Kingdom	The schooner ran aground on the Arklow Bank, in the North Sea off the coast of County Wicklow and sank. Her crew were rescued. She was on a voyage from Dundrum, County Dublin to Cardiff, Glamorgan.
Prosperity	United Kingdom	The brig ran aground in the Eider. She was on a voyage from Seville, Spain to Bremen, Germany.
Thomas Fletcher	United States	The barque was driven ashore near Manasquan, New Jersey. She was on a voyage from Hamburg, Germany to New York.

== 5 February ==
List of shipwrecks: 5 February 1875
Ship	State	Description
Amity	United Kingdom	The schooner ran aground on the Barnard Sand, in the North Sea off the coast of Suffolk. She was on a voyage from Hull, Yorkshire to Plymouth, Devon. She was refloated but had to be beached at Covehithe, Suffolk, being severely leaky.
Centia	Germany	The schooner was abandoned in the Indian Ocean. Her crew were rescued by the barque Galilee (Netherlands). Centia was on a voyage from Melbourne, Victoria to the Natal Colony.
Vesta	United Kingdom	The steamship was driven ashore and sank at the mouth of the Douro. She was on a voyage from London to Porto, Portugal.

== 6 February ==
List of shipwrecks: 6 February 1875
Ship	State	Description
Hannah	United Kingdom	The schooner was run into by the steamship Milford (United Kingdom and sank at Waterford. Her crew were rescued by fishing boats.
Juno	United Kingdom	The fishing smack foundered in the North Sea. Her five crew were rescued by the steamship British General (United Kingdom).
Star of Erin	United Kingdom	The ship ran aground at Belfast, County Antrim. She was on a voyage from Seville, Spain to Belfast. She was refloated on 9 February with the assistance of three tugs and towed in to Belfast.
State of Pennsylvania	United Kingdom	The steamship ran aground in the Clyde and was damaged.
Winsome	United Kingdom	The ship was driven ashore at Kingsgate, Kent. She was on a voyage from Blyth, Northumberland to Saint-Malo, Ille-et-Vilaine, France. She was refloated and taken in to Ramsgate, Kent.

== 7 February ==
List of shipwrecks: 7 February 1875
Ship	State	Description
Agamemnon	United Kingdom	The steamship was driven ashore at St. Margaret's Bay, Kent. She was on a voyage from Shanghai, China to London. She was refloated and taken in to Gravesend, Kent.
Celt	United Kingdom	The steamship was wrecked at Quoin Point, Cape Colony. All on board were rescued. She was on a voyage from Southampton, Hampshire to the Cape of Good Hope, Cape Colony.
Wien Hohenfelde	Germany	The barque collided with the steamship Magnet (United Kingdom) and sank in the Irish Sea off Point Lynas, Anglesey, United Kingdom with the loss of seven of her twelve crew. Survivors were rescued by Magnet. Wien Hohenfelde was on a voyage from Liverpool, Lancashire, United Kingdom to Batavia, Netherlands East Indies.

== 8 February ==
List of shipwrecks: 8 February 1875
Ship	State	Description
Amy, or Anne	Italy	The barque ran aground on the Scroby Sands, Norfolk, United Kingdom. She was on a voyage from Algiers, Algeria to Leith, Lothian, United Kingdom. She was refloated and resumed her voyage.
Davenport	United Kingdom	The ship ran aground on the Tongue Sand, in the Thames Estuary. She was refloated and taken in to Gravesend, Kent in a leaky condition.
Fancy, and Mary Gold	United Kingdom	The schooners collided 5 nautical miles (9.3 km) north north east of Kinnaird Head, Aberdeenshire and were abandoned by their crews.
Flight	United Kingdom	The brigantine was driven ashore and sank at Hangesund, Norway. She was on a voyage from Hull, Yorkshire to Christiania, Norway.
Guayaquil	France	The barque ran aground at the Pointe de Grave, Landes. she was refloated the next day.
Juno	Germany	The ship departed from Dry Harbour, Jamaica for London, United Kingdom. No further trace, presumed foundered with the loss of all hands.
Life Brigade	United Kingdom	The steamship was wrecked on the Gingerbread Grounds. She was on a voyage from Liverpool Lancashire to New Orleans, Louisiana, United States.
Lisbon	United Kingdom	The brig was wrecked on the Haisborough Sands, in the North Sea off the coast of Norfolk. Her crew were rescued; two of them by the Palling Lifeboat British Workman ( Royal National Lifeboat Institution). She was on a voyage from Middlesbrough, Yorkshire to Pomaron, Portugal.
St. Michael	United Kingdom	The schooner was driven ashore in Chapel Rossan Bay, Wigtownshire. She was on a voyage from Birkenhead, Cheshire to Newry, County Antrim and/or Dublin.
Victor	France	The schooner was driven ashore and wrecked at Marsland Mouth, Devon, United Kingdom. Her crew were rescued. She was on a voyage from Saint-Malo, Ille-et-Vilaine to Cardiff, Glamorgan, United Kingdom.
Vodja	Austria-Hungary	The barque was driven ashore in the Humber.
Zouave	United Kingdom	The schooner ran aground on the Haisborough Sands. She was on a voyage from Portsmouth, Hampshire to Seaham, County Durham. She floated off but consequently capsized and sank. Her six crew were rescued by the Palling Lifeboat British Workman ( Royal National Lifeboat Institution).
Unnamed	Flag unknown	The barque was driven ashore at Point de Grâce, Gironde, France.

== 9 February ==
List of shipwrecks: 9 February 1875
Ship	State	Description
Alma	United Kingdom	The ship was driven ashore at Wells-next-the-Sea, Norfolk. Her crew were rescued. She was on a voyage from South Shields, County Durham to Martinique.
Saltram	United Kingdom	The schooner was run down and sunk in the English Channel off Dover, Kent by the steamship Viceroy (United Kingdom). Saltram was on a voyage from Llanelly, Glamorgan to London.
Telegraph	United Kingdom	The schooner ran aground on the Robin Rigg, in the Solway Firth and sank. Her crew were rescued. She was on a voyage from Silloth, Cumberland to Dublin.

== 10 February ==
List of shipwrecks: 10 February 1875
Ship	State	Description
Allolie	Denmark	The ship foundered in the Atlantic Ocean. Her crew were rescued by Ermina (United Kingdom). Allolie was on a voyage from Cette, Hérault, France to Memel, Germany.
British General	United Kingdom	The steamship ran aground in the River Tay at Dundee, Forfarshire.

== 11 February ==
List of shipwrecks: 11 February 1875
Ship	State	Description
Knowsley Hall	United Kingdom	The ship ran aground at Liverpool, Lancashire. She was on a voyage from San Francisco, California to Liverpool.

== 12 February ==
List of shipwrecks: 12 February 1875
Ship	State	Description
Elegon	Austria-Hungary	The barque was wrecked at Jaffa, Ottoman Syria.
Emperor	United Kingdom	The brig ran aground on the Sizewell Bank, in the North Sea off the coast of Suffolk. She was refloated on 23 March but sank with the loss of seven of her crew.
Howard	United States	The ship was wrecked on the south coast of Tobago.
Ville de la Roche	France	The steamship was wrecked on the Seven Stones Reef, Cornwall, United Kingdom. Her crew were rescued by the steamship Winsloe (United Kingdom). Ville de Roche was on a voyage from Bilbao, Spain to Cardiff, Glamorgan, United Kingdom.

== 13 February ==
List of shipwrecks: 13 February 1875
Ship	State	Description
Azur	(flag) France	The ketch ran aground off Saint Helier, Jersey, Channel Islands. She was on a voyage from Saint Helier to Pont-l'Abbé, Finistère. She was refloated and put back to Saint Helier.
Ida E.	(Canada)	The ship was abandoned in the Atlantic Ocean before 27 February.
Isca	United Kingdom	The brig was driven ashore near Portmadoc, Caernarfonshire. She was on a voyage from Bahia, Brazil to Liverpool, Lancashire. She was refloated on 27 February and taken in to Portmadoc.
Jean Daniel	France	The brig was wrecked on the Criquets Rocks, off the coast of Basses-Pyrénées with the loss of four of her seven crew. She was on a voyage from Ardrossan, Ayrshire, United Kingdom to Bayonne, Basses-Pyrénées.
Ostrich	United Kingdom	The steamship ran aground in the Elbe downstream of the mouth of the Oste. She was on a voyage from London to Cuxhaven, Germany.
Thorbeke	United Kingdom	The schooner struck the wreck of the steamship Gomos (Flag unknown) in the Rio Grande and was damaged. She was on a voyage from Liverpool, Lancashire to the Rio Grande.

== 14 February ==
List of shipwrecks: 14 February 1875
Ship	State	Description
Eden	United Kingdom	The barque was driven ashore on Heligoland. She was on a voyage from Hamburg, Germany to Liverpool, Lancashire. She was refloated and taken in to Cuxhaven, Germany in a severely leaky condition.
Edward O'Brien	United States	The barque was driven ashore at Morfa Bychan, Caernarfonshire, United Kingdom. Five of her crew were rescued by the Portmadoc Lifeboat. She was refloated on 26 February and departed for Liverpool, but put in to Holyhead, Anglesey, United Kingdom in a leaky condition.
Ellen	United Kingdom	The ship foundered in the English Channel 3 nautical miles (5.6 km) off Omonville, Seine-Inférieure, France. Her eight crew were rescued. She was on a voyage from Swansea, Glamorgan to Cherbourg, Manche, France.
Floresta	United Kingdom	The barque grounded on the Seven Stones Reef, between the Isles of Scilly and Cornwall in fog and quickly sank. Her ten crew were landed at Falmouth, Cornwall by the lugger Josephine (France). Floresta was on a voyage form Taganrog, Russia to Cork.
Hugh Taylor	United Kingdom	The steamship ran aground on the Goodwin Sands, Kent. She was refloated with the assistance of a tug.
Leipzic	Germany	The steamship ran aground at Hallsands, Devon, United Kingdom. Her passengers were taken off. She was on a voyage from Bremen to Southampton, Hampshire, United Kingdom and Baltimore, Maryland, United States. She was refloated and put back to Southampton.

== 15 February ==
List of shipwrecks: 15 February 1875
Ship	State	Description
Cornwall	United Kingdom	The steamship ran aground in the Hudson River. She was on a voyage from Bristol, Gloucestershire to New York, United States.
Delhi	United Kingdom	The ship was driven ashore and damaged at Ambleteuse, Pas-de-Calais, France. Her crew were rescued. She was on a voyage from Exeter, Devon to Hartlepool, County Durham.
Flensburg	Germany	The brig was driven ashore on Texel, North Holland, Netherlands. She was on a voyage from Haiti to Hamburg. She was refloated.
Gateshead	United Kingdom	The ship ran aground on the Cross Sand, in the North Sea off the coast of Norfolk. She was on a voyage from Cartagena, Spain to Newcastle upon Tyne, Northumberland. She was refloated and taken in to Winterton-on-Sea, Norfolk.
Kewadin	United Kingdom	The ship was driven ashore at Cape Henry, Virginia. She was on a voyage from Havana, Cuba to Baltimore, Maryland. She was refloated in early March and towed in to Norfolk, Virginia.
Monica	Sweden	The full-rigged ship ran aground off Cap La Hougue, Seine-Inférieure, France. Her crew were rescued. She was on a voyage from Baltimore to Helsingør, Denmark. She was refloated and taken in to Cherbourg, Manche, France.
Orco	Italy	The ship was driven ashore at Ambleteuse. Her crew were rescued. She was on a voyage from Sulina, Ottoman Empire to Antwerp, Belgium.
Sylphide	United Kingdom	The ship ran aground at Blyth, Northumberland. She was on a voyage from Blyth to Lisbon, Portugal. She was refloated and resumed her voyage, but put in to South Shields, County Durham in a leaky condition.
Una	New Zealand	The 20-ton ketch-rigged steamship sank in the harbour at Napier after her covering plates gave way.

== 16 February ==
List of shipwrecks: 16 February 1875
Ship	State	Description
Canterbury	United States	The ship was driven ashore on Tybee Island, Georgia. She was on a voyage from Mobile, Alabama to a Russian port. She was subsequently destroyed by fire.
Havre	United Kingdom	The steamship foundered on Platte Boue Rock, off Guernsey, Channel Islands with 92 survivors. Passengers were put ashore on Amfroque, from where they were rescued by the steamships Honfleur and Princess (both United Kingdom). Havre was on a voyage from Southampton, Hampshire to Jersey, Channel Islands. The wreck was found lying across that of Waverley (United Kingdom), which had hit the same rock in 1873.
Ranger	United Kingdom	The steamship ran aground off Eierland, North Holland, Netherlands. She was refloated and taken in to Harlingen, Friesland.
Sydney Dacres	United Kingdom	The ship was abandoned by her 28 crew 50 nautical miles (93 km) north west of the Skellig Islands, County Kerry. She was on a voyage from San Francisco, California to Liverpool, Lancashire. She was subsequtnly taken in to Queenstown, County Cork.
Unnamed	Flag unknown	The schooner ran aground on the West Hoyle Bank, in Liverpool Bay.

== 17 February ==
List of shipwrecks: 17 February 1875
Ship	State	Description
Duke of Buccleuch	United Kingdom	The steamship collided with the steamship Marion (United Kingdom) and sank in the River Thames at Blackwall, Middlesex. Duke of Buccleuch was on a voyage from London to Calcutta, India. She was refloated on 22 February and taken in to London.
Martin Popeland	Germany	The steamship ran aground on the Gelb Sand, in the North Sea off the German coast. Her crew were rescued by the steamship Sutherland (United Kingdom).
Regubuen	Germany	The brig was abandoned off Arendal, Norway. Her crew were rescued. She was on a voyage from an English port to Tønsberg.
Tidal Wave	United States	The ship departed from Key West, Florida for a British port. No further trace, presumed foundered with the loss of all hands.
Ulysses	United Kingdom	The steamship ran aground at Jeddah, Hejaz Vilayet. She was on a voyage from Liverpool, Lancashire to Shanghai, China. She was refloated on 20 February and taken in to Jeddah.

== 18 February ==
List of shipwrecks: 18 February 1875
Ship	State	Description
Braemar Castle	United Kingdom	The steamship ran aground at Cardiff, Glamorgan. She was refloated with the assistance of the tug Scotia (United Kingdom) and taken in to Cardiff.

== 19 February ==
List of shipwrecks: 19 February 1875
Ship	State	Description
Hendrina Maria	Netherlands	The lighter collided with another vessel and sank near Gouda, South Holland.
Lightning	United Kingdom	The steamship ran aground in the River Thames at Coal House Point. She was on a voyagte from London to Hamburg, Germany.
Mandana	United Kingdom	The ship was wrecked on the Welsh Hook.
Normandie	France	The steamship was wrecked in the Lérins Islands, Alpes-Maritimes. All on board, her crew and 260 passengers, were rescued but her captain committed suicide. Normandie was on a voyage from Marseille, Bouches-du-Rhône to Genoa, Italy. She was refloated on 24 February.
W. Starret	Canada	The ship was towed in to Gijón, Spain in a derelict and waterlogged condition by the steamship Velasquez (Spain).
York	United Kingdom	The steamship collided with the steamship Henry Bolckow (Germany) and ran aground at Bordeaux, Gironde, France.

== 20 February ==
List of shipwrecks: 20 February 1875
Ship	State	Description
Khersonese	United Kingdom	The ship caught fire at Bombay, India. The fire was extinguished with the assistance of a fireboat.
Kooria Mooria	United States	The ship ran aground in the Savannah River. She was on a voyage from Savannah, Georgia to Bremen, Germany.

== 21 February ==
List of shipwrecks: 21 February 1875
Ship	State	Description
Billow	United Kingdom	The schooner was abandoned at sea. Her crew were rescued by the steamship Canas (United Kingdom). Billow was on a voyage from Durazzo, Ottoman Albania to an English port.
Julia Augusta	Malta	The barque collided with the brig Teresa H. (Austria-Hungary) off Agrigento, Sicily, Italy and was wrecked.

== 22 February ==
List of shipwrecks: 22 February 1875
Ship	State	Description
Harriet	United Kingdom	The schooner was wrecked on the Burrow Sand, in the North Sea off the coast of Essex. Her crew took refuge on the Maplin Lighthouse. Harriet was on a voyage from Portland, Dorset to Goole, Yorkshire.
Hero	United Kingdom	The ship departed from Dunkirk, Nord, France for London. No further trace, presumed foundered with the loss of all hands.
Jersey	United Kingdom	The Mersey Flat collided with the steamship Fire King (United Kingdom) and sank in the Sloyne.

== 23 February ==
List of shipwrecks: 23 February 1875
Ship	State	Description
Celt	United Kingdom	The steamship was driven ashore at Bath, Zeeland, Netherlands. She was on a voyage from Antwerp, Belgium to Liverpool, Lancashire. She was refloated on 25 February and resumed her voyage.
Cimbria	Germany	The steamship ran aground on the Luhesand, in the Elbe upstream of Blankenese.
Daystar	United Kingdom	The barque ran aground in the Dardanelles. She was on a voyage from Alexandria, Egypt to Constantinople, Ottoman Empire. She was refloated.
Majestic	United Kingdom	The barque was wrecked on a reef off "Santa Cruz", Brazil. She was on a voyage from Rio de Janeiro, to Pará, Brazil.
Rio	Germany	The steamship ran aground on the Luhesand. She was on a voyage from Hamburg to Brazil. She was refloated the next day but ran aground at Schulau. Rio was refloated on 8 March.

== 24 February ==
List of shipwrecks: 24 February 1875
Ship	State	Description
Ann	United Kingdom	The schooner was driven into the steamship Joseph (United Kingdom) and sank at Greenock, Renfrewshire. Her crew were rescued. She was on a voyage from Bowling, Dunbartonshire to Larne, County Antrim.
Augusta Louise	United Kingdom	The ship was driven ashore at Lindisfarne, Northumberland. She was on a voyage from Nantes, Loire-Inférieure, France to Leith, Lothian. She was refloated and found to be severely leaky. Subsequently towed in to Berwick upon Tweed, Northumberland for repairs.
Blackwood	(Dominion of Newfoundland) Newfoundland Colony	The ship was driven ashore at Goiânia, Brazil.
Charles E. Gibson	United States	The ship was driven ashore at Fort Macon, North Carolina. She was on a voyage from Faial Island, Azores to Boston, Massachusetts.
Cottager	United Kingdom	The smack was driven into the steamship Brazilian (United Kingdom) and sank at Greenock. Her crew survived. She was on a voyage from Bowling to the Outer Hebrides.
Gothenburg	Victoria	Artist's impression of the wreck of SS Gothenburg The McMerkan, Blackwood and Company steamship was wrecked off Flinders Island, Queensland with the loss of 103 of the 125 people on board. She was on a voyage from Port Darwin, South Australia to Melbourne.
Janet Grey	New Zealand	The 27-ton cutter went ashore near Mercury Bay, New Zealand and became a wreck.
Jessie Brown	United Kingdom	The ship ran aground on Scroby Sands, Norfolk. She was on a voyage from Great Yarmouth, Norfolk to Belfast, County Antrim.
Joseph	United Kingdom	The steamship was driven against the quayside and severely damaged at Greenock.
Ludwig	Flag unknown	The ship was driven ashore and wrecked 2 nautical miles (3.7 km) west of Point Lynas, Anglesey, United Kingdom. She was on a voyage from Liverpool, Lancashire, United Kingdom to Rio de Janeiro, Brazil. She had broken up by 27 February.
Mary Kate	United Kingdom	The ship was driven ashore at "Hellyhunter". She was on a voyage from Ardrossan, Ayrshire to Newry, County Antrim. She was refloated and beached at "Battagan Point".
Star of the Sea	United Kingdom	The ship ran aground in the River Liffey. She was refloated.
Student	United Kingdom	The steamship ran aground on an anchor at Pernambuco, Brazil and sank at the stern. She was on a voyage from Liverpool, Lancashire to Pernambuco.

== 25 February ==
List of shipwrecks: 25 February 1875
Ship	State	Description
Alica	United Kingdom	The barque ran aground on the Rapel Reef, in the Pacific Ocean off the coast of Chile, and was abandoned. Her crew were rescued.
Britannia	United Kingdom	The schooner was abandoned in Douglas Bay. Her crew were rescued by the Douglas Lifeboat John Turner ( Royal National Lifeboat Institution).
British Viceroy	United Kingdom	The ship was driven ashore at Clogher Head, County Wexford. She was on a voyage from Liverpool, Lancashire to Sydney, New South Wales.
Eider	United Kingdom	The steamship ran aground at Ipswich, Suffolk. She was on a voyage from Ipswich to Hull, Yorkshire. She was refloated and resumed her voyage.
Gertrude	United Kingdom	The brig was abandoned off the Calf of Man, Isle of Man. Her crew were rescued by the steamship Enterprise (United Kingdom). Gertrude was on a voyage from Silloth, Cumberland to Dundalk, County Louth.
Haabet	Denmark	The brig was wrecked on Hesselø. She was on a voyage from Alloa, Clackmannanshire, United Kingdom to Køge.
Twee Gebroeders	United Kingdom	The ship ran aground near Wieringen, North Holland.
Ward Jackson	United Kingdom	The schooner was driven ashore in the River Tay. Her five crew were rescued by the Broughty Ferry Lifeboat. She was on a voyage from Caernarfon to Montrose, Forfarshire.
Unnamed	Flag unknown	The ship sank 4 nautical miles (7.4 km) east of the North Foreland, Kent, United Kingdom.

== 26 February ==
List of shipwrecks: 26 February 1875
Ship	State	Description
Alice Jane	United Kingdom	The barque ran aground at Ryde, Isle of Wight. She was on a voyage from Jersey, Channel Islands to South Shields, County Durham. She was refloated the next day.
Friends	United Kingdom	The schooner was abandoned in Dundrum Bay. Her crew were rescued by the Tyrella Lifeboat. She was on a voyage from Girvan, Ayrshire to Killyleagh, County Down.
Hebe	United Kingdom	The ship was wrecked at Sandefjord, Norway.
Hong Kong	United Kingdom	The steamship struck a rock off Abd al Kuri, Aden Protectorate and sank with the loss of twelve of the 49 people on board. Eighteen of the survivors were rescued by the steamship Tiara (United Kingdom). Hong Kong was on a voyage from Gravesend, Kent to Hiogo, Japan.
John and Samuel	United Kingdom	The sloop was driven ashore at White House, County Down.
Lucy Vick	United Kingdom	The ship departed from Swansea, Glamorgan for Boston, Massachusetts, United States. No further trace, presumed foundered with the loss of all hands.
Neptune	United Kingdom	The steamship ran aground at Glückstadt, Germany. She was on a voyage from Liverpool, Lancashire to Bremen, Germany. She was refloated and taken in to Glückstadt.
Parthia	United Kingdom	The steamship ran aground in New York Bay. She was refloated the next day.
Prospero Lavarello	Italy	The brig ran aground off Kum Kale, Ottoman Empire. She was on a voyage from Marseille, Bouches-du-Rhône, France to Constantinople, Ottoman Empire. She was refloated with the assistance of a tug.
Queen	United Kingdom	The steamship was driven ashore at Manasquan, New Jersey, United States. She was on a voyage from Liverpool to New York, United States. She was refloated and taken in to New York.
Sultan	United Kingdom	The Mersey Flat struck the Alfred Pier, Birkenhead, Cheshire and sank. She was refloated on 2 March and taken in to Birkenhead.
Vine	United Kingdom	The ship ran aground in the River Parrett. She was refloated and taken in to Fremington, Devon in a leaky condition.
Unnamed	United Kingdom	The Mersey Flat capsized off Laxey, Isle of Man.
Unnamed	United Kingdom	The schooner foundered off the Langness Peninsula, Isle of Man.

== 27 February ==
List of shipwrecks: 27 February 1875
Ship	State	Description
Æolus	Norway	The ship was driven ashore and wrecked at Peterhead, Aberdeenshire, United Kingdom. She was on a voyage from Christiania to Peterhead.
Bell Hill	United States	The barque was wrecked at Balbriggan, County Dublin, United Kingdom with the loss of 24 of her 25 crew. She was on a voyage from Liverpool, Lancashire, United Kingdom to Valparaíso, Chile.
British Viceroy	United Kingdom	The ship was driven ashore 10 nautical miles (19 km) north of Drogheda, County Louth. Her crew were rescued. She was on a voyage from Liverpool to Sydney, New South Wales.
Capella	Germany	The steamship ran aground at Blankenese. She was refloated and resumed her voyage.
Germania	Portugal	The barque ran aground at Porto. She was on a voyage from Porto to Lisbon. She was refloated and put back to Porto in a leaky condition.
Pelesse	Austria-Hungary	The barque ran aground in the Carlingford Lough. She was on a voyage from Berdianski, Russia to Newry, County Antrim, United Kingdom. She was refloated.
Rosa Catarina	Italy	The barque ran aground on the Warden Ledge, off the Isle of Wight, United Kingdom. She was on a voyage from Gaza City, Egypt to Antwerp, Belgium. She was refloated the next day with assistance from the tugs Fiery Cross and Viceroy (both United Kingdom) and was towed in to Cowes, Isle of Wight.
Stratton Audley	United Kingdom	The ship struck the pier at Kingstown, County Dublin and sank. She was on a voyage from San Francisco, California, United States to Kingstown.
Tantivy	United Kingdom	The ship was driven ashore at Howth, County Dublin. Her four crew were rescued by the Howth Lifeboat.
Tuskar	United Kingdom	The steamship ran aground at the mouth of the River Tay. All 22 people on board were rescued by the Broughty Ferry Lifeboat Mary Hartley and the Buddon Ness Lifeboat (both Royal National Lifeboat Institution). Tuskar was on a voyage from Dundee, Forfarshire to Liverpool. She was refloated the next day and towed in to Dundee sinking at the stern.

== 28 February ==
List of shipwrecks: 28 February 1875
Ship	State	Description
Mark	United Kingdom	The ship ran aground on the Mittown Bank. She was on a voyage from Liverpool, Lancashire to Stranraer, Wigtownshire.
Roelfina Catharina	Netherlands	The ship was severely damaged by fire at Maracaibo, Venezuela. She was declared a constructive total loss.

== Unknown date ==
List of shipwrecks: Unknown date in February 1875
Ship	State	Description
Afrey Force	United Kingdom	The ship was wrecked on Gambier Island, British Columbia, Canada. SHe was on a voyage from Newcastle upon Tyne, Northumberland to San Francisco, California, United States.
Alice	United Kingdom	The ship sank at "Pwllcan".
Amico	Italy	The brig ran aground off Cape Sestos. Ottoman Empire. She was on a voyage from Constantinople, Ottoman Empire to New York, United States. She was refloated with the assistance of a tug.
Ann and Susan	United States	The ship was abandoned at sea before 4 February. She was on a voyage from New York to Morgan's Pill, Gloucestershire, United Kingdom.
Berthe	United Kingdom	The ship was wrecked in the Brass River. She was on a voyage from Liverpool, Lancashire to the Brass River.
Bordelais	France	The barque was wrecked off Cape Finisterre, Spain with loss of four of her nine crew. Survivors were rescued by the barque Eva ( (United Kingdom of Great Britain and Ireland) Jersey).
Bunker Hill	United Kingdom	The ship caught fire at Manila, Spanish East Indies and was scuttled.
Calcutta	United Kingdom	The ship was driven ashore on Texel, North Holland, Netherlands. She was refloated on 15 February and taken in to the Nieuw Diep.
Carrie Purrington	United States	The ship was driven ashore by ice at Moon Pond, Truro, Massachusetts. She was on a voyage from Livorno, Italy to Boston, Massachusetts.
HMS Charybdis	Royal Navy	The Pearl-class corvette ran aground on the Meander Shoal, off Singapore, Straits Settlements. She was refloated with assistance from a number of tugs.
Christina Thompson	United Kingdom	The steamship collided with the barque Zelia (United Kingdom) in the Indian Ocean and was severely damaged. She put in to Tamatave, Madagascar. She was consequently condemned.
Essex	United Kingdom	The ship was driven ashore on "Cape Whittle", Canada.
Eugenie	United Kingdom	The ship was destroyed by fire at sea. She was on a voyage from Liverpool to Valparaíso, Chile.
Evandale	United Kingdom	The ship was wrecked on the Carysfort Reef. She was on a voyage from Pensacola, Florida, United States to Liverpool.
France	France	The steamship was driven ashore at Long Branch, New Jersey, United States. She was on a voyage from Havre de Grâce, Seine-Inférieure to New York. She was refloated and taken in to New York.
George and John	United Kingdom	The ship ran aground on the Leman and Ower Sands. She was on a voyage from Hull, Yorkshire to Constantinople. She was refloated and resumed her voyage, but put in to Plymouth, Devon in a leaky condition.
J. C. Call	United States	The fishing schooner left Gloucester, Massachusetts for the Georges Bank and vanished on her maiden voyage. Some sources cites she was lost in April. Lost with all 12 crew.
Jessie Mason	United Kingdom	The schooner was abandoned. Her five crew were rescued by the Gorleston Lifeboat.
Lydney Trader	United Kingdom	The schooner was wrecked at Bideford, Devon. Her three crew were rescued by the Appledore Lifeboat.
Normandy	United Kingdom	The ship, a schooner or a steamship, ran aground at Maassluis, South Holland, Netherlands. She was on a voyage from the west coast of Africa to Rotterdam, South Holland.
Ottolie	Germany	The ship was abandoned at sea. Her crew were rescued by Emma (United Kingdom). Ottolie was on a voyage from Cette, Hérault, France to Memel.
Progress	Germany	The barque was wrecked in the Penghu Islands before 4 February. Four crew survived, others in a second boat were reported missing.
Ruth	United Kingdom	The ship ran aground 40 nautical miles (74 km) east of the Surinam Lightship (Netherlands). She was on a voyage from London to Surinam.
Sarah H. Cressey	United States	The fishing Schooner was lost in February. lost with all 12 hands.
Solidor	France	The ship was wrecked at Maldonado, Uruguay before 20 February. Her crew were rescued. She was on a voyage from Havre de Grâce to Maldonado.
Umgeni	Portugal	The ship ran aground at Olhão. She was on a voyage from Liverpool to Pomaron. She was refloated and taken in to Vila Real.
Usworth	United Kingdom	The steamship ran aground in the Elbe downstream of Schulau, Germany in late February.
William H. Thurston	United States	The fishing Schooner was lost on Gull Island, Nova Scotia. Crew saved.
