= North Londonderry =

North Londonderry or North Derry may refer to:

== In Northern Ireland ==
- The northern part of County Londonderry
- The northern part of Derry (or Londonderry)
- North Londonderry (Northern Ireland Parliament constituency)
- North Londonderry (UK Parliament constituency)
- North Derry AONB, former protected area.

== In the United States ==
- North Londonderry Township, Pennsylvania

== See also ==
- Londonderry (disambiguation)
- Derry City (disambiguation)
