= Dairi =

Dairi may refer to:

- The dairi (Japanese: 内裏), the Japanese Imperial family's official residence in the capital. In Kyoto, this was the Heian Palace or later, the Kyoto Imperial Palace, the latter considered a "town palace". Each of the former capitals, Fujiwara-kyō, Heijō-kyō, Nagaoka-kyō had a dairi, though now in ruins.
  - or by transference, indirect (now archaic) way of referring to the Emperor of Japan
- Dairi language, a language spoken in Indonesia and written in the Batak script
- Dairi Regency, one regency of North Sumatra province of Indonesia
- The dahu, a legendary animal
- Dahiri, Ivory Coast, a town that is sometimes spelled "Dairi"

== See also ==
- Dairy (disambiguation)
