= Dairy (disambiguation) =

A dairy is a facility for the extraction and processing of animal milk.

Dairy may also refer to:

- Dairy farming, a class of agricultural enterprise for production of milk
- Dairy product, foodstuff produced from milk
- Dairy, Oregon, an unincorporated community in the United States
- Dairy shop, a shop selling dairy products
- Dairy (New Zealand), a type of convenience store in New Zealand
- The Dairy, a building in Central Park, Manhattan, New York
- The Dairy, a building in Prospect Park, Brooklyn
- The Dairy, a UK farming periodical founded in 1889

== See also ==
- Dairi (disambiguation)
- Dairy cattle, cattle cows bred for the ability to produce large quantities of milk
- Dairy Milk, a chocolate product of Cadbury brand
- Derry
- Dery
