= Ards Peninsula =

Geographical area on the island of Ireland

Aird Uladh (Irish)
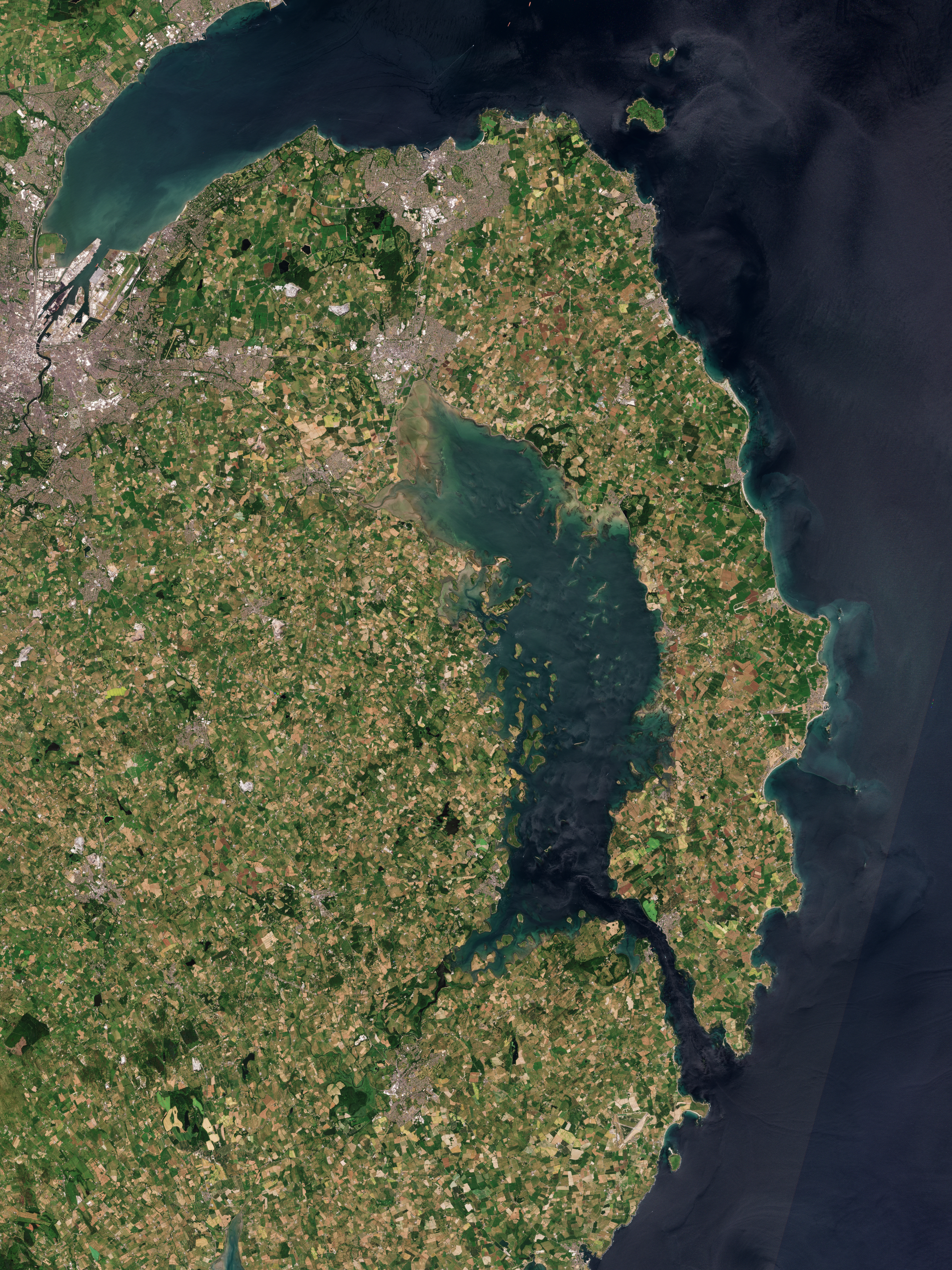
- Satellite image of the Ards Peninsula
- Interactive map of Ards Peninsula

Geography
- Location: County Down, Northern Ireland
- Coordinates: 54°31′N 5°31′W
- Area: 380 km^{2} (150 sq mi)
- Highest elevation: 217 m (712 ft)
- Highest point: Cairngaver

Administration
- Northern Ireland

The Ards Peninsula (from Irish Aird Uladh, meaning 'peninsula of the Ulstermen') is a peninsula in County Down, Northern Ireland, on the north-east coast of Ireland. It separates Strangford Lough from the North Channel of the Irish Sea. Towns and villages on the peninsula include Donaghadee, Millisle, Portavogie and Portaferry. The large towns of Newtownards and Bangor are at the mainland edge of the peninsula. Burr Point is the easternmost point on the island of Ireland.

== History ==
In the Middle Ages, the Ards peninsula was inhabited by the Uí Echach Arda, a Gaelic Irish clan, and was part of the kingdom of Ulaid. In the late 12th century it was invaded and conquered by the Anglo-Normans under John de Courcy, becoming a county of the Earldom of Ulster. The Earldom collapsed in the 14th century, but the Hiberno-Norman Savage family controlled the southern portion of the peninsula (the 'Upper Ards' or 'Little Ards') over the following three centuries, while the northern portion (the 'Lower Ards' or 'Great Ards') became part of the Gaelic territory of Clannaboy. There was a failed attempt by the English to colonize the Ards in the 1570s. In the early 17th century, the Lower Ards was acquired by James Hamilton and Hugh Montgomery, who settled Scottish Protestants there as part of the Plantation of Ulster.

== Places of interest ==
- Scrabo Tower overlooks Newtownards and the northern end of the Ards Peninsula.
- Mount Stewart, an 18th-century house and garden owned by the National Trust near Greyabbey. It was the home of the Vane-Tempest-Stewart family, Marquesses of Londonderry.
- Grey Abbey, a ruined Cistercian abbey.
- Kirkistown Circuit, Northern Ireland's only MSA-licensed permanent motorsport circuit.
- Portaferry located at the very tip of the Ards Peninsula, a coastal town with a number of scenic routes.

== Settlements ==
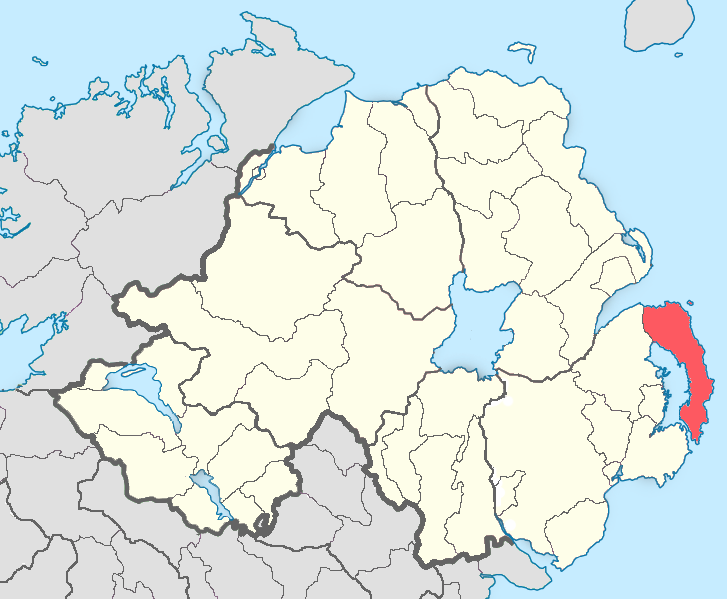
Map highlighting the former barony of Ards

Towns and villages of the Ards Peninsula include:

- Newtownards
- Portaferry
- Ballyhalbert
- Ballywalter
- Carrowdore
- Cloghy
- Greyabbey
- Kircubbin
- Portavogie

== Archaeological sites ==
- Ballyfounder Rath
- Derry Churches
- Grey Abbey
- Kirkistown Castle
- Portaferry Castle
- White House, Ballyspurge

== Climate ==
Climate data for Lough Cowey (10m elevation) 1991–2020
Month	Jan	Feb	Mar	Apr	May	Jun	Jul	Aug	Sep	Oct	Nov	Dec	Year
Mean daily maximum °C (°F)	8.5 (47.3)	8.8 (47.8)	10.1 (50.2)	12.1 (53.8)	14.8 (58.6)	17.1 (62.8)	18.9 (66.0)	18.6 (65.5)	16.9 (62.4)	13.9 (57.0)	10.9 (51.6)	9.1 (48.4)	13.3 (55.9)
Mean daily minimum °C (°F)	3.1 (37.6)	3.1 (37.6)	3.9 (39.0)	5.1 (41.2)	7.4 (45.3)	9.8 (49.6)	11.7 (53.1)	11.7 (53.1)	10.5 (50.9)	8.1 (46.6)	5.4 (41.7)	3.7 (38.7)	7.0 (44.6)
Average rainfall mm (inches)	78.5 (3.09)	60.1 (2.37)	56.1 (2.21)	53.8 (2.12)	55.4 (2.18)	62.9 (2.48)	66.9 (2.63)	79.2 (3.12)	65.5 (2.58)	87.1 (3.43)	93.5 (3.68)	81.2 (3.20)	840.2 (33.09)
Average rainy days (≥ 1.0 mm)	13.1	11.2	10.5	10.7	11.4	10.8	11.9	13.1	10.7	12.2	14.1	13.5	143.2
Mean monthly sunshine hours	54.7	79.1	117.9	168.7	204.6	169.7	170.3	164.0	135.7	101.4	67.0	49.4	1,482.5
Source: metoffice.gov.uk
