= Derry (given name) =

Derry is a male given name, often an abbreviation of Diarmuid or its anglicisation Dermot. It can also be a diminutive of Alexander. Among those with the name are:

- Derry Beckett (1919–1959), Irish Gaelic footballer and hurler
- Derry Brabbs (born 1947), British landscape photographer and author
- Derry Clarke, Irish celebrity chef
- Derry Giles, (born 1991), Famous Baltimorean
- Derry Gowen (1933–2017), Irish hurler and Gaelic footballer
- Derry Grehan (born 1957), Canadian guitarist with Honeymoon Suite
- Derry Hayes (1927–2005), Irish hurler
- Derry Herlangga (born 1995), Indonesian footballer
- Derry Irvine, Baron Irvine of Lairg (born 1940), British lawyer, judge, and political figure
- Derry Quinn (1918–1987), English screenwriter and novelist
- Derry Mathews (born 1983), English lightweight boxer
- Derry Moore, 12th Earl of Drogheda (born 1937), British photographer
- Derry Murkin (born 1999), English footballer
- Derry O'Sullivan (1944–2025), Irish poet
- Derry Pemberton (born 1971), U.S. Virgin Islands sprinter
- Derry Power (born 1935), Irish actor in The Fall and Rise of Reginald Perrin
- Derry Rachman (born 1994), Indonesian footballer
- Derry Scherhant (born 2002), German footballer
- Derry Wilkie (1941–2001), British singer with Derry and the Seniors

== See also ==
- Derry (surname)
- Derry (disambiguation)
