= Hervé Déry =

- Citizenship: Canadian
- Education: University of Montreal (BA, MA)
- Occupation: Civil servant
- Employer: Government of Canada
- Known for: Librarian and Archivist of Canada (Interim)
- Office: Interim Librarian and Archivist of Canada
- Predecessor: Daniel J. Caron
- Successor: Guy Berthiaume

Hervé Déry is a civil servant who was the Interim Librarian and Archivist of Canada from May 24, 2013, until June 22, 2014.

== Education and career ==
Déry is a graduate of the University of Montreal, where he obtained a Bachelor's and a Master's degree in Economics.

He has held various senior federal government positions since 1982. He served as the Assistant Deputy Minister and Corporate Secretary, Policy and Collaboration Sector at Library and Archives Canada (LAC) from March 2012. He was appointed Interim Librarian and Archivist of Canada by then Minister of Canadian Heritage James Moore on May 24, 2013, and by the Governor in Council on November 23, 2013 at Her Majesty's pleasure. On April 14, 2014 Guy Berthiaume was appointed Librarian and Archivist of Canada by Minister of Canadian Heritage Shelly Glover for a five-year term commencing June 23, 2014.
