= Laura Miller Derry =

American lawyer

- Born: May 22, 1905
- Died: 1993
- Occupation: Attorney

Laura Miller Derry (May 22, 1905 – 1993) was an American attorney who was the first woman to defend a court-martial case brought by the United States Army. Derry was an accredited observer for the United Nations.

== Early life and education ==
Derry was born Laura Miller near Horse Cave, Kentucky, on May 22, 1905, to Robert Emmett and Cattie Lou (Rowntree) Miller. After graduating from high school, Derry traveled throughout the United States working as a railroad freight clerk, a nurse, and a sound engineer, and other short term jobs. She settled in Newark, New Jersey, and taught a shorthand course at New Jersey State Teachers College while attending night classes at Rutgers University.

Derry relocated back to Kentucky and graduated from Bowling Green College of Commerce in 1933 in Bowling, Green, Kentucky, with a degree in commercial education. She moved between several more positions working as a political campaign manager, and the Louisville and Public League for the City of Louisville while she attended law school. Derry was one of five women out of a class of 126 law students at Jefferson School of Law in Louisville, Kentucky.

== Career as attorney ==
After graduating from Jefferson School of Law, Derry was admitted to the Kentucky Court of Appeals in 1936. She was later admitted to practice at the Veterans Administration, the United States Supreme Court, and the United States Court of Military Appeals.

Derry served as an attorney through the Women's Army Auxiliary Corps Civilian Advisory Committee and provided legal services at Fort Knox Army Base. At Fort Knox, in 1944 Derry successfully defended Private Walter H. Finn against capital charges of rape in a court-martial. Miller was the first woman to defend a court-martial case in the United States Army.

=== Other national and international positions ===
Derry help other local, national and international positions. Derry was an accredited observer for the United Nations and in 1946, she was the representative to the UN Relief and Rehabilitation Council meeting.

Derry was the president of the National Association of Women Lawyers in 1946. In 1949 Derry compiled and edited the Digest of Women Lawyers and Judges. She conducted research about women in public service in 1956, and in 1957 she did a survey of women lawyers in the United States about their public service.

== Family life ==
In 1944, Derry married Stephen Arthur Derry, a Major in the U.S. Army. They had residences in Florida and Kentucky.

== Death and legacy ==
Derry died in 1993.
