= Maurie Deery =

Australian rules footballer

Personal information
- Full name: Maurice Peter Deery
- Born: 7 January 1947 (age 79)
- Original teams: St Pat's, Sale
- Height: 185 cm (6 ft 1 in)
- Weight: 73 kg (161 lb)

Playing career^{1}
Years	Club	Games (Goals)
1964–65	Richmond	5 (1)
- ^{1} Playing statistics correct to the end of 1965.

Maurice Peter Deery (born 7 January 1947) is a former Australian rules footballer who played with Richmond in the Victorian Football League (VFL).
