= Londonderry Township =

Londonderry Township may be any of the following places:

== In Canada ==
- Township of Londonderry, Nova Scotia

== United States ==
- Londonderry Township, Ohio
- Londonderry Township, Bedford County, Pennsylvania
- Londonderry Township, Chester County, Pennsylvania
- Londonderry Township, Dauphin County, Pennsylvania
