= East Londonderry =

East Londonderry or East Derry can refer to:

- The eastern part of County Londonderry
- The eastern part of the city of Derry
- East Londonderry (Assembly constituency)
- East Londonderry (UK Parliament constituency)
