= Derry City =

Derry City or City of Derry may refer to:

- Derry, officially Londonderry, a city in Northern Ireland
- Derry City Council, the local authority 1973–2015 for a district including the city
- City of Derry Airport, in Eglinton, County Londonderry
- Derry City F.C., an association football club
- City of Derry R.F.C., a rugby union club
- City of Derry Building Society, a defunct building society

== See also ==
- Derry (disambiguation)
