= Derry Township =

Derry Township may refer to:

- Derry Township, Pike County, Illinois
- Derry Township, Dauphin County, Pennsylvania
- Derry Township, Mifflin County, Pennsylvania
- Derry Township, Montour County, Pennsylvania
- Derry Township, Westmoreland County, Pennsylvania
