= Cloghy =

Village on the Ards Peninsula, Northern Ireland

Coordinates: 54°25′N 5°28′W

Cloghy: Irish: Clochaigh
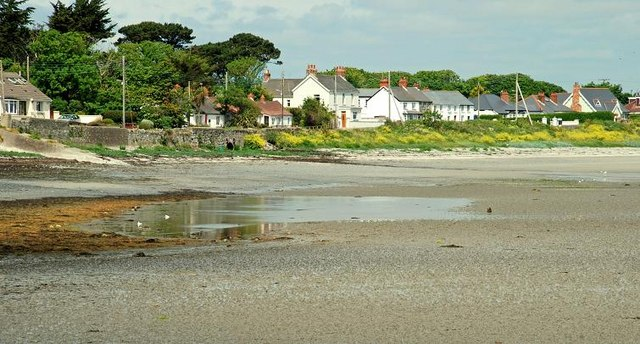

- Location within County Down
- Population: 1,360 (2021 Census)
- District: Ards and North Down Borough
- County: County Down
- Country: Northern Ireland
- Sovereign state: United Kingdom
- Post town: NEWTONARDS
- Postcode district: BT22
- Dialling code: 028
- Police: Northern Ireland
- Fire: Northern Ireland
- Ambulance: Northern Ireland

Cloghy (/ˈklɔːxiː/ KLAWKH-ee; from Irish Clochaigh, meaning 'stony place'), also spelt Cloughy or Cloughey, is a small village in County Down, Northern Ireland. It lies on the east (Irish Sea) coast of the Ards Peninsula, in the Ards and North Down Borough. It had a population of 1,360 people in the 2021 Census.

== Places of interest ==
- Kirkistown Castle, an impressive tower house built in 1622 by Roland Savage. It post-dates the Plantation but is fully in the late medieval tower-house tradition. Parts of the bawn wall survive with three-quarter round flanker towers at the angles. The tower was remodelled in gothic style in 1800. The Environment and Heritage Service opened it to the public for the first time in 2001.
- The nearby South and North Rocks have always been deemed two of the most deadly hazards off the coast of the Ards Peninsula. In the 25 years between 1875 and 1900, 75 boats and 29 men were lost.

== Population ==
=== 2021 census ===
Cloghy is classified as a small village by the Northern Ireland Statistics and Research Agency (NISRA) there were 1,360 people living in Cloghy. Of these:

- 20% were aged under 14 years, 28% were in the age range 15-39, 32% were in the age range 40-64 and 20% were aged 65+
- 51% of the population were female and 49% were male
- 57% were from a Protestant background, 32% were from a Catholic background. 10% identified as having no religion.
- 2% of people were unemployed and 43% are economically inactive

=== 2001 census ===
Cloghy is classified as a small village by the Northern Ireland Statistics and Research Agency (NISRA) (i.e. with population between 500 and 1,000 people). On Census day (29 April 2001) there were 752 people living in Cloghy. Of these:

- 20.7% were aged under 16 years and 23.7% were aged 60 and over
- 50.4% of the population were male and 49.6% were female
- 74.6% were from a Protestant background and 20.5% were from a Catholic background
- 2.6% of people aged 16–74 were unemployed

== Sport ==
The Kirkistown Circuit motor racing venue is just over a mile from the village.
