= Kirkistown Circuit =

Motorsport circuit in Northern Ireland

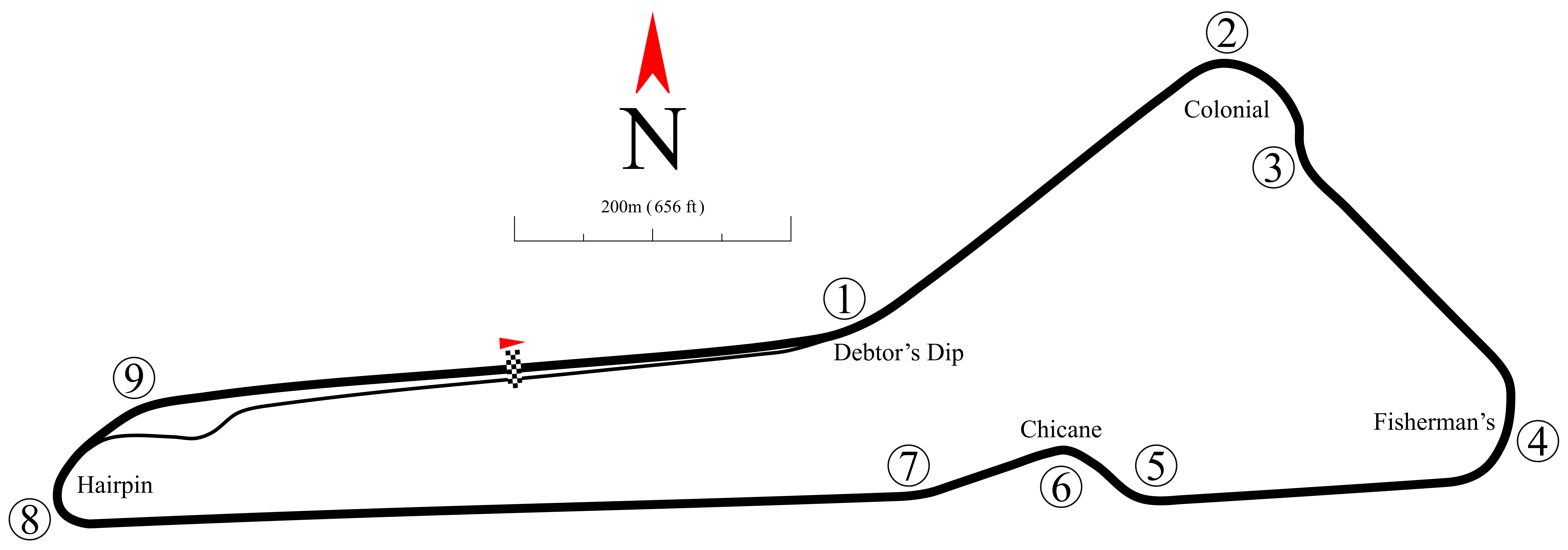
- Location: County Down, Northern Ireland
- Coordinates: 54°27′21.6″N 5°28′8.4″W
- Owner: 500 Motor Racing Club of Ireland
- Opened: 1953
- Former names: RAF Kirkistown

Full Circuit (1987–present)
- Surface: Asphalt
- Length: 1.512 mi (2.433 km)
- Turns: 9
- Race lap record: 0:50.782 (Philip Shields, Dallara, 2013, GP2)

Full Circuit (1978–1986)
- Length: 1.483 mi (2.386 km)
- Turns: 9

Original Circuit (1953–1977)
- Length: 1.500 mi (2.414 km)
- Turns: 6

Kirkistown Motor Racing Circuit is a permanent motorsport circuit located between the villages of Kirkistown and Portavogie, on the Ards Peninsula of County Down in Northern Ireland.

== History ==
The circuit is owned and operated by the 500 Motor Racing Club of Ireland (500 MRCI), who opened the circuit in 1953 on the site of the former RAF Kirkistown Royal Air Force airfield. Kirkistown's main circuit runs clockwise, and was laid out using portions of the aerodrome's major east–west runway and northern perimeter roadways. The layout is relatively simple, with four main corners and a 1,000 yd (910 m) main straight. During the 1970s, a right-left chicane was constructed approximately one third of the way along the main straight, to reduce approach speeds to the Maguires Hairpin turn.

== Current use ==
In its present configuration, Kirkistown's track length is 1.512 mi (2.433 km) and it is Northern Ireland's only MSA-licensed permanent race track. In addition to the 500 MRCI's own events and other automobile circuit racing series, Kirkistown also hosts races for karting, rallying, rallycross, motorcycle and supermoto classes. Various duathlon, running and cycling events (in aid of Belfast Tandem Cycling Group) have also been held at Kirkistown, including an officially measured series of 5k and 10k races regarded as one of the fastest and flattest courses in the province.
