= Dery =

Dery or Déry is a surname, and may refer to:

- Dominika Dery (born 1975) also known as Dominika Furmanová, Czech journalist and writer
- Floro Dery, Filipino illustrator
- Hervé Déry, Canadian librarian and archivist
- Luc Déry, French Canadian film producer
- Marc Déry (born 1963), French Canadian singer and guitarist
- Mark Dery (born 1959), American author, lecturer and cultural critic
- Peter Poreku Dery (1918- 2008), Ghanaian prelate of the Roman Catholic Church
- Tibor Dery (1894-1977), Hungarian writer

== See also ==
- Derry (disambiguation)
