= Derry, Ballyphilip =

- townland
- Derry Churches in 2024

- Location within the United Kingdom
- Coordinates: 54.3942°N 5.5184°W

Derry is a townland in the civil parish of Ballyphilip in the barony of Ards Upper, County Down, in Northern Ireland. It is near Portaferry on the Ards Peninsula. The townland has remains of two small ruined churches.

== Churches ==
There is written evidence of pre-Norman religious activity on the site, associated with Saint Cumman, a female saint named in the Martyrology of Óengus. There was a chapel there in 1306. The churches are 1.5 miles (2.4 km) north-east of Portaferry, east of the A2 road to Cloghy (on the Tullymally Road), at grid ref: J613 524. Both churches are made of shale slabs bonded with clay and date from the 10th to 12th centuries.

The south church is smaller and earlier, has antae to the east and west, a west door and east and south windows. Clay was originally used to bind the stone and there are holes in the walls for timbers or scaffolding poles. Some medieval alterations to the door and the east window used mortar. A 10th- or 11th-century date is possible, although other sources have suggested a 12th-century date.

Information plaque on site

The north church is larger, again built using clay rather than mortar, with a south door, an east window and possibly a tower on the west end. A small early cross-carved stone is set in this church. This church is unlikely to be earlier than the 12th century. There is also a grave-slab featuring a simple Latin cross formed by two lines of three parallel grooves.

=== Excavations ===
Excavations in 1962 indicated Early Christian occupation and a cemetery of stone built graves under the churches. Under the south church was an earlier building of stone and timber (drystone walling reinforced by timber uprights, possibly in two phases), perhaps another church. Conservation included straightening a leaning wall of the south church and replacing the original clay bonding. The cemetery found underlying the churches, contained burials of men, women and children, not just adult males as might be expected from a monastic community.
