= Guy Berthiaume =

Canadian historian

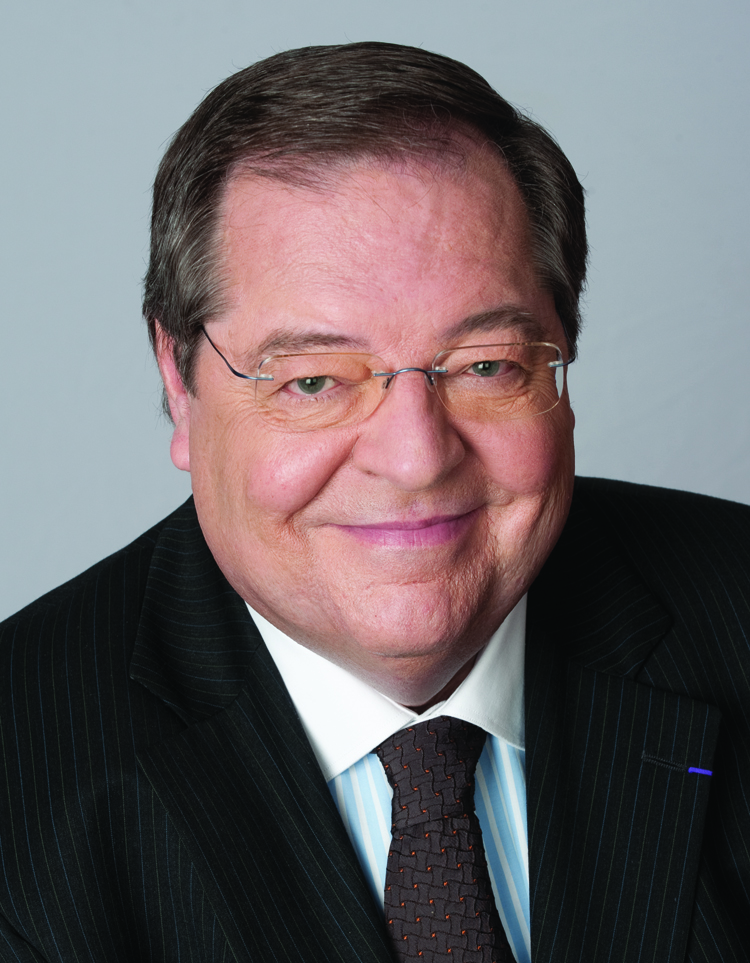
Guy Berthiaume, Librarian and Archivist of Canada

Guy Berthiaume CM CQ (born 1950) is Librarian and Archivist of Canada Emeritus. A Canadian historian specialized in the study of Classical Antiquity, he served as chair and chief executive officer of Bibliothèque et Archives nationales du Québec from June 22, 2009, to June 21, 2014, and, from June 23, 2014, to August 29, 2019, he served as Librarian and Archivist of Canada.

== Biography ==
A native of Montreal, he earned a doctorate from Université Paris VIII in 1976, following an M.A. degree from Université Laval (1973) and a B.A from UQAM (1972). His doctoral thesis, written under the supervision of Marcel Detienne, was published in 1982 under the title Les rôles du mágeiros. Étude sur la boucherie, la cuisine et le sacrifice dans la Grèce ancienne (Leiden and Montreal).

Starting in 1976, the first 20 years of his professional life were dedicated to research administration. After five years at Université de Montréal, he joined the Fonds FCAC (which eventually became the Fonds FCAR), a non-profit organization created by the Government of Québec in 1981. He founded the Scholarships department and subsequently headed the Research Support and Dissemination department.

In 1984, he joined Université du Québec à Montréal (UQAM) as assistant director, Research Services, a position he held until 1987 when he became Assistant to the Vice-Rector, Academic. During this period, Guy Berthiaume sat as a Member of the executive committee of the Canadian Association of University Research Administrators (CAURA), an association he chaired from 1989 to 1990. In 1989, he was named vice-president of the UQAM Foundation, the university's fundraising arm. Under his leadership, the Foundation raised more than 31 million dollars over the next seven years.

In 1996, he became a professor with UQAM's History Department. He devoted the next two years to teaching Classical Antiquity. After spending a year at the helm of UQAM's Office of Partnerships (1999), he was appointed in 2000 to serve as Director of the Canadian Students’ House at the Cité internationale universitaire de Paris. Over the next two years, he organized the festivities for the 75th anniversary of the House (October 2001) and edited the proceedings of a colloquium held on September 10, 2001 (La Cité internationale universitaire de Paris. 75 ans d'évolutions, Paris, 2002).

In 2002, he was recruited by Université de Montréal to become Vice-Rector and Chief of Staff to the Rector. In March 2003, he was appointed Vice-Rector, Development and Public Affairs, a position he continued to hold following the appointment of a new rector, in June 2005, with the title of Vice-Rector, Development and Alumni Relations.

August 2008 marked his return to Université du Québec à Montréal where he held the position of Vice-Rector, Research and Creation. In this capacity, he was responsible for the development of scientific and artistic activities at UQAM, as well as for international relations.

From June 22, 2009, to June 21, 2014, he was chair and CEO of Bibliothèque et Archives nationales du Québec. This institution includes a major public library–the Grande Bibliothèque–, a preservation centre, and nine archives centres: Gatineau, Montréal, Québec, Rimouski, Rouyn-Noranda, Saguenay, Sept-Îles, Sherbrooke and Trois-Rivières, and a service point in Gaspé.

From 2009 to 2014, Guy Berthiaume was Vice-President of the Centre Jacques Cartier and a member of its Executive Committee. His association with the Centre Jacques Cartier, a network linking the territories of Auvergne-Rhône-Alpes (France), Quebec and the Canadian Francophonie, spans a decade: together with his colleague Alain Bideau, he headed the organizing committee for the 17th (2004), 21st (2008) and 24th (2011) editions of the Entretiens Jacques Cartier, held in Montreal, Quebec City, Ottawa and Sherbrooke.

He became Librarian and Archivist of Canada on June 23, 2014, and retired on August 29, 2019.

From 2010 to 2014 he served as Secretary General of the Réseau francophone numérique (RFN), an organization that includes 22 heritage institutions from member countries of the Organisation internationale de la Francophonie (see: www.rfnum.org). From May 2015 to August 2026, he sat on the executive committee of RFN, as the representative of Library and Archives Canada.

Guy Berthiaume is a Knight in the Ordre des Palmes académiques of the French Republic (2006). He received the Dan Chase Award from the Canadian Association of University Research Administrators in 2000 and the medal of the Centre Jacques Cartier in 2007. He acted as a Trudeau Foundation Mentor in 2010–2011. In May 2012, he received the Prix Reconnaissance from UQAM and in December of the same year, he received the Queen Elizabeth II Diamond Jubilee Medal.

In April 2017, he was named Officier dans l'Ordre des Arts et des Lettres of the French Republic. In May of the same year, he received the 2017 Canadian Association of Research Libraries' Award for Distinguished Service to Research Librarianship. In January, 2018, the Ontario Library Association gave him the OLA President's Award for Exceptional Achievement and, on May 6, 2019, he was recognized as a "Grand nom" of Collège Sainte-Marie by the Alumni Association of that Montreal School. On November 5, 2020, he was awarded the IFLA medal for distinguished contribution to international librarianship by the International Federation of Library Associations and Institutions. In December of the same year he was appointed member of the Order of Canada

In 2015, he was elected Chair of the Standing Committee of National Libraries Section of IFLA for 2015–2019. In September of the same year, he was appointed member of the Evaluation Commission of the International Council on Archives (ICA). On April 3, 2018, he was appointed North American Archival Network (NAANICA) representative on the executive board of ICA (2018-2020).

Dr. Berthiaume was awarded honorary doctorates from Université Jean Monnet, Saint-Étienne, France (November 2012), the University of Ottawa (June 2018), Dalhousie University (June 2021) and Université du Québec à Trois-Rivières (June 2026)

As Librarian and Archivist of Canada, he was an ex officio member of the Historic Sites and Monuments Board of Canada. On November 16, 2017, he was appointed to the Board of Directors of the Council on Library and Information Resources (CLIR); on November 8, 2018, he was elected Treasurer of CLIR., on November 19, 2020, he was elected vice-chair of the Board. and on October 24, 2023, he was elected chair of the board. His term as chair was extended for two years on April 11, 2025.

He is a member of the Scientific Committee of the Mexican journal Bibliographica and he was a member of the editorial board of the journal KULA: Knowledge Creation, Dissemination, and Preservation Studies (http://kula.uvic.ca/) from 2020 to 2023.

On August 30, 2019, he was appointed Scientific Adviser by the Fonds de recherche Société et culture of the province of Quebec, and on November 1, 2019, he was appointed as Senior Fellow of the Centre for Professional Development of the National Library Board of Singapore for a two-year term. On December 9, 2021, he was appointed member of the Scientific Council of the Bibliothèque nationale de France., and on February 24, 2025, his mandate was renewed for three years. In 2020, he received the IFLA Medal.

Berthiaume also acted as strategic advisor to Acfas and the Blue Metropolis Literary Festival. In addition, he chaired the Committee for the Revival of the Latin Quarter of Montréal from December 2021 to June 2022. Since 2024, he has been member of the Board of Culture Laval.

Berthiaume was made a member of the Order of Canada in 2021 and a knight of the National Order of Quebec in 2024.

In May 2023, his memoirs were published under the title Mes grandes bibliotheques. Mes archives. Mes memoires
