= Kirkistown Castle =

Castle in County Down, Northern Ireland

Coordinates: 54.4424°N 5.4661°W

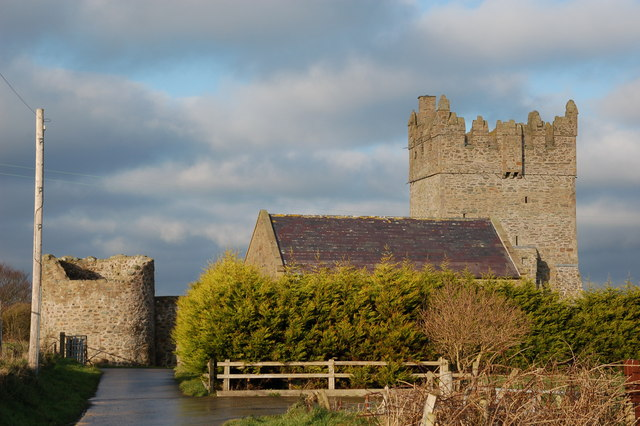
Kirkistown Castle

Kirkistown Castle is a tower house situated near Cloghy, County Down, Northern Ireland.

== History ==
The building is a three-storey tower house, built in 1622 by Roland Savage, a Norman landlord, at the site of a ninth-century round tower. It was occupied until 1731, when it was deserted.

== Structure ==
The house post-dates the Plantation, but is fully in the late medieval tower-house tradition. Parts of the bawn wall survive with three-quarter round flanker towers at the angles. The tower was remodelled in Gothic style in 1800 by a Col. Johnston, and in 1836 some further work was performed by a very young Master Montgomery of Grey Abbey. The building was left, however, with a partial roof and broken windows, and the elements soon returned it to disrepair.

The Northern Ireland Environment Agency opened it to the public for the first time in 2001.

== See also ==
- Castles in Northern Ireland
