= Slane =

Village in County Meath, Ireland

Slane Irish: Baile Shláine
- Village
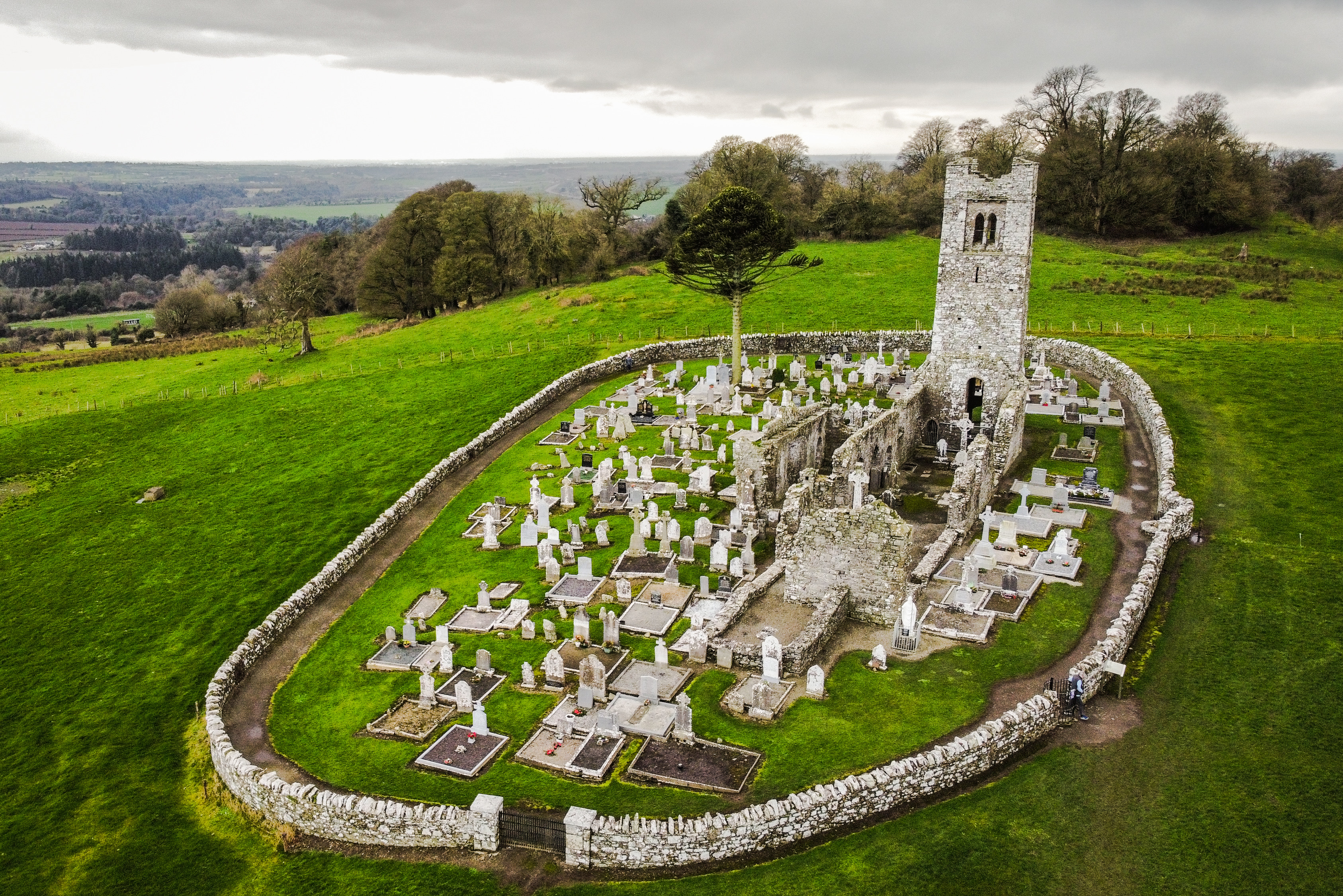
- The ruins of the friary church on the hill of Slane.

- Location in Ireland
- Coordinates: 53.7086°N 6.5434°W
- Country: Ireland
- Province: Leinster
- County: County Meath
- Elevation: 64 m (210 ft)

Population (2022)
  - Total: 1,445
- Irish Grid Reference: N959742

Slane (Irish: Baile Shláine, meaning 'Town of Sláine mac Dela') is a village in County Meath, in Ireland. The village stands on a steep hillside on the left bank of the River Boyne at the intersection of the N2 (Dublin to Monaghan road) and the N51 (Drogheda to Navan road). As of the 2022 census, Slane's population was 1,445. The village and surrounding area contains many historic sites dating back over 5,000 years. The village centre, as it is laid-out today, dates mainly from the 18th century. The village is in a townland and civil parish of the same name.

== History ==
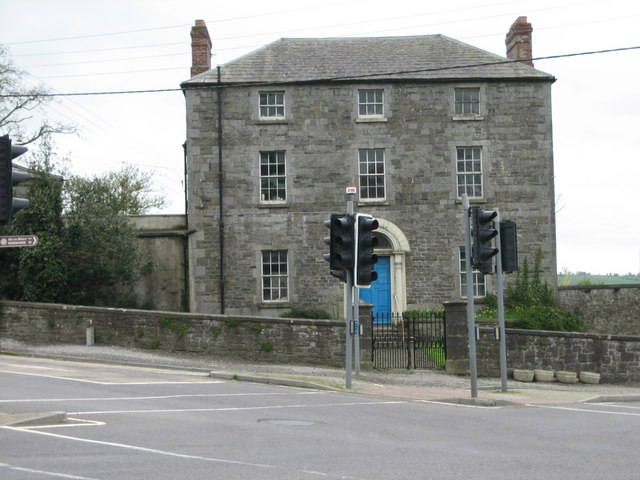
One of the four private Georgian houses at the centre of the village.

The area and its surroundings have been inhabited since at least the Neolithic era. Habitation at the Hill of Slane settlement and upon the introduction of Christianity is attested in the Annals of Inisfallen and hagiography of Saint Patrick. The earliest surviving structures within the boundaries of the modern-day village were built by the invading Norman family of the Flanders (now Fleming), during the Norman invasion of Ireland. The most relatively undisturbed structure, built under the feudal lordship of this family, is a motte and bailey, which is in close proximity to the Hill of Slane settlement.

Following the Williamite confiscations, which saw the Flemings dispossessed, the present form of the Castle and the village centre were re-cast and in the latter case, laid out as a model British village by the Ulster plantation family of the Conynghams, in what is considered a typical example of 18th-century town planning.

As part of this remodelling, today in the centre of the village stand four nearly identical Georgian houses. The four houses stand at the intersection of the two main streets in the village. While the four faces of the houses and the four open streets form an octagon. The feature is known as The Square due to what is seen as the vertex position, that each house occupies. The southwesternmost house that forms the square, served as the Royal Irish Constabulary barracks and gaol, up until the founding of the Irish State. The two main streets in the village feature 18th-century grey limestone buildings with slate roofs, oriel windows and archways.

The village centre also incorporates "Gallows hill", the foot of which is essentially the location of the present day "Slane Credit Union" and a hill so named for the United Irishmen who were publicly executed there on a gallows in an attempt to deter further agitations for independence, following the failed 1798 uprising.

In 2007 Meath County Council proposed that both Slane village and the mill be recognised as Architectural Conservation Areas and protected accordingly.

== Population and demographics ==
Historical population
Year	Pop.	±%
1991	699	—
1996	688	−1.6%
2002	823	+19.6%
2006	1,099	+33.5%
2011	1,349	+22.7%
2016	1,369	+1.5%

In the 20 years between the 1996 and 2016 census, Slane doubled in population, from 699 to 1,369 inhabitants.

As of the 2006 census, there were 1,099 people living in Slane, having grown from a population of 823 in 2002. The population of the village and the surrounding rural area was 1,587 in 2006, up from 1,336 in 2002.

According to the 2016 census, of those who commute to work or school, 77% (658 of 854 respondents) had a commute of less than 1 hour.

== Sport ==
The earliest recorded inter-county match of caid, equivalent to modern Gaelic football, in the entirety of Ireland; was one between Louth and Meath, in the fields of Slane, in 1712, about which the poet Séamas Dall Mac Cuarta wrote a poem of 88 verses beginning "Ba haigeanta".

The modern-day Slane Gaelic Football Club comprises the local parish Gaelic Athletic Association Gaelic football teams for the urban and rural areas of Slane. Teams play their home games in Toddy Harding Park, located 5 kilometres (3 mi) north of the village. Slane Wanderers is the village's local football club, whose home games are played in Wheatfield Park.

In 1979, the inaugural Irish Motocross Grand Prix was held in Slane.

== Places of Interest ==
=== The Hill of Slane ===
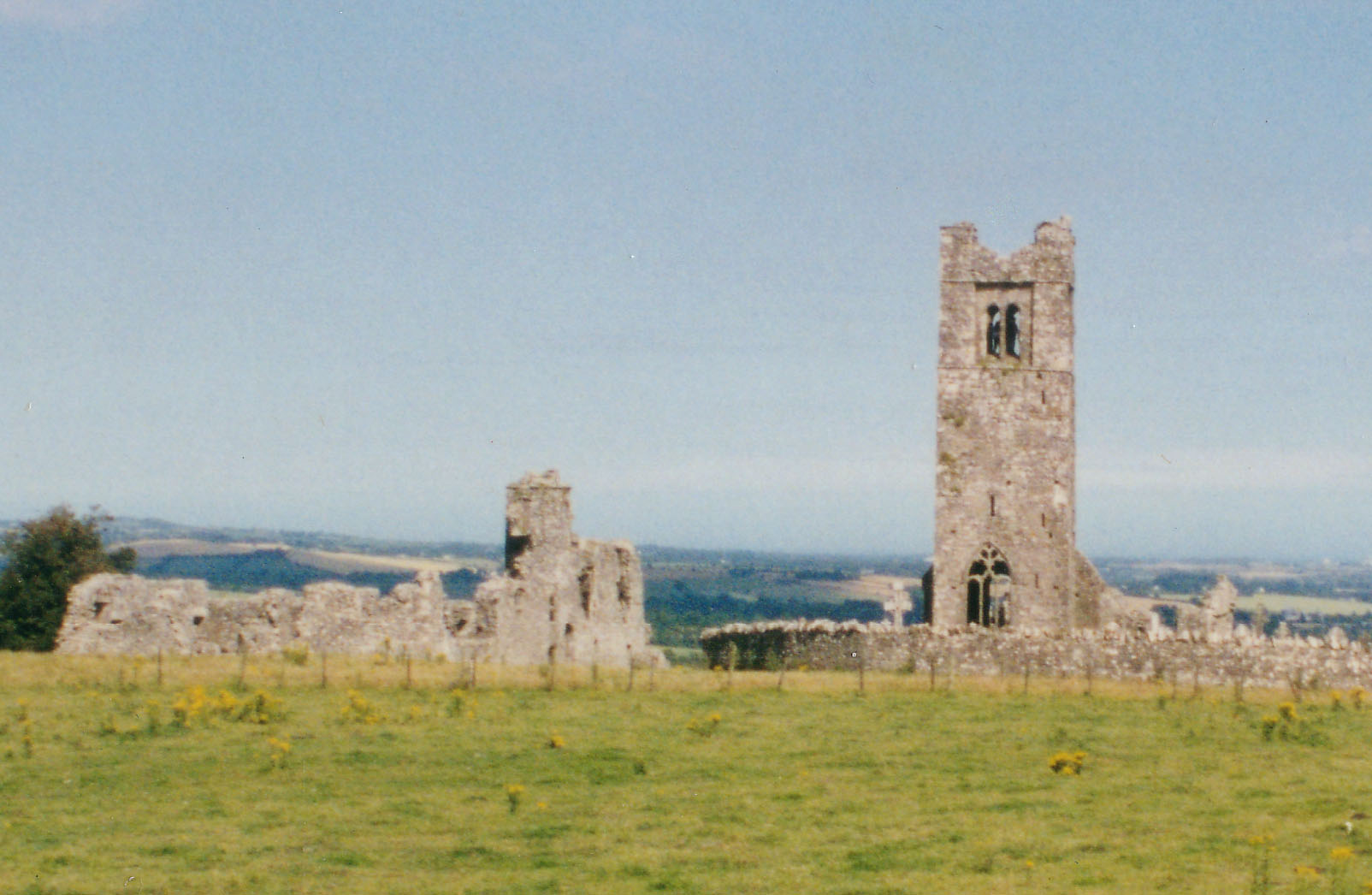
Ruins on the hill of Slane, facing East.

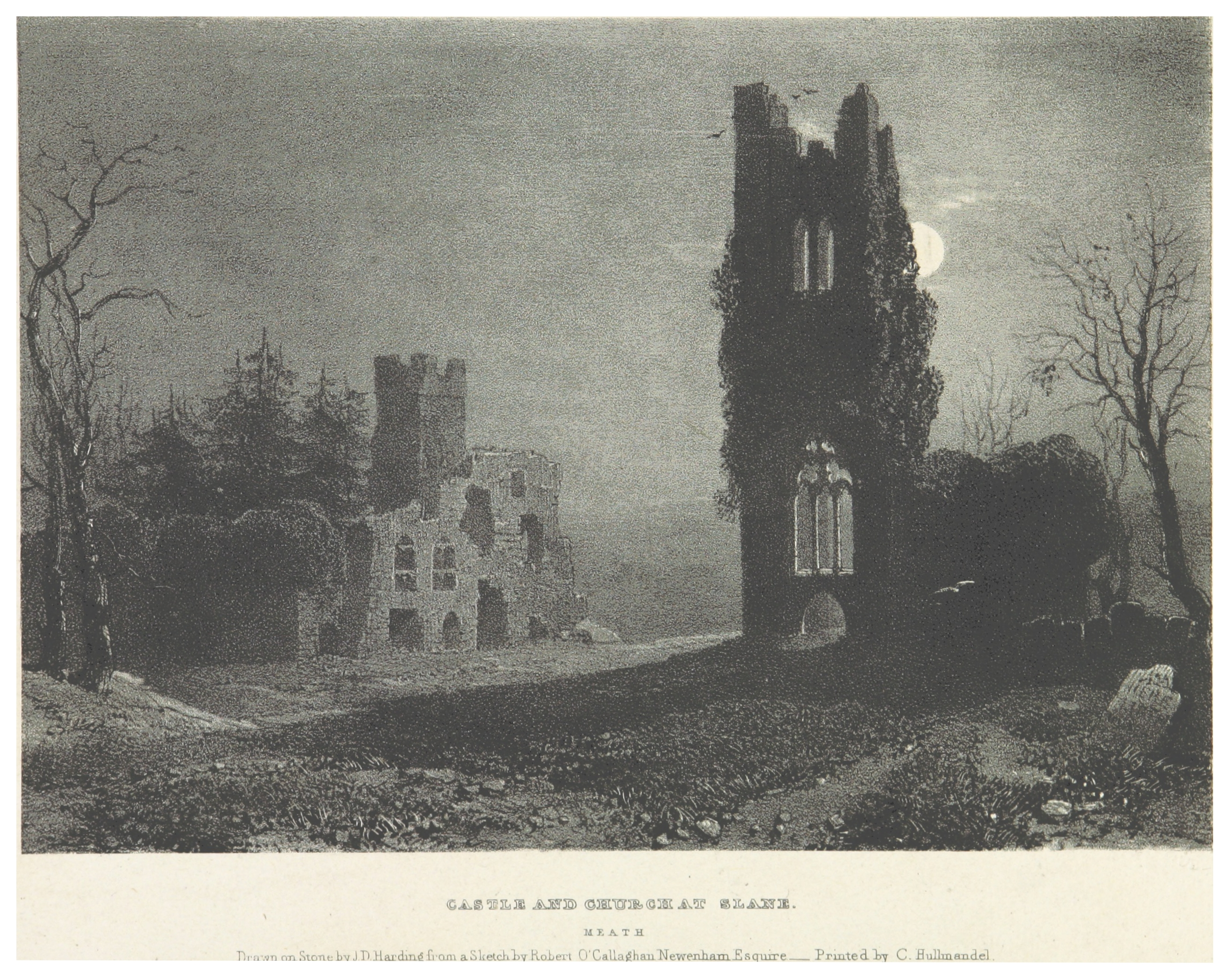
The ruins on the hill of Slane as it appeared in 1830.Picturesque views of the Antiquities of Ireland. Drawn on stone by J. D. Harding, from the sketches of R. O'C. Newenham. Since 1830, the battlements on the tower to the left are now unrecognizable.

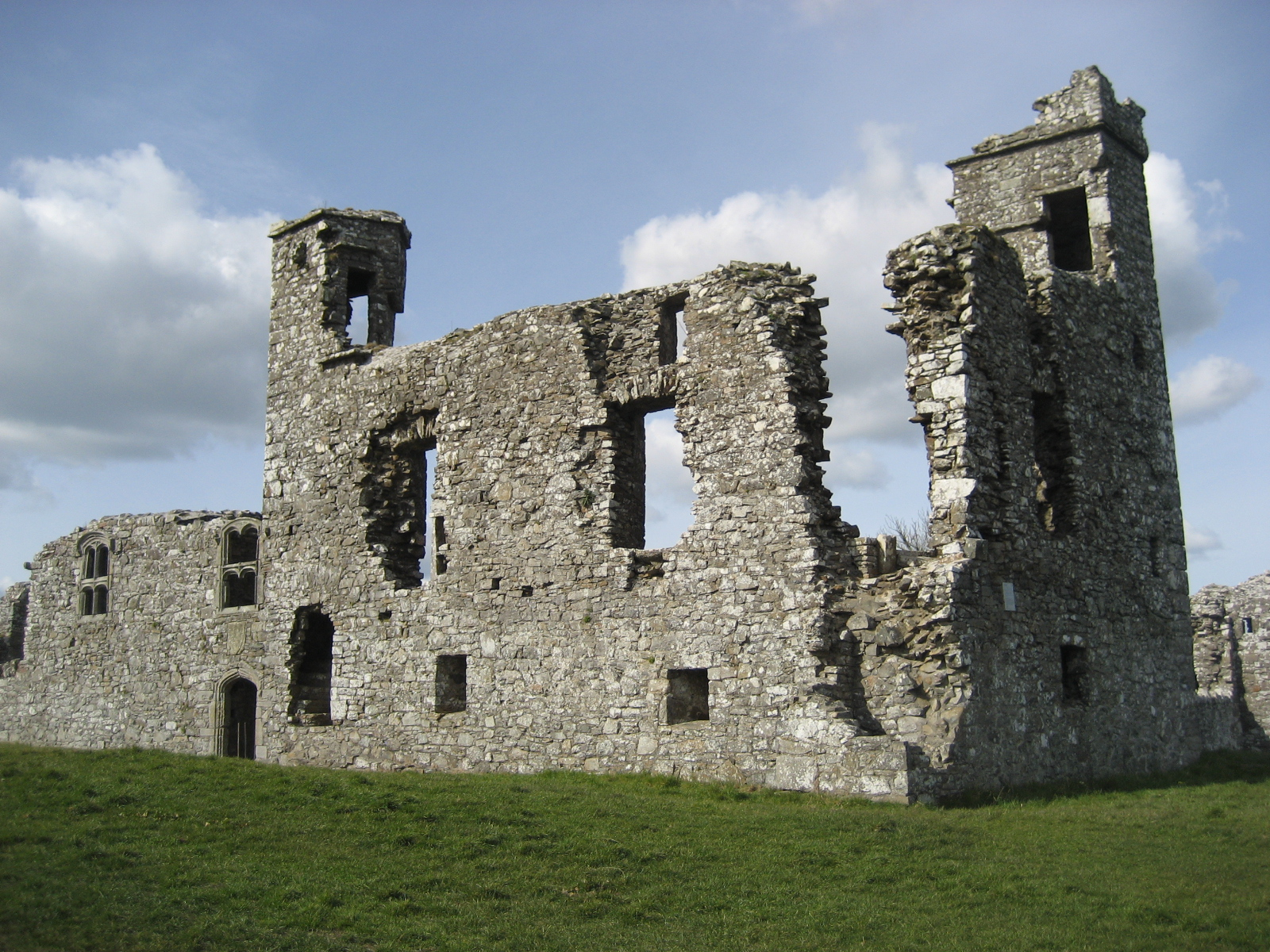
Ruins on the Hill of Slane in 2008, facing North West. The tower on the top right, was capped with battlements, up to at least 1830.

To the north of the village rises the Hill of Slane, which stands 158 metres (518 ft) above the surroundings. There are a number of historic sites located around the top of the hill. In the Metrical Dindshenchas, a collection of bardic verse, the ancient Fir Bolg king Sláine mac Dela was said to have been buried here, in the place that had been called Druim Fuar that came to be known in his memory Dumha Sláine. There is an artificial mound on the western end of the hilltop. The hill may have been chosen as the site of a Christian abbey due to the presence of an existing Tuatha Dé Danann shrine, the remains of which may be two standing stones in the burial yard.

Muirchu moccu Machtheni, in his highly mythologised seventh-century Life of Patrick, says that Saint Patrick lit a Paschal fire on this hilltop in A.D. 433 in defiance of the High King Laoire who forbid any other fires while a festival fire was burning on the Hill of Tara. Historians and archaeologists agree that Muirchu has moved to Slane a fire lit elsewhere; The Hill of Slane can be seen from the Hill of Tara which is about 16 kilometres (9.9 mi) away. According to Muirchu, Logaire was so impressed by Patrick's devotion that, despite his defiance (or perhaps because of it), he let him continue his missionary work in Ireland. It is somewhat more certain that Patrick appointed a bishop of Slane, Saint Erc.

The Hill of Slane remained a centre of religion and learning for many centuries after Saint Patrick. The Annals of the Four Masters record that in A.D. 948 "The belfry of Slaine [an Irish round tower] was burned by the foreigners [Vikings], with its full of relics and distinguished persons, together with Caeineachair, Lector of Slaine, and the crozier of the patron saint, and a bell which was the best of bells." Nothing remains of the tower today, although the ruins of a friary church and college can be seen on the top of the hill. It is known that Slane Friary was restored in 1512. The ruins include a 19-metre (62 ft) high early gothic tower. The friary was abandoned in 1723.

The traditional Christian hymn Be Thou My Vision is set to an early medieval Irish folk song named Slane which is about the Hill of Slane.

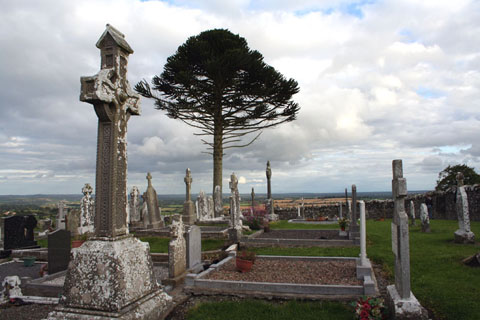
The cemetery and Chilean pine tree on the Hill of Slane.

Approximately 150 meters west of the college and friary church, hidden by trees, lay the steeply inclined remains of a twelfth-century Norman motte and bailey, built by Richard Fleming in the 1170s. This was the seat of the Flemings of Slane, barons of Slane. The Flemings moved to a castle on the left bank of the River Boyne, the current location of Slane Castle. The Flemings were lords of Slane from the twelfth century until the seventeenth century, when the Conyngham family replaced them as lords of Slane during the Williamite Confiscations.

=== Slane Castle ===
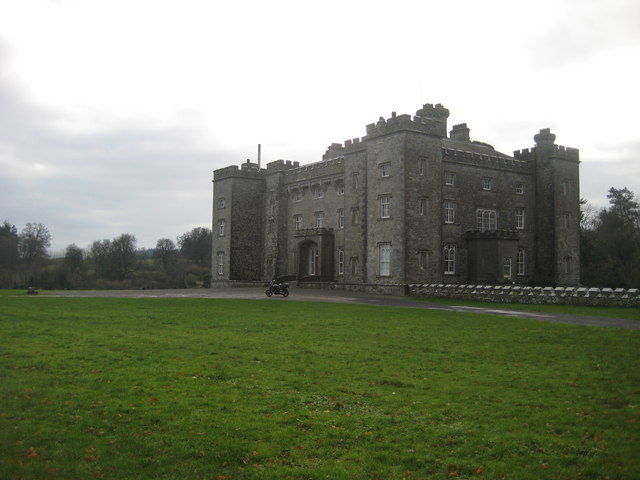
Slane Castle.

Slane Castle stands on the river about 1 kilometre (0.6 mi) upstream from the centre of the village. There is an ancient well in the grounds of the castle near the river. In Irish mythology (specifically the account found in the Cath Maigh Tuireadh), the well was blessed by Dian Cecht so that the Tuatha Dé Danann could bathe in it and be healed, allegedly, healing all wounds but decapitation. However upon the arrival of Christianity in Ireland, and the policy of Christian reinterpretation for pagan sites, the well is now known as Our lady's well. Legion of Mary–led pilgrimages to the site are hosted every August.

The castle grounds have been the site of large rock concerts since 1981.

Also within the grounds of Slane Castle (demesne) are the ruins of St. Erc's Hermitage. This consists of a late 15 to 16th century chapel, an earlier dwelling, a stone arched footbridge over a stream/tributary that feeds into the Boyne and the stone quarry face from where the materials for construction were taken. Local folklore has it that during the 19th-century move of the apostle's stone, a stone carving of the crucifixion of Christ, which was taken from this chapel to be placed in the modern church in the village, the 200 kg stone carving was to mysteriously find its way back to the Hermitage in the still dead of night. A portion of a celtic cross carving, that was also initially part of St. Erc's Hermitage is now housed in an Iron frame beside the altar within Saint Patrick's Church on Chapel street. A catholic church was built c.1805. Not to be confused with the similarly named Saint Patrick's Church of Ireland, on main street, built 1797 "M.DCC.XCVII."

In 2009 "Slane Castle Whiskey", began to be bottled and labelled, a blended whiskey, it was created by Noel Sweeney and made at the Cooley mountain distillery outside Dundalk.

Following a change in ownership, the Cooley distillery ceased further collaboration. Resulting in the financing and construction by Brown Forman of "Slane Castle Distillery", completed in 2017, it is owned and operated by Henry and Alex Conyngham. The whiskey that is intended to be produced in the distillery, carries the label, "SLANE Irish Whiskey", with the placename of "Slane", since 2018, now a registered trademark, controversially held by the owner of "Slane Castle Irish Whiskey Limited".

=== Slane Mill ===
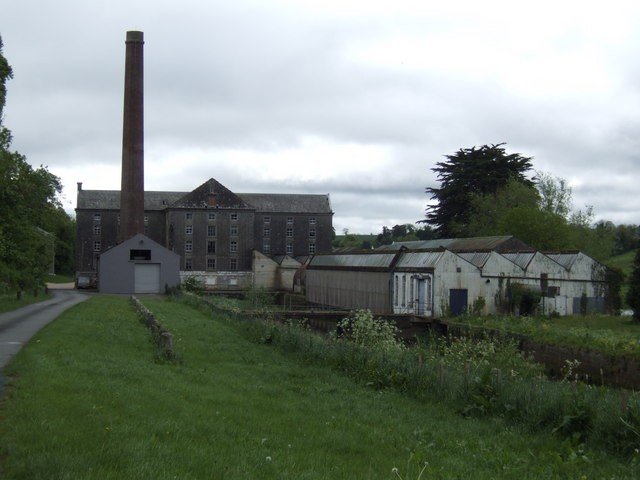
The "Old mill" resides next to 20th-century adjacent factory buildings that were built before the rate of the textile industry at the site, outgrew the capacity of the area. It is referred to as the "old mill" to distinguish it from the "new mill" or "factory" that was built slightly uphill from this site, due to the area's land constraints. The main mill building "displays a level of carved detail that is unusual for an industrial building and more typically found in country houses of the period".

In the 1760s Boyne Navigation opened between Slane and Oldbridge, approximately 10 kilometres (6.2 mi) down river. This is a series of canals which made the River Boyne navigable to small boats from Slane to the port in Drogheda. A canal which is part of the navigation runs parallel to the river on the south bank near Slane. David Jebb was the engineer in charge of the construction. Once the navigation was opened as far as Slane, Jebb himself built a flour mill at Slane. Slane Mill stands on the north bank of the River Boyne beside the N2 bridge. The mill is a five-storey cut-stone building. When the mill was completed in 1766, it was the largest flour mill in Ireland.

By channelling the water of the Boyne through the weir that passes under the five-storey building, the water-powered mill in the building ground flour until the 1870s, at which point roller mills replaced grindstones. The mill building was later converted to processing Irish scutch flax for clothing.

With competition in the textile industry, the mill began to transition from primary sector to more secondary finished goods, and to that end, the workforce largely moved to the "new mill" in the early-mid-20th century, which could house the longer lines of power looms. A concrete walkway cutting through the forest that separates the two mills was similarly built to allow a quicker exchange of personnel. The now increasingly idle water-powered mill in what became the "old mill", was converted into a dedicated low head hydro power run-of-the-river hydroelectricity generating station. Its operators received a cheque from the ESB for a number of decades until it fell into disrepair.

By the late 20th century, both mills, like others in the textile industry of western Europe, faced repeated downsizing. This was in part due to a failure to innovate a desirable and unique design signature, competition from businesses with greater supply-chain vertical integration, the need to upgrade to more modern air-jet looms, and cheaper labour in the far East. Therefore, the "new mill" has all but left the textile industry that was once the primary employer in Slane.

=== Slane Bridge ===
The hill and dangerous bend approaching Slane bridge.

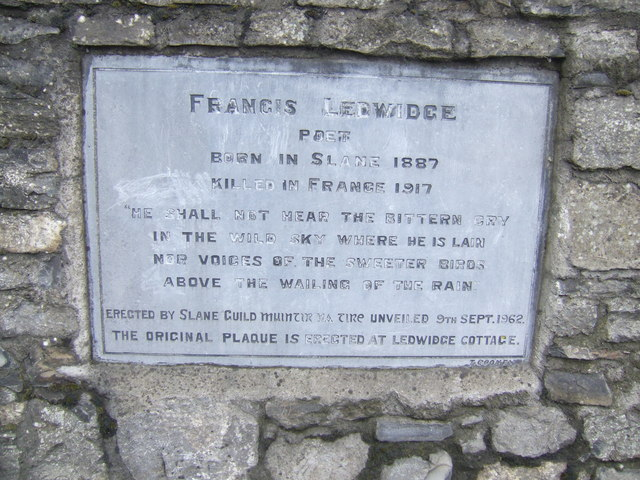
Memorial plaque on Slane bridge commemorating poet, Irish and National Volunteers member, Francis Ledwidge, who was to serve and die in World War I.

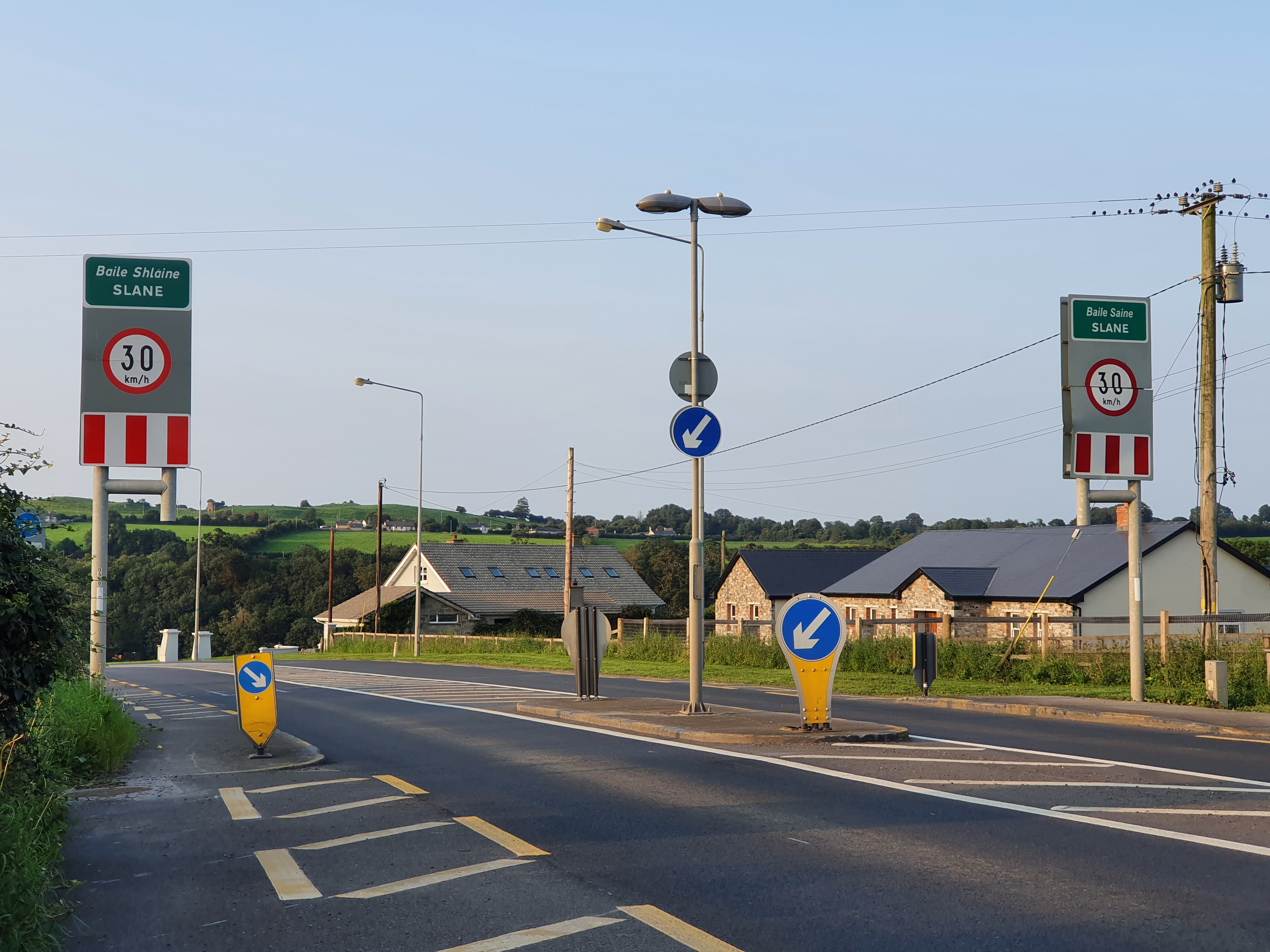
Road signposts on the N2 as northbound traffic enters Slane from Ashbourne. A 30 km/h speed limit has been adopted in Slane since 2009 in an effort to prevent further collisions. The signs are located nearly a kilometre from the notorious black spot.

The N2 crosses the River Boyne south of the village. The road descends a steep hill from the village and makes an almost ninety-degree turn onto the 14th-century bridge. This bend was the scene of at least 22 fatalities in the late 20th century. As you climb the hill towards Slane village the wall on the right-hand side of the road has a number of small white crosses, each representing a death on this stretch of road. Most of the crashes have involved heavy goods vehicles which are not able to slow down sufficiently to make the sharp bend after picking up speed on the hill. Meath County Council and the National Roads Authority have installed a number of traffic calming measures over the years in an attempt to make the bend onto the bridge safer. These include separate traffic signals for heavy goods vehicles and cars, as well as a 30km/h speed limit throughout the village. Since their installation, fatal accidents have ceased. It was hoped that the opening of the M1 motorway would divert a lot of the heavy traffic from the village but there is evidence that many heavy goods vehicles still use the N2 (and thus Slane bridge) to avoid paying the toll on the M1 bridge. Planning permission for a 3.5 km bypass of Slane was refused by An Bord Pleanála in 2012, due to heritage concerns regarding the nearby Newgrange monument. An Bord Pleanála said that due to the proposed road being in the "viewshed" of the Newgrange UNESCO site, approval would only be considered if no alternative route was possible.

The bridge has not always been the source of tragedy, the evening of 18 May 1969 is fondly remembered by many of the community when a truck laden with Bushmills and Cream of Barley Whiskey was travelling from County Antrim to Dublin when its brakes failed coming down the hill and it rolled over the bridge wall into the river some 3 meters or so below, the driver survived and was brought to Hospital but the entire loot of liquor was strewn across the river bottom. Most of the town of Slane were quick on the scene, vans and truck were seen spiriting away from the wreck of the truck in the dead of night. Several prosecutions followed, but the actual quantity of whiskey taken away is still known only to the management of Bushmills and perhaps to the Insurance Company that followed up the claim. The following day five Irish Divers, Brian Cusack, Sean Sheridan, Joe Murray, Fergus McKenna and Sean Donohoe arrived and while the local people of Slane were still dredging for bottles they collected 408 bottles in total, the local butcher in Slane at the time was apparently still drinking Bushmills Whiskey four years later.

== Near Slane ==
There are many other historical sites in the area around Slane. The Brú na Bóinne complex of Neolithic chamber tombs lies on the River Boyne, 5 kilometres (3 mi) downstream from the village. This includes Newgrange, a passage tomb built c. 3200 BC.

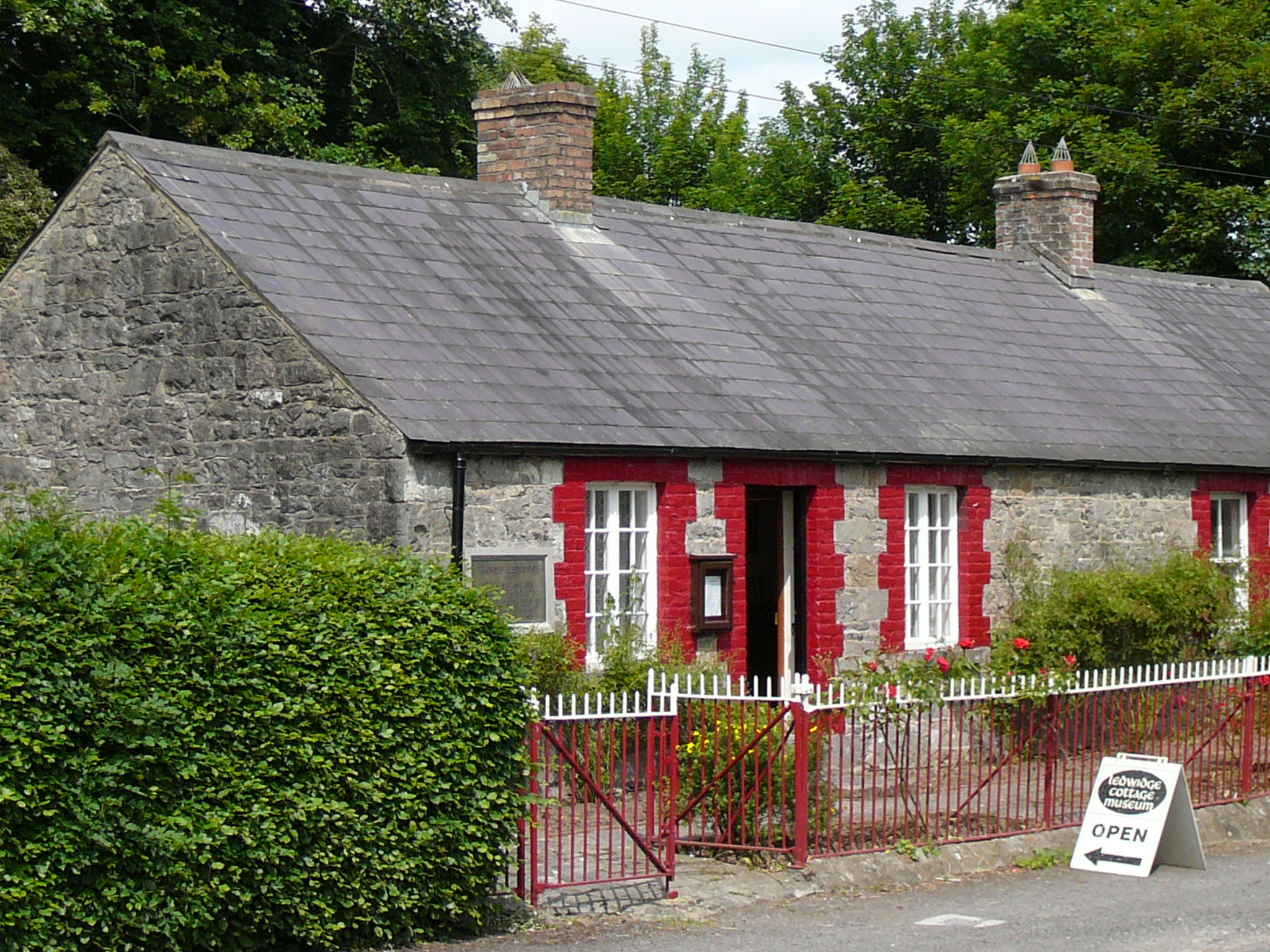
Ledwidge Cottage Museum, Slane, County Meath where Francis Ledwidge lived and grew up as a young poet.

Across the river from the old mill stand the ruins of Fennor Castle/Tower House, adjacent to Fennor Church and its graveyard.

The ruins of Castle Dexter which was built circa the 12th century, lay approximately 2 kilometres (1.3 miles) west of Slane Castle and it is likewise sited near the banks of the River Boyne. 18th-century drawings and watercolours of how this castle appeared are held in the National Library of Ireland.

In common with the town of Drogheda and the area around the adjacent limestone quarry of Platin, a number of now overgrown lime kilns dot the hills of Slane, with the most visible being behind the only service station remaining in the village and to the rear of Ledwidge Cottage.

Rosnaree Mill and its accompanying Sheela na Gig, a stone carving which has been taken indoors to prevent further weathering, can be viewed upon request to the owner at George's Patisseries on Chapel Street, Slane.

The site of the Battle of the Boyne is 10 kilometres (6.2 mi) downriver, east, from Slane.

== Transport ==
Bus Éireann route 190 links Slane to Drogheda, Navan, Trim, Mullingar and Athlone. There is a bus in each direction every hour to/from Navan, Trim and Drogheda and every two hours to Athlone. The bus to Duleek was withdrawn in November 2013. Collins Coaches operate a route linking Slane to Dublin, Collon, Ardee and Carrickmacross with one journey each way to/from Ballybay. McConnons also serve Slane with a few services a day. The Sunday only Bus Éireann route 177 providing a single journey each way via Slane on the Monaghan to Dublin route was withdrawn in November 2013.

== Slane local electoral area ==
Slane is also the name of a local electoral area encompassing a large area of eastern County Meath from Lobinstown to the Irish Sea. This area includes other towns larger but not older than Slane in the modern day, such as Duleek, Stamullen and the portions of the environs of Drogheda which are in County Meath. The population of Slane Local Electoral Area was 32,126 in 2006.

== "Slane" trademark controversy ==
An application by "Slane Castle Whiskey" to both the EU Intellectual Property Office and the US Patent and Trade Mark Office, to trademark the placename of "Slane" was filed in 2015. This trademarking became known after a business in the village, which had desired to use "Slane" in its title, discovered it was blocked from doing so. The controversy, around the trademarking includes that this application was designed to cast a very wide net, over a range of goods and services, not limited to alcohol, resulting in the trademark-holders controlling an array of other categories. In the EU jurisdiction, the attempt had been granted, without the prerequisite of a simple web-search being conducted on the name, raising issues of corruption and reassessment being required, as an earlier EU-trademark-ruling exists, that explicitly prohibits businesses from trademarking the name of historical places.

In the still ongoing US case, the attempt to trademark "Slane" was refused in 2015 on the grounds that, upon doing a web-search, the word is both the name of a place and there are other local businesses with a long-standing use of "Slane" as part of their name.

== Notable people ==
- John Cassidy (1860–1939), painter and sculptor
- Dean Cogan (1826–1872) Catholic historian, author of The Diocese of Meath.
- John Connolly (1750–1825), second Bishop of the Roman Catholic Diocese of New York
- Francis Ledwidge (1887–1917), poet killed in action during World War I.
- Denis Nulty (1963-), current Catholic Bishop of Kildare and Leighlin
- John Boyle O'Reilly (1844–1890), poet, publisher, and member of the Irish Republican Brotherhood

== See also ==
- List of towns and villages in Ireland
- List of abbeys and priories in the Republic of Ireland, (County Meath)
