= David Jebb =

David Jebb (c. 1738 – 6 August 1826) was an English surveyor and engineer who was Surveyor-General in Ulster. in charge of the construction of the Boyne Navigation, a series of canals running 31 km (19 mi) roughly parallel to the River Boyne from Oldbridge to Navan in County Meath, Ireland. Jebb himself built a flour mill at Slane in 1766 to take advantage of the navigation that he had recently completed that far.

Jebb was born into a prominent family, the son of Rev. John Jebb. His brothers were Dr. John Jebb and Sir Richard Jebb, 1st Baronet. He built Egham Park in Surrey.

He died at Sansome Lodge in Worcester.
