= Boyne Navigation =

Irish canal network

Boyne Navigation Loingseoireacht na Bóinne

Specifications
- Length: 31 km (19 miles)
- Locks: 19 (originally 20)
- Status: Being restored by IWAI - Boyne Navigation (voluntary)

History
- Principal engineer: David Jebb
- Construction began: 1748
- Date closed: 1920s

Geography
- Start point: Oldbridge, Meath (close to Drogheda)
- End point: Navan
- Connects to: River Boyne

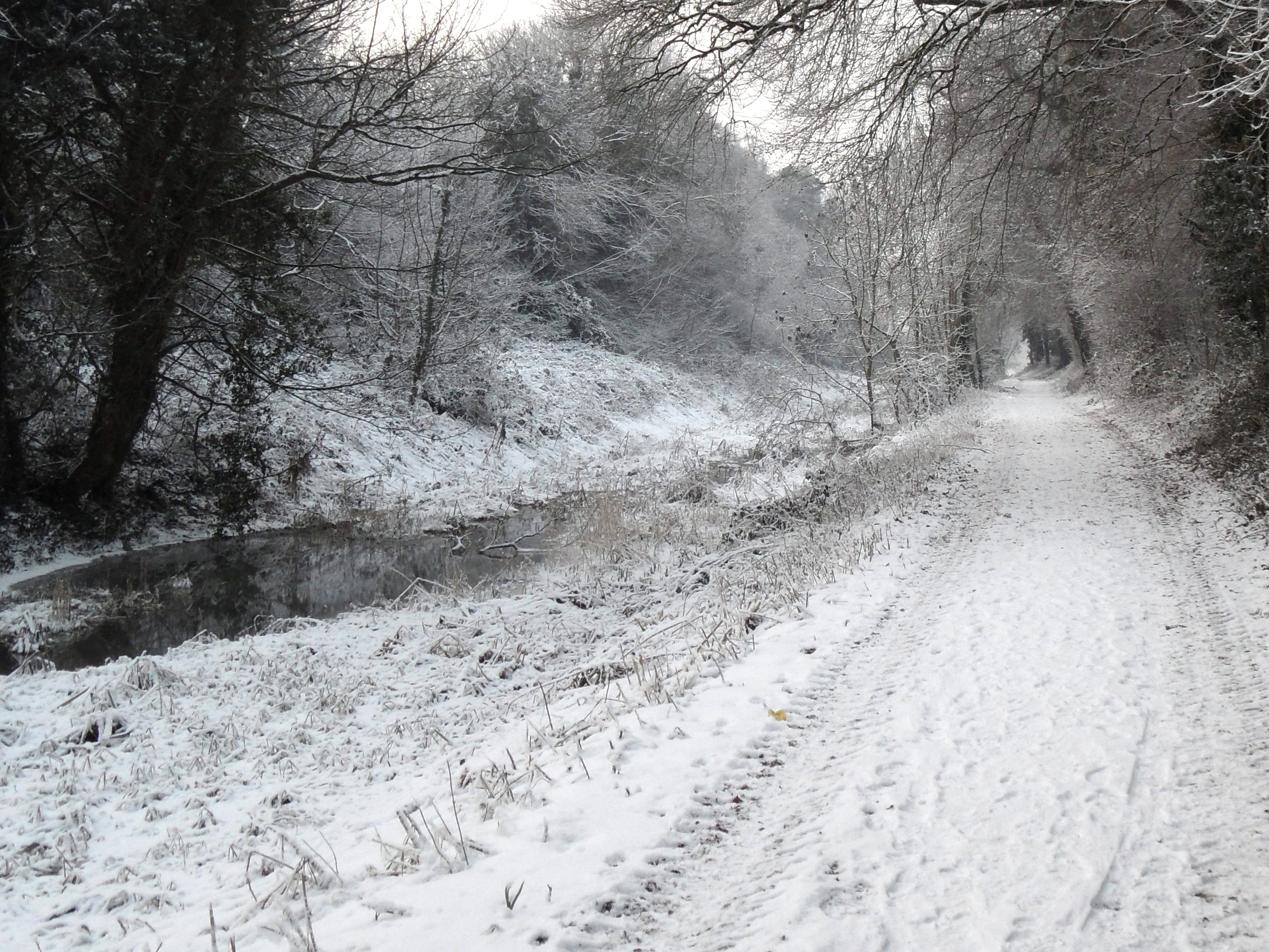
The Boyne Navigation about 3km from Navan, Co. Meath

The Boyne Navigation (Irish: Loingseoireacht na Bóinne) is a series of canals running 31 km (19 mi) roughly parallel to the River Boyne from Oldbridge to Navan in County Meath, in Ireland. The navigation was once used by horse-drawn boats travelling between Navan, Slane and the port of Drogheda; however is now derelict. The Boyne Navigation branch of the Inland Waterways Association of Ireland have an agreement with An Taisce – The National Trust for Ireland giving it a license to carry out restoration work on the navigation to return it to a usable waterway.

== History ==
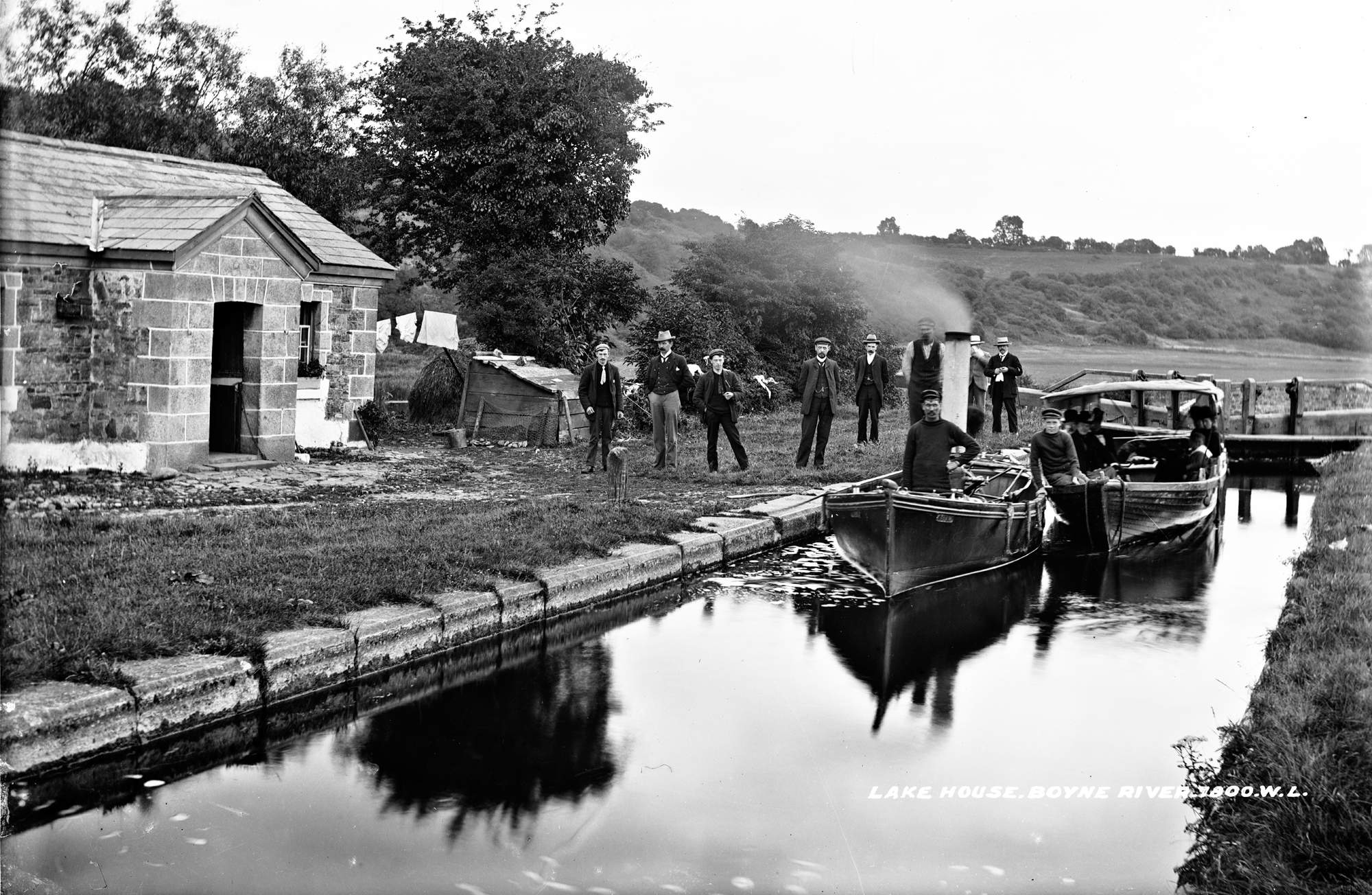
Pleasure craft close to Rossnaree and Newgrange (ca 1890s)

The Boyne Navigation comprises two sections; the Lower Navigation from Drogheda, near mouth of the Boyne, to Slane and the Upper Navigation is from Slane to Navan. The navigation channel is partly the river itself and partly stretches of canal, mostly on the south side of the river. The route uses the river exclusively below Oldbridge while the Upper Navigation is mostly canal.

The designers intended that the navigation continue upstream along the Boyne to Trim where it could connect with the Royal Canal. The section from Navan to Trim was never built, and the Boyne Navigation remains disconnected from other inland waterways in Ireland. The Boyne Navigation Company began work on the lower section of the navigation from the sea lock at Oldbridge to Slane in 1748 and was completed in the 1760s. The upper section from Slane to Navan was completed in 1800. The main cargo on the navigation was grain and flour between the mills on the river and the port of Drogheda and coal in the other direction. At four places along the route the towpath switches from one side of the river to the other. Where this happened the horse would step onto the barge while it was poled across to the other side.

David Jebb was the engineer in charge of the construction. Jebb himself built a flour mill at Slane in 1766 to take advantage of the navigation that he had recently completed that far. When opened it was the largest mill of its kind in Ireland.

A traditional craft used by people on the Boyne was the Boyne cóireáil (circular currachs). A group called the Boyne Currach Heritage Group was founded in 1997 to build replicas of the original currachs.

== Economics ==
The navigation was never a commercial success, however it did expand the local economy by making it easier to transport agricultural goods from inland County Meath to market. The total cost to build the navigation was £190,000 (in pounds sterling) of which £30,000 was private contributions the remainder being public funds. In the financial year ending in April 1844 income for the navigation was £734.12s.4d. and expenses were £460.6s.9d (both in pounds, shillings and pence).

== Navigation ==
Boats with a draught of 1.4 m (4 ft 8 in) in the winter and 1.1 m (3 ft 6 in) in the summer could travel the navigation. Low water in the summer and during low tides meant that the Boyne Navigation was not always navigable. The journey from Drogheda to Slane took 7 hours in summer and 6 hours in the winter. Slane to Navan took 4 hours in the summer and 9 hours in the winter. In 1847 the toll to travel the lower section was 1¼ d. per ton per mile and 2 d. per ton per mile on the upper section. Boat owners would charge 3 s. per ton to carry freight from Drogheda to Slane and 4 s. 6 d. per ton from Drogheda to Navan.

The locks on the Boyne Navigation include:

Oldbridge section:

- Lock 1: Oldbridge Sealock/ Tiernan's Lock
- Lock 2: Oldbridge Guard/ Turf Lock

Staleen section:

- Lock 3: Staleen Lower Lock
- Lock 4: Staleen Guard Lock

Broe section:

- Lock 5: Broe Lock
- Lock 6: Broe Guard Lock

Slane section:

- Lock 7: Morgan's/ Rosnaree Lock
- Lock 8: Slane Guard Lock
- Lock 9: Slane Castle Lock
- Lock 10: Carrickdexter Lock
- Lock 11: Cruicetown Lock
- Lock 12: Castlefin Lock
- Lock 13: Deer Park Lock
- Lock 14: Stackallen Guard Lock

Navan section:

- Lock 15: Stackallen Lock
- Lock 16: Taffe's Lock
- Lock 17: Rowley's Lock
- Lock 18: Ruxton's Lock
- Lock 19: Metge's Lock (removed, lock and harbour filled in, turned into Andy Brennan's Park now).

== Current status ==
The canal passed into private ownership in 1915 and over the next ten years fell into disrepair. An Taisce purchased the navigation rights to the canal from the Navan baker John Spicer & Co. for one Irish pound in 1969. An Taisce also own most of the towpaths and adjoining lands however there is no public access on a section of the Lower Navigation from Rosnaree Lock to Roughgrange. A number of sections of the towpath are maintained as walking paths, particularly the section from Stackallan Bridge to Navan. Metges Lock [Navan] and weir were removed in the 1980 by the OPW as part of a flood relief scheme. Voluntary restoration efforts have mostly been concentrated on the first section of navigation, from the Sealock (Lock 1) to the Guardlock (Lock 2) at Oldbridge (Oldbridge section). The Oldbridge section has reinstated Lockgates. Lockgates for Lock 1 were hand built on the towpath/ grass verge to this lock, of the course of about 4 years. Lockgates for Lock 2 were contracted out to a local joiner (Michael Black, Drogheda). They were installed over he course of a week during May 2017. A silt harbour was also reinstated above Lock 2. Lock 3 was dredged during Summer 2018. Lockgates were fabricated between the end of 2018 and early 2019. Basic gates were installed at it back in May 2019. The Boyne Navigation section of the Inland Waterways Association of Ireland (IWAI) spent the rest of 2019 and early 2020 fitting additional parts to these lockgates to make them functional. Work has been suspended due to the covid-19 illness.

A subgroup of the Boyne Navigation section of IWAI has been established back in roughly 2018. They work on the Navan section of the Boyne Navigation. The carry out work days ever Monday except bank holidays. Their work can be followed on. They have been involved in maintaining the grounds of Lock 17, clearance of fallen trees, maintenance of growth along the Navan section.

Other work that has taken place in the recently past: the area above the Guardlock has been dredged, considerable clearance of towpath below Staleen Lower lock (Lock 3), Restoration of stone wall bank which borders the canal above Staleen Lower Lock (Lock 3), clearance of the navigation between Athlumney and Ruxton's Lock (Lock 17).

The Oldbridge section is now managed for navigation. The gates at Lock 2 are closed during the Winter (river flooding periods of the year) and can opened during the summer (times of low River Boyne levels). Small boats can effectively travel from Drogheda up as far as Staleen Lock (lock 3). When complete, this will allow passage of boats from Drogheda as far upstream as Staleen Lock. The Staleen section actually passes Newgrange.

The announcement of a public mooring at Scotch Hall shopping centre in Drogheda will complement the Boyne Navigation. A grant has been awarded for the construction for the public moorings, as per announcement on local Councillor's (Frank Godfrey's) Facebook page. The mooring is not due to go ahead as funding was around €100,000 but the cheapest quote was around €400,000.

Official restoration agents carrying out the voluntary restoration of the Boyne Navigation are the Boyne Navigation section of IWAI. They have agreed to carry such work with the property owner An Taisce on sections it owner and other property which the Boyne Navigation runs through. They have recently been carrying out the workdays on both ends (Drogheda and Navan) of waterway.

A local community employment group working under IWAI's Boyne Navigation Branch is currently undertaking works on the Slane section of the navigation. Recent works which have taken place include: removal of thick vegetation growth on the waterway section (during Summer 2014) between Slane Lock (Lock 9) to a little beyond the Bridge that crosses the Boyne Navigation and River Boyne leading to Slane. Sluices were installed in the concrete barriers at Locks 8 and 9 at this section to allow for the rewatering of the waterway section and also allow for the regulation water levels. Once or were funding sourced, it would be hoped for the installation of lockgates at Lock 8 (Morgan's Lock) and Lock 9 (Slane Weir) allowing boat passage from the River Boyne to the other using the Boyne Navigation. A boat would do this by entering the double lock chamber at Lock 8 under the engineering feat of the man-made archway (locally known as the Scabby Arch) under the stone arch road bridge to Slane up to Lock 9 and back out onto the River Boyne.

A local group have established a workgroup to maintain and upkeep the Staleen Guard Lock walkway/ towpath section, between the River Boyne and back down to the Drogheda Waterworks.

Public consultation was held in 2021 for the Boyne Greenway — a project to create a greenway alongside restoring the canal. As of 2025 the route had yet to be finalised.

== Boat trips ==
After the commercial feasibility of using the waterway for ferrying trade goods was made redundant with the advent of the train. The Boyne Navigation attracted tourists and tour boats to run trips on its waters. At least two tour boats were known to have operated on the navigation one by the name of Ros na Righ. One of these boats' journeys functioned by having a leading boat with an end, which dragged a boat behind it with its paying travellers.

In the 21st century, tour boat activity has been reestablished on the Oldbridge section. One company offering trips is called Boyne Boats. They have been operating for about the last two years. Tourists are offered a trip through the history of the Boyne Valley, while paddling a traditional Irish boat (currach) called a naomhóg along the Boyne Navigation - Oldbridge section. This company has offered boat trips above Lock 2 and Lock 8 on the River Boyne, opposite Slane Castle.

== Boyne Greenway ==
A cycle track and walkway, known as the Boyne Greenway or Boyneside Trail, has been developed along the Oldbridge section of the navigation. It runs from Dominic's Park in Drogheda to near the entrance to the Battle of the Boyne Visitor Centre in Oldbridge.

== Walking routes ==
Walkways in the area include routes from:

- Battle of the Boyne Centre to under Brú na Bóinne Centre walkway
- Lock from Slane town to Rossnaree/ Morgan's Lock
- Slane Ramparts to Slane Castle
- Navan to Stackallen (Broadboyne) Bridge

== Bibliography ==
- Cumberlidge, Jane (2002). The Inland Waterways of Ireland. Imray Laurie Norie and Wilson. ISBN 978-0-85288-424-9.
- Delany, Ruth (2004). Ireland's Inland Waterways. Appletree Press. ISBN 978-0-86281-824-1.
- Holden, Anthony (2017). The River Boyne. Anthony Holden.
- Ellison, Chris (1983). Water of the Boyne and Blackwater: A scenic and Industrial Miscellany. Blackwater Press. ISBN 978-0-9054-7114-3.
- Antonelli, Lenny (2015). East of Ireland Walks: On River and Canal. Blackwater Press. ISBN 978-1-8488-9546-1.

== See also ==
- Canals of Ireland
- River Boyne, article about the river
- Anthony Holten, author of The River Boyne: Hidden Legacies, History and Lore Explored on Foot and by Boat (ISBN 9780956991119)
