= Boyne Greenway =

Walkway in Ireland

- Length: 4.5 km (2.8 mi)
- Location: County Meath, Ireland
- Trailheads: Dominic's Park (Drogheda, County Louth), opposite entrance to Battle of the Boyne Visitor Centre (Oldbridge, County Meath)
- Use: Cycling and walking
- Surface: Plastic replica wood

The Boyne Greenway or Boyneside Trail is a greenway, cycle track and walkway along the Oldbridge section of the Boyne Navigation in Ireland. It runs from Dominic's Park in Drogheda, County Louth to near the entrance to the Battle of the Boyne Visitor Centre in Oldbridge, County Meath.

A seven-kilometre continuation of the route, from Ship Street in Drogheda to Mornington, County Meath, along the Boyne Estuary, was under consideration as of 2020. The plan was reportedly rejected in September 2023, due to the potential impact on Special Areas of Conservation the route would run near. Concerns about the project had been raised by BirdWatch Ireland, who feared the impact that a greenway would have on migrating birds in the Boyne Estuary SPA (Special Protection Area).

A 26.5 kilometre extension towards Navan was also proposed. In February 2021, Meath County Council launched a public consultation on the potential route. The extension is proposed to run from Andy Brennan Park in Navan to the gates of the Oldbridge Estate. In December 2023, a public consultation was launched on the emerging preferred route. The delay between the first consultation and the publishing of the preferred route was attributed to changes in the approval process for greenways in Ireland, and a need to carry out a flood modelling exercise.
