= Rossnaree =

Village in County Meath, Ireland

Rosnaree Ros na Rí
- Village
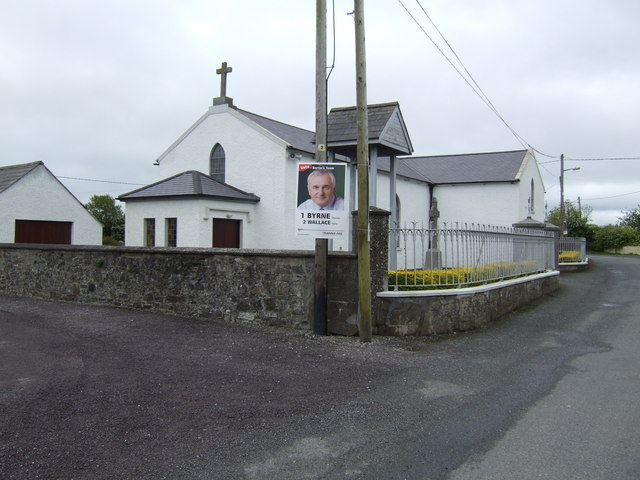
- Church of the Nativity Rossnaree, built c.1820

- Location within Ireland
- Coordinates: 53°41′18″N 6°29′55″W
- Country: Ireland
- Province: Leinster
- County: County Meath

Area
  - Townland: 2.8 km^{2} (1.1 sq mi)

Rossnaree or Rosnaree (Irish: Ros na Rí, meaning 'wood of the kings'; Old Irish Ros na Ríg or Ros na Ríogh) is a small village and townland in County Meath, Ireland, 10 km west of Drogheda. The village is on the south bank of the River Boyne, and the Brú na Bóinne complex of Neolithic monuments is nearby, on the north bank of the Boyne. Rossnaree commands a ford that was used by the Williamites at the Battle of the Boyne in 1690. The walls of the mill at Rossnaree once contained a Sheela na Gig, although this has been removed for safekeeping and is in private possession.

== Legends ==
The legendary High King of Ireland Cormac mac Airt is reputedly buried at Rossnaree, having refused to be buried at a pagan site across the river after converting to Christianity. In the Ulster Cycle tale Cath Ruis na Ríg ("the Battle of Rosnaree"), it is the site of a battle between Conchobar mac Nessa, king of the Ulaid, and his son-in-law Cairpre Nia Fer, king of Tara, during which the Ulaid hero Cú Chulainn kills Cairpre with a spear thrown from a distance, and then decapitates him before his body hits the ground.

== Namesakes ==
Rossnaree House, a mid-19th century manor house, takes its name from the area in which it is sited. It is suggested by Elizabeth Hickey to be the original location of the House of Cletty (Tech Cleitech), where Cormac mac Airt died after choking on a salmon bone and Muirchertach Macc Ercae reputedly died a threefold death.

Ros na Righ was also the name of a small steam launch which brought day-trippers along the Boyne Navigation in the early 1900s.

The Rosnaree Hotel outside Drogheda was the location of an IPLO-INLA shooting incident in 1987. It is now the Moorehall Lodge nursing home.
