= Battle of the Boyne =

1690 battle of the Williamite War in Ireland

- Part of the Williamite War in Ireland and the Nine Years' War
- Painting of the battle by Jan van Huchtenburg
| Date | 1 July 1690 O.S. (Note: The battle took place on 11 July N.S.(England changed in 1752), but the anniversary is now celebrated on 12 July. This is explained at § Commemoration below.) |
| Location | Oldbridge, County Meath, Kingdom of Ireland 53°43′23″N 06°25′25″W |
| Result | Williamite victory |

Belligerents
| Williamites; Dutch Republic | Jacobites; France |

Commanders and leaders
| William III; Duke of Schomberg †; Godert de Ginkel (Dutch Republic) Count of Solms (Dutch Republic) Duke of Wurttemberg | James II; Earl of Tyrconnell; Antoine Caumont; Duke of Berwick |

Strength
| 36,000 | 23,500 |

Casualties and losses
| 500 killed or wounded | 1,500 killed or wounded |
- Location within Ireland

The Battle of the Boyne (Irish: Cath na Bóinne IPA: [ˈkah n̪ˠə ˈbˠoːn̠ʲə]) took place in 1690 between the forces of the deposed King James II, and those of King William III who, with his wife Queen Mary II (his cousin and James's daughter), had acceded to the Crowns of England, Scotland and Ireland (Note: The "Patriot Parliament" session of the Parliament of Ireland confirmed Charles as King of Ireland, though Poynings' Law arguably made this invalid. In any case, the subsequent Act of Recognition set this aside.) in 1689. The battle was fought across the River Boyne close to the town of Drogheda in the Kingdom of Ireland, modern-day Ireland, and resulted in a victory for William. This turned the tide in James's failed attempt to regain the Crowns of England, Scotland and Ireland and ultimately aided in ensuring the continued Protestant ascendancy in Ireland.

The battle took place on 1 July 1690 O.S. William's forces defeated James's army, which consisted mostly of raw recruits. Although the Williamite War in Ireland continued until the signing of the Treaty of Limerick in October 1691, James fled to France after the Boyne, never to return.

== Background ==
The battle was a major encounter in James's attempt to regain the thrones of England and Scotland, resulting from the Invitation to William and William's wife, Mary, from the 'immortal seven' English peers to take the throne to defend Protestantism. But the conflict had broader and deeper European geopolitical roots, of the League of Augsburg and the Grand Alliance against the expansionist ambitions of Catholic Louis XIV of France, or of the House of Bourbon against the House of Habsburg. If the battle is seen as part of the War of the Grand Alliance, Pope Alexander VIII was an ally of William and a friend to James; the Papal States were part of the Grand Alliance with a shared hostility to the Catholic Louis XIV of France, who at the time was attempting to establish dominance in Europe and to whom James was an ally.

The previous year William had sent the Duke of Schomberg to take charge of the Irish campaign. He was a 74-year-old professional soldier who had accompanied William during the Glorious Revolution. He brought an army of 20,000 men, which arrived at Bangor. Under his command, affairs had remained static and very little had been accomplished, partly because the English troops suffered severely from fever and the army's move south was blocked by Jacobite forces; both sides camped for the winter.

In an Irish context, the war was a sectarian and ethnic conflict, in many ways a re-run of the Irish Confederate Wars of 50 years earlier. For the Jacobites, the war was fought for Irish sovereignty, religious tolerance for Catholicism, and land ownership. The Catholic upper classes had lost or had been forced to exchange almost all their lands after Cromwell's conquest, as well as the right to hold public office, practice their religion, and sit in the Irish Parliament. To these ends, under Richard Talbot, 1st Earl of Tyrconnel, they had raised an army to restore James II after the Glorious Revolution. Sir James Fitz Edmond Cotter being the commander-in-chief of all King James's forces in the counties of Cork, Kerry, Limerick, and Tipperary. By 1690, they controlled all of Ireland except for Derry and Enniskillen. The majority of Irish people were Jacobites and supported James II due to his 1687 Declaration of Indulgence or, as it is also known, the Declaration for the Liberty of Conscience, that granted religious freedom to all denominations in England and Scotland and also due to James II's promise to the Irish Parliament of an eventual right to self-determination.

Conversely, for the Williamites in Ireland, the war was about maintaining Protestant rule in Ireland. They feared for their lives and their property if James and his Catholic supporters were to rule Ireland, nor did they trust the promise of tolerance, seeing the Declaration of Indulgence as a ploy to re-establish Catholicism as the sole state religion. James had already antagonised English Protestants with his actions. In particular, they dreaded a repeat of the Irish Rebellion of 1641, which had been marked by widespread killing. For these reasons, Protestants fought en masse for William of Orange. Many Williamite troops at the Boyne, including their very effective irregular cavalry, were Ulster Protestants, who called themselves "Enniskilliners" and were referred to by contemporaries as "Scots-Irish". These "Enniskilliners" were mostly the descendants of Anglo-Scottish border reivers; large numbers of these reivers had settled around Enniskillen in County Fermanagh.

=== Commanders ===
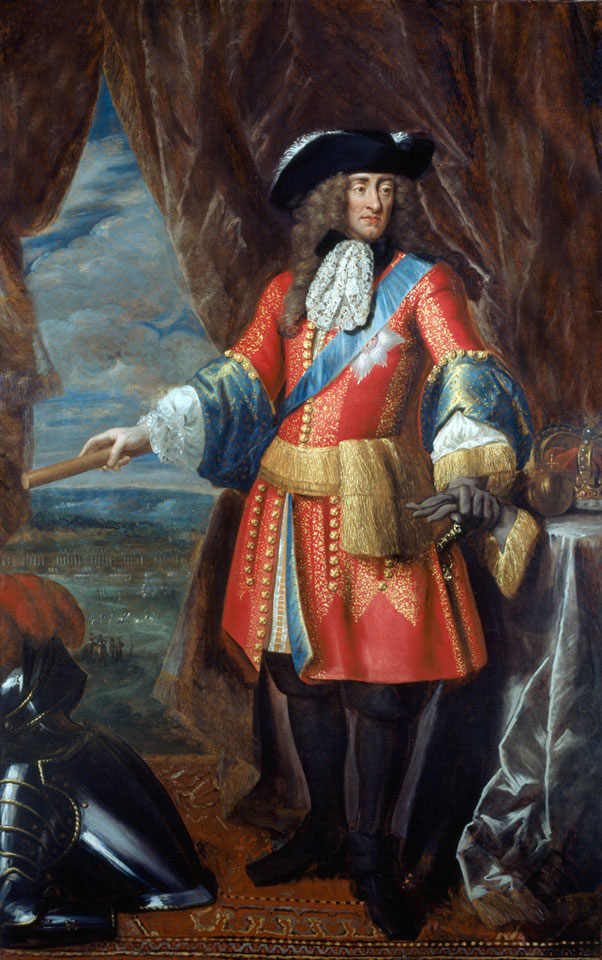
James II, King of England and Ireland, James VII of Scotland, 1685–1688, portrayed as head of the army c. 1685)

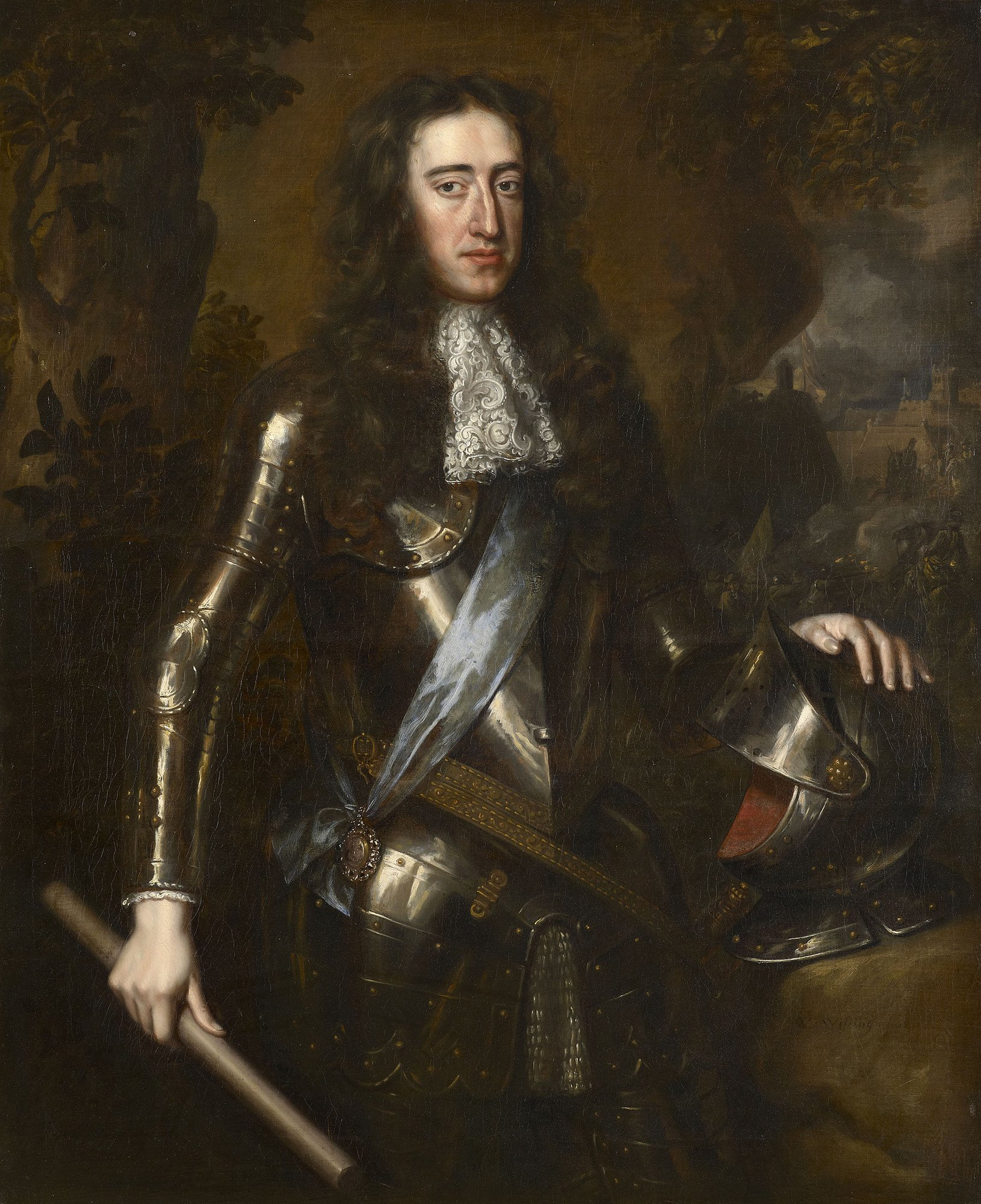
William III ("William of Orange"), King of England, Scotland and Ireland, 1689–1702, Stadtholder in the Netherlands, 1672–1702

The opposing armies in the battle were led by the Roman Catholic king James II of England and Ireland (VII of Scotland) and, opposing him, his nephew and son-in-law, the Protestant king William III ("William of Orange") who had deposed James the previous year. James's supporters controlled much of Ireland and the Irish Parliament. James also enjoyed the support of his cousin, Louis XIV, who did not want to see a hostile monarch on the throne of England. Louis sent 6,000 French troops to Ireland to support the Irish Jacobites. William was already Stadtholder of the Netherlands and was able to call on Dutch and allied troops from Europe as well as England and Scotland.

James was a seasoned officer who had proved his bravery when fighting in Europe, notably at the Battle of the Dunes. However, recent historians have suggested that he was prone to panicking under pressure and making rash decisions, which it has been suggested may have been due to poor health associated with the Stuart line.

William, although a seasoned commander, had yet to win a major battle. William's success against the French had been reliant upon tactical manoeuvres and good diplomacy rather than force. His diplomacy had assembled the League of Augsburg, a multi-national coalition formed to resist French aggression in Europe. From William's point of view, his taking power in England and the ensuing campaign in Ireland was just another front in the war against France in general, and Louis XIV in particular.

James II's subordinate commanders were Richard Talbot, 1st Earl of Tyrconnell, who was Lord Deputy of Ireland and James's most powerful supporter in Ireland; Sir James Fitz Edmond Cotter, Brigadier General in command of all the Jacobite forces in counties Cork, Kerry, Limerick and Tipperary, and an intimate of James II; and the French general Lauzun. William's commander-in-chief was the Duke of Schomberg. Born in Heidelberg, Germany, Schomberg had fought for a few different countries and had formerly been a Marshal of France, but, being a Huguenot, was compelled to leave France in 1685 because of the revocation of the Edict of Nantes.

=== Armies ===
The Williamite army at the Boyne was about 36,000 strong, composed of troops from many countries; Only around half of them were British. Around 20,000 troops had been in Ireland since 1689, commanded by Schomberg. William himself had landed in Carrickfergus on 14 June O.S. He met Schomberg at nearby Whitehouse, and then proceeded south through Belfast. Loughbrickland was the rallying point of the scattered divisions of the army. He arrived there with another 16,000 in June 1690. On 30 June O.S. William had reached the top of a hill near the southern border of County Louth.

William's troops were generally far better trained and equipped than James's. The best Williamite infantry were from Denmark (7000) and the Netherlands (6000), professional soldiers equipped with the latest flintlock muskets. The Danish infantry was commanded by General Ernst von Tettau. There was also a large (3000) contingent of French Huguenot troops fighting with the Williamites. William did not yet have a high opinion of his English and Scottish troops, with the exception of the Ulster Protestant "skirmishers" who had held Derry in the previous year; the English and Scottish troops were felt at this stage to be politically unreliable, since James had been their legitimate monarch up to a year before. Moreover, they had only been raised recently and had seen little action. However, this battle would give William cause to evaluate them more favourably, due to the impressive behaviour of the English troops, such as the Duke of Beaufort's Regiment of Foot.

James’s flag was erected at the town of Donore, on the opposite side of the river Boyne. The Jacobites were 23,500 strong. James had several regiments of French troops, but most of his manpower was provided by Irish Catholics, with some English and Scottish Jacobites also present. The Jacobites' Irish cavalry, who were recruited from among the dispossessed Irish gentry, proved themselves to be high-calibre troops during the course of the battle. However, the Irish infantry, predominantly peasants who had been pressed into service, were not trained soldiers. They had been hastily trained, poorly equipped, and only a minority of them had functional muskets. In fact, some of them carried only farm implements such as scythes at the Boyne. Furthermore, the Jacobite infantry who actually had firearms were all equipped with the obsolete matchlock musket. The French and Irish troops wore a white rallying mark, as a compliment to the Bourbons and to distinguish them from the Williamites.

== Battle ==
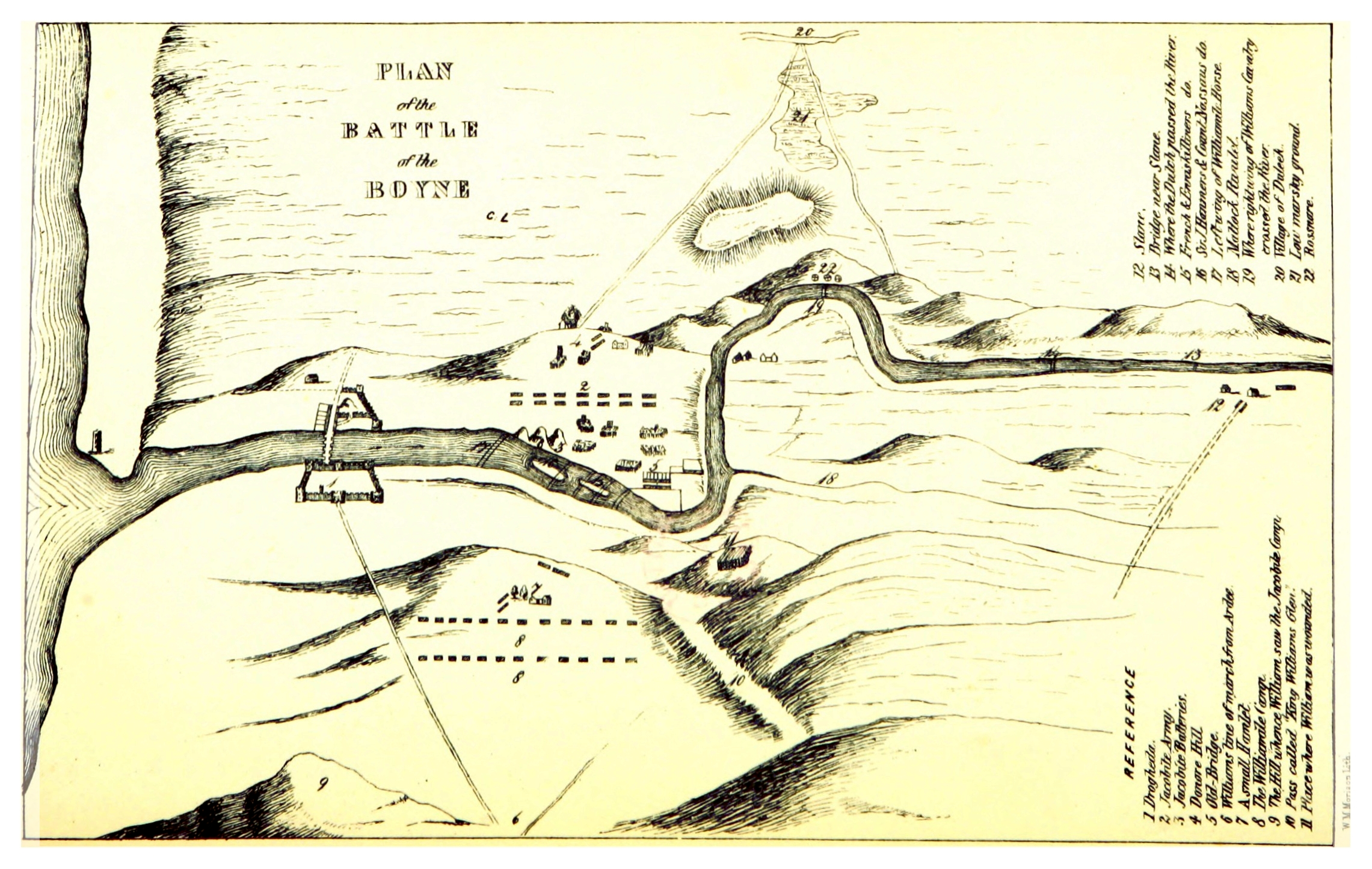
Map of the Battle of the Boyne. (South being up; west to the right.): 1. Drogheda 2. Jacobite army 3. Jacobite batteries 4. Donore 5. Oldbridge 6. William's line of march from Ardee 7. A small hamlet 8. The Williamite Camp 9. The hill whence William saw the Jacobite camp 10. Pass called King William's Glen 11. Place where William was wounded 12. Slane 13. Bridge near Slane 14. Where the Dutch passed the river 15. French and Enniskillingers ditto 16. Sir J. Hansner's & Count Nassau's ditto 17. Left wing of William's Horse 18. Mattlock rivulet 19. Where right wing of William's army crossed the river 20. Village of Duleek 21. Low marshy ground 22. Rosnaree

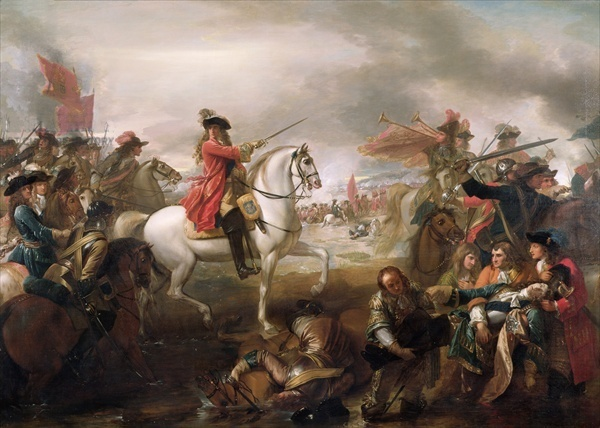
The Battle of the Boyne, painted by Benjamin West in 1778

William sailed from Hoylake in Cheshire, landing at Carrickfergus, County Antrim on 14 June O.S. and marched south. Referring to Dublin, he was heard to remark that "the place was worth fighting for". James chose to place his line of defence on the River Boyne, around 30 mi (48 km) from Dublin. The Williamites reached the Boyne on 29 June. The day before the battle, William himself had a narrow escape when he was wounded in the shoulder by Jacobite artillery while surveying the fords over which his troops would cross the Boyne.

The battle itself was fought on 1 July O.S. (11 July N.S.), for control of a ford on the Boyne near Drogheda, about 2.5 km (1.6 mi) north-west of the hamlet of Oldbridge. As a diversionary tactic, William sent about a quarter of his men under the cover of morning mist to cross the river at Roughgrange, about 4 km (2.5 mi) west of Donore and about 6 mi (9.7 km) south-west of Oldbridge. The Duke of Schomberg's son, Meinhardt, led this crossing, which a small force of Irish dragoons in picquet under Neil O'Neill unsuccessfully opposed. James thought that he might be outflanked and sent a large part of his army, including his best French troops along with most of his artillery, to counter this move. What neither side had realised was that there was a deep, swampy ravine at Roughgrange. Because of this ravine, the opposing forces there could not engage each other, but literally sat out the battle as artillery engaged. The Williamite forces went on a long detour march which, later in the day, almost saw them cut off the Jacobite retreat at the village of Naul.

At the main ford near Oldbridge, William's infantry, led by the elite Dutch Blue Guards under Solms, forced their way across the river, using their superior firepower to slowly drive back the Jacobite foot soldiers, but were pinned down when the Jacobite cavalry, commanded by James II's son James FitzJames, 1st Duke of Berwick, counter-attacked. Having secured the village of Oldbridge, the Williamite infantry tried to hold off successive Jacobite Irish cavalry attacks with disciplined volley fire, but many were scattered and driven into the river, with the exception of the Blue Guards. When William saw his Dutch Guards isolated on the enemy side of the river and without any protection from natural obstacles he was extremely worried according to an eyewitness:

But when he saw them stand their ground and fire by platoons, so that the horse were forced to run away in great disorder, he breathed out…, and said he had seen his Guards do that which he had never seen foot do in his life.

The Blue Guards had formed up in three separate squares and were, by using platoon fire, able to drive away the Jacobite cavalry. The Williamites were not able to resume their advance until their own horsemen managed to cross the river and, after being badly mauled, particularly the Huguenots, managed to hold off the Jacobite cavalry. William's second-in-command, the Duke of Schomberg, and George Walker were killed in this phase of the battle. The Irish cavalry finally gave up when Danish infantry commanded by Wurttemberg and cavalry led by Godert de Ginkel (about 11 or 12 squadrons), who had both crossed the river further downstream, advanced towards them.

The Jacobites retired in good order. William had a chance to trap them as they retreated across the River Nanny at Duleek, but his troops were held up by a successful rear-guard action. The Dutch secretary of King William, Constantijn Huygens Jr., has given a good description (in Dutch) of the battle and its aftermath, including subsequent cruelties committed by the victorious soldiers.

The casualty figures of the battle were quite low for a battle of such a scale—of the 50,000 or so participants, about 2,000 died. Three quarters of the dead were Jacobites. William's army had far more wounded. At the time, most casualties of battles tended to be inflicted in the pursuit of an already-beaten enemy; this did not happen at the Boyne, as the counter-attacks of the skilled Jacobite cavalry screened the retreat of the rest of their army, and in addition William was always disinclined to endanger the person of James, since he was the father of his wife, Mary. The Jacobites were badly demoralised by the order to retreat, which lost them the battle. Many of the Irish infantrymen deserted, abandoning clothing in their escape. The Williamites triumphantly marched into Dublin two days after the battle. The Jacobite army abandoned the city and marched to Limerick, behind the River Shannon, where they were unsuccessfully besieged.

Soon after the battle, William issued the Declaration of Finglas, offering full pardons to ordinary Jacobite soldiers, but not to their leaders.

== Aftermath ==
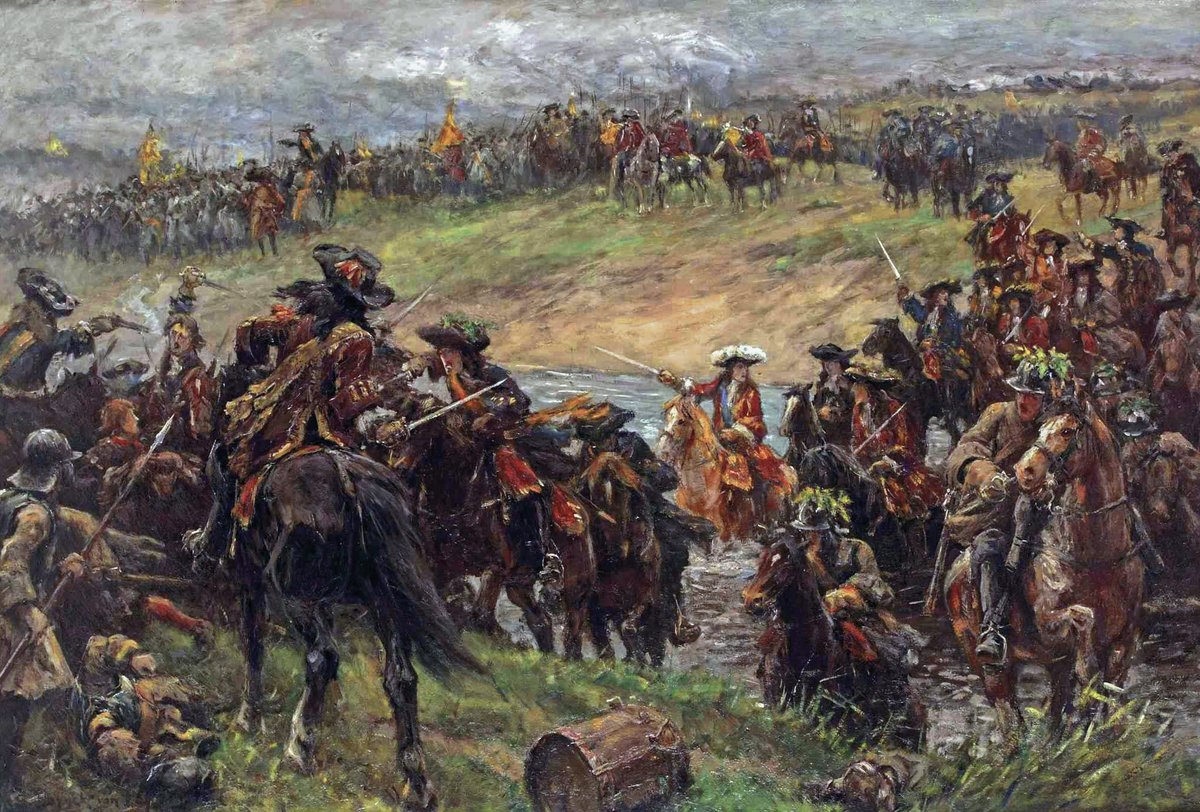
William crosses the Boyne, by Jan Hoynck van Papendrecht

The battle was overshadowed in Britain by the defeat of an Anglo-Dutch fleet by the French on the previous day at the Battle of Beachy Head, a far more serious event in the short term; but on the continent the Battle of the Boyne was treated as an important victory. Its importance lay in the fact that it was the first proper victory for the League of Augsburg, a precarious alliance between the Vatican and Protestant countries. The victory motivated more nations to join the alliance and in effect ended the fear of a French conquest of Europe.

The Boyne also had strategic significance for both England and Ireland. It marked the beginning of the end of James's hope of regaining his throne by military means and probably assured the triumph of the Glorious Revolution. In Scotland, news of this defeat temporarily silenced the Highlanders supporting the Jacobite rising, which had been led by Bonnie Dundee who was killed the previous July at the Battle of Killiecrankie. The battle was a general victory for William. Owing to the political situation mentioned above, Catholic institutions amongst William's continental allies hailed his victory with bell-ringing.

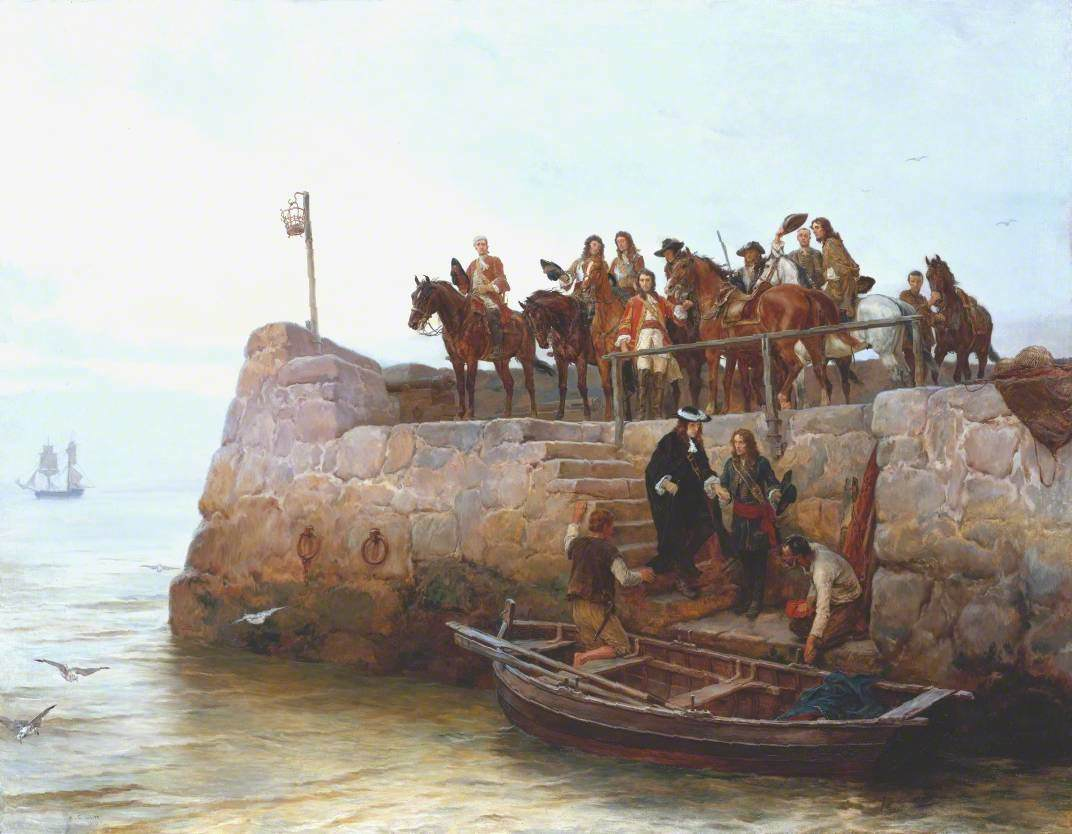
A Lost Cause by Andrew Carrick Gow, 1888. James II departing for France from Kinsale following the Boyne.

The battle caused the Jacobites to abandon the city of Dublin, which was occupied by William's forces, without a fight. Despairing of his hopes for victory, James II fled to Duncannon and returned to exile in France, even though his army left the field relatively unscathed. James's loss of nerve and speedy exit from the battlefield enraged his Irish supporters and he was derisively nicknamed Séamus a' chaca ("James the shit") in Irish. The war in Ireland had not ended, however. The Franco-Irish Jacobite army regrouped in Limerick and fought off a Williamite assault on the city in late August. It was not until the following year and battle of Aughrim that their forces were broken and after another siege of Limerick, they surrendered to William's general Godard de Ginkel. The war in Ireland formally ended with the Treaty of Limerick in 1691. This allowed over 14,000 Irish soldiers under Patrick Sarsfield, to leave for France and allowed most Irish Catholic land owners to keep their land provided they swore allegiance to William of Orange. However, the Protestant dominated Irish Parliament rejected these terms, not ratifying the treaty until 1697—and then not in full—and imposed a tough Penal Code resented by Irish Catholics for many years.

== Commemoration ==
Originally, the Twelfth of July commemoration was that of the 1691 Battle of Aughrim, symbolising British Protestants' victory in the Williamite war in Ireland. At Aughrim, which took place a year after the Boyne, the Jacobite army was destroyed, deciding the war in the Williamites' favour. The Boyne, which, in the old Julian calendar, took place on 1 July O.S., was treated as less important, third after Aughrim and the anniversary of the Irish Rebellion of 1641 on 23 October O.S.

In 1752, the Gregorian calendar was also adopted in Ireland. However, even after this date, "The Twelfth" continued to be commemorated at Aughrim, on 12 July NS, following the usual historical convention of commemorating events of that period within Great Britain and Ireland by mapping the Julian date directly onto the modern Gregorian calendar date (as happens for example with Guy Fawkes Night on 5 November). But, after the Orange Order was founded in 1795 amid sectarian violence in County Armagh, the two events were combined in the late 18th century.

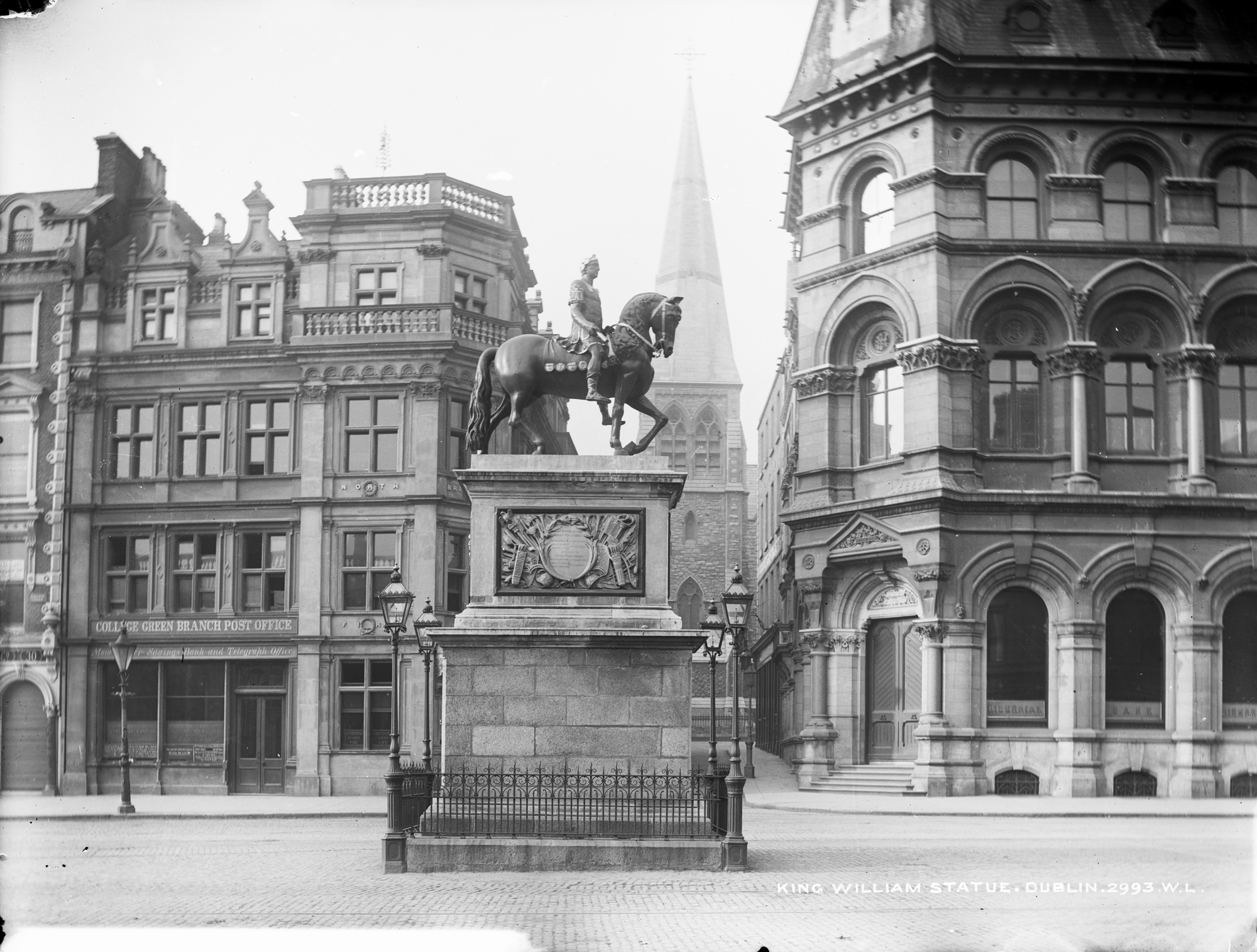
Statue of William of Orange on College Green, in Dublin, erected in 1701. It was destroyed in 1929.

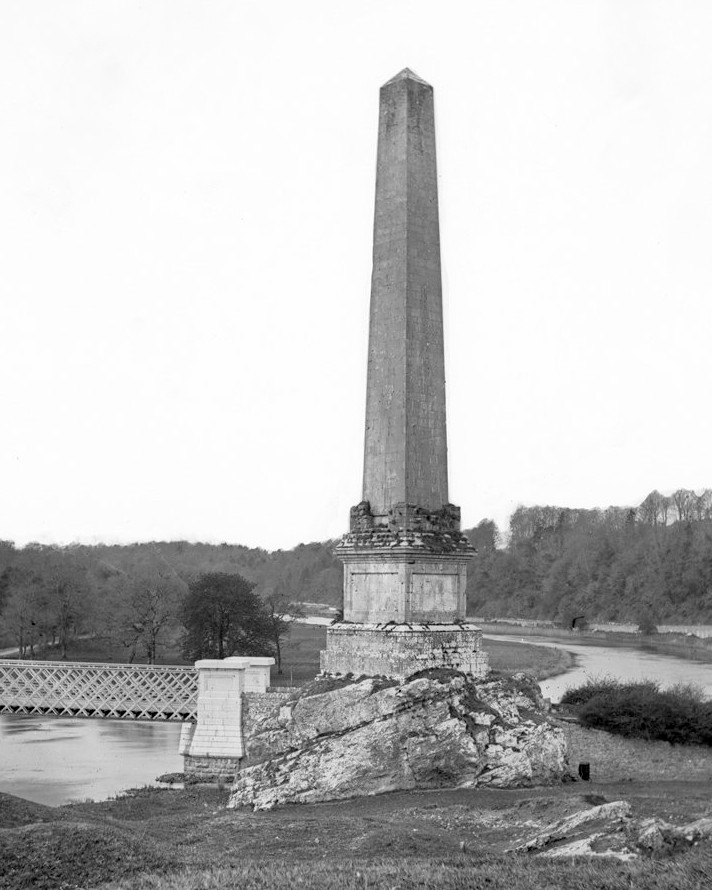
View of the commemorative Boyne Obelisk prior to 1883 (erected in 1736). It was destroyed in 1923.

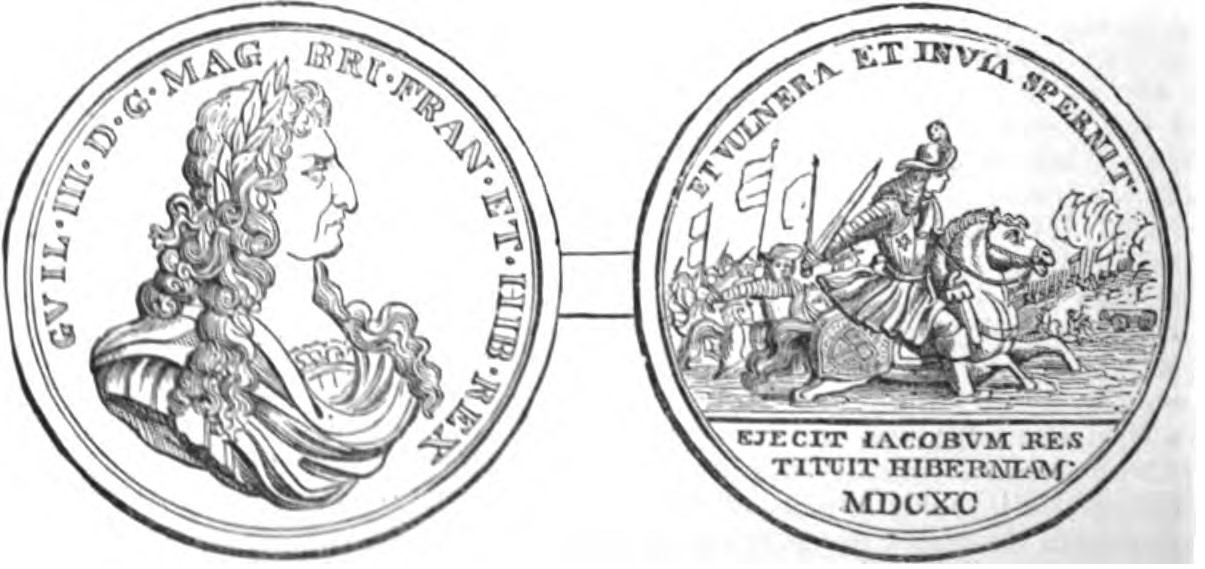
Medal struck to commemorate the Battle of the Boyne (Robert Chambers, p. 8, July 1832)

=== "The Twelfth" in Northern Ireland today ===
The Battle of the Boyne remains a controversial topic in Northern Ireland, where some Protestants remember it as the great victory over Catholics that resulted in the sovereignty of Parliament and the Protestant monarchy.

In recent decades, "The Twelfth" has often been marked by confrontations, as members of the Orange Order attempt to celebrate the date by marching past or through what they see as their traditional route. Some of these areas, however, now have a nationalist majority who object to marches passing through what they see as their areas, such as in Drumcree.

Many nationalists still see these marches as provocative, whilst Unionist marchers insist that it is part of their historical right to celebrate. Since the start of the Troubles, the celebrations of the battle have been seen as playing a critical role in the awareness of those involved in the unionist/nationalist tensions in Northern Ireland. Better policing and improved dialogue between the sides in the 21st century have made for more peaceful parades.

=== "The Eleventh Night" in Northern Ireland ===
There are also traditions set to happen on 11 July, the eve of the Twelfth Night, known as the Eleventh Night. On this night, Protestants ignite bonfires all over Northern Ireland to celebrate the commencement of the Twelfth Night.

The reason they use bonfires to symbolize the event dates back to the pagan celebrations of Midsummer, Bealtaine and Samhain, where fire is used as a symbol of celebration.

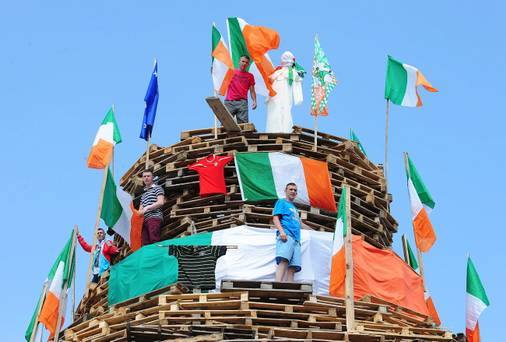
Bonfire pyre including the Tricolour flag

Many object to the use of bonfires in Loyalist celebrations today, especially because many bonfires now include "the burning of flags, effigies and election posters."

=== Battlefield preservation ===
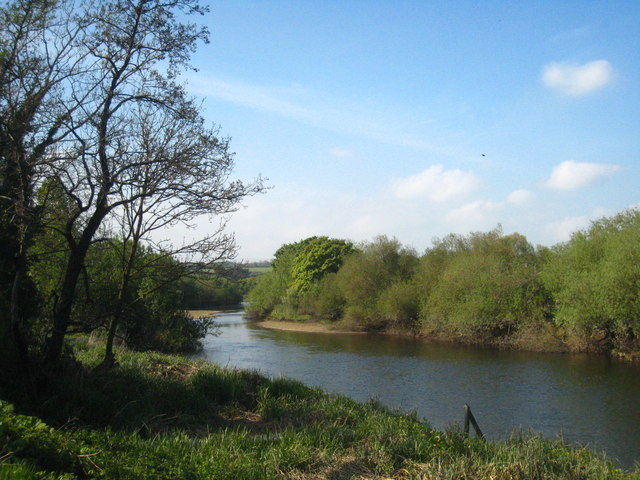
River Boyne at Oldbridge in 2011

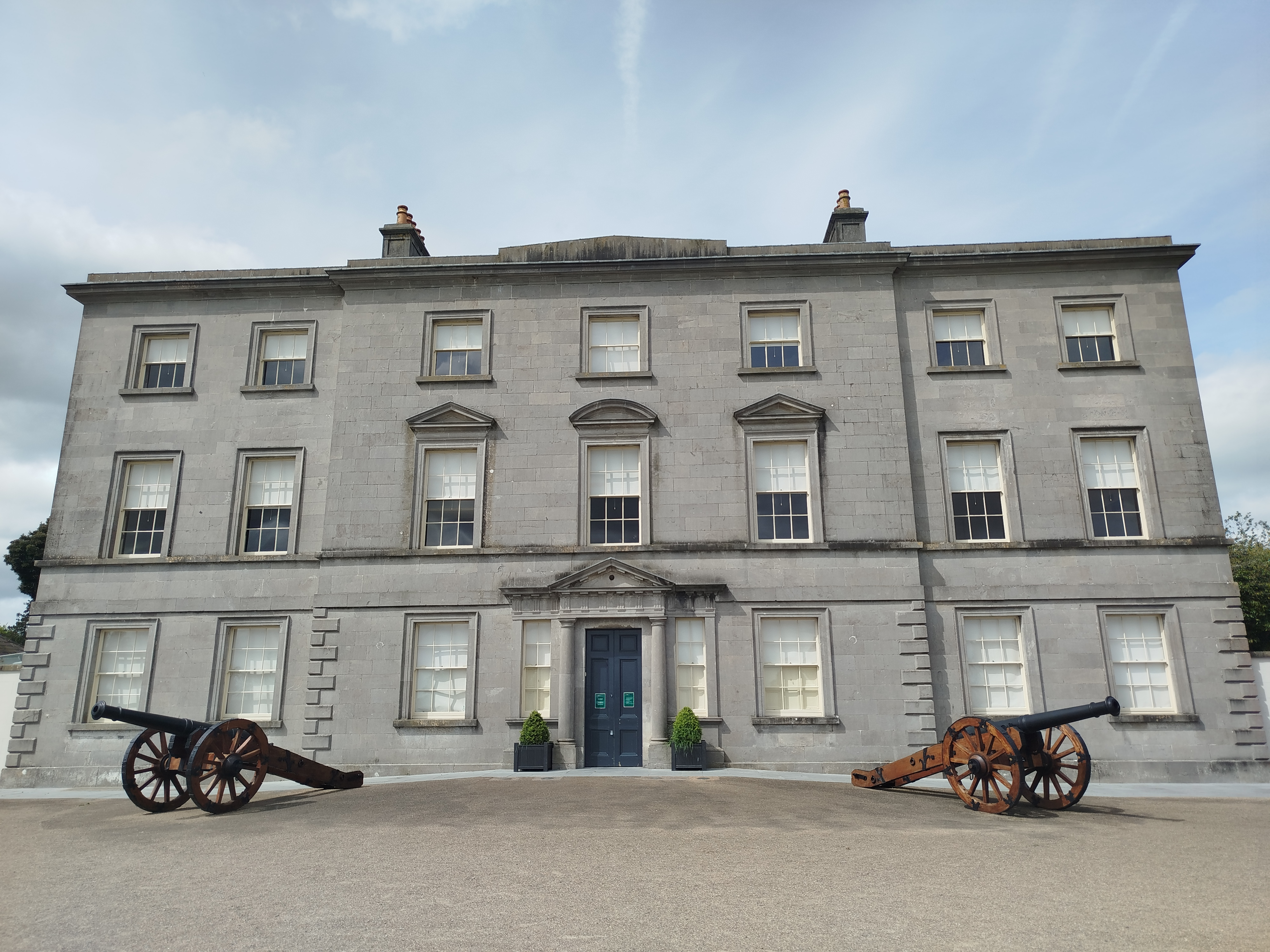
Battle of the Boyne Visitor Centre

The site of the Battle of the Boyne sprawls over a wide area west of the town of Drogheda in Ireland. In the County Development Plan for 2000, Meath County Council re-zoned the land at the eastern edge of Oldbridge, at the site of the main Williamite crossing, to residential status. A subsequent planning application for a development of over 700 houses was granted by Meath County Council and this was appealed against by local historians to An Bord Pleanála (The Planning Board). In March 2008, after an extremely long appeal process, An Bord Pleanála approved permission for this development to proceed. Further plans have been submitted for hundreds more homes and a link to the River Boyne Boardwalk.

The Battle of the Boyne Visitor Centre at Oldbridge House is run by the Office of Public Works, an agency of the Irish government, and is about one mi (1.6 km) to the west of the main river crossing point. The battle's other main combat areas, at Duleek, Donore and Plattin, along the Jacobite line of retreat, are marked with tourist information signs.

On 4 April 2007, in a sign of improving relations between unionist and nationalist groups, the newly elected First Minister of Northern Ireland, the Reverend Ian Paisley, was invited to visit the battle site by the Taoiseach (Prime Minister) Bertie Ahern later in the year. Following the invitation, Paisley commented that "such a visit would help to demonstrate how far we have come when we can celebrate and learn from the past so the next generation more clearly understands". On 10 May, the visit took place, and Paisley presented the Taoiseach with a Jacobite musket in return for Ahern's gift at the St Andrews talks of a walnut bowl made from a tree from the site. A new tree was also planted in the grounds of Oldbridge House by the two politicians to mark the occasion.

== See also ==
- The Boyne Water – Ulster Protestant folk song
- Irish calendar – Gregorian calendar as it is in use in Ireland
- List of conflicts in Ireland
- Military history of Britain
