= Inland Waterways Association of Ireland =

Non-governmental organisation

- Burgee

- Ensign
- Short name: IWAI
- Founded: 1954
- Location: Ireland
- Focus: Canals of Ireland and River navigations.
- Website: www.iwai.ie

The Inland Waterways Association of Ireland (IWAI; Irish: Cumann Uiscebhealaigh Intíre na hÉireann) is a registered charity and a limited company in the Republic of Ireland. IWAI (NI) is a wholly owned subsidiary of IWAI, therefore IWAI operates across the island of Ireland. It was founded in 1954 to campaign for the conservation and development of the inland waterways and their preservation as working navigations. As of 2024, the Association has approximately 2,000 members which are organised in twenty four branches (7 in Northern Ireland, 16 in the Republic and 1 activity-based branch).

IWAI also has two Special Interest Groups aiming to make the waterways safer to navigate - "Charts Sig" - and free from obstruction "Nav-Watch"

== Publications ==
The Association publishes a quarterly magazine called Inland Waterway News (IWN). It contains news about the Irish waterways along with articles from branches and special interest groups that make up the organisation.

== IWAI Charts ==
IWAI Charts are exclusive to members and offer the most comprehensive and up-to-date navigation charts covering the inland waterways on the island of Ireland, aiming to make the waterways safer and more enjoyable.

== Boat Rallies ==
The IWAI and its branches host boat rallies annually. These rallies include the Dublin rally, Shannon rally, Lough Derg rally, Lough Erne rally, Shannon Harbour rally and Naas rally. The Shannon rally is the biggest of these rallies. Only members of the Association can attend IWAI boat rallies. The rallies may include tests of boating skills, rescue exercises, a table quiz, fancy dress competitions, with awards ceremonies at the end. Some of the smaller branches hold small boat rallies with dingies. Branches that hold these are Boyne Navigation IWAI, Newry and Portadown IWAI and Lagan IWAI.

== Branches ==
- IWAI Athlone
- IWAI Barrow
- IWAI Belturbet
- IWAI Blackwater
- IWAI Boyle River
- IWAI Boyne Navigation
- IWAI Carrick-on-Shannon
- IWAI Coalisland
- IWAI Corrib
- IWAI Dublin
- IWAI Kildare
- IWAI Lagan
- IWAI Lough Derg
- IWAI Lough Erne
- IWAI Newry and Portadown
- IWAI North Barrow
- IWAI Offaly
- IWAI Powerboat Club
- IWAI River Suck
- River Bann and Lough Neagh
- IWAI Royal Canal
- IWAI Shannon Harbour
- IWAI Slaney
- IWAI Ulster

== See also ==
- Canals of Ireland
- Waterways Ireland
