= River Boyne =

River in Leinster, Ireland

River Boyne: An Bhóinn (Irish); Abhainn na Bóinne (Irish)
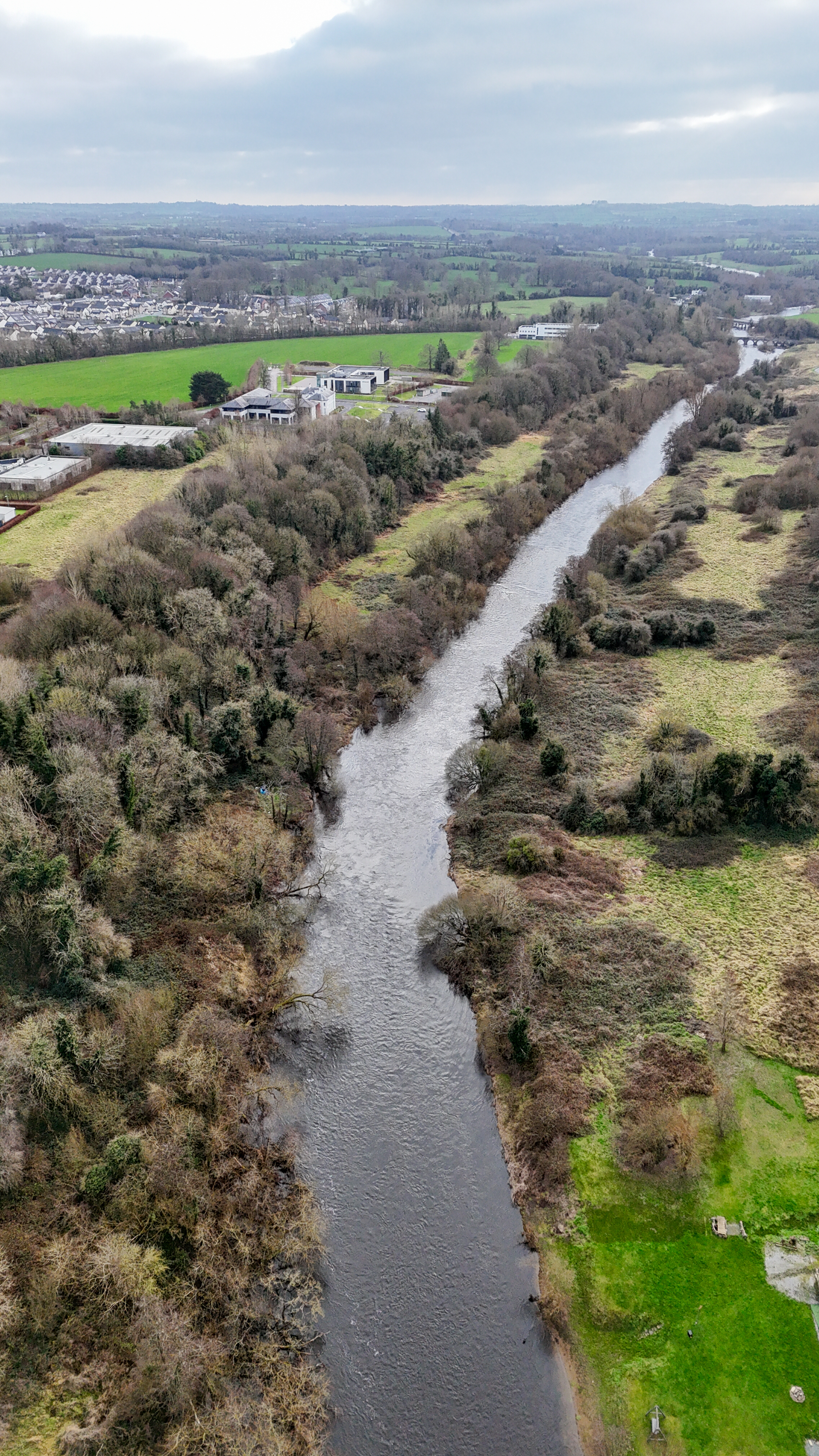
- River Boyne at Navan
- Etymology: Proto-Celtic *bou-windā, "white cow"
- Native name: An Bhóinn (Irish)

Location
- Country: Ireland
- Region: Leinster
- Counties: Kildare, Offaly, Meath, Louth

Physical characteristics
- Source: Trinity Well, Newberry Hall, near Carbury
  - location: County Kildare
  - coordinates: 53.351906542854074°N 6.956809100021702°W
- Mouth: Irish Sea
  - location: Between Mornington, County Meath, and Baltray, County Louth
  - coordinates: 53.72173°N 6.23813°W
- Length: 112 km (70 mi)
- Basin size: 2,695 km^{2} (1,041 sq mi)
- Discharge
  - average: 38.8 m^{3}/s (1,370 cu ft/s)

Basin features
- Tributaries
  - right: River Blackwater

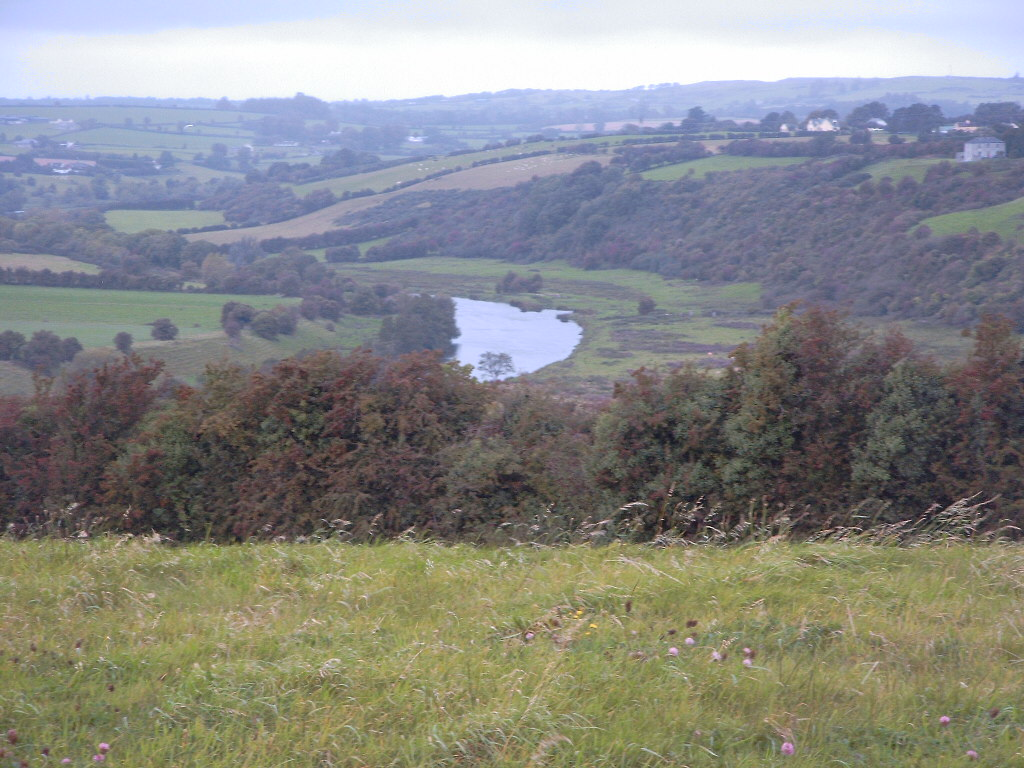
The River Boyne and Boyne Valley as seen from the Knowth passage tomb of Brú na Bóinne

The River Boyne (Irish: An Bhóinn or Abhainn na Bóinne) is a river which flows through Leinster, Ireland. It is about 112 kilometres (70 mi) long. The Boyne rises near Carbury, County Kildare and flows north-east along the border with County Offaly before entering County Meath to reach the Irish Sea between Mornington, County Meath and Baltray, County Louth.

The River Boyne is famously known for being the location of the Battle of the Boyne. These events saw Protestant King William III defeat Catholic King James. This dramatically shaped the political and religious future of Britain and Ireland.

== Names and etymology ==
This river has been known since ancient times. The Greek geographer Ptolemy drew a map of Ireland in the 2nd century that included the Boyne, which he called Βουουίνδα (Bouwinda) or Βουβίνδα (Boubinda), which in Celtic means "white cow" (Irish: bó fhionn). During the High Middle Ages, Giraldus Cambrensis called it the Boandus. In Irish mythology it is said that the river was created by the goddess Boann and Boyne is an anglicised form of the name. In other legends, it was in this river where Fionn mac Cumhail captured Fiontán, the Salmon of Knowledge. The Meath section of the Boyne was also known as Smior Fionn Feidhlimthe (the 'marrow of Fionn Feilim'). The tidal estuary of the Boyne, which extends inland as far as the confluence with the Mattock River, 'the curly hole', had a number of names in Irish literature and was associated as a place of departure and arrival in the ancient legends and myths, such as The Tragedy of the Sons of Tuireann, Togail Bruidne Dá Derga, &c. In the Acallam na Senórach the estuary has the name Inber Bic Loingsigh, abounding in ships. Inber Colpa or Inber Colptha was the principal name for the mouth of the Boyne in early medieval times. The townlands and civil parish of Colp, or Colpe on its southern shore preserve the name. It was associated in myth with Colpa of the Sword, a son of Míl Espáine, in the Milesian origin of the Irish, who drowned in the attempt to land there and is by tradition buried in the ringfort behind Colpe church. An alternative Dindsenchas tradition associates the name with the Máta, a massive aquatic creature, which having been killed was dismembered at Brú na Bóinne was thrown in the Boyne. Its shinbone (colptha) reached the estuary giving name to Inber Colptha.

== Course and geography ==
The Boyne is a lowland river, surrounded by the Boyne Valley. Near Donore Castle, it is joined by the River Deal, which transports water from Lough Lene. Much a stronger tributary, also from the left, is Kells Blackwater, which discharges into the Boyne in Navan, County Meath.

West of Drogheda, the Boyne is crossed by the Mary McAleese Boyne Valley Bridge, which carries the M1 motorway, and by the Boyne Viaduct, which carries the Dublin–Belfast railway line to the east. The catchment area of the Boyne is 2,695 km^{2}. The long-term average flow rate is 38.8 cubic metres (50.7 cu yd) per second.

=== Significance ===
Despite its short course, the Boyne has historical, archaeological and mythical connotations. The Battle of the Boyne, a major battle in Irish history, took place along the Boyne near Drogheda in 1690 during the Williamite war in Ireland. It passes through the ancient town of Trim, Trim Castle, the Hill of Tara (the ancient capital of the High King of Ireland), Navan, the Hill of Slane, Brú na Bóinne (a complex of megalithic monuments), Mellifont Abbey, and the medieval town of Drogheda. In the Boyne Valley can also be found other historical and archaeological monuments, including Loughcrew, Kells, Celtic crosses, and castles.

The Ulster Protestant song The Boyne Water is a folk ballad about the events.

== History ==
=== Boyne Canal ===
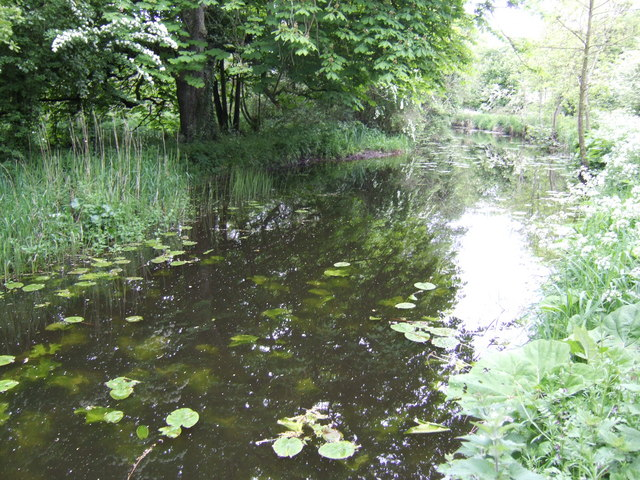
Section of the Boyne canal that runs parallel to the main river around the Battle of the Boyne site west of Drogheda

The Boyne Navigation is a series of canals running roughly parallel to the main river from Oldbridge near Drogheda to Navan. The navigation, owned by An Taisce and mostly derelict, is being restored to navigable status by the Inland Waterways Association of Ireland. The canal at Oldbridge, which runs through the Battle of the Boyne site, was the first to be restored.

=== Prehistoric art ===
A rock that showed indications of being prehistoric art was found in August 2013. Cliadh O'Gibne reported through the Archaeological Survey of Ireland that a boulder with geometric carvings had been found in Donore, County Meath.

=== Ancient log-boat ===
Workers from the Boyne Fishermen's Rescue and Recovery Service (BFRRS), near Drogheda, were performing one of its regular operations to remove shopping trolleys from the Boyne, in May 2013, when they discovered an ancient log-boat, which experts believe may be 5000 years old. Initial examination by an underwater archaeologist suggested that it could be very rare because, unlike other log-boats found here, it has oval shapes on the upper edge that could have held oars. Investigations were ongoing as of 2013.

=== Viking ship ===
In 2006, the remains of a Viking ship were found in the river bed in Drogheda during dredging operations. The vessel is to be excavated as it poses a hazard to navigation.

=== Annalistic references ===
- AI770.2 The battle of Bolg Bóinne [gained] against the Uí Néill, by the Laigin.

== Flora and fauna ==
The River Boyne is a Special Protection Area along much of its length due to the presence of kingfisher, protected under the EU Birds Directive. It is also a Special Area of Conservation due to the presence of Atlantic salmon, European river lamprey and Eurasian otter, as well as alluvial woodland habitats and alkaline fen.

== Gallery ==
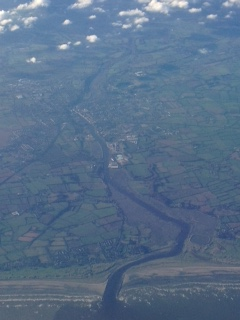
Aerial view of Drogheda and Boyne estuary

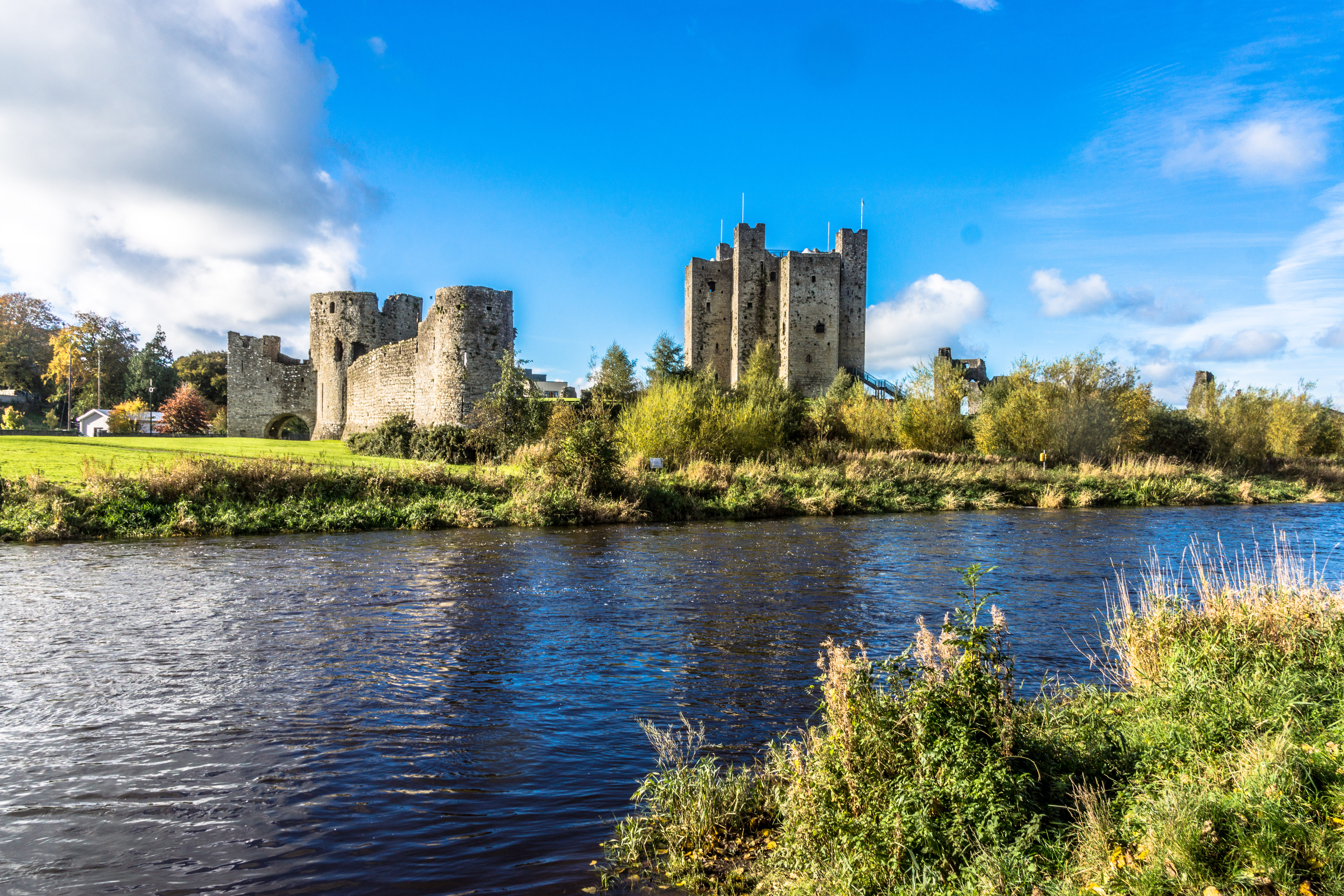
At Trim

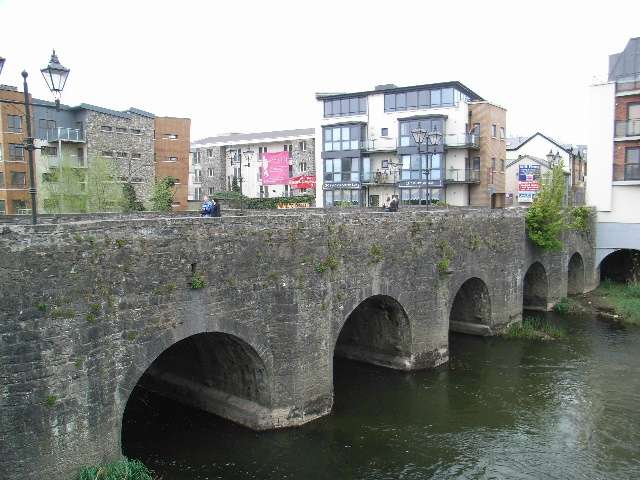
At Navan

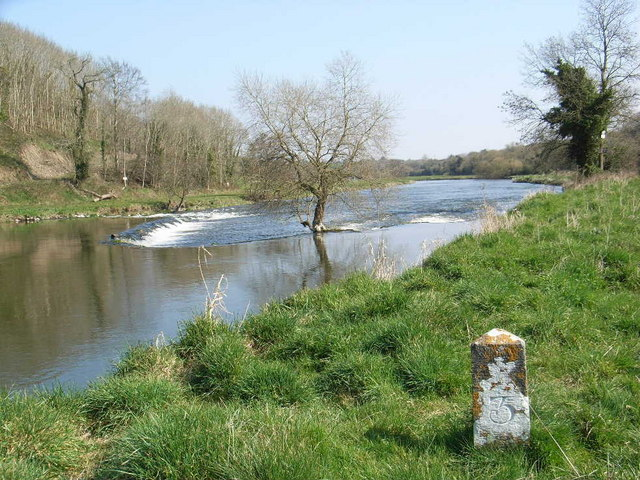
Weir near Stackallen

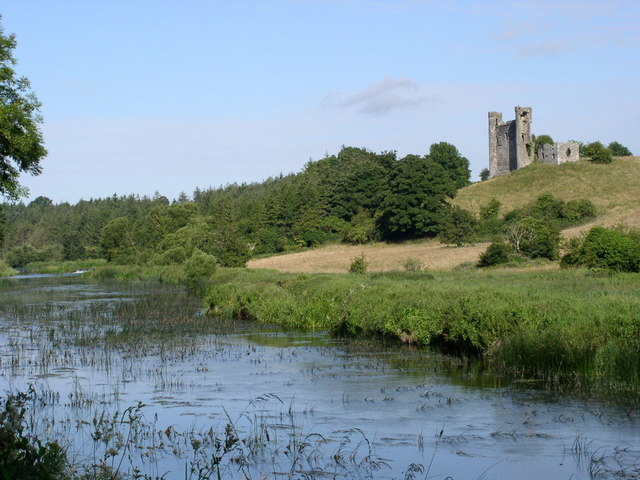
At Dunmoe Castle

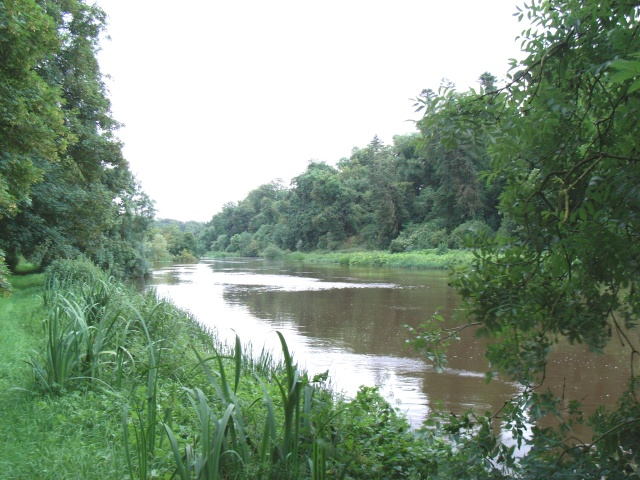
Upstream from Slane

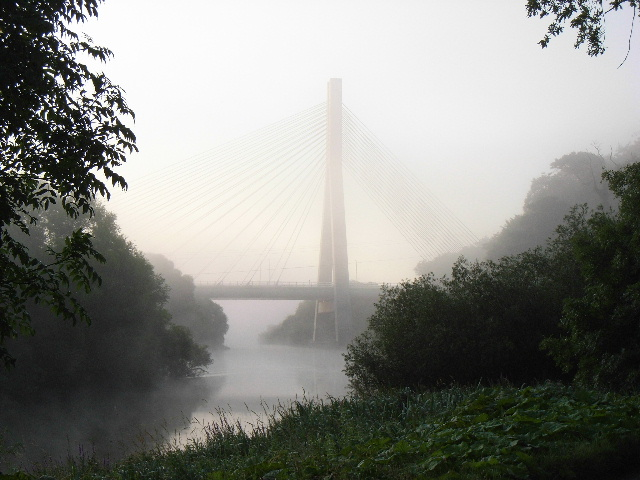
Passing under the M1 Boyne Bridge in Drogheda

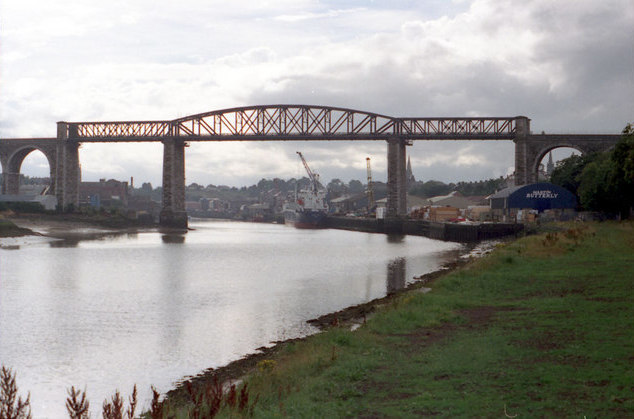
Boyne Viaduct

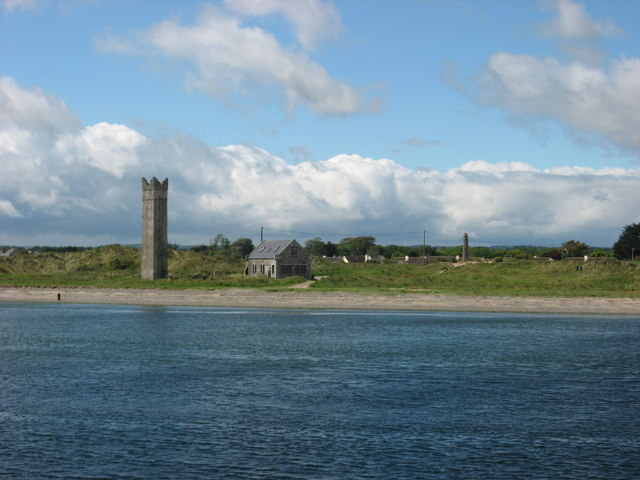
At Mornington

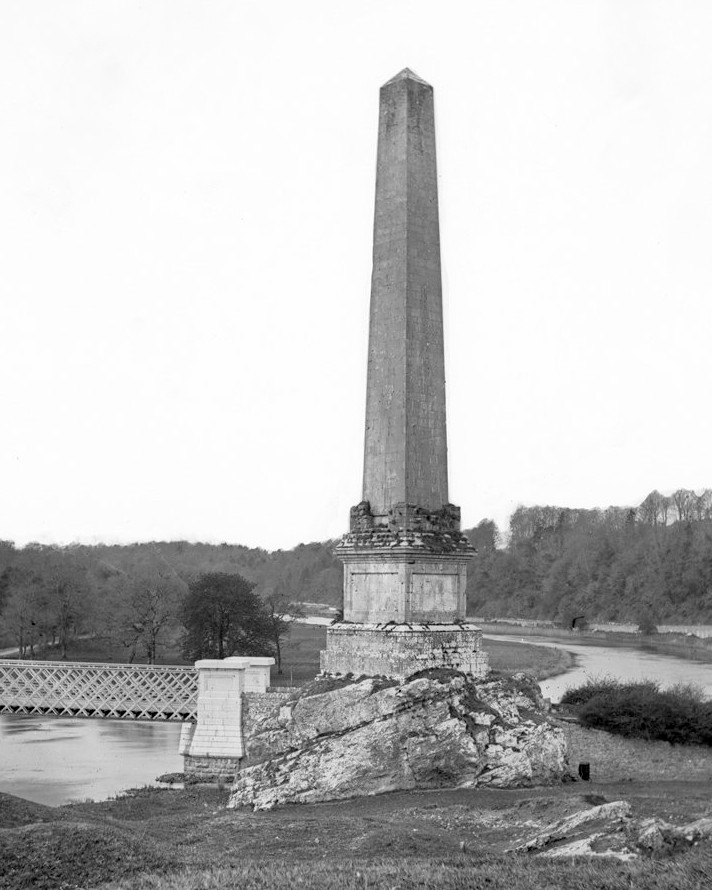
The former Boyne Obelisk, which stood on the north bank of the River Boyne (near Drogheda) from 1736 to 1923

== See also ==
- HMS Boyne
- Anthony Holten, author of The River Boyne: Hidden Legacies, History and Lore Explored on Foot and by Boat (ISBN 9780956991119)
