= Oldbridge =

Townland near Drogheda in County Meath, Ireland

Coordinates: 53.715309°N 6.409204°W

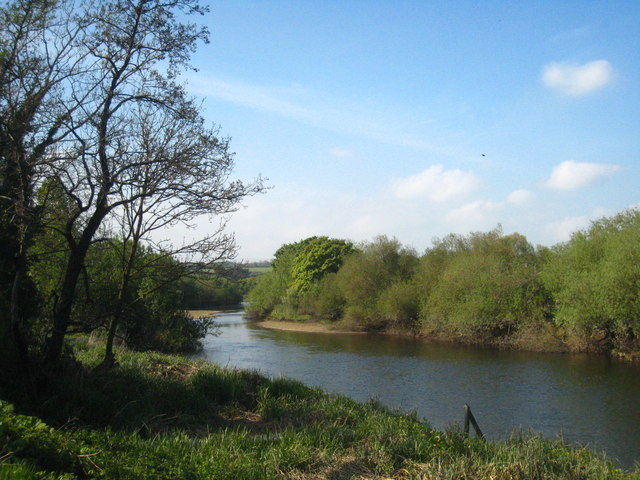
The River Boyne at Oldbridge

Oldbridge (Irish: An Seandroichead) is a townland near Drogheda in County Meath, Ireland. The area is home to the Boyne Navigation, the Battle of the Boyne Interpretive Centre and the southern half of the Mary McAleese Boyne Valley Bridge (which carries the M1 motorway).

== Navigation ==
The townland represents the furthest tidal reach on the River Boyne at a point called the "Curly Hole". Curly Hole is also a fishing location. Prior to the 12th century, this was the lowest crossing point of the Boyne. The Abbey of Mellifont owned the lands and fisheries here at dissolution in 1539. It was described then as "Oldebryge. 26 fishermen with 26 boats de Corrio (sc.corachs) paying £13.6.8". The Irish coracle was used for salmon fishing at this location up to at least the first half of the 20th century. One of the last coracles made locally was made in 1928 by Michael O'Brien of Oldbridge, for Adolf Mahr director of the National Museum of Ireland.

== Battle of the Boyne Site ==
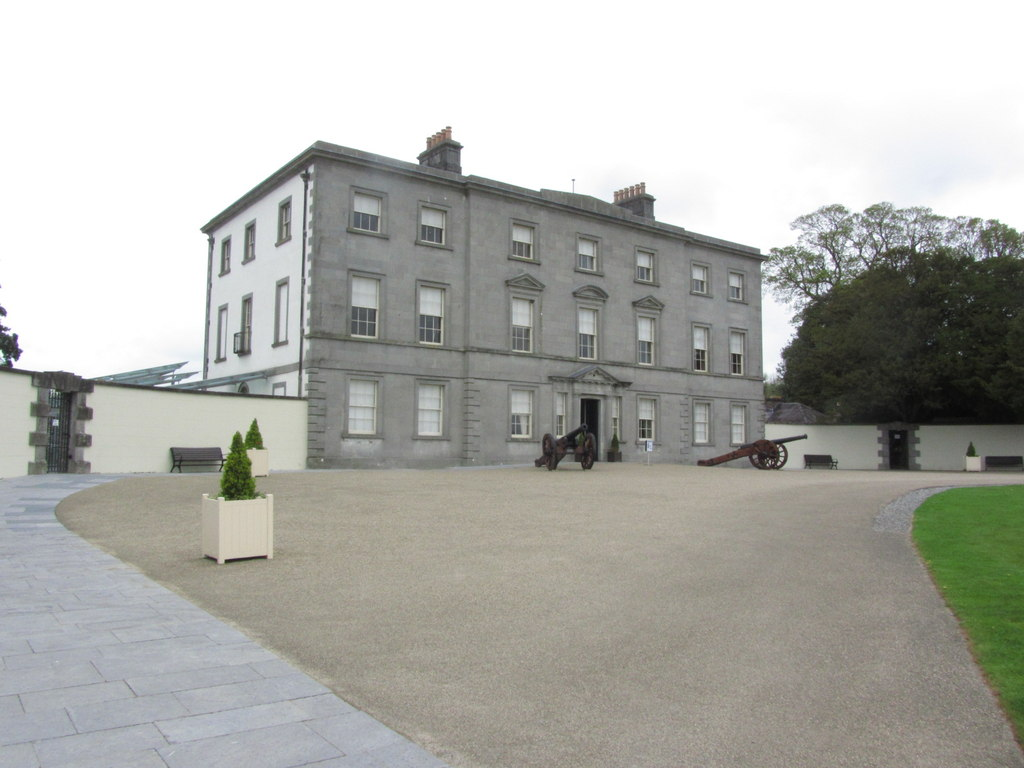
Oldbridge House now houses the Battle of the Boyne Visitor Centre

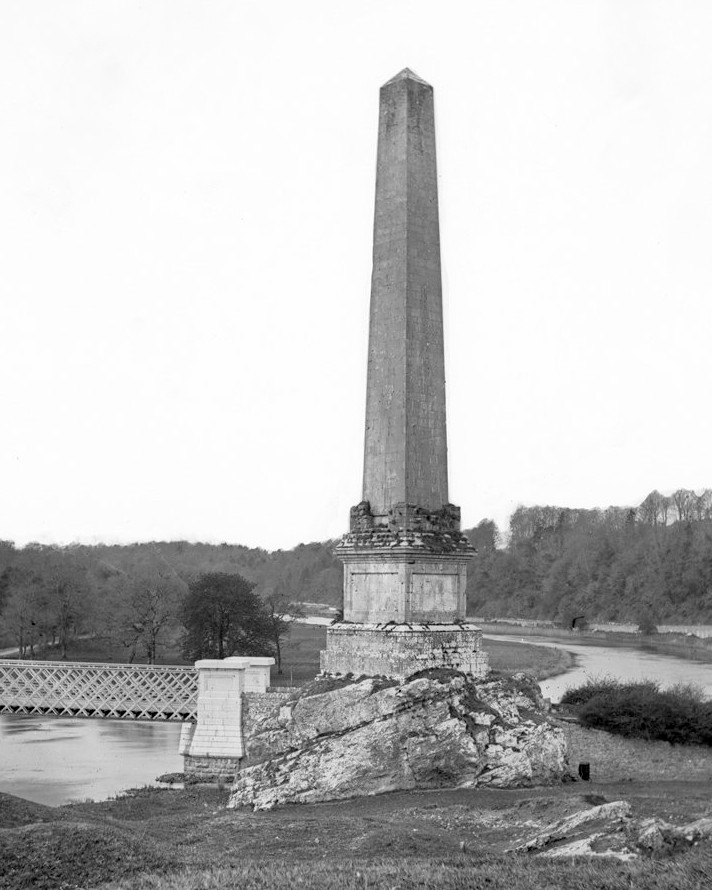
Former Boyne Obelisk (pictured c.1890), which was erected near Oldbridge in 1736 to commemorate the Battle of the Boyne. It was destroyed in 1923.

The site of the Battle of the Boyne extends over an area west of the town of Drogheda. In the County Development Plan for 2000, Meath County Council rezoned the land at the eastern edge of Oldbridge, at the site of the main Williamite crossing, to residential status. A subsequent planning application for a development of over 700 houses was granted by Meath County Council and this was appealed by local historians to An Bord Pleanala (The Planning Board). In March 2008 after a long appeal process, An Bord Pleanala approved permission for this development to proceed.

The Battle of the Boyne Interpretive Centre is approximately 1-mile (1.6 km) to the west of the main crossing point, on Oldbridge Estate. This facility was redeveloped in 2008 and is open to tourists.

In early 2007, the newly elected First Minister of Northern Ireland, Ian Paisley, was invited to visit the battle site by the then Taoiseach Bertie Ahern. Following the invitation, Paisley commented that "such a visit would help to demonstrate how far we have come when we can celebrate and learn from the past so the next generation more clearly understands". The visit took place in May 2007 and a tree was planted in the grounds of Oldbridge House to mark the occasion.
