= River Nanny =

River in County Meath, Ireland

Coordinates: 53°37′57.1″N 6°38′14.7″W

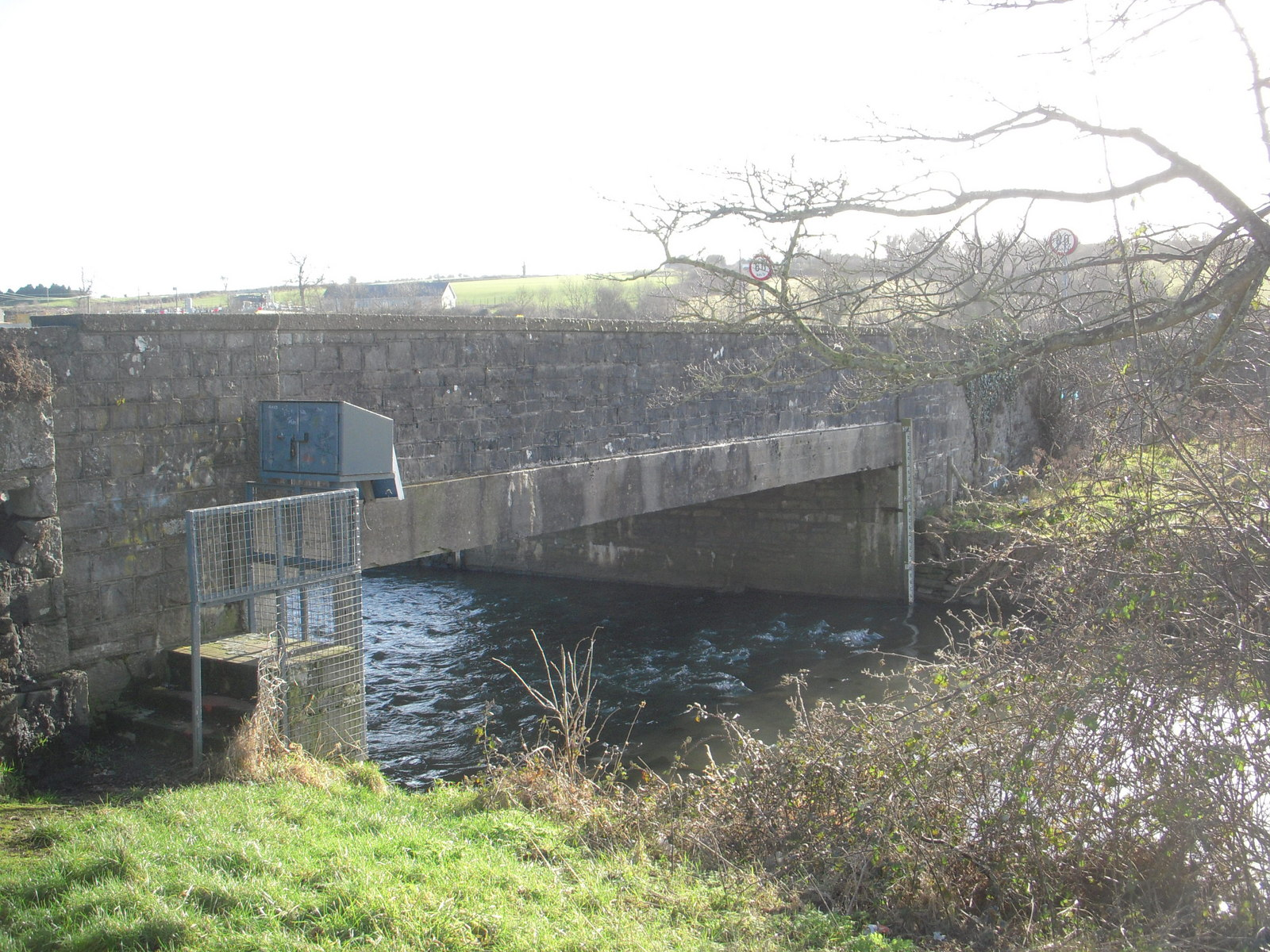
- Duleek Bridge crosses the Nanny
- Etymology: Old Irish Ainge; possibly named after the Corcu Ainge
- Native name: An Ainí (Irish)

Location
- Country: Ireland
- Province: Leinster
- County: County Meath

Physical characteristics
- Source
  - location: Johnstown village, near Kentstown, County Meath
  - elevation: 55 m (180 ft)
- Mouth: Irish Sea
  - location: Laytown
- Length: 28 km (17 mi)
- Basin size: 239 km^{2} (92 sq mi)

The River Nanny (Irish: An Ainí), also called the Nanny Water, is a river in County Meath, Ireland. It flows from Kentstown into the Irish Sea at Laytown. The river is known for its trout fishing, and its estuary on the Irish sea provides a haven for wintering birds. The Nanny is about 28 km (17 mi) long.

== Course and geology ==
The extensive tablelands between the River Boyne and the Nanny valleys form the Nanny watershed. The source lies upstream Navan, near Brannantowns; some authorities describe the source as 3 kilometres (2 mi) south of Navan, and it flows to Kentstown. It crosses under the N2 road near Balrath, and continues more or less parallel to the L1610 road. It has one significant tributary, the River Hurley, which joins it at Boolies Little. From there the Nanny flows east-north-east, gaining in water at the moors between Annesbrook and Duleek. From there it flows east, breaking into two streams between Gaffney and Beaumont, where it unites again, running adjacent briefly to the R150 road, and then flows east, crossing under the M1 motorway, travelling through Dardistown Cross, past Rockbellew, and runs parallel to the Duleek Road near Julianstown. After Julianstown, the river widens appreciably, flowing to the estuary south of Laytown.

There are also mounds of gravel near the Nanny source, a ridge of gravel about two miles long, compounded with limestone pebbles and stratified sandy layers.

From Julianstown, the side of the Nanny is marked by gray, thick-bedded crystalline limestone, freely exposed, and dipping northwards at 15 degrees. Limestone cliffs are also exposed along the river at Rock Bellew, although these are blueish gray in color. The river bends near Dardistown bridge, again at St. Columbkille's Well, and a quarter of a mile north of the well, exposing evenly bedded limestone similar to those exposed at Rock Bellew.

== Historical events ==
According to legend, in 848, Cineadh, lord of Cianachta-Breagh, allied with the Norsemen and rebelled against Malachy and plundered the churches and territories of the Hy-Niall from the River Shannon to the sea; a year later, the people of Malachy drown him in the Nanny (then known as the Ainge), which flowed through his patrimony.

During the Irish Rebellion of 1641 the Battle of Julianstown was fought at the Nanny Water crossing at Julianstown during which an English Royalist relief force from Dublin on its way to break the first siege of Drogheda was soundly defeated by Irish rebels.

During the Williamite Wars, after the Battle of the Boyne, the Jacobite army retreated from the field and headed for the bridge at Duleek, to cross the Nanny.

== Flora and fauna ==
According to legend, Saint Patrick had cursed several of the rivers in Meath, including the Nanny, for their deficit of fish. The river abounds with wild trout, however, and is stocked with brown trout, which accounts for more than half of the annual catch. The peak time for trout is March to May, and there is a fly fishing only stretch near Bellewstown. Sea trout also make their way up from the estuary.

== Estuary ==
The estuary stretches 2 km (1.2 mi) to 3 km (2 mi) and is an important site for wintering wading birds and is protected under the European Union Birds Directive. The formation itself is narrow and sheltered, providing an excellent habitat for waterbirds. Golden plovers, oystercatchers, ringed plovers and sanderlings shelter there over the winter. Other resident waterbirds include brent geese, bar-tailed godwits, great black-backed gulls, common gulls, Eurasian curlews, dunlins and great cormorants. The estuary channel is impacted by muddy sediment. It includes both salt and freshwater marsh, and some wet grassland areas. The salt marsh is most pronounced in the eastern side of the channel. Sea plantain, sea aster, red fescue, and sea purslane grow there. Deeper into the estuary, the marsh habitats support bulrush and yellow flag. The shore line, approximately 500 metres (1,600 ft) at low tide mark, includes beach and intertidal habitats.

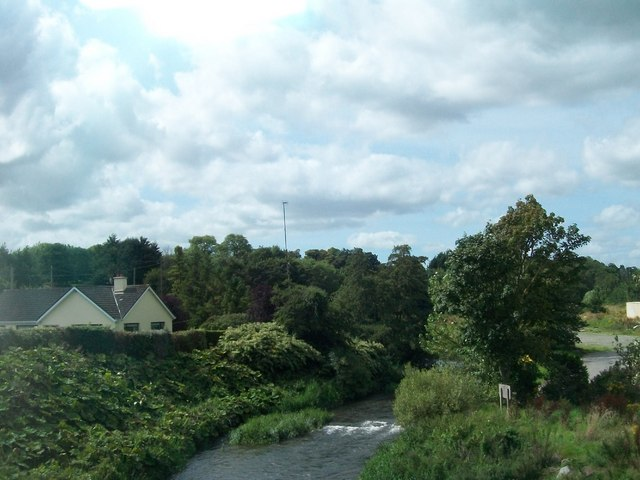
Rapids on the Nanny, at Julianstown

River Nanny at Sonairte Environmental Center, between Julianstown and Laytown

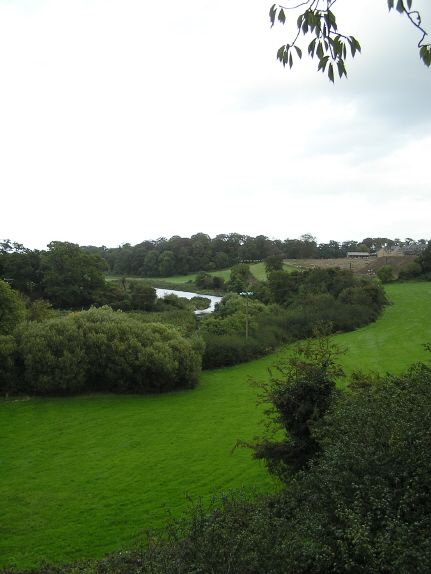
View of the River Nanny

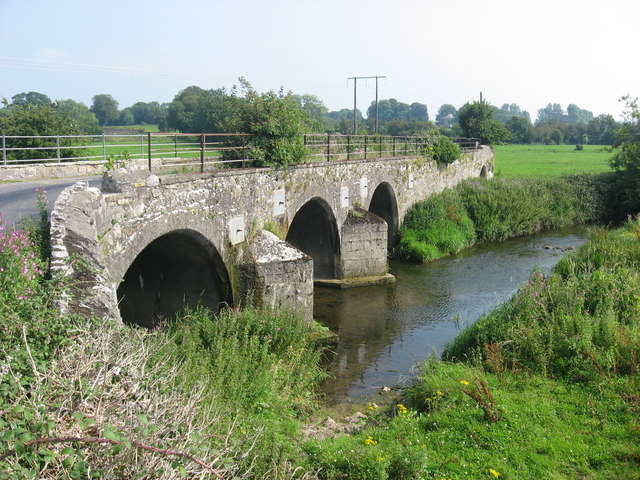
Bridge at Duleek, immediately below the junction of the Nanny and the Hurley river.

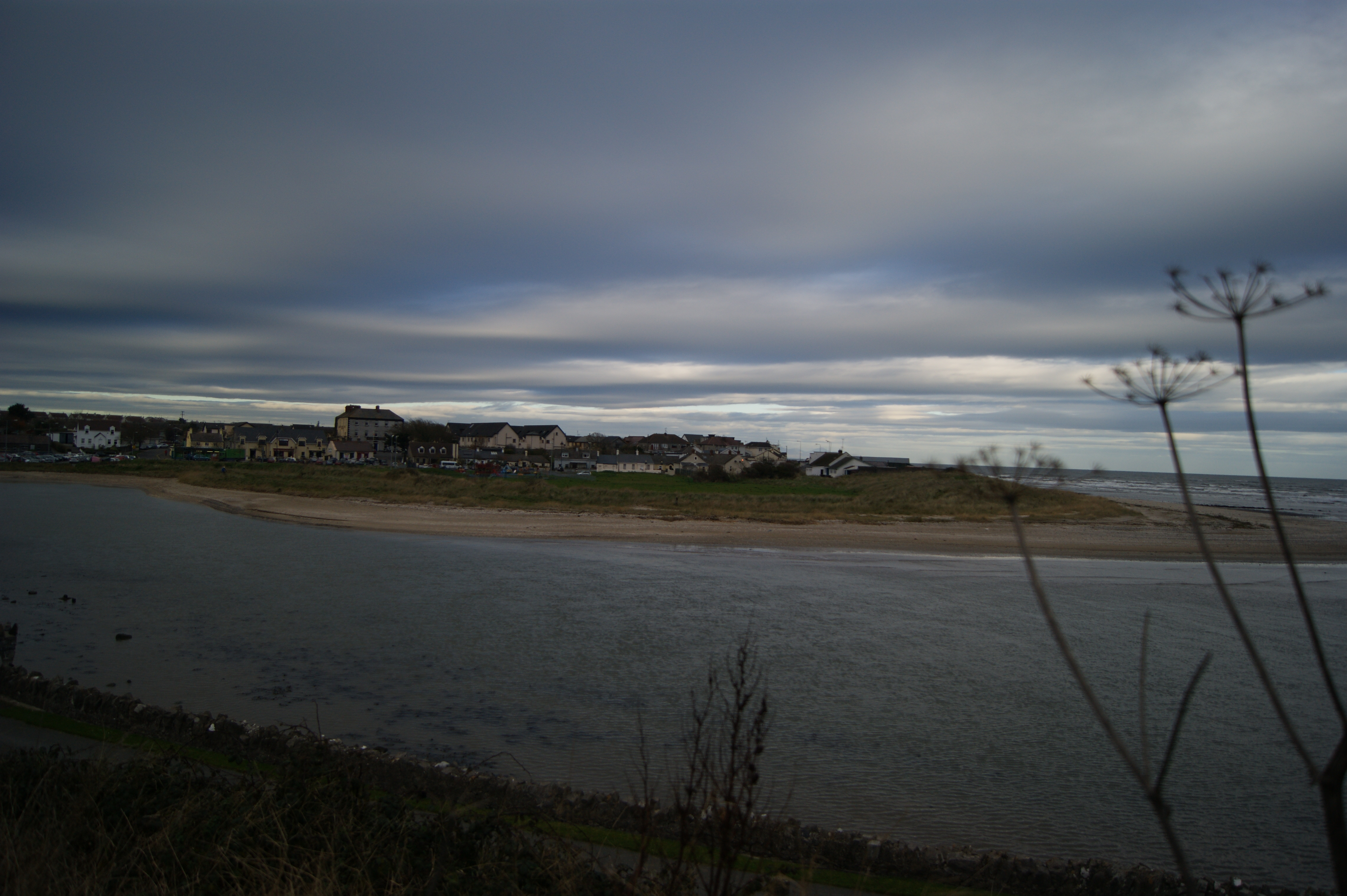
Estuary of the Nanny at Laytown

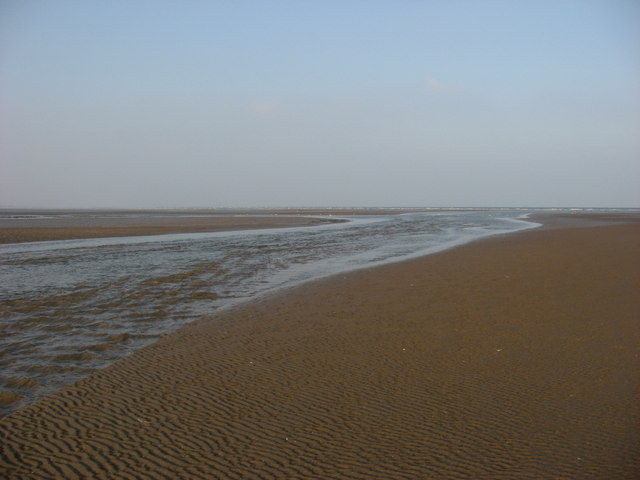
Nanny enters the Irish Sea

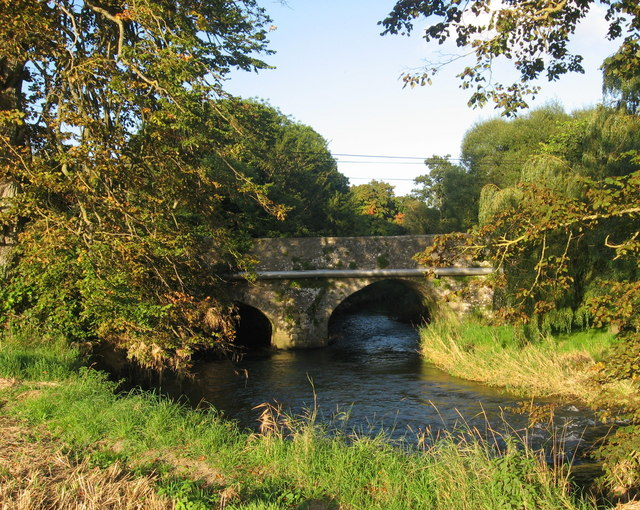
Nanny passes under Dardistown Bridge
