= Kentstown =

Village in County Meath, Ireland

Kentstown Irish: Baile an Cheantaigh
- Town
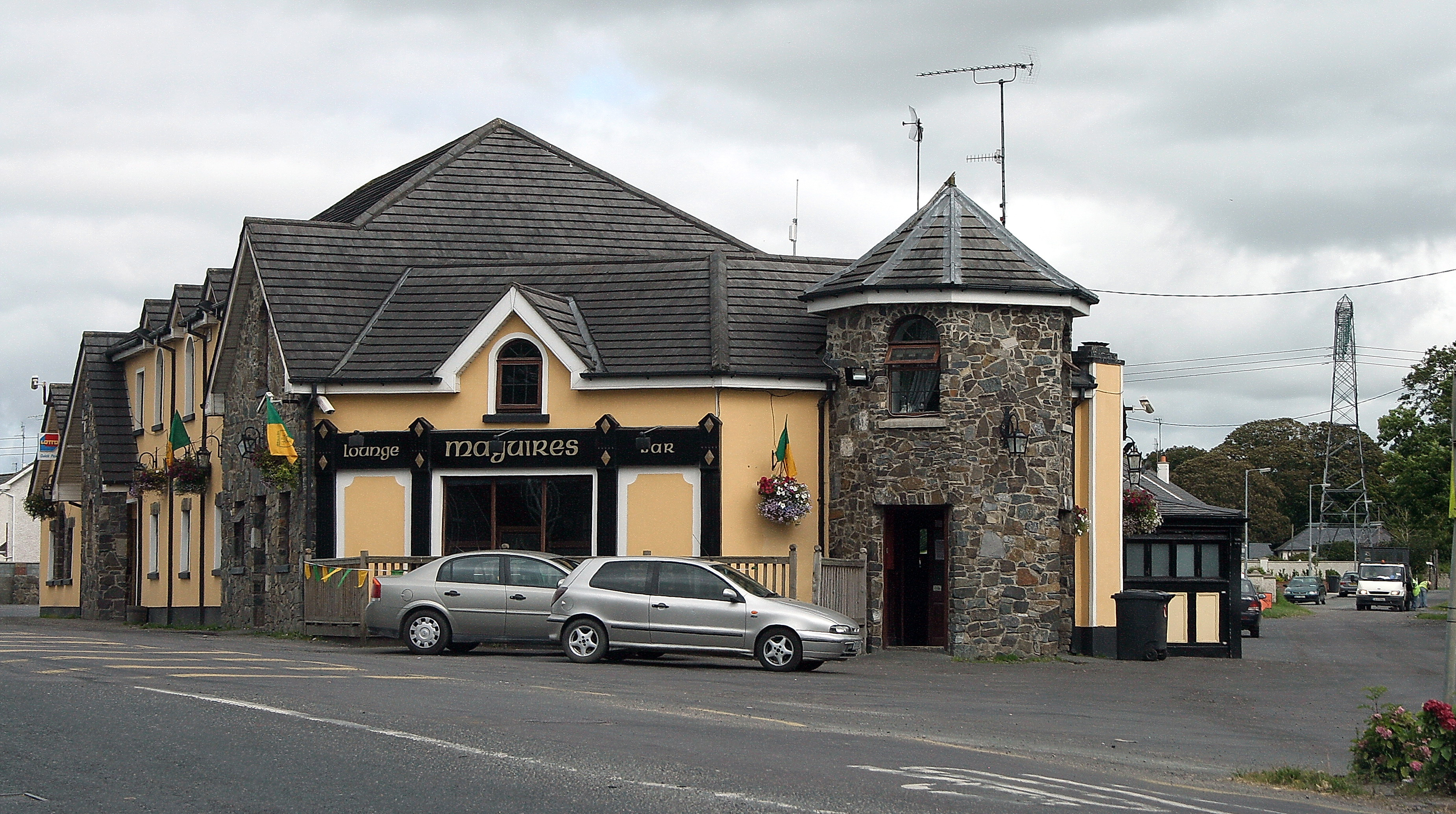
- Kentstown on the R150

- Location in Ireland
- Coordinates: 53°37′39″N 6°31′59″W
- Country: Ireland
- Province: Leinster
- County: Meath
- Elevation: 55 m (180 ft)

Population (2016)
  - Total: 1,179
- Time zone: UTC+0 (WET)
  - Summer (DST): UTC-1 (IST (WEST))
- Irish Grid Reference: N970651

Kentstown (Irish: Baile an Cheantaigh) is a village in County Meath, Ireland. It is 10 kilometres (6 mi) east of Navan, at the junction of the R153 and R150 roads. The village is in a townland and civil parish of the same name. The River Nanny rises outside of Kentstown, and flows about 18 miles to the Irish Sea at Laytown.

== History ==
There are two churches in Kentstown, the Roman Catholic Church of the Assumption (built in 1844 by the then parish priest Revd. J. Sheridan) and the Church of Ireland Saint Mary's (built in 1798 with funds from the local Protestant Somerville family). The Somerville family mausoleum can be found at the back of the church. The ruins of a medieval church are located in Danestown Cemetery, just outside of Kentstown which is next to Danestown Fort.

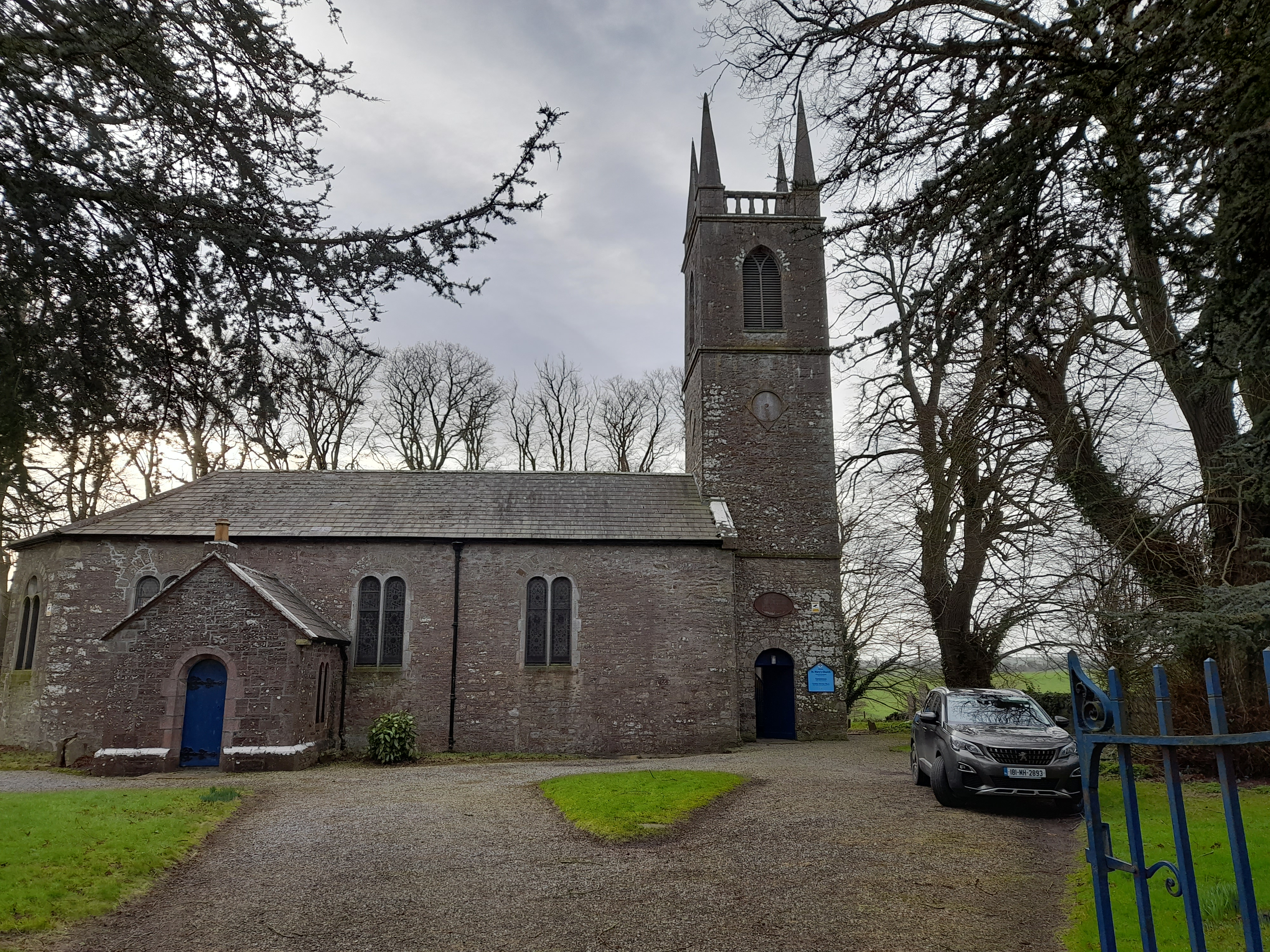
Saint Mary's Church of Ireland, Kentstown

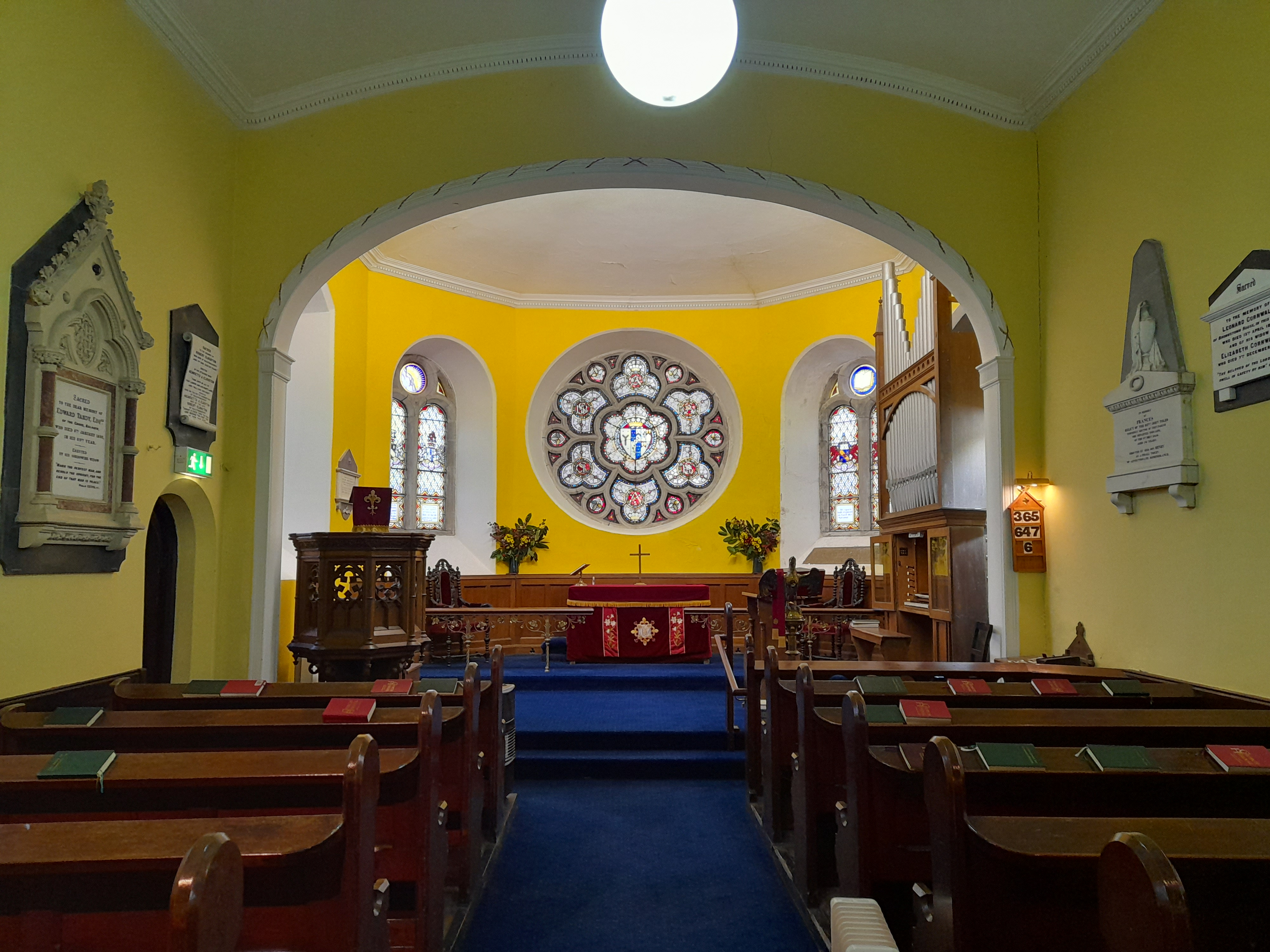
Saint Mary's Church of Ireland, Kentstown interior

In the Church of Ireland church, Saint Mary's, is an effigy in the shape of a medieval Norman knight carved on a slab. The knight wears a tight-fitting jupon and has a dagger on his right hip. An inscription, in Latin, accompanies it: "Here lies Thomas de Tuite, Knight, once Lord of Kentstown, who died on 2nd June 1363".

The Catholic church, the Church of the Assumption, was built on land donated by James Kinsella of Veldonstown and £200 was donated by William Somerville, 1st Baron Athlumney for its construction. The church, which was dedicated in 1854, has a gothic facade, paired with 5 bays of tall Gothic windows. Within the church is a medieval holy water font moved from the old ruined church in nearby Timoole. An inscription on the font reads: "This font stone was built by Robar e Hollywood, Anno Domini,1597, he being proctor (PlsXXVIII7XXIX)". There is also a large painting depicting the marriage of Saint Catherine to the side of the main door which was donated by the local Somerville family. The large marble high altar was brought from the Augustinian church in Drogheda. At the back of the altar, an inscription reads, "Erected at the request of Maria Soran Railthogue by her executors Christoper Daly and Thomas Byrne, Dec. 1907."

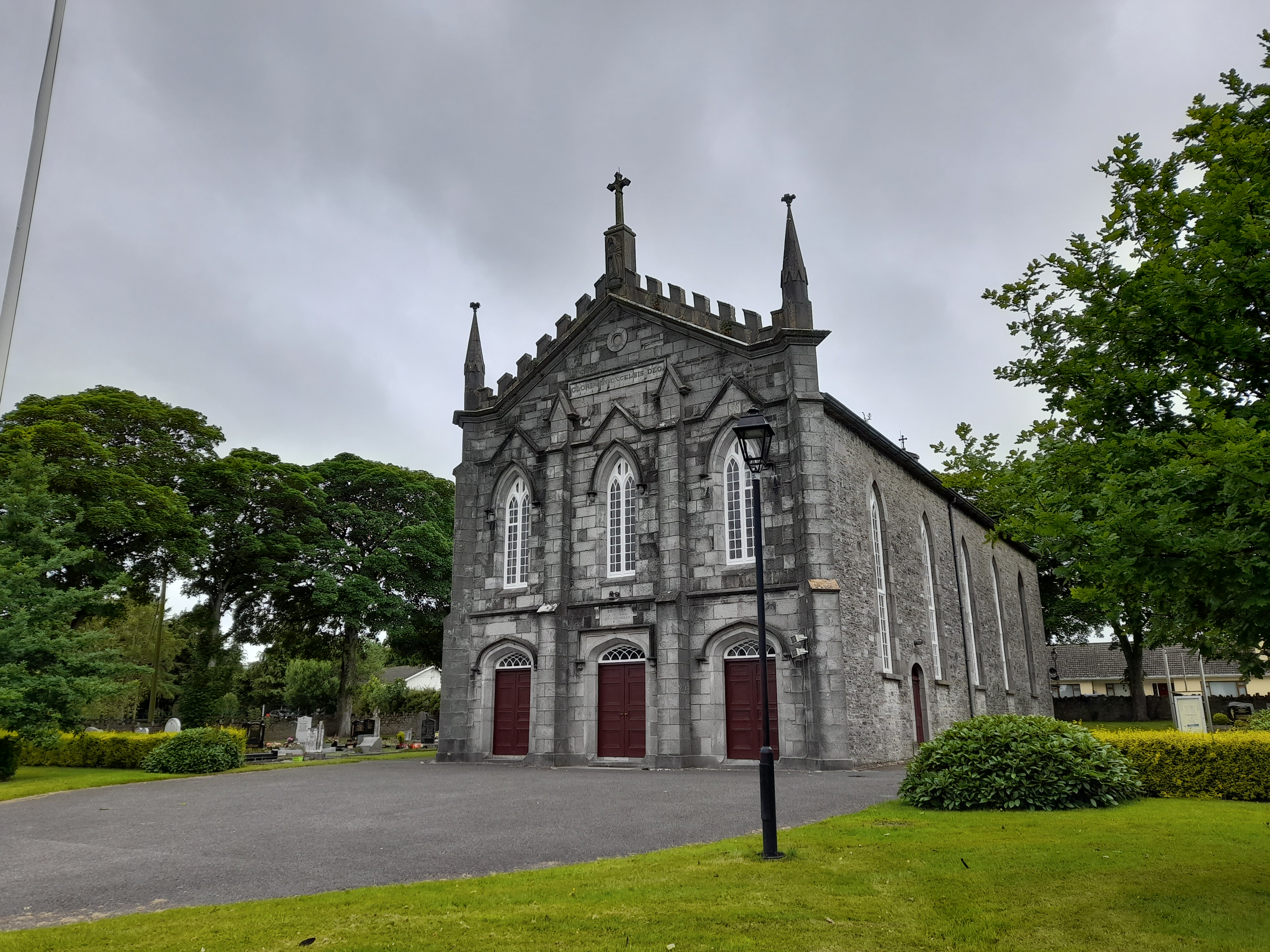
Church of the Assumption.

== Demographics ==
In the 20 years between the 1996 and 2016 census, the population of Kentstown more than tripled from 324 to 1,179 inhabitants. According to the 2016 census, 71% of the village's homes (252 of 353 households) were built between 1991 and 2010.

== Transport ==
Kentstown village is served by Bus Éireann route 105, which operates hourly in each direction providing links to Duleek, Drogheda and in the other direction to Ashbourne, Ratoath and Blanchardstown. In addition, route 103X (Dublin-Ashbourne-Navan) provides a limited service of a morning journey to Dublin and an evening journey to Navan Mondays to Fridays inclusive. In 2023 a new Transport for Ireland local link bus route, the 188 was added to Kentstown. The route, which starts in Athboy and ends in Drogheda connects Kentstown with other local villages and towns such as Navan, Donore and Duleek and also Newgrange Neolithic tomb.

== Notable people ==
- Graham Geraghty, former Meath Gaelic Footballer, won the All-Ireland twice with Meath
- Amedeo Guillet (1909–2010), a World War II Italian cavalry officer and former diplomat, retired to Kentstown in 1974 with his wife and lived in the old Protestant village rectory.
- Fr. Patrick Tully, who managed the Meath Mens Gaelic Football team to three All-Ireland titles, in 1949, 1954 and 1967
