= Cianán =

Irish bishop and saint

St. Cianán, or Kenan, (died 24 November 489) was a Bishop of Duleek in Ireland. He was descended from the royal blood of the kings of Munster. His feast day is 24 November.

== Life ==
Cianán was a pupil of the monk Nathan. As a youth, he was one of the fifty hostages whom the princes of Ireland gave to king Lóegaire mac Néill, by whom he was set free at the intercession of Bishop Ciarán. He then went into Gaul, and passed some time at Tours in the monastery of St. Martin.

Returning to his native country, he converted great numbers to Christianity in Connacht. He then went to Leinster, and founded a church in a place called to this day the Wood of Cianán. At length, he went into the territory of Eoghan (Tír Eoghain), who was his mother Eithne's uncle. There, he broke down a pagan altar and an idol and on the place built a Christian church. According to manuscripts extant in the library at Cambridge, Cianán built here a church of stone, on that account called Damliag, corrupted into Duleek. It was the site of the first stone church in Ireland. He died on 24 November, in 489.

Modern research indicates Cianán may have been the origin behind the tribal name of Ciannachta. It also could explain the confusion over the site of his stone church being located in accounts within the territory of Eoghan, in north Ulster, while actually at Duleek in County Meath. A branch of the Ciannachta settled in Keenaght, County Londonderry, and may have carried the association with them.

Having suffered greatly by several fires and devastations of the Danes, Duleek united its episcopal see to the diocese of Meath.

== Sources ==
- James Ussher, Antiq. 1. 29, and Primord. p. 1070.
- Usher, Ind. Chron. ad ann. 450.
