= Duleek =

Town in County Meath, Ireland

Duleek Damhliag
- Town
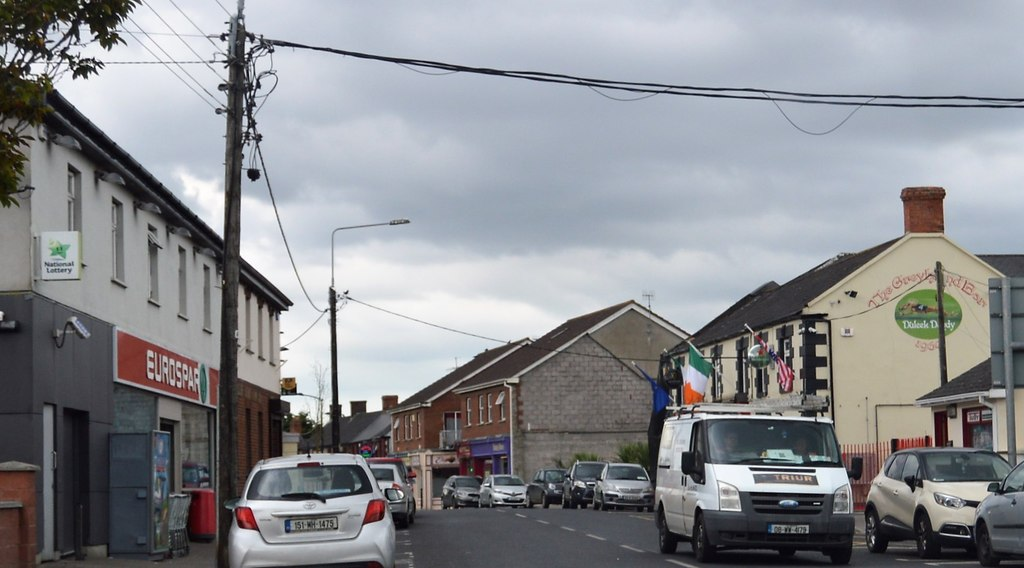
- Main Street, Duleek

- Location in Ireland
- Coordinates: 53°39′18″N 6°25′00″W
- Country: Ireland
- Province: Leinster
- County: County Meath
- Elevation: 34 m (112 ft)

Population (2022)
  - Total: 4,899
- Irish Grid Reference: O048687

Duleek (/duːˈliːk/; Irish: Damhliag, meaning 'stone house or church') is a small town in County Meath, Ireland.

Duleek takes its name from the Irish words daimh and liag, meaning house of stones, referring to an early stone-built church, St. Cianán's Church, the ruins of which are still visible in Duleek today.

As of the 2022 census, the population of Duleek reached 4,899, a two-fold increase since 2002. The town is 8 km south-west of Drogheda, and 35 km north of Dublin city centre. Duleek is in a civil parish of the same name.

== History ==
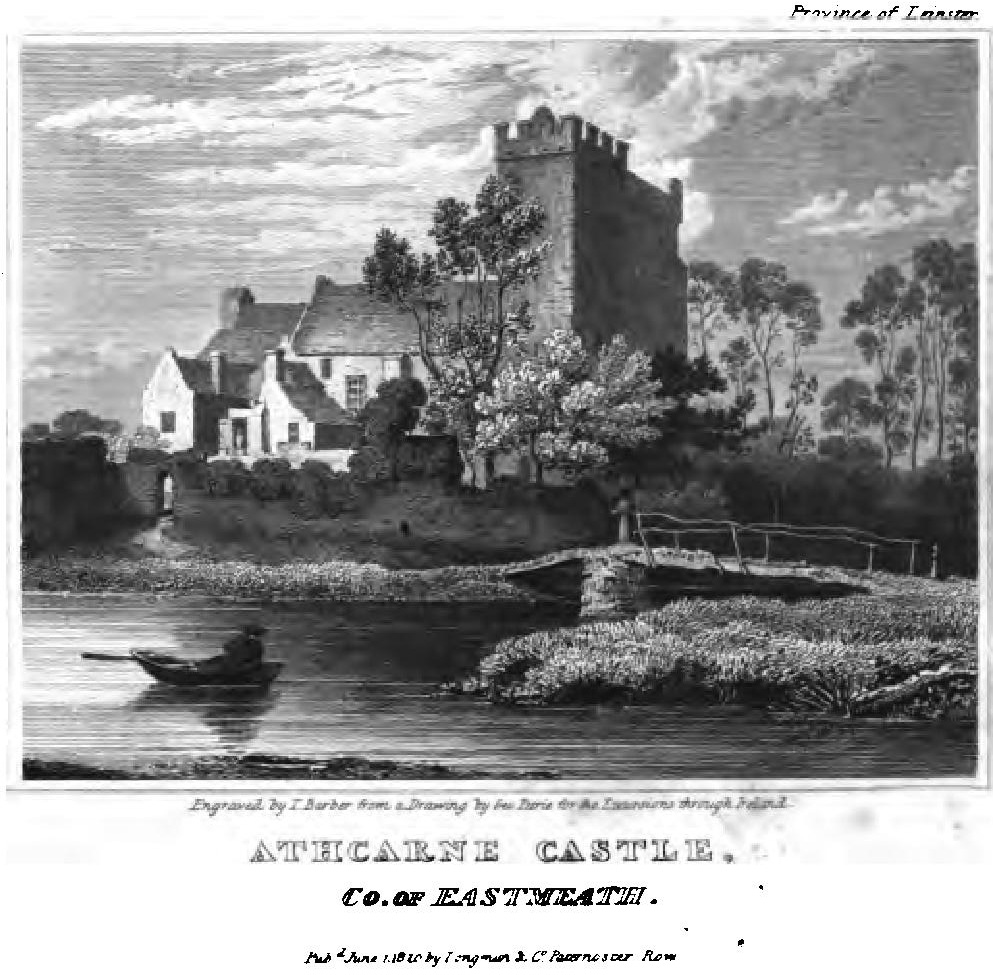
Athcarne Castle, Co. Meath, 1820

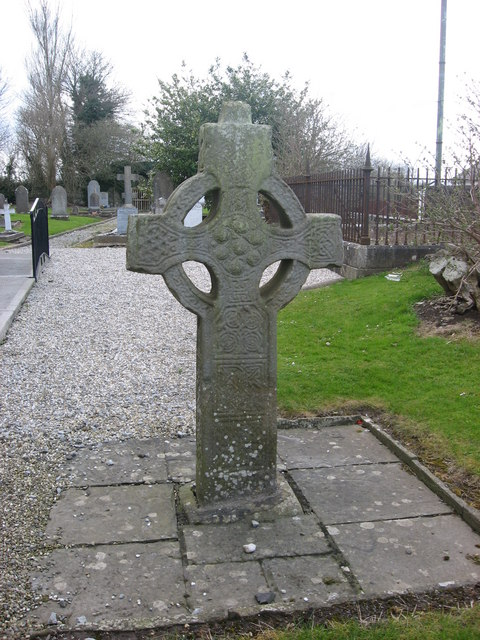
High Cross at Duleek

Duleek began as an early Christian monastic settlement. Saint Patrick established a bishopric here about 450 AD, which he placed in the care of Saint Cianán on 24 November 489. The place was sacked several times by the Norsemen between 830 and 1149 and was also pillaged by the Normans in 1171. In April 1014, the bodies of Brian Ború and his son lay in state in Duleek on their way to Armagh. The original monastery settlement is reputed to be the place where Saint Patrick and several contemporaries spent the winter period while compiling the Seanchas Mór, the first written compiled form of the ancient Brehon Laws of Ireland, in the fifth century. The 12th century saw the reconstitution of the original monastery as Saint Mary's Abbey and the subsumption of the Diocese of Duleek by the Diocese of Meath.

The first Anglo-Norman Lord of Meath, Hugh de Lacy, established a manor and constructed a motte castle at Duleek. In 1180, he granted Saint Cianán's Church, together with certain lands, to the Augustinians. The churchyard of the now disused Church of Ireland church occupies part of the site of the early monastery. On the opposite side of the village, in the townland of Abbeyland, close to the River Nanny and Duleek House there are ruins of the Grange of Saint Michael. This grange was established in about 1172 by Augustinian monks from Llanthony in Monmouthshire; the lands were granted to them by the De Lacy family. The village's four crosses and the lime tree on the village green are reminders of Duleek's links to the struggle between William III and James II and to wider European unrest at the time of Louis XIV. A 10th century high cross is located just north of the church. Scenes from the New Testament are located on its west side this cross, another segment of a cross is located inside the church. Another cross, the Wayward Cross, was erected in 1601 by Janet Dowdall in memory of her husband, Sir William Bathe of Athcarne Castle, outside the village. During World War II, or The Emergency, German bombers accidentally struck the village on 1 January 1941, causing minor damage without casualties.

The Duleek Heritage Trail covers a number of sites in the village centre and was "conceived as a series of stepping stones through the village" and its history.

Historical population
Year	Pop.	±%
1991	1,718	—
1996	1,731	+0.8%
2002	2,173	+25.5%
2006	3,236	+48.9%
2011	3,988	+23.2%
2016	4,219	+5.8%
2022	4,899	+16.1%

== Transport ==
=== Rail ===
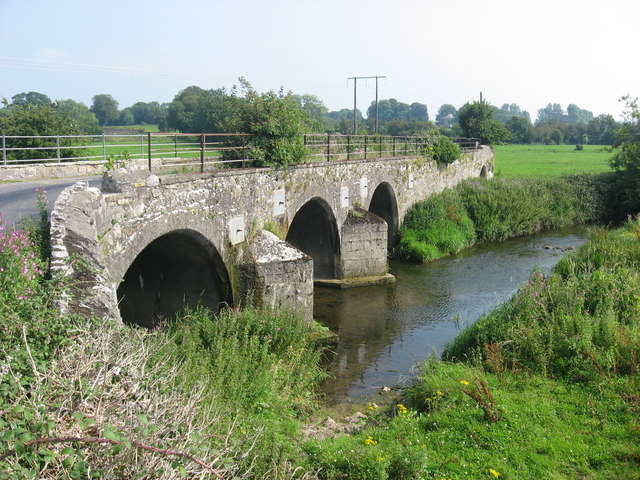
Bridge at Boolies, Duleek

Duleek railway station was opened on 1 August 1850, as part of the line from Drogheda to Navan (and later to Oldcastle). It closed on 1 June 1958. Zinc ore trains from Tara Mines to Dublin Port continue to pass through the station.

=== Road ===
Duleek is on the R150 and R152 regional roads. Bus Éireann regional routes serve Duleek from Dublin and Drogheda.

== Notable people ==
- Keane Barry, darts player, is from the village
- Sir William Bathe of Athcarne Castle (died 1597), is commemorated by the Dowdall Cross in Duleek
- Kate Kennedy, women's rights advocate, was born locally
- Mick McGowan, darts player, is from Duleek
- Frederick Smith, recipient of the Victoria Cross, lived in the area in later life

== See also ==
- List of towns and villages in Ireland
