= R151 road =

R151 road may refer to:

- R151 road (Ireland)
- R151 (Bangladesh)
