= Synod of Kells =

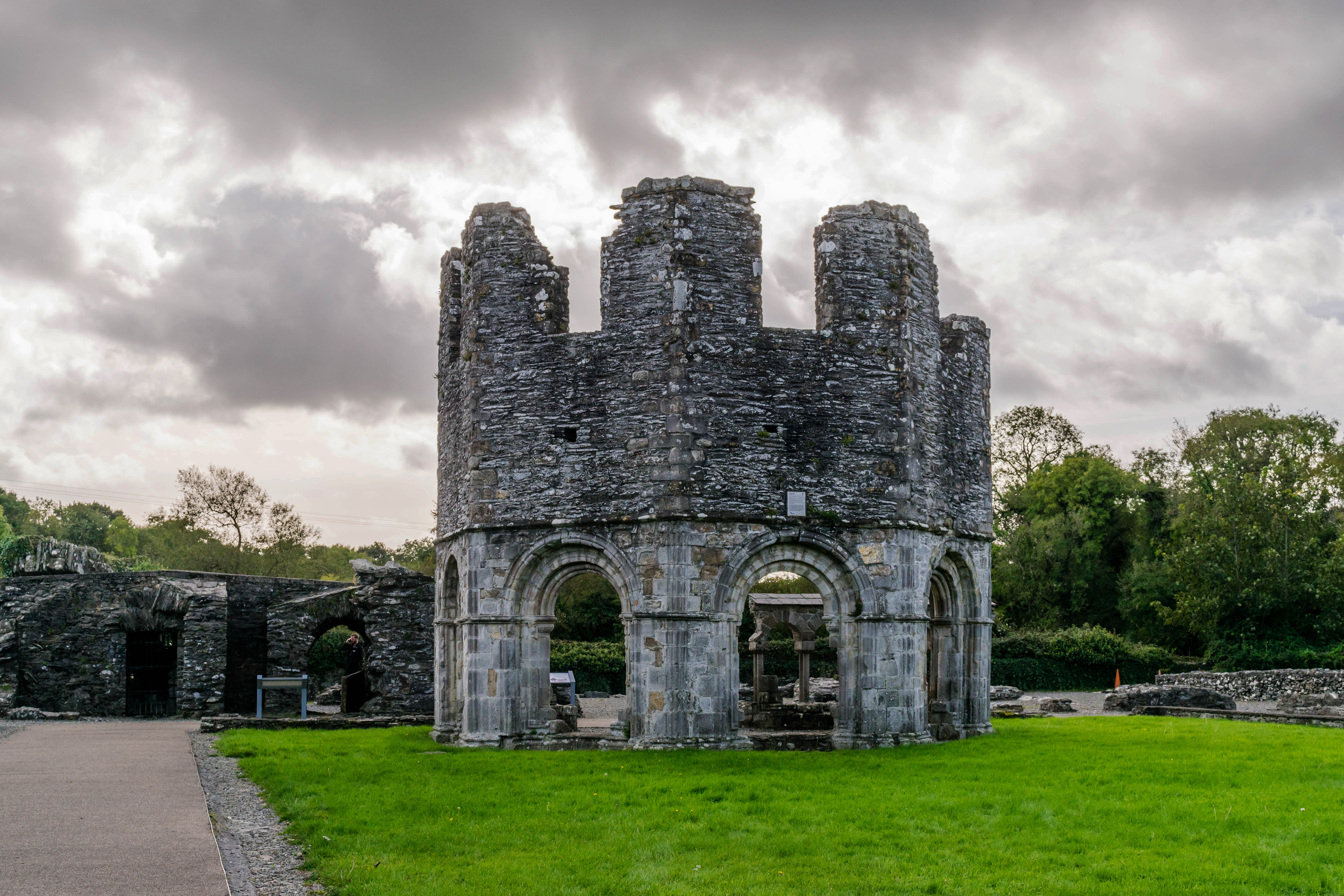
Building of Old Mellifont Abbey where part of the Synod took place.

The Synod of Kells (Irish: Sionad Cheanannais, Latin: Kenana Synodus) took place in 1152, under the presidency of Giovanni Cardinal Paparoni, and continued the process begun at the Synod of Ráth Breasail (1111) of reforming the Irish church. The sessions were divided between the abbeys of Kells and Mellifont, and in later times the synod has been called the Synod of Kells-Mellifont and the Synod of Mellifont-Kells.

Its main effect was to increase the number of archbishops from two to four, and to redefine the number and size of dioceses. The Primacy of Ireland was granted to the Archdiocese of Armagh.

== Background ==
Máel Máedóc Ua Morgair (Saint Malachy) was made a priest in 1119, as vicar to Celsus. His first sees were Down and Connor, and he was located at Bangor Abbey. On the death of Celsus in 1129, Malachy was nominated as his successor at Armagh, now the prime see in Ireland. An internal church dispute over the succession and proposals for reform obliged him to concede the position to Gelasius. In 1137, Gelasius, lacking papal confirmation of the appointment of Malachy by Rome, asked him to secure the archbishop's pallium at the hands of the Pope or his legate. Malachy reached Rome, but the Pope, Innocent II, would only grant the pallia to Malachy at the request of an Irish National Synod. To facilitate this, he made Malachy his papal legate. Malachy then returned to Ireland, accompanied by a number of Cistercian monks provided by St. Bernard.

== The Synod of Kells ==
In 1148 a synod of bishops was assembled at Inispatric. Malachy set out on a second journey to Rome, but died on the way at Clairvaux, France, in November. A synod was summoned to Kells in 1152. This synod approved the consecration of four archbishops. Tairrdelbach Ua Conchobair, the High King of Ireland, approved the decrees, and the pallia were conferred by the Papal Legate, Giovanni Cardinal Paparoni (also known as John Cardinal Paparo).

Ireland was divided into thirty-six sees, and four metropolitan sees: Armagh, Cashel, Tuam, and Dublin. Armagh was granted Primacy (see Primacy of Ireland). The diocese of Dublin, ruled by the Ostmen (Hiberno-Norse), seceded from Canterbury and was united with Glendalough. Gregory, the incumbent bishop, accepted the new title and Ostman separatism came to an end.

The synod also made decrees enforcing the Gregorian Reform, including against simony and usury and for clerical celibacy.

== The diocesan system ==
The diocesan system was further reorganised, with the number of metropolitan provinces being increased from two to four, by raising the dioceses of Dublin and Tuam to archdioceses. The four provinces of Armagh, Cashel, Dublin and Tuam corresponded to the contemporary boundaries of the provinces of Ulster, Munster, Leinster and Connacht respectively.

In most cases the dioceses corresponded with the territories controlled by the Irish clans, and the clan chiefs liked to appoint family members as bishops, nuns and church officials.

The diocesan structure established by the synod largely survived until the sixteenth century, and still forms the basis of the territorial structure of both the Catholic Church and the Church of Ireland, with many of the sees now merged.

== Provinces and dioceses ==
Comthinól senaidh ac espocaib Erenn im cairdinel comurba Pedair co Drochad Atha, cor' ordaighsed araill do riaglaib and. Ro facaib didiu in cairdinel failliam gacha cuicidh a n-Erinn .i. paillium í n-Ard Macha & paillium a n-Ath Cliath, & araile a Condachtaib & annsa Mumain.
A synod was convened by the bishops of Ireland and the cardinal of St. Peter's successor at Drogheda, and they ordained certain regulations there. Then he left a pallium for each province in Ireland, that is, a pallium in Armagh and a pallium in Dublin and another in Connacht and another in Munster.

— Annals of Tigernach, entry for AD 1152

=== Province of Armagh ===
- Ardagh: reduced in size by creation of Diocese of Kells
- Armagh
- Clonard: confirmed as see for East Meath
- Connor
- Dar-Luis: status of area uncertain
- Down
- Duleek
- Kells: established as see for the Kingdom of Breifne. Absorbed by Diocese of Meath in 1211
- Louth: see moved from Clogher and area extended at the expense of Armagh. See returned to Clogher by 1192
- Maghera: see transferred to Derry in 1254
- Raphoe: created in the late 12th century subsequent to the synod

=== Province of Cashel ===
- Ardfert: lost territory to Scattery Island
- Cashel
- Cloyne: formed from part of Cork
- Cork: lost territory to Cloyne and Ross
- Emly
- Kilfenora: formed from part of Diocese of Killaloe; corresponded with the sub-kingdom of Corco Mruiad
- Killaloe: lost territory to new dioceses of Kilfenora, Roscrea and Scattery Island
- Limerick: lost territory to Scattery Island
- Lismore: formed from part of Waterford
- Roscrea: formed from part of Killaloe, only existed until the 1160s
- Ross: formed from part of Cork
- Scattery Island: formed from parts of Ardfert, Killaloe and Limerick. Incorporated into Limerick by end of 12th century
- Waterford: lost territory to create Lismore

=== Province of Dublin ===
- Dublin
- Ferns
- Glendalough: united to Dublin in 1216
- Kildare
- Kilkenny
- Leighlin

=== Province of Tuam ===
- Achonry
- Clonfert
- Killala
- Kilmacduagh
- Mayo: merged with Tuam 1209
- Roscommon moved to Elphin 1156
- Tuam
- Annaghdown was created circa 1179

== See also ==
- Synod of Ráth Breasail (1111)
- Synod of Cashel (1172)
- Gregorian Reform

== Sources ==
- Peter Galloway, The Cathedrals of Ireland, Belfast 1992
- Healy, John (1892). "Synod of Kells" . The ancient Irish church (1 ed.). London: Religious Tract Society. pp. 176–180.
- Geoffrey Keating. Foras Feasa Book I–II Geoffrey Keating. The History of Ireland Part 91 of The History of Ireland
