= Abbot of Clonard =

The Abbot of Clonard was the monastic head of Clonard Abbey, which is in modern-day County Meath, Ireland. The abbey was founded by Saint Finnian in the early sixth century. After the death of Saint Finnian, the abbots bore the title "Comarbai Finnéin" (i.e. "successor of Saint Finnian"). However, the title was ambiguous, since it may refer to the abbots of Moville, County Down, founded by Finnian nepos Fiatach (died 10 September 579/80). The abbots of Clonard were sometimes called 'coarbs of Finnian and Mo Cholmóc'. Until the early twelfth century, a few of the abbots and some others at Clonard Abbey were consecrated bishops, but this did not necessarily mean they were bishops of Clonard, since the diocese of Clonard was not established until the Synod of Rathbreasail in 1111.

== List of abbots ==
The following is a list of abbots and early monastic bishops. (Those who were consecrated bishops, but did not hold the office of coarb or abbot are indicated in italics and brackets):

- Finnian (Finnio moccu Theilduib; Finian; Fionáin), died 12 December 549/552.
- Senach, also bishop, died 31 August c.590.
- Diarmat, died 615.
- Colman moccu Theilduib (Mo Cholmóc), also bishop, died 8 February 654.
- Oisséne Foto, died 1 May 654.
- Ultán moccu Chungai, died 665.
- [? Da Beóóc (Mo Bécóc), possibly abbot of Clonard, died 689/90].
- Colman ua hEirc ('Colman hoa hOirce'), died 5 December 701.
- Dub Dúin ua Fáeláin, also bishop, died 718.
- Áelchú, died 732.
- Fiannamail mac Geirtidi, died 736.
- (Tólac mac Dúnchado, bishop, but not abbot of Clonard, died 738).
- Forindán, died 12 February 745.
- Do Dímmóc, also achorite and abbot of Kildare, died 3 March 748.
- Bécc Laitne, died 763.
- Loarn, died 765.
- Airlid, died 772.
- Góedel, died 776.
- (Fulartach, bishop, but not abbot of Clonard, died 29 March or 21 December 779).
- Dub dá Bairenn, died 787.
- Crundmáel Dromma Inesclainn, died 793.
- (Clothchú, bishop and anchorite, but not abbot of Clonard, died 796).
- Dub dá Bairenn ua Dubáin, died 805.
- Crundmáel mac Ordráin, died 820.
- Clemens, also bishop, died 826.
- Cormac mac Suibni, also bishop and scribe, died 830.
- Eógan Mainistrech, also fer léigind (i.e. Lector) of Monasterboice and abbot of Armagh, died 834.
- Comsub, also bishop and anchorite, died 858.
- Suairlech ind Eidnén mac Ciaráin, also bishop, died 4 December 870.
- Dálach mac Mácle Raitte, died 862.
- Áedán, died 19 July 882.
- Ailbrén mac Maichtig, died 884.
- Cormac, also Bishop of Duleek, died 885.
- Cú Chongelt, died 888.
- (Rumann mac Cathassiag, bishop, but not abbot of Clonard, died 921).
- Colmán mac Ailella, also bishop and scribe, and abbot of Clonmacnoise, died 926.
- Ferdomnach mac Flannacáin, died 932.
- Máel Mochta, also scribe, died 942.
- Máel Feichíne, died 944.
- Célechair mac Robartaig, also abbot of Clonmacnoise, died 954.
- [? Máenach, possibly abbot of Clonard, also fer léigind (i.e. Lector) of Armagh, and possibly abbot of Molville, died 956].
- Béccán mac Lachtáin, also bishop, died 973.
- Tuathal mac Máel Ruba (ua Dubánaig), died 993.
- Ferdomnach, died 1008.
- Fachtna, died 1011.
- Flaithbertach mac Domnaill, also abbot of Clonmacnoise, died 1014; he was the son of Domnall mac Donnchada, King of Mide (951-952), and brother of Máel Sechnaill mac Domnaill, King of Mide and High King of Ireland (980-1022).
- Domnall mac Máel Sechnaill, died 1019.
- Tuathal ua Dubánaig, also bishop, died 1028/30.
- Cellach ua Cléirchén, died 1043.
- Ferdomnach ua hInnascaig, died 1048.
- Tuathal Ua Follamain, died 1055.
- Murchad mac Flainn Ua Máel Sechlainn, also abbot of Kells in 1055, and king of Mide (according to the annals) for three nights in 1073, died 1076; he was grandson of Abbot Domnall mac Máel Sechnaill.
- Muirchertach mac Loingsig Ua Máel Sechlainn, died 1092.
- (Máel Muire Ua Dúnáin, diocesan bishop of Clonard, but not abbot of Clonard, died 24 December 1117).
- Conchobar Ua Follamain, died 1117.
- [? Gilla Crist Ua hEcháin, possibly abbot of Clonard, but probably abbot of Molville or Clooncraff, died 1136].
- Ua Follamain, died at Kells in 1150.
- [? Conchobar Dall mac Domnaill Ua Máel Sechlainn, possibly abbot of Clonard, who was blinded in 1153].

== See also ==
- Bishop of Meath
