= William Bathe =

Irish priest and music theorist

- Born: 2 April 1564; Dublin, Ireland
- Died: 17 June 1614 (aged 50); Madrid, Spain
- Occupation(s): Jesuit priest, musicologist, writer

William Bathe (2 April 1564 – 17 June 1614) was an Anglo-Irish Jesuit priest, musician and writer.

== Life ==
Born in Dublin, Bathe lived at Drumcondra Castle, County Dublin, a member of a leading Anglo-Irish family. He was the eldest surviving son of John Bathe, Chancellor of the Exchequer of Ireland, and his first wife Eleanor Preston, daughter of Jenico Preston, 3rd Viscount Gormanston and Lady Catherine Fitzgerald; his paternal grandfather was James Bathe, Chief Baron of the Irish Exchequer, whose second wife, William's grandmother, was Eleanor Burnell of Balgriffin His brother John Bathe was an Irish representative at the Royal Court in Madrid in the early 1600s. When William's father died in 1586 the family were among the biggest landowners in Dublin, although their wealth and influence notably declined in the next generation. Upon on his father's death, William inherited the family estates, but on entering the priesthood he passed them to John, the next brother in age, in 1601.

Bathe was trained as a musician and linguist at Oxford, where he wrote A Briefe Introductione to the True Art of Musicke (1584), which was revised as A Briefe Introduction to the Skill of Song (c.1596) – the first printed treatise on music in the English language. Following a long-standing family tradition, he also studied law at the Inns of Court in London. For a time he enjoyed the favor of Queen Elizabeth I, to whom he presented a harp of his own design. The Queen made him a number of grants of land, thus adding further to the extensive Bathe holdings: but royal favour ceased after 1598, when Elizabeth discovered that William had been ordained a priest. The decision of a third Bathe brother, Luke, to become a priest did nothing to restore the family to favor (under the name Father Edward, Luke became a prominent member of the Capuchin order). Apart from the religious issue, the close friendship between Hugh O'Neill, Earl of Tyrone and Sir William Warren, who married William's widowed stepmother Jenet Finglas, raised serious questions about the family's loyalty to the English Crown during O'Neill's rebellion, popularly known as the Nine Years War. William is not known to have visited Ireland after 1601.

William Bathe taught languages in Europe and wrote one of the world's first language teaching texts, Janua Linguarum (The Door of Tongues, 1611), a juxtaposition of phrases in Latin and Spanish. It proved so popular that within twenty years it had been translated into nine languages. The Moravian educator Comenius based his work Janua linguarum reserata on this text.

For a period of time Bathe was rector of the Irish College at Salamanca.

He should not be confused with his cousin Sir William Bathe of Athcarne Castle (died 1597), who was a judge of the Irish Court of Common Pleas.

== Bibliography ==
- Pulver, Jeffrey, "The English Theorists 10: William Bathe", in: The Musical Times vol. 75 (1934), pp. 900–902.
- Rainbow, Bernarr, "Bathe and his Introductions to Musicke", in: The Musical Times vol. 123 (1982), pp. 243–247.
- Nixon, Paul J., "William Bathe and His Times", in: The Musical Times vol. 124 (1983), pp. 101–102.
- Ó Mathúna, Seán P., William Bathe, S.J., 1564–1614. A Pioneer in Linguistics (Amsterdam & Philadelphia: John Benjamins, 1986).
- Karnes, Kevin C. (ed.), A Brief Introduction to the Skill of Song by William Bathe (London and New York: Routledge, 2005).
