= William Bathe (judge) =

Irish judge and landowner

Sir William Bathe (c. 1530-1597) was an Irish judge and landowner. He is commemorated by the Dowdall Cross in Duleek, County Meath, which was erected by his widow Janet (or Jennett) Dowdall in 1601. He should not be confused with his much younger cousin William Bathe of Drumcondra Castle, who was a Jesuit and noted musicologist.

William was the eldest son of John Bathe, Chief Justice of the Irish Common Pleas, and Margaret Darcy, daughter of Thomas Darcy. The Bathes were a long-established family which settled in County Meath, and had several branches in Meath and Dublin: William's branch of the family lived at Athcarne, near Duleek, which William inherited in about 1559; he built Athcarne Castle (which is now a ruin) in 1590. He also rebuilt Duleek bridge.

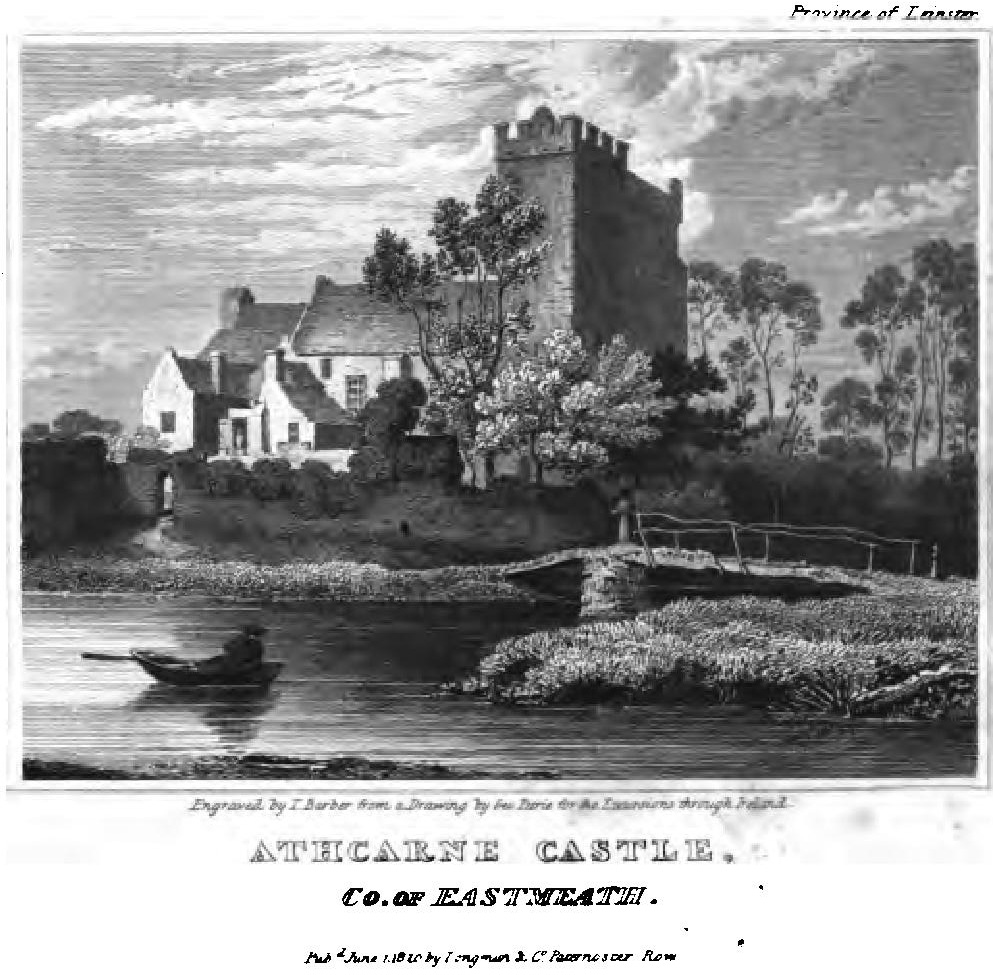
Athcarne Castle in 1820

He entered Lincoln's Inn in 1557, and was called to the Bar there in 1563. In 1562 he was one of a number of law students who wrote and presented to the English Crown a book describing what they called the "wretched condition" of English rule in the Pale. The Queen and her ministers naturally took offence at these strictures on their Irish government, and regarded those responsible for the book with suspicion; but unlike some of the other students involved, notably Henry Burnell and Richard Netterville, William was never an active opponent of the Crown. He subsequently became an office holder, and as such was required to swear the usual oath to recognise Queen Elizabeth I as head of the Church of Ireland. It is not known whether, like his cousins the Bathes of Drumcondra, at least two of whom became priests, he privately inclined to the Roman Catholic faith, although his father had been in high favour with Elizabeth's Catholic sister Queen Mary, while his wife was a cousin of the Catholic martyr James Dowdall.

He returned to Ireland before 1567, and entered the King's Inns. He was a lessee of the Inns under the new lease of 1567. There was a barrister's chambers in the Inns later called "Justice Bathe's old chamber", which may well have been William's (or possibly his father's). He was appointed Recorder of Drogheda in 1567. He was a noted authority on the law of municipal corporations. He became a judge of the Court of Common Pleas (Ireland) in 1581. He acted as the judge of assize in Ulster in 1591-2, but shortly afterwards his health declined seriously: it was said that both his judgment and his memory failed, and his work had to be done by colleagues or temporary judges, although he apparently remained on the Bench until his death in 1597. He was remembered as "a man of much distinction".

He married Janet Dowdall, daughter of Patrick Dowdall of Termonfeckin, County Louth, but had no issue, and so Athcarne passed at his death to the next eldest brother, James. The Bathe family lived at Athcarne until about 1700.

Janet in 1601 erected the impressive memorial to her husband called the Dowdall or Wayside Cross, which can still be seen in Duleek, as well as a number of other memorial crosses in the area, including one near Athcarne itself. She remarried Oliver Plunkett in the year 1600.
