= Elizabeth Charleston =

American painter

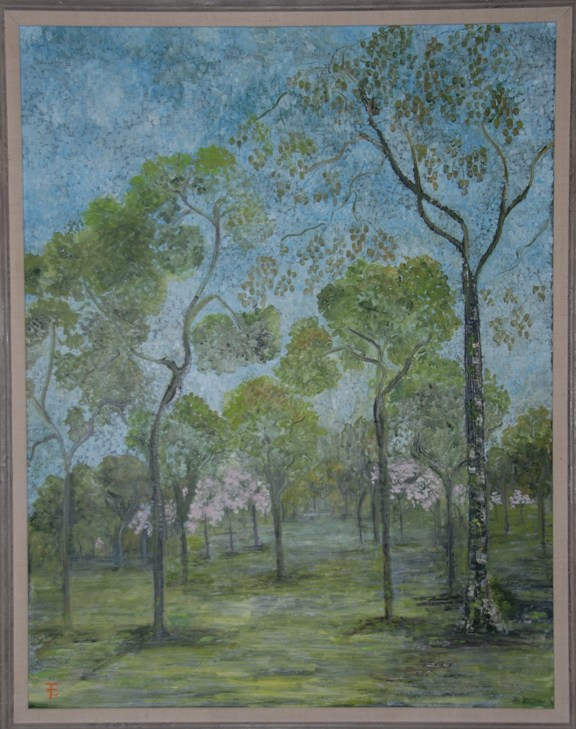
- Spring Grove
- Born: 1910; San Francisco, California
- Died: April 8, 1997 (aged 86–87); San Rafael, California
- Known for: Painting

Elizabeth Charleston's signature

Elizabeth Charleston was a San Francisco native who painted impressionist flower and landscape paintings. Charleston began painting at the age of 50, while recovering from an automobile accident.

== Life and work ==
Elizabeth Charleston was born in San Francisco, California, in 1910, shortly after the devastating San Francisco earthquake of 1906. She attended the Katherine Delmar Burke School and lived the life of a wealthy San Franciscan of the time. During her youth, she lived in France, and those memories later were reflected in her works. Her family was closely connected with the San Francisco Bay Area arts community.

At the age of 50, Charleston was in an automobile accident which limited her activities and mobility. She began painting for the first time while recovering.

The San Francisco Chronicle's late art critic Alfred Frankenstein reviewed her showing at the Pomeroy Gallery in 1968, and said Charleston had a "wonderful eye" for flowers -- "totally charming, decorative and delectable." Most of her works were impressionist oil paintings of flowers and the French countryside. Her works are available widely today, and have been shown in numerous museums and galleries in the US, Brussels, and Paris, including Hammer Galleries in NY (at least four one-woman exhibitions at Armand Hammer's famed galleries), Frank H. Boos Gallery in Bloomfield MI, Conacher Galleries in San Francisco, Salon des Femmes Peintres in Paris in 1974, the Salon exhibition at Société des Artistes Français in 1973, the US Embassy in Brussels, and at the Nationale des Beaux Arts Exposition du Tricentenaire in 1973.

Charleston is listed in Clara, the National Museum of Women in the Arts' database of women in the Arts. Charleston is popular with San Francisco Bay Area collectors, including Laura King Pfaff (chairman of Bonhams & Butterfields, the world's third largest auction house).

Charleston died on April 8, 1997, in San Rafael, California, near San Francisco.

== Gallery ==
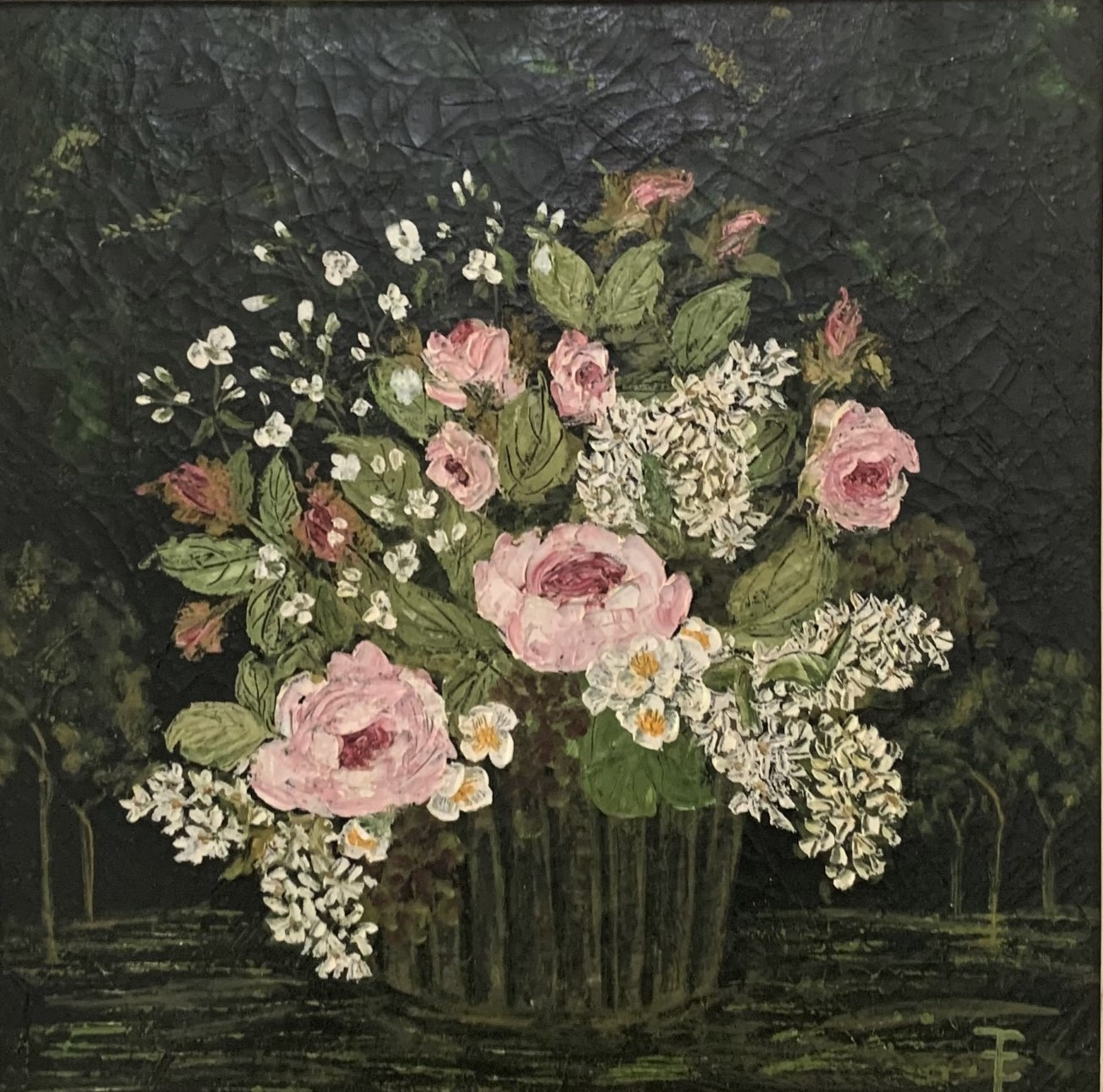
Elizabeth Charleston, Roses and Lilac, 1973
