= R153 road (Ireland) =

Road in Ireland

Coordinates: 53.634442°N 6.582595°W

R153 road
- Bóthar R153
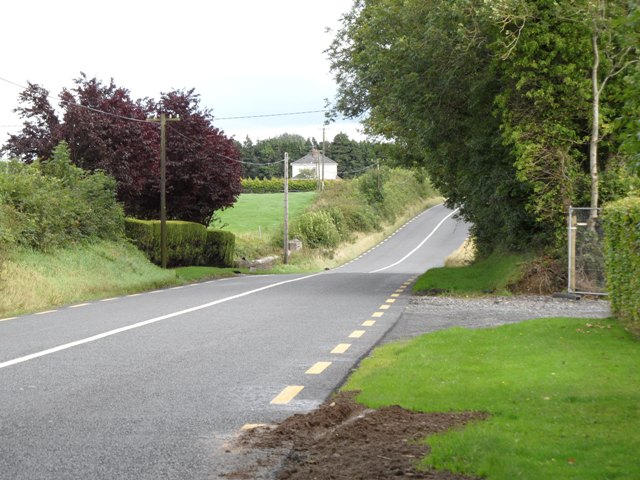
- R153 through Follistown

Route information
- Length: 8.5 km (5.3 mi)

Major junctions
- From: Navan (R161)
- Crosses River Boyne; Kentstown (R150)
- To: Balrath (N2)

Location
- Country: Ireland

Highway system
- Roads in Ireland; Motorways; Primary; Secondary; Regional

The R153 road, known as the Kentstown Road, is a regional road in Ireland, located in central County Meath.
