= Aodh Ua Beacháin =

Aodh Ua Beacháin (died 1188) was Bishop of Iniscathay in the late 12th century.

The surname is now rendered Behan
