= Athcarne Castle =

Elizabethan castle in County Meath, Ireland

Coordinates: 53.6220°N 6.4412°W

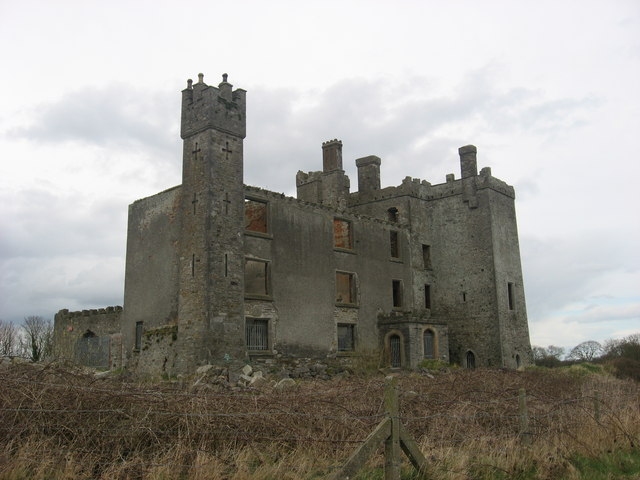
- Ruins of Athcarne Castle
- Built: 1590

National monument of Ireland
- Official name: Athcarne Castle
- Reference no.: 240

Athcarne Castle is a ruined Elizabethan castle outside the town of Duleek in County Meath, Ireland.

== Etymology ==
The name Athcarne is thought to be derived from either Áth Cairn meaning the Fording Point at the Cairn, or burial mound, or alternatively from Ard Cairn, meaning High Cairn. There is a burial mound to the southeast of the castle, across the Hurley River. Dr. Beryl Moore, the Meath historian, wrote that the castle may actually be built on top of a cairn. These cairns were built around 4,000 years ago. In 861, the Vikings raided Newgrange and Dr. Moore wrote that the Cairn(s) at Athcarne were also raided at that time.

== History ==
A location called Cerne, Cernae or Cerna in early historic times, encompassing the townlands of Carnes to the east of the ford at Athcarne, was noted as the principal burial site for the men of east Midhe and Brega (Cernoi nominatur, al. Cernai .i. coernia daiġ is ann atá primreilec Airthir Midi ocus Breaġ). This included both síd Cerna and Cnoc Cerna, the hill of Cerna, holding the bodies of the sons and grandsons of Áed Slaine mentioned in the Metrical Dindshenchus, located at the western end of the long ridge of Crockafotha and south of Duleek. The name also appears in Tochmarc Emire as part of the route south from Brú na Bóinne between Cleitech and Lusk outlined in the riddling colloquy of Cú Chulainn. The Cerna associated with a broken geas of Conaire Mór concerning the hunting of the cloen-míla Cernai (the crooked beasts of Cerne), a place located near the Slíghe Chualann in the Togail Bruidne Dá Derga, was probably located along the Boyne at Kilcarn, near Navan.

In 1172, the lands at Athcarne were granted to the Anglo-Norman knight Hugo De Bathe, who came from Bath in England. He arrived in Ireland, either with Richard "Strongbow", Earl of Pembroke in 1170 or with Hugh de Lacy, Lord of Meath in 1171. It is likely that he built a defensive structure on the site which evolved into a tower house over the next few hundred years.

It was significantly extended in 1590 by the High Court judge Sir William Bathe and his wife Janet Dowdall. On Sir William's death in 1597 it passed to his brother James Bathe, and then to James's heirs: James Bathe, who owned Athcarne in the 1640s, was probably the earlier James's grandson.

On 31 August 1649, Oliver Cromwell marched north from Dublin with 12,000 men to take Drogheda from the 'Royalists'. He captured Ballygarth Castle on the River Nanny at Julianstown, where it enters the sea. This was a strategically important point to control. On 1 September, the Earl of Ormonde issued an instruction to the Royalist troops in Drogheda to capture three other castles near the crucial crossing points on the river Nanny, and hence strategically important: they were Athcarne, Bellewstown and Dardistown. However, Cromwell's troops got there before them and captured all 3 castles on 1 and 2 September. Cromwell now controlled the river Nanny, running parallel to and south of the Boyne, where Drogheda was located.

Following its capture, Athcarne was granted to Colonel Grace, one of Cromwell's officers. James Bathe and his family then moved to Ashbourne. James Bathe died sometime before 1660. His son, Luke Bathe, continued lobbying the Crown for the return of their estates. Despite petitioning to get his lands back, under the Second Act of Settlement 1662, Athcarne, as well as many of the estates originally taken by Cromwell were transferred into the name of the Duke of York, the future King James II of England. The Bathe family never regained legal ownership of Athcarne, although they were allowed to live there: in 1668, the Duke of York allowed Sir Luke Bathe to rent Athcarne and 1,200 acres from him on a 99-year lease from 1668 for £430 in total, which was considered a "peppercorn" or nominal amount at the time. This lease expired in 1767. However, the future King kept all the other Bathe estates, Drumcondra, Glasnevin, Ballybough, Balgriffin, Clontarf, and Baldoyle, all in County Dublin, and Laudenstown in County Kildare, besides valuable other property in Dublin city and Drogheda.

Of many legends about the Castle, which is said to be haunted, the most plausible is that King James II slept here on his way to the Battle of the Boyne in 1690, the Castle being only six miles from the battlefield. In fact, James II actually owned Athcarne at the time and the Bathe family were simply renting it from him on a long lease (see paragraph above).

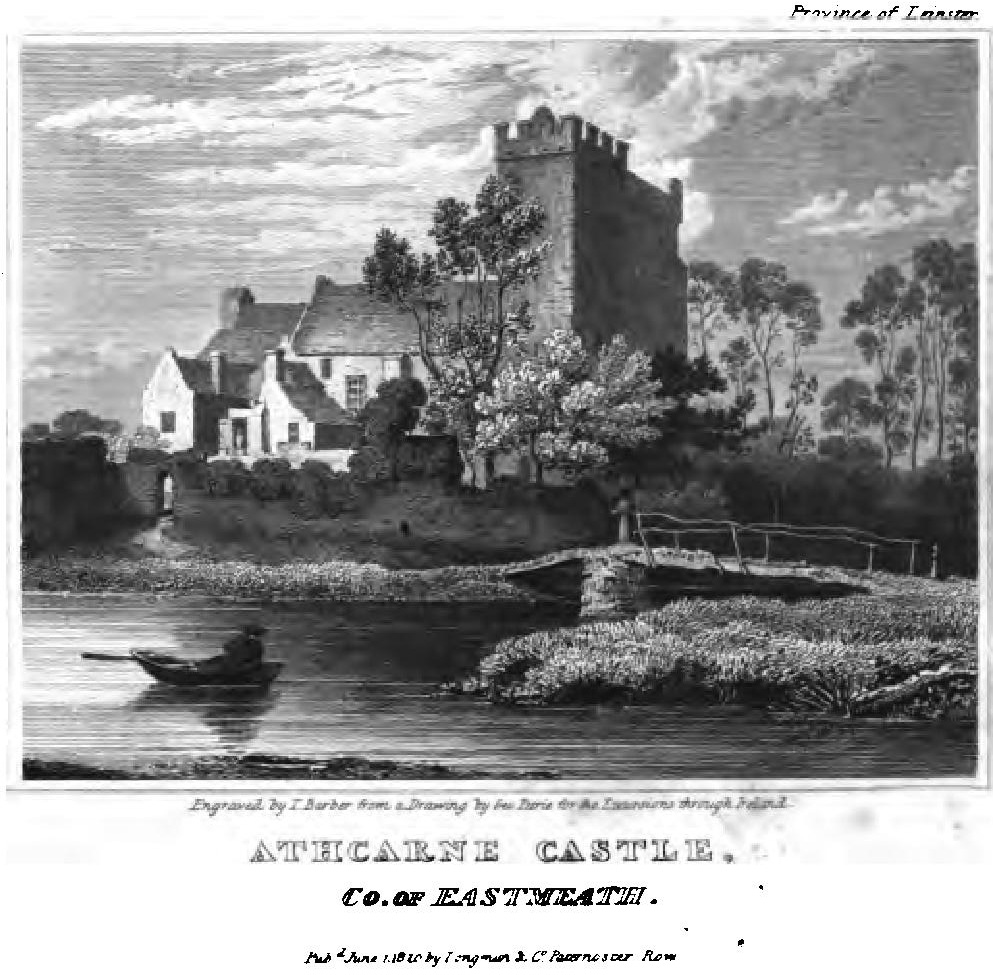
Athcarne Castle in 1820, before the rebuilding.

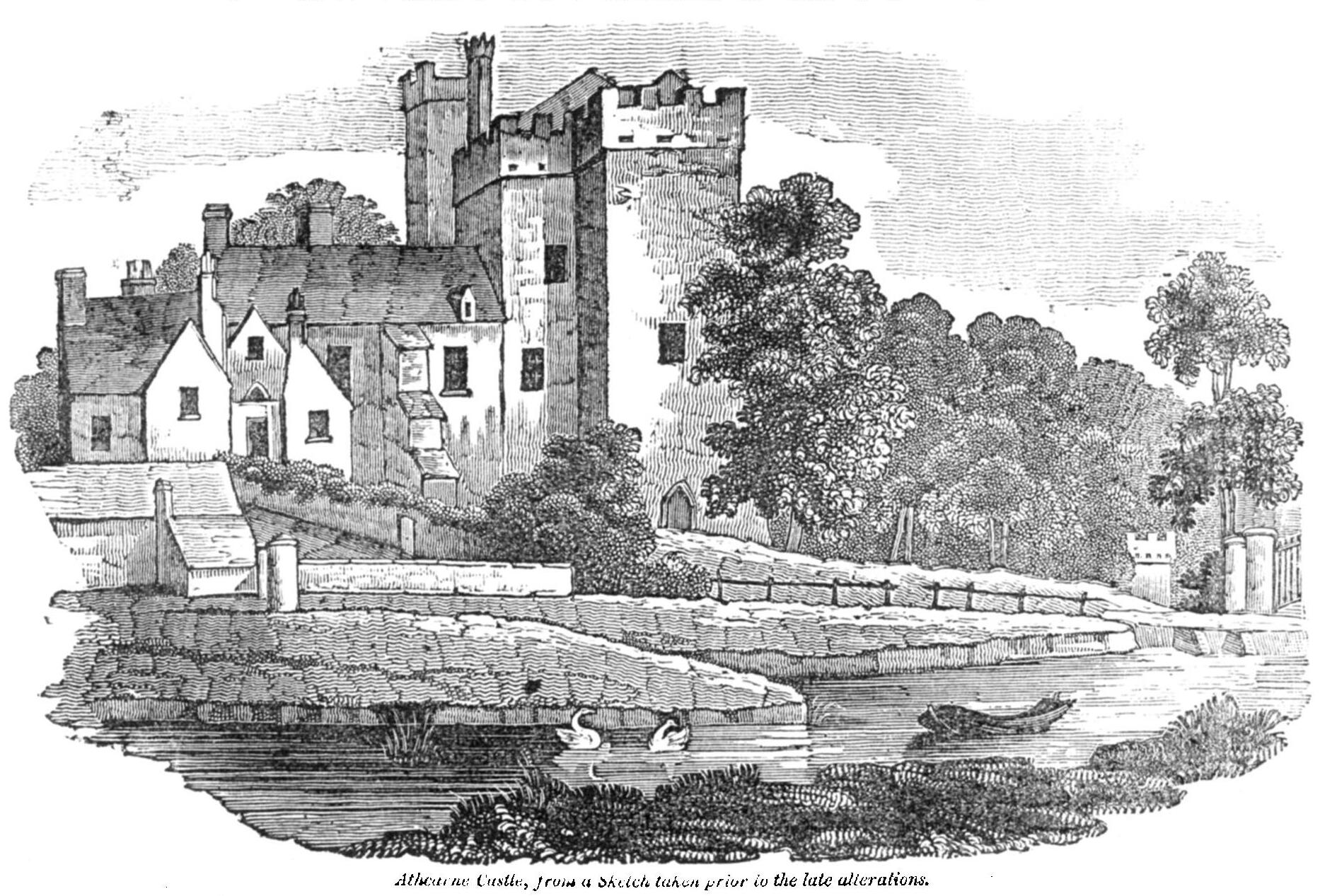
Another view, prior to alterations, Dublin Penny Journal (1832)

The Bathe family eventually left the castle about 1700 and it was owned by the Garnett family for the next 100 years or so. Around 1830, it was bought by the Gernon family who significantly remodelled it. They left the original tower house in place but demolished the Elizabethan mansion house built by William Bathe in 1590 and built a more modern extension with larger windows as was the fashion at the time. They changed the orientation so the front of the house was south-facing and created a boating lake in the field at the front of the castle. This was achieved every winter by creating a dam in the river Hurley, you can still see the dam to this day.

The Gernon family experienced a downturn in fortunes and eventually, the Castle was sold at auction in 1939. The Castle was gutted and the parts were sold off for architectural salvage. A plan to demolish the castle and use the rubble to extend roads in the area came to nothing, and eventually what remained of the Castle passed into the care of the Irish State.
