= Eochy =

Eochy (died 904) was the Irish Archdeacon of Duleek until his death in the late 12th century.
