= R150 road (Ireland) =

Road in Ireland

R150 road
- Bóthar R150
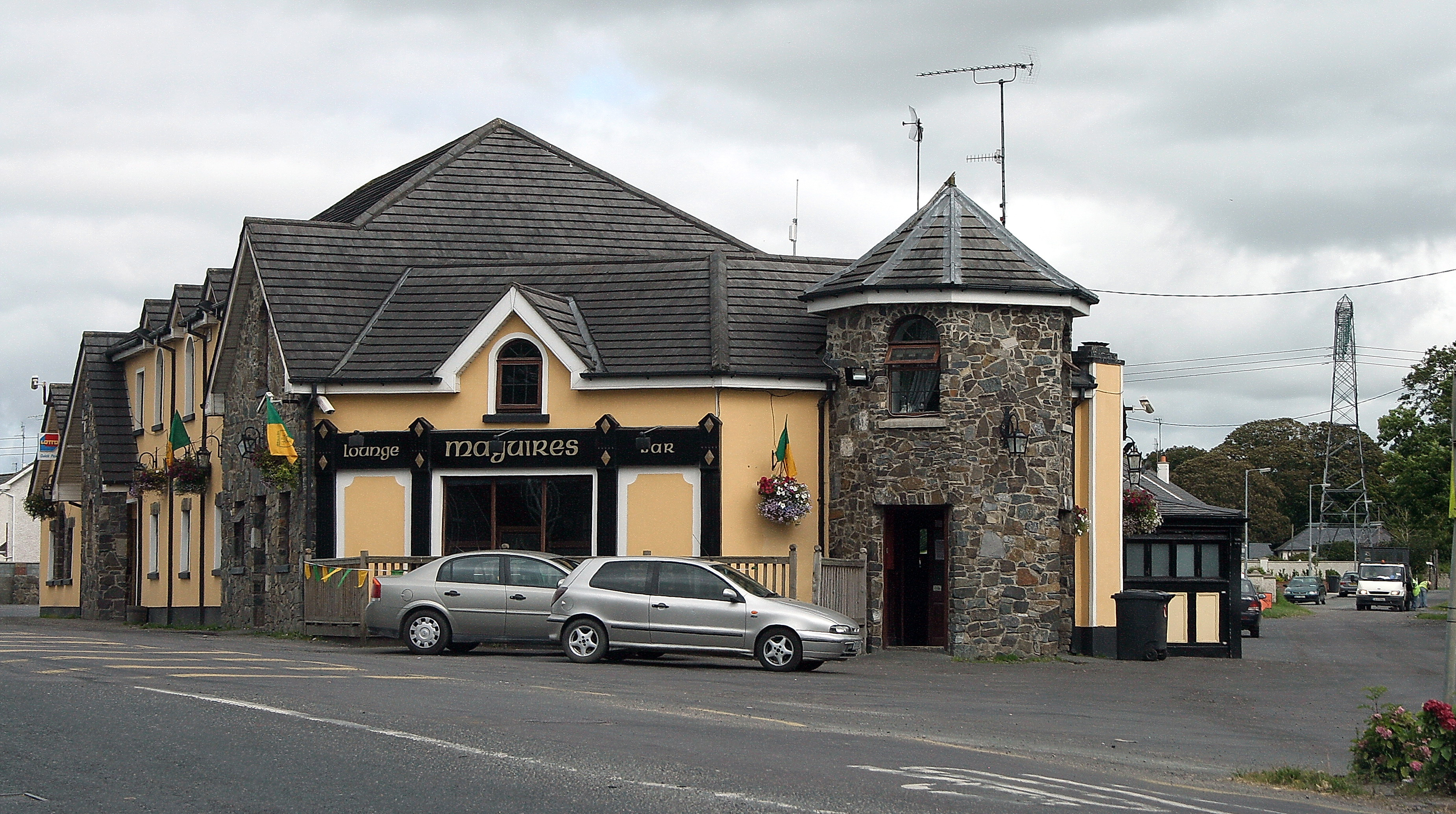
- At R153 junction in Kentstown

Route information
- Length: 33.2 km (20.6 mi)

Major junctions
- From: R167 at Drogheda, County Louth
- R151 at Mornington; R151 at Bettystown; R132 at Julianstown; R108 at Cooperhill; R152 at Duleek; N2 at Flemingstown
- To: R153 at Kentstown, County Meath

Location
- Country: Ireland

Highway system
- Roads in Ireland; Motorways; Primary; Secondary; Regional
← R149	→ R151

The R150 road is a regional road in Ireland. It runs from Drogheda to the Meath coast and back inland across east County Meath.

The R150 travels east from the Drogheda's Bull Ring to the Meath coastal towns of Bettystown and Laytown, via Mornington. From Laytown the road turns west to Julianstown and crosses the M1 (no junction) en route to Duleek. The Julianstown–Duleek section underwent a major €20 million improvement project from October 2006 to September 2008, a year longer than scheduled.

The R150 intersects with the N2 at Flemingstown before ending at the R153 at Kentstown. The R150 is 33.2 km (20.6 mi) long.

== See also ==
- Roads in Ireland
- National primary road
- National secondary road
