= Kate Kennedy (educator) =

American educator (1827–1890)

- Born: May 31, 1827; Gaskinstown (near Duleek), County Meath, Ireland
- Died: March 18, 1890 (aged 62); Oakland, California, United States
- Occupations: Principal, labor organizer, and suffragist
- Relatives: Katherine Delmar Burke (niece)

Kate Kennedy (May 31, 1827 – March 18, 1890) was an Irish immigrant who came to United States in the middle of the 19th century. She lived in California where she became a teacher and principal in San Francisco. She is most known for her "equal pay for equal work" campaign in 1874 where she successfully lobbied the California legislature to support female teachers receiving the same pay as their male counterparts.

== Biography ==
=== Early years ===
Kate Kennedy was born in the townland of Gaskinstown in County Meath, Ireland in 1827, the daughter of Thomas Kennedy, a gentleman farmer, and Eliza King. She was the middle child of six siblings; one older brother and five younger sisters. She attended a convent school in Navan until she was thirteen when her father died and the family lost their inheritance. With the family unable to send her younger sisters to school, Kennedy began teaching her younger sisters instead. Over time, Kennedy and her sisters learned French; Kennedy went on to learn German, Italian, and Spanish too.

The Great Famine of 1845–1849, forced Kennedy, one sister, and her brother to leave Ireland. They arrived in New York City in 1849, where Kennedy and her sister got a job in embroidering; her mother and other sisters joined her in 1851. After a few years in New York, the family moved to California with Kennedy arriving in 1856.

=== Teaching and Equal Pay Campaign ===
By the time Kennedy had arrived in California, her sister, Alice Kennedy, had already become a teacher for the San Francisco School Department in 1852. When Kate Kennedy arrived in 1856, she briefly taught in Suisun and took the teachers exam along with her sister Lizzie.

In the 1860s, Kennedy became principal of the North Cosmopolitan Grammar School. Typical of 19th century America, women earned less than men for the same work; in Kennedy's case she earned $100 per month, while her male counterparts earned $150. Because of this, Kennedy organized an "equal pay for equal work" campaign. The campaign focused on allowing more women into supervisory positions in public education as well as elected offices while paying them equally to men. In 1873, the California State Legislature passed legislation opening up positions for women; the following year the Legislature passed equal pay for equal work. While Kennedy benefited from the legislation, many female teachers did not; the legislation outlined both experience and education as qualifications for equal pay at a time when most women teachers did not have the same education as men, despite making up upwards of 90% of the teaching profession.

Kennedy remained a prominent figure in public education. In 1886, Kennedy ran for California Superintendent of Public Instruction, the first woman in California to run for statewide office, though she lost the election.

=== Later life ===
Following her defeat, she prepared for retirement. She traveled to Europe in 1887 and upon her return was transferred to Ocean View School. When the district transferred her, they demoted her and reduced her salary from $175 to $100. Two months into her new position, she was dismissed from the school "for political reasons."

Kennedy challenged her dismissal and sued the school district for her position and back pay, citing the California Tenure Law of 1881. The Supreme Court of California ultimately sided with Kennedy in 1890, affirming that "A teacher of any particular grade and with a proper certificate cannot be placed in a lower grade or dismissed except for misconduct or incompetency." The Court also ruled she must be reinstated in her position, which she immediately resigned from, and granted her $5,700.75.

However, she died in March 1890 before receiving her back pay. Instead, the compensation went to her estate, which used it to fund political movements Kennedy had been involved in. She was buried at Laurel Hill Cemetery.

=== Devotion to land policy reform ===
Kennedy maintained from the early 1870s until her death a keen devotion to the social perspective that the economic value of land belonged to the whole of community. She served in 1886 as Secretary of the California Land Reform League, which was devoted to the ideas of Henry George. George, a San Francisco journalist, authored Progress & Poverty in 1879, a text making the case for socializing the entirety of the market rent of land as a means of restoring collective ownership of the economic value of planet Earth. Her commitment to George's Land Value Tax is made plain in her text, "Dr. Paley's Foolish Pigeons and Short Sermons to Working Men," published posthumously by her brother Patrick in 1906.

=== Legacy ===
Her contributions to public education have been reflected in several schools named after her in the San Francisco area. Organizations like the Kate Kennedy Parent-Teachers Association and the Kate Kennedy School Women's Club also played a role in the early 20th century to promote her contributions to teachers rights and public education.
