= Katherine Delmar Burke School =

Private school in San Francisco

Coordinates: 37°47′1″N 122°29′33″W

Location
- 7070 California Street; San Francisco, San Francisco County, California 94121; United States

Information
- Type: Private
- Motto: Educate, Encourage & Empower Girls
- Established: 1908
- Founder: Katherine Delmar Burke
- Head of school: Michele Williams
- Grades: Kindergarten-Eighth grade
- Gender: Girls
- Colors: Green and Gold
- Athletics: volleyball, soccer, cross country, basketball, futsal
- Mascot: Tree
- Accreditation: CAIS, NAIS
- Newspaper: Green & Gold
- Yearbook: Works & Days
- Endowment: $31,837,000 (2022, includes restricted funds)
- Tuition: $48,580 (2025-26) (Lower School) $48,580 (2025-26)(Upper School)
- Director of Upper School: Sheena Tart-Zelvin
- Director of Lower School: Margot Zahner
- Website: http://www.burkes.org

Katherine Delmar Burke School, commonly known as Burke's, is an independent girls' school for kindergarten through eighth grade, located in the Sea Cliff neighborhood of San Francisco, California, United States, near Lincoln Park. Until 1975 it also included a high school. It was founded in 1908 by Katherine Delmar Burke and was named Miss Burke's School.

Burke's is one of three all-girl K-8 schools in San Francisco. The school is a member of the California Association of Independent Schools as well as the National Association of Independent Schools. Originally, it could have been a finishing school, but the founder Katherine Delmar Burke wanted girls to be college ready.

== History ==
The school was founded in 1908 by Katherine Delmar Burke and was named Miss Burke's School. Instead of the traditional finishing school for girls, Burke had the goal of building a school that would provide college preparation for girls.

The school's first location was at Steiner and Pacific Streets in Pacific Heights. It then relocated to a house at 2310 Broderick Street. In 1918, the growing school moved to a new building designed by architect Julia Morgan (a friend of Katherine Burke), located at 3065 Jackson Street. The school began acquiring property in Sea Cliff in 1929. At first, only the kindergarten and first grade were located there. The rest of the property was used as a sports venue for the upper classes. There was a large grass sports field, basketball courts, and 5 tennis courts. In 1949, grades 2 through 6 were moved there after the completion of new classrooms.

The high school and grades 7 and 8 remained at the Jackson St. building until 1975, when Burke's high school closed and the building was acquired by San Francisco University High School.

While once known as a finishing school where a school play made local headlines, Burke's in 2009 was cited in the Irish American newspaper the Herald that concluded, "[Burke's] innovative work of preparing young girls to attend college is an important chapter in San Francisco’s history."

== Notable alumnae ==
- Ali Wong, comedian, writer and actress
- Eileen Gu, freestyle skier
- Elizabeth Charleston, painter
- Jennifer Egan, novelist and journalist
- Marjorie Eaton, painter and actress
- Vendela Vida, novelist and editor
