= Synod of Ráth Breasail =

Irish Catholic synod in 1111

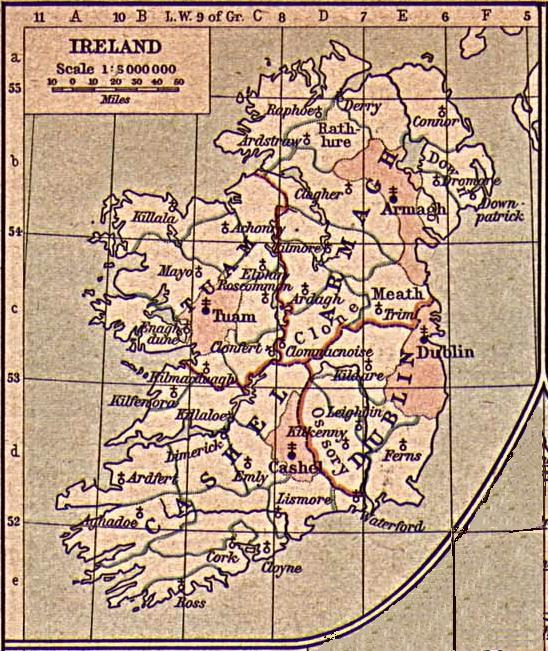
Map of dioceses in medieval Ireland

The Synod of Ráth Breasail (or Rathbreasail; Irish: Sionad Ráth Bhreasail) was a synod of the Catholic Church in Ireland that took place in Ireland in 1111. It marked the transition of the Irish church from a monastic to a diocesan and parish-based church. Many present-day Irish dioceses trace their boundaries to decisions made at the synod.

== Background ==
Viking raids on Ireland began around the start of the 9th century, and had a devastating effect on the Irish church. These disruptions, along with secular impositions by the invaders, produced a decline in Christian religious observance and the moral standards established by Saint Patrick and other early missionaries. Apathy towards these Christian teachings increased, causing many parts of Ireland to return to paganism by the 11th century, weakening Christianity's grasp on the populace.

Gradually, as the onslaughts of the Danes became less frequent, there was a revival of religious education, which prepared the way for the religious reforms of the 12th century.

== History ==
It was the second of four great reforming Irish synods; the other three were at Cashel (1101 and 1172), and Kells-Mellifont (1152). Rathbreasail is near Mountrath, County Laois, a suitably central place for such an important meeting, however, the location of the synod is not certain, and sites in counties Armagh, Laois, Tipperary and Cork have been suggested as possible locations. Ó Murchada (1999) argues in favour of a location near the townland of Clonbrassil about 4 miles southwest of Templemore, Co. Tipperary, in the present-day parish of Drom & Inch.

It was convened by the papal legate, Gille, Bishop of Limerick. Gille is not mentioned in the Irish Annals, possibly because Limerick was then a Hiberno-Norse city. Its purpose was the Romanising of the Irish Church, and, in particular, the establishment of diocesan episcopacy.

The synod was attended by no fewer than fifty bishops, three hundred priests and three thousand laymen, including King Murtough O'Brien. There were no representatives of the provinces of Connaught and Leinster, in which the Reform movement had not yet established itself. The synod's deliberations were prompted by the Gregorian Reform and guided by the relatively new powers of the Papacy as defined in Dictatus papae (1075–87) and Libertas ecclesiae (1079).

The Council established two provinces: Armagh and Cashel. Each province consisted of twelve territorial dioceses. The boundaries of the dioceses were only vaguely defined, however. The synod also made the See of Waterford a suffragan of the Archbishop of Cashel having previously been a Danish city subject to Canterbury.

The synod was called without the support of the king of Meath, Murchad mac Domnaill Ua Mael Sechlainn, which angered the king. Later the same year, Murchad backed a rival synod at Uisneach convened by the Bishop of the abbot of Clonmacnoise. At Ráth Breasail, West Meath was assigned to the Diocese of Duleek, while Uisneach assigned West Meath to a new Diocese of Clonmacnoise. The rival dioceses of Duleek and Clonmacnoise operated in parallel (although there are gaps in the records of bishops for each see) until the Synod of Kells in 1152, during which Clonard and Duleek were re-sanctioned as sees and Clonmacnoise was officially recognized by the ecclesiastical authorities.

== Dioceses established ==
The following 24 dioceses were established by the synod:

- Armagh
- Ardagh: East Connacht
- Ardstraw: territory of the Cenél nEógain (excluding Inishowen)
- Cashel
- Clogher: Approximating to Kingdom of Uí Chremthainn
- Clonard: West Meath †
- Clonfert: Territory of the Uí Maine
- Connor: Territory of the Dál nAraidi
- Cong was named as one of the five dioceses for Connacht, but no names of bishops have been recorded.
- Cork
- Down: Territory of the Dál Fiatach
- Duleek: East Meath - At the Synod of Uisneach, convened by the abbot of Clonmacnoise later in 1111, the See of Duleek was suppressed. West Meath was assigned to a new Diocese of Clonmacnoise and East Meath to Clonard. It appears, however, that a number of bishops of Duleek were appointed before 1160.
- Elphin: East Connacht
- Emly
- Ferns or Loch Garman (Wexford Haven)
- Glendalough
- Kildare
- Kilkenny (subsequently renamed Ossory): Territory of Osraige
- Killala: Territory of the Uí Fiachrach Muaidhe
- Killaloe: Territory of Uí Fiachrach Aidhne
- Leighlin: One of five dioceses for Leinster
- Limerick
- Raphoe: Tír Conaill and Inis Eogain
- Ratass: Territories of the Ciarraighe, Corco Duibne and Eóganacht Locha Léin (moved to Ardfert by 1117)
- Tuam: One of five dioceses in Connacht
- Diocese of Waterford: already in existence, but had been subject to the Archdiocese of Canterbury prior to 1111

The Diocese of Dublin acknowledged the jurisdiction of Canterbury until 1096, but was not included in the list of dioceses at the synod. It was not incorporated into the system of Irish dioceses until the Synod of Kells in 1152.

== See also ==
- Gregorian Reform
