= R152 road (Ireland) =

Road in Ireland

R152 road
- Bóthar R152
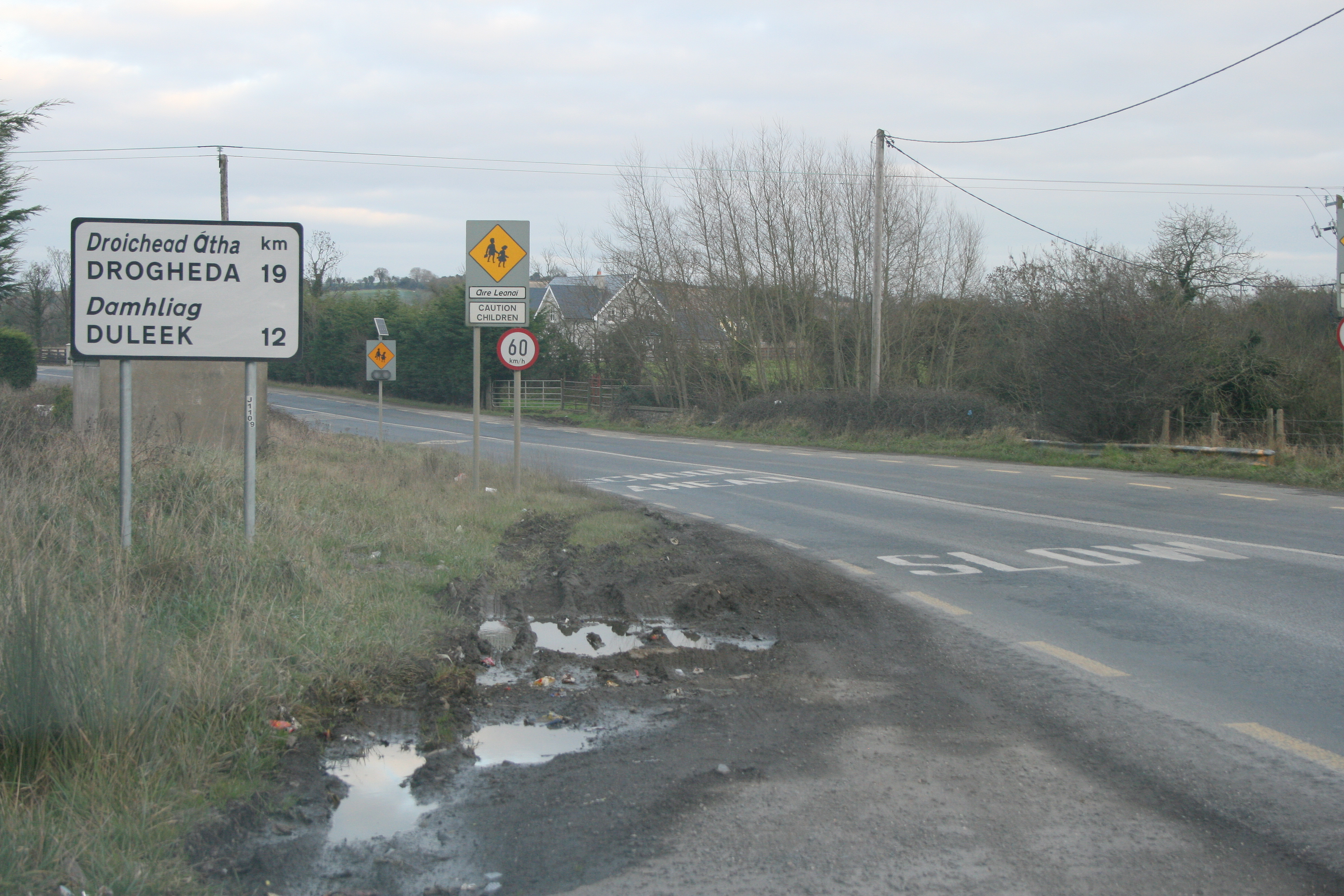
- At junction with the N2

Route information
- Length: 19 km (12 mi)

Location
- Country: Ireland
- Primary destinations: County Meath; Leaves the N2; Crosses the River Nanny; Duleek - (R150); Crosses the M1 motorway at junction 8; Terminates in Drogheda at the (R108)

Highway system
- Roads in Ireland; Motorways; Primary; Secondary; Regional

The R152 road is a regional road in Ireland, linking the N2 in County Meath to Drogheda in County Louth via the town of Duleek.

The route is 19 km (12 mi) long.

== See also ==
- Roads in Ireland
- National primary road
- National secondary road
