= Suairlech ind Eidnén mac Ciaráin =

Irish abbot and bishop

Suairlech ind Eidnén mac Ciaráin (or Suairlech) (died 4 December 870) was an Irish abbot and bishop. Little is known about him, but he is mentioned in the Annals of Inisfallen as the abbot of Bennchor. He was also known to have been Abbot of Clonard at somepoint during the 9th century.
