= Dowdall Cross =

- Crois an Dúdalaigh (Irish)
- Location within Ireland
- 53.654063°N 6.419194°W
- Type: Wayside cross
- Location: Commons, Duleek, County Meath, Ireland

History
- Built: 1601

Site notes
- Material: limestone

National monument of Ireland
- Official name: Dowdall Cross (Duleek)
- Reference no.: 440

Dowdall Cross is a wayside cross and National Monument located in County Meath, Ireland.

== Location ==
Dowdall Cross is located in Duleek, near the junction of Main Street and Abbey Road.

== Description ==
The Dowdall Cross was erected by Dame Jennet Dowdall in 1601 as a memorial to her first husband, Sir William Bathe. The cross, repaired in 1810, is one of a series of crosses constructed by Dowdall in memory of Bathe. The cross is made of limestone and is elaborately carved with images of many saints.
