= Roman Catholic Diocese of Clonard =

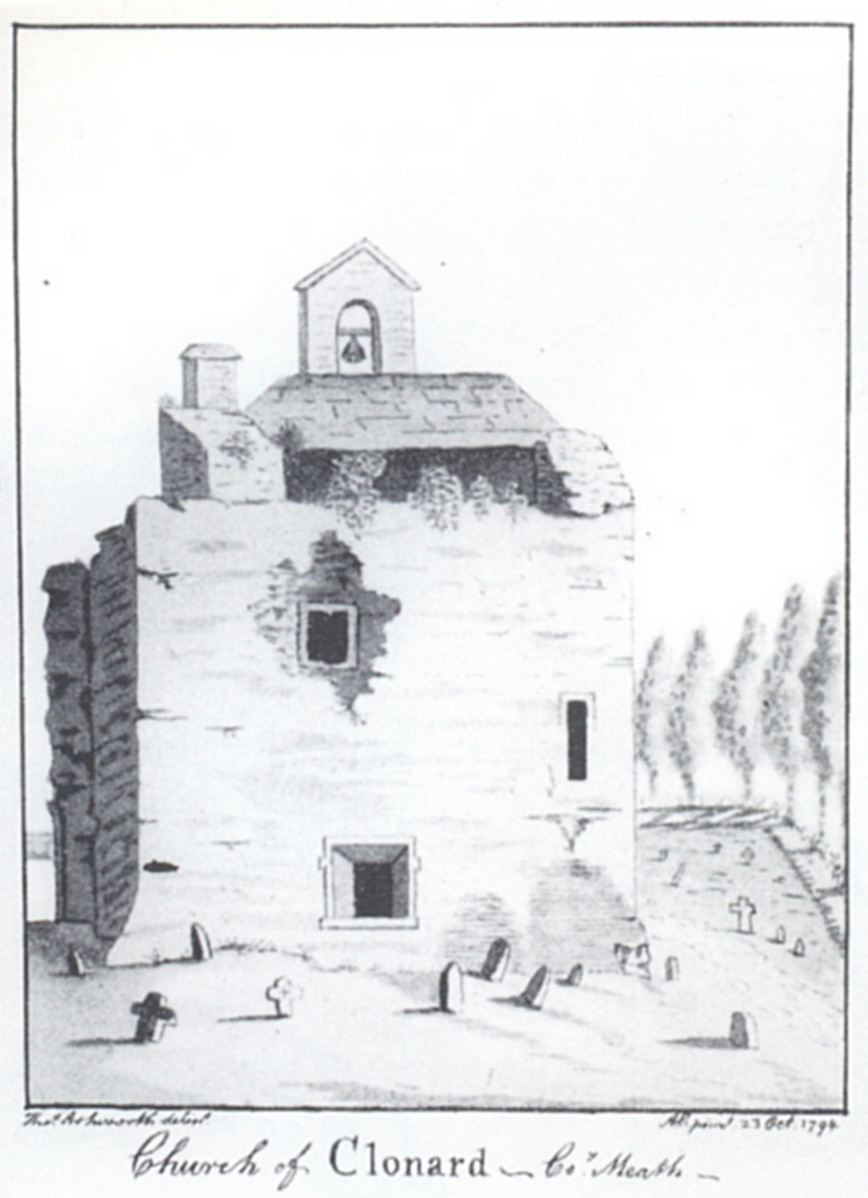
Ruins of Clonard abbey as drawn by Austin Cooper in 1794

The Roman Catholic Diocese of Clonard (English, Irish Gaelic? Cluain Iraird ) was a medieval diocese (originally abbey nullius) in Ireland until its 1202 suppression, which became a modern Latin Catholic titular see.

== History ==
The see of Clonard has its origins in the 520 established of the Abbacy nullius of Clonard, a typically Irish 'abbey-bishop', the major one of a cluster including Duleek, Trim, Kenlis (= Kells), Ardbraccan, Dunsaghlin, Slane and Foure, some of which are at least as old.

- In 1111 it was formally promoted as proper Diocese of Clonard, having gained territory from the suppressed Abbacy nullius of Dunshaughlin, when the synod of Rathbreasail chose it and Duleek (short-lived, see below) to be stabilized as regular bishoprics.
- It gained territory in 1152 from the suppressed Abbacy nullius of Trim when the synod of Kells deployed in Ireland the continental model of territorially stable diocesan sees like i cotinetal Europe, precursor of the present bishopric of Meath, as suffragans of the (now primatial) Archdiocese of Armagh
- It gained territory in 1160 from the suppressed Diocese of Duleek (cfr. supra)
- Title doubled in 1174 as Diocese of Clonard / Meath by newly elected bishop Eugene, the first to cal himself Bishop of (men of) Meath. Apparently Meath enjoyed an honorary "primatial" status amongst the suffragans in the province.
- Suppressed in 1202, its territory being reassigned to establish the persisting Roman Catholic Diocese of Meath, the episcopal see being transferred from Clonard to Trim(cfr. supra).

No residential incumbents available

== Titular see ==
In 1969 the diocese was nominally restored as Latin Titular bishopric of Cluain Iraird (Curiate Italian) / Clonard / Clonerden(sis) (Latin adjective).

It has had the following incumbents, so far of the fitting Episcopal (lowest) rank :

BIOS TO ELABORATE

- René Toussaint, O.M.I. (1970.05.21 – 1976.07.23)
- Austin Bernard Vaughan (1977.05.24 – 2000.06.26)
- Michael Francis Burbidge (2002.06.21 – 2006.06.08)
- Timothy Costelloe, S.D.B. (later Archbishop) (2007.04.30 – 2012.02.20)
- (2014.06.14 – ...): Peter John Byrne, Auxiliary Bishop of New York (USA)

== See also ==
- List of Catholic dioceses in Ireland

== Sources and external links ==
- GCatholic

Bibliography

- Henry Cotton, The Succession of the Prelates and Members of the Cathedral Bodies of Ireland. Fasti ecclesiae Hiberniae, Vol. 3, The Province of Ulster, Dublin, Hodges and Smith 1849, pp. 107–111
- lemmata 'Meath' and 'School of Clonard', in Catholic Encyclopedia, New York, Encyclopedia Press, 1913.
