= Katherine Delmar Burke =

American educator (1867–1929)

- Born: December 30, 1867; San Francisco, California, U.S.
- Died: January 10, 1929 (aged 61); Cairo, Egypt
- Relatives: Kate Kennedy (aunt)

Katherine Delmar Burke (December 30, 1867 – January 10, 1929) was an American educator and the founder of Katherine Delmar Burke School.

== Early life ==
Katherine Delmar Burke was born in 1867, in San Francisco, California, to William F. Burke and Elizabeth "Lizzie" (née Kennedy). She came from a family of schoolteachers. Her aunt Kate Kennedy, an Irish-American educator who was a pioneer of her time for women's education, was an inspiration for Burke during her early years, and an influencer of who she would become. Burke attended Girls High School in San Francisco. While still in high school, she gave tutoring lessons, which was to be the start of her teaching career.

== Career ==
Burke worked as a schoolteacher for many years. She taught at Miss Murison's School, an all-girls school in San Francisco, for several years before starting a school herself.

Burke founded Miss Burke's School (later renamed Katherine Delmar Burke School) in 1908, as a place to give college preparation to girls and young women. Its motto is to educate, encourage, and empower girls, which are the principles it was created upon. It was made as a place where girls could go to be educated, supported, and pushed to do things that other schools would not allow them to do. It was described in 1929 as "one of San Francisco’s most exclusive schools for girls."

The first graduating class of Miss Burke's, comprising only eight students, graduated in 1912. The school campus' location was changed twice in its first ten years before settling in a location on Jackson Street in the Pacific Heights neighborhood of San Francisco in 1918. It remained there until it moved to a property at Sea Cliff after Burke's death. Burke served as the Head of School of Miss Burke's from its founding in 1908 until her death in 1929.

Burke wrote a small book dedicated to her mother about the Panama-Pacific International Exposition, published in 1915. She served as the President of the American College Club of San Francisco in 1923.

== Later years ==
Burke never married. She died in Cairo in January 1929, at the age of 61.
