= Bishop of Inis Cathaigh =

Former bishopric in County Clare, Ireland

The Bishop of Inis Cathaigh (Gaelic: Inis Cathaigh was the ordinary of the Pre-Reformation Irish Catholic episcopal see based at Kilrush, County Clare, Ireland. The diocese of Iniscathay was founded by Saint Patrick. Saint Senan is the first recorded incumbent. The last recorded incumbent was Aidh O'Beachain who died in 1188, after which his diocese was portioned between Limerick, Killaloe and Ardfert.
