= Julianstown =

Village in County Meath, Ireland

Julianstown Irish: Baile Iúiliáin
- Village
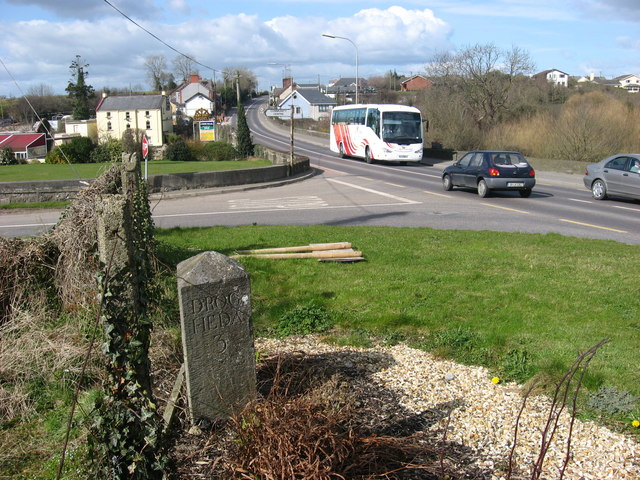
- Milestone at Julianstown on the R132

- Location in Ireland
- Coordinates: 53°40′13″N 6°16′49″W
- Country: Ireland
- Province: Leinster
- County: County Meath

Population (2016)
  - Total: 681
- Irish Grid Reference: O162714

Julianstown (Irish: Baile Iúiliáin) is a village in County Meath, Ireland. 7 km south-east of Drogheda, it is at the junction of the R132 and R150 roads. In 1641, the Battle of Julianstown was fought here during the Irish Rebellion of 1641.

== History ==
The parish of Julianstown is situated in the Barony of Lower Duleek and County Meath, and the parish is part of the Roman Catholic Union of Stamullen. Julianstown is significant in that it contains a bridge across the river Nanny on the road between Dublin and Belfast. One of the earliest mentions of Julianstown commemorates the Battle of Julianstown in 1641, which took place near the bridge. A plaque on the bridge, commemorating the battle, was erected on the bridge in the 1960s. Towards the south of the village is the smaller river Bradan (Irish: An Bradan), which flows into the sea at Mosney.

Julianstown was the seat of the Moore family who lived in Julianstown House and occupied the land that now contains the townland of Julianstown West. Taylor and Skinner's 1783 Road Map of Ireland refers to the Moore seat and also shows the Church of Ireland church which still stands today. There is little evidence of any other habitation at that time. Taylor and Skinner also show the milestone in the centre of the village marking 20 Irish miles to Dublin. There is further mention of William Moore in Lewis' Topographical Dictionary of Ireland (1837).

The Moores leased the land from Anglo-Irish landlords, including Anna Disney, the wife of Brabazon William Disney, Dean of Armagh. The land on which the present village sits was leased to Francis and Mary Thornburgh (née Moore) in 1763 by William Moore. In the lease the land was described as:

….. all that dwelling house offices orchard and garden thereunto adjoining known by the name of the Blackhorse Head Inn situate near Julianstown Bridge aforesaid together with the piece of parcel of ground opposite said house containing by common estimation 300 feet in length and 73 feet in depth more or less formerly known by the name of the Malt House bounded on the East by the Turnpike Road and on the North by the said William Moore's ground adjoining the lands called the Corroge with two cabins or tenements standing thereon all of which lands and premises are situate in the Barony of Duleek and County of Meath.

The land was further subleased to Major Charles Pepper of nearby Ballygarth Castle in 1801. In 1856, Pepper made his lease perpetual under legislation of the time, with much of the village centre being built by the Pepper family. Around 1889 the cottages in the village, known as the Swiss Cottages, were built for the estate workers. The original public house in Julianstown was called the Black Horse Inn, and was mail coach inn, where the Lime Kiln pub and restaurant are now situated.

Milling was an important part of Julianstown's heritage and history. In the 19th century, fourteen mills operated along the Nanny either flax or cornmills. The village became inhabited in the early 19th century and in 1869 a forge was established by Bartholomew Tiernan on land adjacent to the Nanny River. Some of his metalwork, commissioned for the cottages can still be seen to this day in Julianstown. In the past Julianstown had a dispensary, courthouse, telephone exchange, a shop, a quarry, a lime kiln and a Garda barracks.

== Local legends ==
The history of east Meath and Julianstown, is very much interwoven with that of St Patrick who is reputed to have put a curse on the river Nanny, for which reason no salmon are found in the river. Tradition also has it that the saint made his first convert, who was named Benignus, now Benignus of Armagh, in Mosney Wood, using water from a nearby well to baptise him.

Located within the parish of Julianstown, about 3 kilometres outside of the village, near where the Nanny enters the sea, there is a bee-hive shaped tumulus on the north bank, locally known as Laogh's Tomb.

== Education ==
Julianstown has one primary school, Whitecross National School, founded in 1826 (Irish: Scoil Cros Bán). As of August 2019, a new "state-of-the-art" building was being constructed, with the 1980s extensions being demolished. As of 2021, these renovations had been completed and the renovated school was officially opened by Bishop Tom Deenihan on 18 November 2023.

== Demographics ==
Julianstown/Whitecross was a census town in County Meath, comprising the adjoining villages of Julianstown and Whitecross. It had a population of 422 at the 2002 census. By 2011 this had grown to 616. For the 2016 census the census town name changed to only Julianstown (although the boundary still incorporated Whitecross), and its population to 681.

== Churches, crosses, and holy wells ==
The Keenogue cross is an interesting portion of a 15th-century cross, whose original site is unknown. The shaft of the cross is carved on each of its four sides, framing at the bottom, the Crucifixion, Mary embracing the dead Christ, St Lawrence, and St James.

Whitecross is the name of the townland within Julianstown, where the school is located, and derives its name from what was most likely a termon or boundary cross. It has since been destroyed.

St Patrick's Well is a small natural spring just east of the railway embankment, roughly 100 metres south of Mosney station. St Columcille's Well is situated in Calliaghstown and is attributed the cure of warts and sores. There is a small statue surmounting the well, and it dates from the 14th century, and is carved from oolite stone brought from England.

== See also ==
- List of towns and villages in Ireland

== Gallery ==
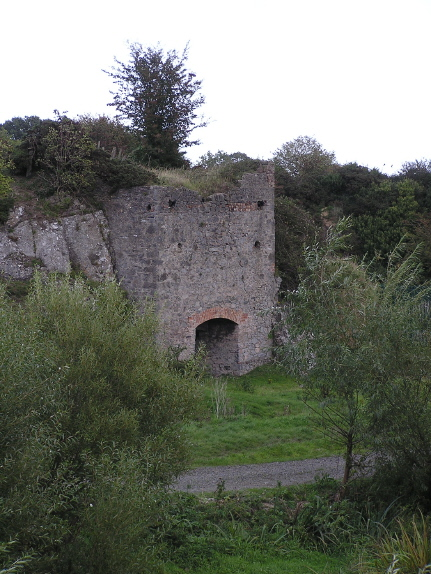
An old lime kiln near the town.

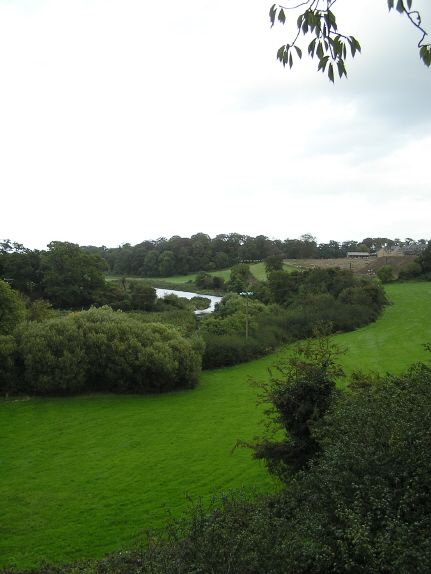
View of the River Nanny

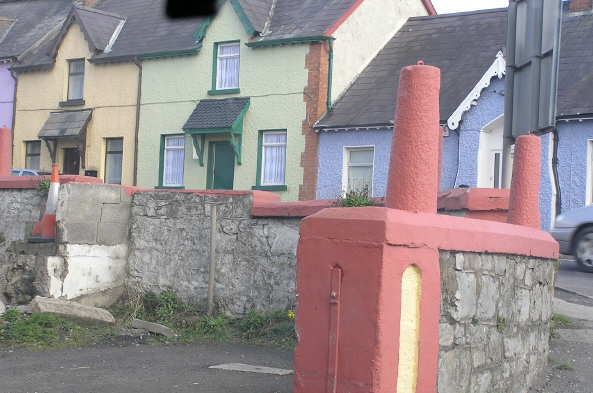
Brightly painted houses in Julianstown

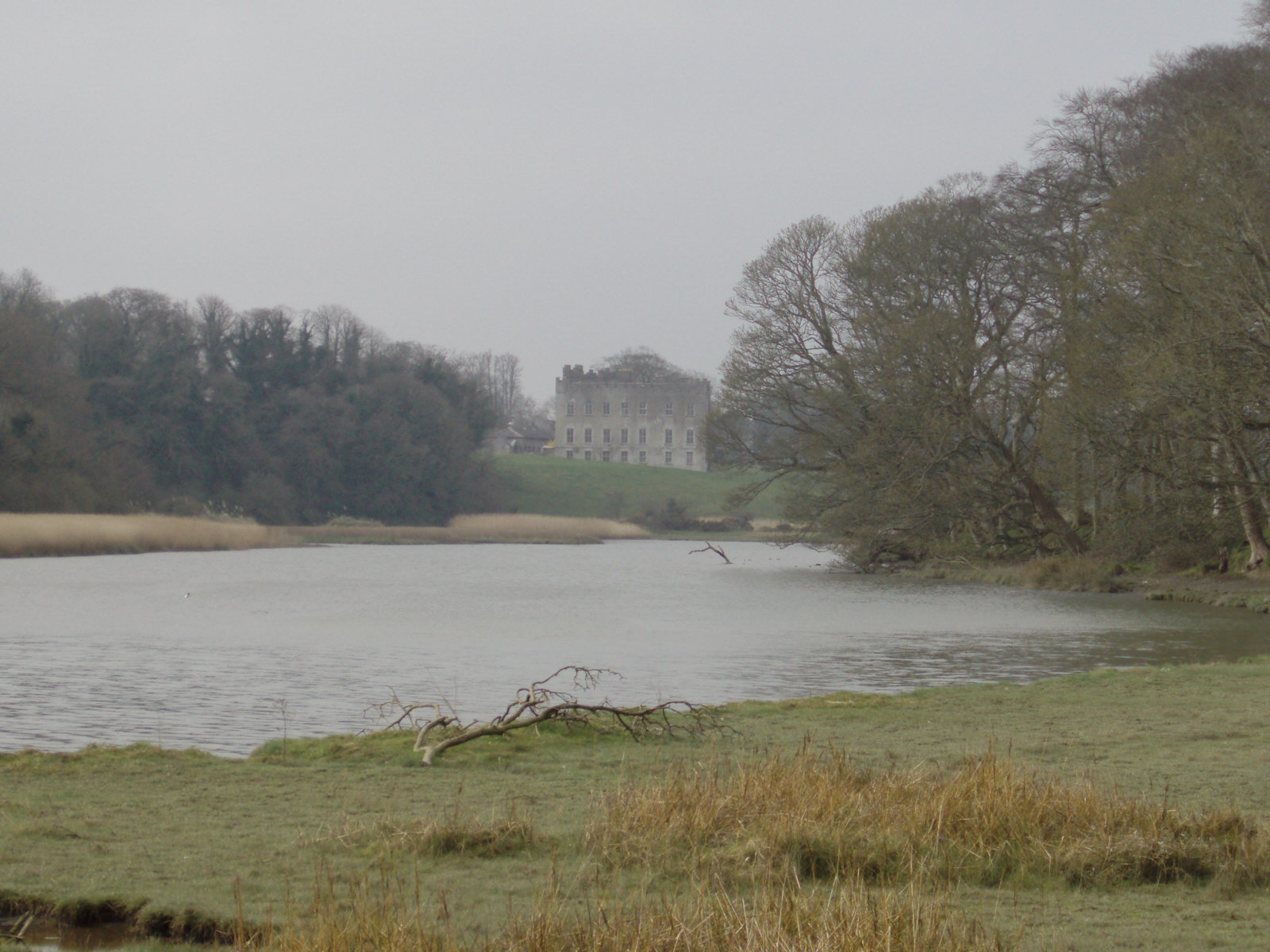
Ballygarth Castle

River Nanny from Sonairte

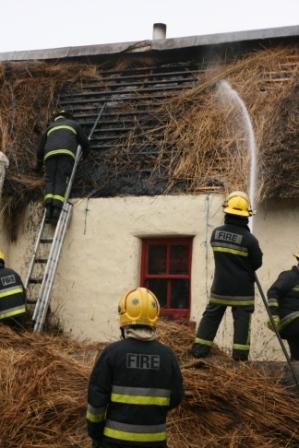
Julianstown Inn Fire

Julianstown Inn Fire

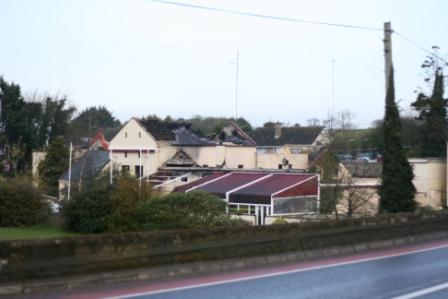
Old Mill Hotel gutted by fire

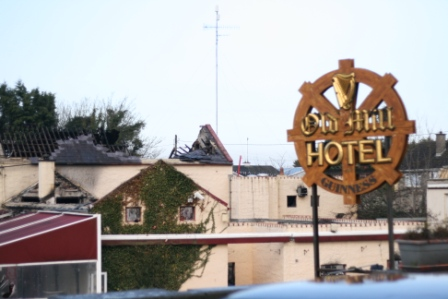
Old Mill Hotel gutted by fire
