= Diocese of Meath =

Diocese in Ireland

The Diocese of Meath (Irish: Deoise na Mí) is an Irish diocese which took its name after the ancient Kingdom of Meath. In the Roman Catholic Church it still exists as a separate diocese, but in the Church of Ireland it has been united with other dioceses.

== History ==
Clonard Abbey was founded by Saint Finnian, first Abbot of Clonard, in the early sixth century. There had been a number monastic bishops at the abbey, but it was not until the Synod of Rathbreasail in 1111 that the diocese of Clonard was established. Its boundaries were set at the Synod of Kells in 1152, which covered roughly the western part of the Kingdom of Meath with the diocesan bishop's seat (cathedra) located at Clonard Abbey. During the twelfth century the bishops of Clonard frequently used the title "bishop of Meath" or "bishop of the men of Meath" meaning the original centre of the Kingdom of Meath in Westmeath. Clonard acquired most of Magh Breagh (what is now the county of Meath) by absorbing the diocese of Duleek later in the twelfth century. After Bishop Simon Rochfort transferred his seat from Clonard to Trim in 1202, the title "bishop of Meath" became the normal style. The former seat of the diocese of Breifne or the Uí Briuin at Kells was absorbed into Meath in 1211, but that diocese remained extant among the Uí Briúin Bréifne, becoming the diocese of Kilmore.

Following the Reformation, there are two parallel apostolic successions.

=== Church of Ireland diocese ===
In the Church of Ireland, the diocese of Meath united with Clonmacnoise in 1569, although only the single name of Meath to be continued. In 1976, the diocese of Meath was transferred from the Province of Armagh to Dublin. At the same time the diocese of Kildare was separated from Dublin and Glendalough and the new Diocese of Meath and Kildare was formed. The bishop has two seats: Trim Cathedral and Kildare Cathedral. The current Church of Ireland bishop is Pat Storey, Bishop of Meath and Kildare, who was elected in 2013.

=== Roman Catholic diocese ===
In the Roman Catholic Church, Meath is still a separate diocese. The Roman Catholic bishop's seat is located at Christ the King Cathedral, Mullingar. The current bishop is Thomas Deenihan, Bishop of the Roman Catholic Diocese of Meath, who succeeded to the title on 18 June 2018.

== See also ==
- Bishop of Meath
