= Sidhe (disambiguation) =

Sidhe are Irish earthen mounds, which in Irish folklore and mythology are believed to be the home of the Aos Sí (the people of the mounds).

Sidhe may also refer to:

== Irish mythology ==
- Bean sídhe or banshee, a female spirit in Irish mythology
- Leanan sídhe, a beautiful fairy woman in Irish mythology who takes a human lover
- Cat Sidhe or Cat sìth, a fairy creature from Scottish and Irish mythology

== Other uses ==
- Sidhe (game developer), a New Zealand software developer
- a fictional race in the Heretic series of games
- Doc Sidhe and Sidhe-Devil, a pair of urban fantasy novels by Aaron Allston
