= R151 road (Ireland) =

Regional road in Ireland

R151 road
- Bóthar R151

Location
- Country: Ireland

Highway system
- Roads in Ireland; Motorways; Primary; Secondary; Regional

The R151 road is a regional road in Ireland. It runs from Bettystown to Mornington, in County Meath.
