= Diocese of Duleek =

The Diocese of Duleek was an Irish diocese which remained a separate bishopric at the Synod of Kells held in 1152 but disappeared not long after that date. Firstly subsumed by the Diocese of Meath and now within the Diocese of Meath and Kildare.

It began as an early Christian monastic settlement. St Patrick established the bishopric circa 450 AD.

== Bishops ==
Bishops of Duleek
From	Until	Incumbent	Notes
450	489	St Cianan	He was descended from the royal blood of the kings of Munster. His feast day is 24 November
unknown	778	Feargus	
unknown	870	Gnia	"Abbat, Scribe, Anchorite and Bishop died in his 87th year" (Archdall)
unknown	882	Cormac	"also Abbat of Clonard" ([Archdall (ibid))
unknown	902	Colman	
unknown	927	Tuathal	"Son of Oenecan"
unknown	941	Caon Combrach	
unknown	1117	Giolla Mochua	

== Other Senior Clergy ==
Archdeacons of Duleek
From	Until	Incumbent	Notes
unknown	904	Eochy	Son of Socaragusa (Archdall)
unknown	953	Aengus	Son of Moelbrighde (Archdall)
unknown	870	Mureadach	Son of M'Saergusa (Archdall)
