= List of townlands of County Meath =

Land divisions in County Meath, Ireland

This is a sortable table of the approximately 1,634 townlands in County Meath, Ireland.

Duplicate names occur where there is more than one townland with the same name in the county. Names marked in bold typeface are towns and villages, and the word Town appears for those entries in the Acres column.

== Townland list ==
Townland	Acres	Barony	Civil parish	Poor law union
Abbeyland	92	Lower Duleek	Duleek	Drogheda
Abbeyland	327	Lower Navan	Navan	Navan
Abbeyland South	120	Lower Navan	Navan	Navan
Abelstown	202	Upper Slane	Gernonstown	Navan
Aclare Cottage Demesne	304	Lower Slane	Drumcondra	Ardee
Aclare House Demesne	303	Lower Slane	Drumcondra	Ardee
Adamstown	277	Lower Moyfenrath	Laracor	Trim
Addanstown	155	Upper Navan	Trim	Trim
Affollus	324	Upper Deece	Moyglare	Dunshaughlin
Aghafarnan	158	Lower Kells	Enniskeen	Kells
Aghaloaghan	58	Lower Kells	Enniskeen	Kells
Aghamore	431	Lower Kells	Kilmainham	Kells
Aghanascortan	28	Upper Moyfenrath	Killyon	Edenderry
Aghathomas	54	Upper Navan	Trim	Trim
Agher	1,168	Upper Deece	Agher	Trim
Agher	24	Upper Deece	Gallow	Trim
Agheragh	188	Lower Kells	Moybolgue	Kells
Aghnagillagh	246	Upper Moyfenrath	Clonard	Edenderry
Aghnaneane (or Hermitage)	198	Lower Kells	Moynalty	Kells
Alexander Reid	635	Skreen	Athlumney	Navan
Allcollege	56	Skreen	Kilmoon	Dunshaughlin
Allenstown Demesne	652	Lower Navan	Martry	Kells
Allerstown (or Mullaghmore)	189	Lower Navan	Ardbraccan	Navan
Altmush	105	Lower Kells	Cruicetown	Kells
Altmush	203	Morgallion	Nobber	Kells
Annagh	282	Upper Moyfenrath	Clonard	Edenderry
Annagh	850	Fore	Moylagh	Oldcastle
Annagor	296	Lower Duleek	Kilsharvan	Drogheda
Anneville (or Clonard Old)	1,256	Upper Moyfenrath	Clonard	Edenderry
Antylstown	223	Lower Navan	Donaghmore	Navan
Arch Hall	350	Morgallion	Clongill	Navan
Archdeaconry Glebe	190	Upper Kells	Kells	Kells
Archerstown	161	Ratoath	Donaghmore	Dunshaughlin
Ardagh	524	Lower Slane	Ardagh	Kells
Ardanew	414	Lower Moyfenrath	Rathmolyon	Trim
Ardbraccan	1,096	Lower Navan	Ardbraccan	Navan
Ardbrackan (or Wrightown)	258	Lower Deece	Scurlockstown	Trim
Ardcalf	504	Upper Slane	Slane	Navan
**Ardcath**	Town	Upper Duleek	Ardcath	Drogheda
Ardcath	277	Upper Duleek	Ardcath	Drogheda
Ardfrail	75	Fore	Kilbride	Oldcastle
Ardglassan	90	Upper Kells	Kilskeer	Oldcastle
Ardgreagh	569	Upper Navan	Kilcooly	Trim
Ardlonan	342	Lower Kells	Kilbeg	Kells
Ardmaghbreague	1,088	Lower Kells	Nobber	Kells
Ardmulchan	1,156	Skreen	Ardmulchan	Navan
Ardnamullan	657	Upper Moyfenrath	Clonard	Edenderry
Ardrums Great	613	Upper Deece	Rathcore	Trim
Ardrums Little	198	Upper Deece	Rathcore	Trim
Ardsallagh	665	Lower Navan	Ardsallagh	Navan
Arlonstown	199	Skreen	Killeen	Dunshaughlin
Arodstown	1,038	Upper Deece	Kilmore	Dunshaughlin
Arrigal	110	Morgallion	Nobber	Kells
**Ashbourne**	Town	Ratoath	Killegland	Dunshaughlin
Ashfield (or Screeboge)	270	Upper Moyfenrath	Clonard	Edenderry
Ashpark	340	Upper Duleek	Piercetown	Dunshaughlin
Assey	429	Lower Deece	Assey	Navan
**Athboy**	Town	Lune	Athboy	Trim
Athcarne	321	Upper Duleek	Duleek	Drogheda
Athgaine Great	322	Lower Navan	Balrathboyne	Kells
Athgaine Little	223	Upper Kells	Balrathboyne	Kells
Athlumney	592	Skreen	Athlumney	Navan
Athronan	404	Skreen	Killeen	Dunshaughlin
Athronan	75	Lower Deece	Kilmessan	Dunshaughlin
Augherskea	656	Lower Deece	Knockmark	Dunshaughlin
Baconstown	1,097	Lower Moyfenrath	Rathcore	Trim
Bailis	127	Skreen	Athlumney	Navan
Balbradagh	394	Upper Navan	Bective	Navan
Balbrigh	365	Upper Navan	Bective	Navan
Baldoyle (or Curtistown Lower)	174	Lower Deece	Kilmessan	Dunshaughlin
Balfeaghan	665	Upper Deece	Balfeaghan	Celbridge
Balfeddock	325	Upper Slane	Monknewtown	Drogheda
Balfestown	243	Ratoath	Ratoath	Dunshaughlin
Balgeen	379	Upper Duleek	Kilsharvan	Drogheda
Balgeeth	506	Upper Duleek	Ardcath	Drogheda
Balgeeth	299	Upper Kells	Burry	Kells
Balgeeth	355	Lower Deece	Assey	Navan
Balgill	248	Upper Navan	Bective	Navan
Balgree	492	Upper Kells	Kilskeer	Kells
Ballagh (or Boynehill)	92	Lower Navan	Navan	Navan
Ballaghaweary	111	Ratoath	Greenoge	Dunshaughlin
Ballaghboy (or Fordstown)	72	Upper Kells	Balrathboyne	Kells
Ballaghtalion	424	Lune	Kildalkey	Trim
Ballair	217	Lower Kells	Newtown	Kells
Ballany	452	Fore	Moylagh	Oldcastle
Ballardan Great	445	Upper Navan	Clonmacduff	Trim
Ballardan Little	114	Upper Navan	Clonmacduff	Trim
Ballasport	466	Upper Moyfenrath	Clonard	Edenderry
Ballastran	56	Upper Deece	Gallow	Trim
Ballestran	128	Upper Duleek	Stamullin	Drogheda
Ballin	227	Lower Moyfenrath	Rathmolyon	Trim
Ballina	156	Upper Moyfenrath	Killyon	Trim
Ballina (or Bective)	170	Lower Deece	Balsoon	Trim
Ballinderrin	336	Lower Moyfenrath	Rathcore	Trim
Ballinderry	239	Upper Moyfenrath	Castlerickard	Trim
Ballinderry	491	Lower Moyfenrath	Rathcore	Trim
Ballinlig	164	Upper Moyfenrath	Clonard	Edenderry
Ballinlough	206	Ratoath	Dunshaughlin	Dunshaughlin
Ballinlough	1,047	Fore	Moylagh	Oldcastle
Ballinlough Big	594	Upper Kells	Kilskeer	Kells
Ballinlough Little	526	Upper Kells	Kilskeer	Kells
Ballinrig	106	Lower Moyfenrath	Laracor	Trim
Ballinrink	964	Fore	Killeagh	Oldcastle
Ballinter	433	Lower Deece	Assey	Navan
Ballintillan	118	Lower Kells	Kilbeg	Kells
Ballintlieve	208	Lower Kells	Moynalty	Kells
Ballintoghee	125	Upper Deece	Agher	Trim
Ballintogher	287	Fore	Moylagh	Oldcastle
Ballintry	161	Dunboyne	Kilbride	Dunshaughlin
Ballinvally	575	Fore	Oldcastle	Oldcastle
**Ballivor**	Town	Lune	Killaconnigan	Trim
Ballivor	768	Lune	Killaconnigan	Trim
Balloy	384	Upper Duleek	Stamullin	Drogheda
Ballsgrove	84	Drogheda	St. Mary's	Drogheda
Ballyadams	268	Upper Moyfenrath	Killyon	Trim
Ballybatter (or Balreask New)	114	Lower Navan	Navan	Navan
Ballybeg	339	Upper Kells	Balrathboyne	Kells
Ballybin	574	Ratoath	Cookstown	Dunshaughlin
Ballybin	207	Ratoath	Ratoath	Dunshaughlin
Ballyboggan	1,236	Upper Moyfenrath	Ballyboggan	Edenderry
Ballyboy	392	Lune	Athboy	Trim
Ballyboy	330	Lune	Rathmore	Trim
Ballycarn	396	Lower Moyfenrath	Rathcore	Trim
Ballyclare	466	Upper Moyfenrath	Castlerickard	Trim
Ballydonnell	155	Upper Moyfenrath	Castlejordan	Edenderry
Ballyfallon (or Newtown)	650	Lune	Athboy	Trim
Ballyfore	153	Upper Moyfenrath	Castlejordan	Edenderry
Ballygarth	327	Upper Duleek	Ballygarth	Drogheda
Ballygortagh	297	Upper Deece	Kilmore	Dunshaughlin
Ballyhack	142	Skreen	Kilmoon	Dunshaughlin
Ballyhack	341	Ratoath	Ratoath	Dunshaughlin
Ballyhist	509	Upper Kells	Kilskeer	Kells
Ballyhoe	410	Lower Slane	Drumcondra	Ardee
Ballymacad	549	Fore	Killeagh	Oldcastle
Ballymacan	200	Upper Slane	Grangegeeth	Ardee
Ballymacarney	515	Dunboyne	Kilbride	Dunshaughlin
Ballymacolgan	173	Lower Slane	Drumcondra	Ardee
Ballymacoll	608	Dunboyne	Dunboyne	Dunshaughlin
Ballymacoll Little	301	Dunboyne	Dunboyne	Dunshaughlin
Ballymacon & Ferganstn	695	Skreen	Athlumney	Navan
Ballymad	64	Lower Duleek	Colp	Drogheda
Ballymagarvey	442	Lower Duleek	Ballymagarvey	Navan
Ballymagillin	192	Upper Deece	Moyglare	Celbridge
Ballymagillin	143	Dunboyne	Dunboyne	Dunshaughlin
Ballymaglassan	426	Ratoath	Ballymaglassan	Dunshaughlin
Ballymahon	235	Upper Moyfenrath	Castlerickard	Trim
Ballymakane	232	Lower Kells	Moynalty	Kells
Ballymore	157	Ratoath	Ratoath	Dunshaughlin
Ballymuck (or Pluckhimin)	156	Upper Duleek	Piercetown	Dunshaughlin
Ballymulmore	521	Lower Moyfenrath	Trim	Trim
Ballymurphy	230	Ratoath	Dunshaughlin	Dunshaughlin
Ballynabarny	567	Upper Moyfenrath	Clonard	Trim
Ballynaclose	143	Lower Kells	Enniskeen	Kells
Ballynacree	110	Fore	Killeagh	Oldcastle
Ballynadrimna	838	Lune	Kildalkey	Trim
Ballynafeeragh (1st Div.)	64	Upper Navan	Trim	Trim
Ballynafeeragh (2nd Div.)	13	Upper Navan	Trim	Trim
Ballynagalshy	124	Upper Moyfenrath	Castlejordan	Edenderry
Ballynagranshy	170	Fore	Killeagh	Oldcastle
Ballynakill	184	Upper Moyfenrath	Ballyboggan	Edenderry
Ballynakill	812	Lower Moyfenrath	Rathcore	Trim
Ballynalurgan	155	Morgallion	Enniskeen	Kells
Ballynamona	225	Upper Kells	Dulane	Kells
Ballynamona	240	Fore	Loughcrew	Oldcastle
Ballynamona	150	Lower Deece	Galtrim	Trim
Ballynare	25	Upper Deece	Culmullin	Dunshaughlin
Ballynaskea	1,507	Lower Moyfenrath	Rathcore	Trim
Ballynavaddog	180	Lower Deece	Balsoon	Trim
Ballynavaddog	84	Lower Deece	Trubley	Trim
Balnagon Lower	723	Upper Kells	Kilskeer	Kells
Balnagon Upper	659	Upper Kells	Kilskeer	Kells
Balrath	392	Lower Slane	Drumcondra	Ardee
Balrath	635	Lower Duleek	Piercetown	Navan
Balrath	360	Fore	Diamor	Oldcastle
Balrath	356	Lune	Athboy	Trim
Balrath Demesne	703	Upper Kells	Burry	Kells
Balrathboyne Glebe	412	Upper Kells	Balrathboyne	Kells
Balreask	525	Lower Kells	Emlagh	Kells
Balreask	406	Lower Deece	Balsoon	Trim
Balreask New (or Ballybatter)	114	Lower Navan	Navan	Navan
Balreask Old	989	Lower Navan	Navan	Navan
Balrenny	606	Upper Slane	Grangegeeth	Ardee
Balruntagh	241	Lune	Rathmore	Trim
Balsaran	124	Lower Duleek	Duleek	Drogheda
Balsaw	651	Morgallion	Kilberry	Navan
Balsitric	282	Lower Slane	Loughbrackan	Ardee
Balsoon	209	Lower Deece	Balsoon	Trim
Baltigeer	459	Upper Moyfenrath	Castlejordan	Edenderry
Baltinoran	507	Upper Moyfenrath	Castlejordan	Edenderry
Baltrasna	383	Upper Deece	Culmullin	Dunshaughlin
Baltrasna	107	Upper Deece	Kilmore	Dunshaughlin
Baltrasna	456	Ratoath	Ratoath	Dunshaughlin
Baltrasna	270	Lower Kells	Moynalty	Kells
Baltrasna	1,537	Fore	Moylagh	Oldcastle
Banestown	93	Lower Navan	Martry	Kells
Barfordstown	284	Upper Kells	Burry	Kells
Barleyhill	772	Lower Slane	Ardagh	Kells
Barnwellstown	132	Lower Slane	Killary	Ardee
Baronstown	68	Lower Deece	Knockmark	Dunshaughlin
Baronstown	61	Skreen	Skreen	Dunshaughlin
Barrockstown	269	Upper Deece	Moyglare	Celbridge
Barstown	198	Upper Deece	Culmullin	Dunshaughlin
Bartramstown	349	Upper Duleek	Ardcath	Drogheda
Basketstown	199	Lower Deece	Galtrim	Trim
Baskinagh Lower	232	Lune	Kildalkey	Trim
Baskinagh Upper	315	Lune	Kildalkey	Trim
Batestown	88	Lower Slane	Siddan	Ardee
Batterjohn	33	Lower Deece	Kiltale	Dunshaughlin
Batterstown	134	Upper Deece	Rodanstown	Celbridge
Batterstown	154	Lower Navan	Donaghmore	Navan
Batterstown	140	Lune	Killaconnigan	Trim
Batterstown	267	Lower Moyfenrath	Trim	Trim
Bawn	234	Lower Kells	Moynalty	Kells
Bawn (or Williamstown)	265	Lower Navan	Ardsallagh	Navan
Bawnbreakey	175	Lower Kells	Moybolgue	Kells
Baytown	356	Dunboyne	Kilbride	Dunshaughlin
Baytown Park	323	Dunboyne	Dunboyne	Dunshaughlin
Beaumont	31	Lower Duleek	Duleek	Drogheda
Beaumont	174	Upper Duleek	Duleek	Drogheda
Bective	521	Upper Navan	Bective	Navan
Bective (or Ballina)	170	Lower Deece	Balsoon	Trim
Bedfanstown	104	Lower Deece	Knockmark	Dunshaughlin
Beggstown	173	Dunboyne	Dunboyne	Dunshaughlin
Begsreeve	174	Lower Slane	Siddan	Ardee
Belgree	546	Dunboyne	Kilbride	Dunshaughlin
Belleek	237	Fore	Loughcrew	Oldcastle
Bellew	357	Skreen	Rathfeigh	Dunshaughlin
Bellewstown	1,276	Upper Duleek	Duleek	Drogheda
Bellewstown	298	Lower Navan	Rataine	Navan
Bellewstown	481	Lower Moyfenrath	Trim	Trim
Belpere	749	Skreen	Killeen	Dunshaughlin
Belpere	86	Skreen	Skreen	Dunshaughlin
Belshamstown	106	Ratoath	Rathregan	Dunshaughlin
Belview	280	Fore	Diamor	Oldcastle
Benjerstown	583	Lower Slane	Siddan	Ardee
Bennetstown	139	Dunboyne	Dunboyne	Dunshaughlin
Berrillstowm	381	Skreen	Trevet	Dunshaughlin
Beshellstown	223	Upper Duleek	Clonalvy	Drogheda
Betaghstown	537	Lower Duleek	Colp	Drogheda
Betaghstown	277	Lower Navan	Balrathboyne	Kells
Betaghstown	228	Lower Navan	Ardbraccan	Navan
Bey Beg	405	Lower Duleek	Colp	Drogheda
Bey More	806	Lower Duleek	Colp	Drogheda
Bigisland	34	Upper Moyfenrath	Killyon	Trim
Bigstown	453	Lower Slane	Siddan	Ardee
Billywood	491	Lower Kells	Moynalty	Kells
Birdhill	224	Lower Slane	Drumcondra	Ardee
Black Friary (1st Division)	9	Upper Navan	Trim	Trim
Black Friary (2nd Division)	278	Upper Navan	Trim	Trim
Blackcastle	149	Lower Navan	Donaghmore	Navan
Blackcastle Demesne	396	Lower Navan	Donaghmore	Navan
Blackcut	199	Lower Deece	Galtrim	Trim
Blackditch	16	Lower Duleek	Duleek	Drogheda
Blackditch	82	Upper Duleek	Duleek	Drogheda
Blackditch	158	Upper Moyfenrath	Castlerickard	Trim
Blackhall Big	417	Ratoath	Ballymaglassan	Dunshaughlin
Blackhall Little	201	Ratoath	Ballymaglassan	Dunshaughlin
Blackshade	118	Lower Moyfenrath	Killyon	Trim
Blackwater	143	Ratoath	Crickstown	Dunshaughlin
Bloomsberry	111	Upper Kells	Donaghpatrick	Kells
Bloomsberry	108	Upper Kells	Kells	Kells
Blundelstown	162	Skreen	Templekeeran	Navan
Bobsville	170	Fore	Diamor	Oldcastle
Bodeen	198	Ratoath	Kilbrew	Dunshaughlin
Bodingtown	272	Upper Duleek	Clonalvy	Drogheda
Boggan	119	Lower Kells	Moybolgue	Kells
Bogganstown	395	Lower Deece	Culmullin	Dunshaughlin
Bogganstown	211	Dunboyne	Dunboyne	Dunshaughlin
Bogstown (or Moydrum)	369	Upper Moyfenrath	Clonard	Edenderry
Boherard	229	Fore	Killallon	Oldcastle
Boherlea	237	Lower Kells	Kilmainham	Kells
**Bohermeen (Part)**	Town	Lower Navan	Martry	Kells
**Bohermeen (Part)**	Town	Lower Navan	Ardbraccan	Navan
Boltown	854	Upper Kells	Kilskeer	Kells
Bonestown	321	Ratoath	Dunshaughlin	Dunshaughlin
Bonfield	33	Lower Deece	Balsoon	Navan
Boolies	213	Dunboyne	Kilbride	Dunshaughlin
Boolies	199	Lower Kells	Burry	Kells
Boolies	234	Upper Kells	Donaghpatrick	Navan
Boolies	892	Fore	Oldcastle	Oldcastle
Boolies Great	388	Upper Duleek	Duleek	Drogheda
Boolies Little	234	Upper Duleek	Duleek	Drogheda
Boolykeagh	322	Upper Moyfenrath	Clonard	Trim
Boraheen	107	Upper Moyfenrath	Killyon	Trim
Boycetown	313	Lower Deece	Galtrim	Trim
Boyerstown	434	Lower Navan	Ardbraccan	Navan
Boynagh	171	Lower Kells	Enniskeen	Kells
Boynagh	444	Lower Kells	Kilmainham	Kells
Boynaghbought	157	Lower Kells	Enniskeen	Kells
Boynehill (or Ballagh)	92	Lower Navan	Navan	Navan
Bracetown	146	Dunboyne	Dunboyne	Dunshaughlin
Brackanraney	204	Upper Moyfenrath	Castlerickard	Trim
Bradystown	91	Ratoath	Ratoath	Dunshaughlin
Branganstown	297	Lower Deece	Galtrim	Trim
Brannanstown	268	Skreen	Kilcarn	Navan
Brannockstown	918	Lower Moyfenrath	Trim	Trim
Branstown	393	Skreen	Trevet	Dunshaughlin
Braysland	57	Lower Slane	Siddan	Ardee
Braystown	216	Lower Slane	Killary	Ardee
Braystown	179	Upper Slane	Gernonstown	Navan
Breslanstown	480	Lower Slane	Drumcondra	Ardee
Briarleas	384	Upper Duleek	Moorechurch	Drogheda
Brittas	561	Morgallion	Nobber	Kells
Brittstown	155	Upper Slane	Slane	Navan
Broad	17	Upper Navan	Trim	Trim
Broomfield	588	Upper Slane	Collon	Ardee
Brownrath	162	Ratoath	Ballymaglassan	Dunshaughlin
Brownstown	236	Lower Slane	Killary	Ardee
Brownstown	330	Ratoath	Ballymaglassan	Dunshaughlin
Brownstown	114	Ratoath	Ratoath	Dunshaughlin
Brownstown	949	Skreen	Brownstown	Navan
Brownstown	52	Lower Moyfenrath	Laracor	Trim
Bryanstown	326	Upper Deece	Moyglare	Celbridge
Bryanstown	589	Drogheda	St. Mary's	Drogheda
Bryanstown	275	Upper Slane	Slane	Navan
Bullstown	287	Ratoath	Donaghmore	Dunshaughlin
Bunboggan	132	Lune	Athboy	Trim
Bunnianstown	67	Upper Duleek	Ardcath	Drogheda
Burtonstown	473	Lower Duleek	Ballymagarvey	Navan
Butlerstown	108	Upper Deece	Moyglare	Dunshaughlin
Butlerstown	228	Morgallion	Castletown	Navan
Butterhouse (or Mountland)	107	Lower Deece	Scurlockstown	Trim
Cabinhill	206	Ratoath	Ratoath	Dunshaughlin
Cabragh	397	Upper Kells	Loughan or Castlekeeran	Kells
Cabragh	642	Skreen	Tara	Navan
Caddelstown	68	Lower Slane	Loughbrackan	Ardee
Caddelstown	43	Lower Slane	Siddan	Ardee
Cakestown Glebe	222	Upper Kells	Kells	Kells
Calgath	414	Upper Deece	Rodanstown	Celbridge
Calliaghstown	410	Lower Duleek	Kilsharvan	Drogheda
Calliaghstown	219	Upper Kells	Kells	Kells
Calliaghwee	55	Dunboyne	Dunboyne	Dunshaughlin
Cannonstown	111	Upper Kells	Kells	Kells
Cappaboggan	211	Upper Moyfenrath	Castlejordan	Edenderry
Cappaghcreen	20	Dunboyne	Dunboyne	Dunshaughlin
Capranny	113	Upper Navan	Trim	Trim
Carberrystown	345	Lower Moyfenrath	Trim	Trim
Cardrath	558	Upper Slane	Grangegeeth	Ardee
**Carlanstown**	Town	Lower Kells	Kilbeg	Kells
Carlanstown	324	Lower Kells	Kilbeg	Kells
Carnacally	299	Lower Kells	Kilmainham	Kells
Carnacop	317	Morgallion	Castletown	Navan
Carnaross	139	Upper Kells	Loughan or Castlekeeran	Kells
Carnbane	69	Fore	Loughcrew	Oldcastle
Carnelrussel	36	Upper Kells	Kilskeer	Oldcastle
Carnes East	307	Upper Duleek	Duleek	Drogheda
Carnes West	300	Upper Duleek	Duleek	Drogheda
Carnuff Great and Kingstown	561	Skreen	Ardmulchan	Navan
Carnuff Little and Haystown	1,005	Skreen	Ardmulchan	Navan
Carranstown	647	Lower Duleek	Duleek	Drogheda
Carranstown Great	564	Lune	Killaconnigan	Trim
Carranstown Little	122	Lune	Killaconnigan	Trim
Carrick	250	Upper Kells	Kilskeer	Kells
Carrickdexter	374	Upper Slane	Slane	Navan
Carrickleck	1,192	Morgallion	Enniskeen	Kells
Carrickspringan	518	Lower Kells	Moynalty	Kells
Carrigagh	356	Lower Kells	Moynalty	Kells
Cashel	298	Upper Slane	Slane	Navan
Castleboy	6	Skreen	Skreen	Dunshaughlin
Castleboy	86	Skreen	Tara	Navan
Castlecor	382	Fore	Kilbride	Oldcastle
Castlefarm	803	Dunboyne	Dunboyne	Dunshaughlin
Castlejordan	546	Upper Moyfenrath	Castlejordan	Edenderry
Castlekeeran	714	Upper Kells	Loughan or Castlekeeran	Kells
Castlemartin	408	Lower Navan	Martry	Kells
Castleparks	269	Upper Slane	Slane	Navan
Castlepole	325	Upper Kells	Loughan or Castlekeeran	Kells
Castlerickard	974	Upper Moyfenrath	Castlerickard	Trim
Castletown	780	Morgallion	Castletown	Navan
Castletown	540	Lune	Athboy	Trim
Castletown	689	Lower Moyfenrath	Rathmolyon	Trim
Castletown Kilberry	418	Morgallion	Kilberry	Navan
Castletown Tara	799	Skreen	Tara	Navan
Castletownmoor	449	Lower Kells	Staholmog	Kells
Caulstown	195	Lower Duleek	Duleek	Drogheda
Caulstown	57	Upper Duleek	Duleek	Drogheda
Caulstown	231	Dunboyne	Dunboyne	Dunshaughlin
Causetown	404	Upper Slane	Stackallan	Navan
Causetown	669	Lune	Athboy	Trim
Chamberlainstown	588	Upper Kells	Girley	Kells
Chamberstown	379	Upper Slane	Rathkenny	Navan
Chapel Land	82	Lune	Athboy	Trim
Chapelbride	213	Upper Kells	Burry	Kells
Charterschoolland	15	Lower Moyfenrath	Trim	Trim
Cheeverstown	81	Ratoath	Ratoath	Dunshaughlin
Cherryvalley	214	Lower Moyfenrath	Rathmolyon	Trim
Church Hill Glebe	66	Upper Moyfenrath	Clonard	Edenderry
Churchtown	750	Lower Navan	Churchtown	Navan
Claristown	357	Upper Duleek	Moorechurch	Drogheda
Clarkstown	236	Upper Deece	Kilmore	Dunshaughlin
Clatterstown	216	Upper Duleek	Ardcath	Drogheda
Clegarrow	462	Lower Moyfenrath	Rathcore	Trim
Clinstown	388	Upper Duleek	Stamullin	Drogheda
Cloghan	397	Upper Duleek	Ardcath	Drogheda
Clogherboy	12	Lower Navan	Navan	Navan
Clogherstown	43	Upper Duleek	Clonalvy	Drogheda
Cloghmacoo	394	Morgallion	Nobber	Kells
Cloghreagh	1,311	Morgallion	Ardagh	Kells
Clonabreany	627	Fore	Diamor	Oldcastle
Clonagara	147	Lower Kells	Newtown	Kells
Clonard Old (or Anneville)	1,256	Upper Moyfenrath	Clonard	Edenderry
Clonardran	352	Skreen	Templekeeran	Navan
Clonasillagh	318	Upper Kells	Kilskeer	Kells
Clonbartan	706	Lower Slane	Drumcondra	Ardee
Cloncarneel	1,196	Lune	Kildalkey	Trim
Cloncat	450	Upper Kells	Girley	Kells
Cloncowan	338	Lower Moyfenrath	Rathmolyon	Trim
Cloncullen	401	Upper Navan	Bective	Navan
Clondalee Beg	496	Upper Moyfenrath	Killyon	Trim
Clondalee More	1,621	Upper Moyfenrath	Killyon	Trim
Clondavan	32	Upper Navan	Moymet	Trim
Clondavan	103	Upper Navan	Trim	Trim
Clondoogan	836	Lower Moyfenrath	Laracor	Trim
**Clonee**	Town	Dunboyne	Dunboyne	Dunshaughlin
Clonee	807	Dunboyne	Dunboyne	Dunshaughlin
Clonee	468	Lower Moyfenrath	Trim	Trim
Cloneen (or Newtown)	351	Upper Moyfenrath	Killyon	Trim
Cloneens	15	Upper Navan	Trim	Trim
Clonevran	121	Fore	Killallon	Oldcastle
Cloney	225	Upper Duleek	Ardcath	Drogheda
Clonfane	366	Upper Navan	Moymet	Trim
Clonfinnan	102	Upper Kells	Dulane	Kells
Clongall	458	Upper Moyfenrath	Castlejordan	Edenderry
Clongill	1,207	Morgallion	Clongill	Navan
Clongowny	252	Fore	Killallon	Oldcastle
Clonguiffin	762	Lower Moyfenrath	Rathcore	Trim
Clongutery	107	Lower Deece	Kiltale	Dunshaughlin
Clonleasan	379	Upper Kells	Girley	Kells
Clonlusk	55	Lower Duleek	Duleek	Drogheda
Clonlyon	386	Upper Deece	Kilmore	Dunshaughlin
Clonmagaddan	264	Lower Navan	Donaghmore	Navan
Clonmahon	487	Lower Moyfenrath	Laracor	Trim
Clonmalevin	99	Lower Navan	Rataine	Navan
Clonmore	539	Lune	Kildalkey	Trim
Clonmowley	213	Lower Moyfenrath	Rathmolyon	Trim
Clonross	230	Ratoath	Dunshaughlin	Dunshaughlin
Clontail	334	Lower Slane	Mitchelstown	Ardee
Clonycavan	1,179	Lune	Killaconnigan	Trim
Clonycurry	371	Lower Moyfenrath	Rathmolyon	Trim
Clonygrange	160	Lune	Killaconnigan	Trim
Clonylogan	450	Lune	Kildalkey	Trim
Clonymeath	914	Lower Deece	Galtrim	Trim
Clonymore	516	Lune	Rathmore	Trim
Cloonagrouna	175	Upper Kells	Loughan or Castlekeeran	Kells
Clooney	472	Morgallion	Drakestown	Navan
Clowanstown	340	Skreen	Killeen	Dunshaughlin
Clowanstown	606	Skreen	Trevet	Dunshaughlin
Coalpits	116	Upper Slane	Slane	Navan
Coghalstown	589	Upper Slane	Rathkenny	Navan
Colehill (or Knockersally)	1,761	Upper Moyfenrath	Ballyboggan	Edenderry
College	416	Morgallion	Nobber	Kells
Collegeland	75	Upper Deece	Kilmore	Dunshaughlin
Colliersland North	74	Dunboyne	Dunboyne	Dunshaughlin
Colliersland South	31	Dunboyne	Dunboyne	Dunshaughlin
Collierstown	625	Upper Duleek	Duleek	Drogheda
Collierstown	309	Skreen	Skreen	Dunshaughlin
Collistown	310	Upper Deece	Kilclone	Dunshaughlin
Colp East	397	Lower Duleek	Colp	Drogheda
Colp West	309	Lower Duleek	Colp	Drogheda
Colvinstown	426	Skreen	Skreen	Dunshaughlin
Commons	1,050	Lower Duleek	Duleek	Drogheda
Commons	299	Ratoath	Ratoath	Dunshaughlin
Commons	124	Skreen	Skreen	Dunshaughlin
Commons	193	Lower Navan	Navan	Navan
Commons	234	Upper Slane	Slane	Navan
Commons (1st Division)	23	Lower Moyfenrath	Trim	Trim
Commons (2nd Division)	10	Lower Moyfenrath	Trim	Trim
Commons (3rd Division)	11	Lower Moyfenrath	Trim	Trim
Commons (4th Division)	1	Lower Moyfenrath	Trim	Trim
Commons (5th Division)	4	Lower Moyfenrath	Trim	Trim
Commons (5th Division)	15	Upper Navan	Trim	Trim
Commons (6th Division)	4	Lower Moyfenrath	Trim	Trim
Commons (7th Division)	265	Lower Moyfenrath	Trim	Trim
Commons of LLoyd	509	Upper Kells	Kells	Kells
Connellstown	306	Lower Moyfenrath	Rathcore	Trim
Cooksgrove	37	Upper Duleek	Duleek	Drogheda
Cooksland	223	Ratoath	Dunshaughlin	Dunshaughlin
Cookstown	229	Ratoath	Ballymaglassan	Dunshaughlin
Cookstown	389	Ratoath	Cookstown	Dunshaughlin
Cookstown	558	Skreen	Skreen	Dunshaughlin
Cookstown Great	578	Upper Kells	Balrathboyne	Kells
Cookstown Little	36	Upper Kells	Balrathboyne	Kells
Coolderry	468	Lower Moyfenrath	Rathmolyon	Trim
Coole	256	Lower Kells	Kilmainham	Kells
Coolfore	134	Upper Duleek	Ardcath	Drogheda
Coolfore	196	Skreen	Kilmoon	Dunshaughlin
Cooljohn	167	Lower Deece	Balsoon	Trim
Coolnahinch	303	Lower Kells	Moynalty	Kells
Coolronan	2,681	Lune	Killaconnigan	Trim
Corballis	430	Lower Slane	Siddan	Ardee
Corballis	378	Upper Duleek	Ballygarth	Drogheda
Corballis	565	Lower Duleek	Duleek	Drogheda
Corballis	93	Upper Slane	Rathkenny	Navan
Corballis	284	Skreen	Templekeeran	Navan
Corballis	678	Lune	Kildalkey	Trim
Corballis	252	Lower Moyfenrath	Rathmolyon	Trim
Corboggy	146	Lower Kells	Moynalty	Kells
Corcarra	207	Lower Kells	Moybolgue	Kells
Cordooey	104	Morgallion	Enniskeen	Kells
Corgreagh (or Killagriff)	412	Lower Kells	Moybolgue	Kells
Cormeen	253	Lower Kells	Moybolgue	Kells
Cormeen	444	Lower Kells	Moynalty	Kells
Cornacarrow	104	Lower Kells	Enniskeen	Kells
Cornahoova	369	Morgallion	Enniskeen	Kells
Cornasaus	299	Upper Kells	Dulane	Kells
Cornaville North	365	Lower Kells	Moynalty	Kells
Cornaville South	17	Lower Kells	Moynalty	Kells
Cornelstown	296	Dunboyne	Dunboyne	Dunshaughlin
Corporation-land	39	Upper Navan	Trim	Trim
Corporationland 3rd Div	118	Upper Navan	Trim	Trim
Corporationland North	45	Upper Navan	Trim	Trim
Corporationland Nth 1st	152	Upper Navan	Trim	Trim
Corporationland Nth 2nd	72	Upper Navan	Trim	Trim
Corporationland Nth 4th	39	Upper Navan	Trim	Trim
Corrakeeran	190	Lower Kells	Enniskeen	Kells
Corrananagh	105	Lower Kells	Kilmainham	Kells
Corratober	551	Morgallion	Enniskeen	Kells
Corstown	555	Lower Slane	Drumcondra	Ardee
Corstown	385	Fore	Diamor	Oldcastle
Cortown	454	Upper Kells	Balrathboyne	Kells
Court	48	Dunboyne	Kilbride	Dunshaughlin
Cradockstown	92	Dunboyne	Dunboyne	Dunshaughlin
Crakenstown	89	Ratoath	Crickstown	Dunshaughlin
Crakenstown	198	Ratoath	Kilbrew	Dunshaughlin
Crannaghtown	192	Upper Kells	Balrathboyne	Kells
Craystown (or Ennistown)	68	Lower Deece	Balsoon	Trim
Creemore	193	Ratoath	Rathregan	Dunshaughlin
Creevagh	421	Lower Slane	Siddan	Ardee
Creevagh	153	Upper Kells	Kilskeer	Oldcastle
Creewood	785	Upper Slane	Grangegeeth	Ardee
Cregg	911	Morgallion	Nobber	Kells
Creroge	377	Lower Deece	Scurlockstown	Trim
Crewbane	369	Upper Slane	Monknewtown	Drogheda
Crickstown	786	Ratoath	Crickstown	Dunshaughlin
Croboy	1,263	Upper Moyfenrath	Clonard	Edenderry
Crossakeel	933	Upper Kells	Kilskeer	Oldcastle
Crossane	167	Upper Slane	Grangegeeth	Ardee
Crossanstown	502	Lune	Killaconnigan	Trim
Crossdrum Lower	964	Fore	Killeagh	Oldcastle
Crossdrum Upper	331	Fore	Killeagh	Oldcastle
Crowpark (1st Division)	227	Upper Navan	Trim	Trim
Crowpark (2nd Division)	27	Upper Navan	Trim	Trim
Crufty	64	Lower Duleek	Kilsharvan	Drogheda
Cruicetown	1,338	Lower Kells	Cruicetown	Kells
Cruicetown	239	Upper Slane	Stackallan	Navan
Crumpstown (or Marshallstown)	354	Lower Deece	Scurlockstown	Trim
Culcommon	156	Ratoath	Culmullin	Dunshaughlin
Culcor	246	Upper Deece	Gallow	Trim
Cullen	525	Lower Duleek	Knockcommon	Navan
Cullendragh	280	Upper Deece	Culmullin	Dunshaughlin
Cullendragh	405	Fore	Killeagh	Oldcastle
Cullentry	906	Lower Moyfenrath	Rathmolyon	Trim
Culmullin	1,266	Upper Deece	Culmullin	Dunshaughlin
Cultromer	333	Upper Deece	Culmullin	Dunshaughlin
Curkeen	140	Ratoath	Ratoath	Dunshaughlin
Curleyland and Mill Land	173	Lune	Athboy	Trim
Curniaghanstown	180	Upper Slane	Stackallan	Navan
Curragh	578	Upper Kells	Dulane	Kells
Curraghdoo	98	Upper Deece	Kilmore	Listowel
Curraghtown	492	Upper Deece	Culmullin	Dunshaughlin
Curraghtown	287	Skreen	Cushinstown	Dunshaughlin
Curraghtown	232	Lower Kells	Moynalty	Kells
Curraghtown	329	Lower Navan	Ardbraccan	Navan
Curraghtown	351	Lower Duleek	Kentstown	Navan
Curraghtown	94	Lower Deece	Galtrim	Trim
Curraghwalls	185	Upper Duleek	Ardcath	Drogheda
Curtistown Lower (or Baldoyle)	174	Lower Deece	Kilmessan	Dunshaughlin
Curtistown Upper	193	Lower Deece	Kilmessan	Dunshaughlin
Cusackstown	213	Skreen	Monktown	Navan
Cushinstown	690	Skreen	Cushinstown	Dunshaughlin
Cushinstown	216	Dunboyne	Dunboyne	Dunshaughlin
Cushinstown	105	Skreen	Kilmoon	Dunshaughlin
Dalystown	524	Lower Moyfenrath	Trim	Trim
Damselstown	263	Upper Duleek	Stamullin	Drogheda
Dandiestown (or Springville)	462	Upper Kells	Burry	Kells
Danestown	1,197	Skreen	Danestown	Navan
Dangan	907	Lower Moyfenrath	Laracor	Trim
Dardistown	691	Upper Duleek	Moorechurch	Drogheda
Dardistown	129	Dunboyne	Kilbride	Dunshaughlin
Davidstown	125	Upper Duleek	Clonalvy	Drogheda
Davidstown	203	Upper Slane	Slane	Navan
Daw	87	Upper Duleek	Duleek Abbey	Drogheda
Deenes	367	Lower Duleek	Duleek	Drogheda
Deerpark	78	Lower Kells	Newtown	Kells
Demailestown	715	Morgallion	Kilberry	Navan
Denhamstown	215	Upper Duleek	Ardcath	Drogheda
Derlangan	482	Lune	Athboy	Trim
Derrinlig	131	Upper Moyfenrath	Castlerickard	Trim
Derrinlig	18	Upper Moyfenrath	Clonard	Trim
Derrinydaly	642	Lower Moyfenrath	Trim	Trim
Derrockstown	389	Ratoath	Dunshaughlin	Dunshaughlin
Derryclare	203	Lower Deece	Galtrim	Trim
Derryconor	436	Lune	Killaconnigan	Trim
Derryhinch	300	Upper Moyfenrath	Castlejordan	Edenderry
Derrypatrick	967	Lower Deece	Derrypatrick	Dunshaughlin
Derrypatrick Grange	505	Lower Deece	Derrypatrick	Dunshaughlin
Derrysheridan	101	Fore	Killeagh	Oldcastle
Dervar	528	Upper Kells	Loughan or Castlekeeran	Kells
Destinrath	200	Upper Kells	Kells	Kells
Devinstown	223	Lower Slane	Killary	Ardee
Diamor	1,322	Fore	Diamor	Oldcastle
Dillonsland	77	Lower Navan	Navan	Navan
Dimanistown East	148	Upper Duleek	Julianstown	Drogheda
Dimanistown West	133	Upper Duleek	Julianstown	Drogheda
Diralagh	299	Lower Kells	Moynalty	Kells
Doghtog	219	Ratoath	Ratoath	Dunshaughlin
Dogstown	20	Fore	Diamor	Oldcastle
Dogstown	225	Upper Kells	Kilskeer	Oldcastle
Dogstown 1st Division	33	Lower Moyfenrath	Trim	Trim
Dogstown 2nd Division	63	Lower Moyfenrath	Trim	Trim
Dogstown 3rd Division	170	Lower Moyfenrath	Trim	Trim
Dolanstown	474	Upper Deece	Rodanstown	Celbridge
Dollardstown	715	Lower Duleek	Painestown	Navan
**Donacarney**	Town	Lower Duleek	Colp	Drogheda
Donacarney Great	335	Lower Duleek	Colp	Drogheda
Donacarney Little	199	Lower Duleek	Colp	Drogheda
Donaghmore	432	Ratoath	Donaghmore	Dunshaughlin
Donaghmore	352	Lower Navan	Donaghmore	Navan
Donaghpatrick	178	Upper Kells	Donaghpatrick	Navan
Donore	478	Lower Duleek	Donore	Drogheda
Donore	463	Lower Kells	Moynalty	Kells
Donore	119	Lune	Castlerickard	Trim
Donore	703	Lune	Killaconnigan	Trim
Doolystown	418	Lower Moyfenrath	Trim	Trim
Doon	365	Lower Kells	Moybolgue	Kells
Dowdstown	546	Skreen	Dowdstown	Navan
Dowdstown	251	Morgallion	Kilshine	Navan
Dowdstown	22	Skreen	Tara	Navan
Downestown	373	Lower Duleek	Duleek	Drogheda
Dowth	1,221	Upper Slane	Dowth	Drogheda
Dowthstown	63	Morgallion	Clongill	Navan
Drakerath	925	Lower Kells	Staholmog	Kells
Drakestown	793	Morgallion	Drakestown	Navan
Dreminstown	200	Upper Slane	Rathkenny	Navan
Drewstown Great	557	Upper Kells	Girley	Kells
Drewstown Little	478	Upper Kells	Girley	Castletowndelvin
Drissoge	441	Lune	Athboy	Trim
Drumaneber	70	Lower Kells	Moynalty	Kells
Drumard	127	Lower Deece	Galtrim	Trim
Drumbaragh	862	Upper Kells	Kells	Kells
Drumbride	88	Lower Slane	Drumcondra	Ardee
Drumbulrisk	118	Lower Kells	Moybolgue	Kells
**Drumcondra**	Town	Lower Slane	Drumcondra	Ardee
Drumcondra	188	Lower Slane	Drumcondra	Ardee
Drumgill	209	Lower Slane	Loughbrackan	Ardee
Drumgill	456	Morgallion	Enniskeen	Kells
Drumgill Lower	332	Lower Slane	Drumcondra	Ardee
Drumgill Upper	99	Lower Slane	Drumcondra	Ardee
Druminiskin	306	Lower Kells	Moynalty	Kells
Druminshin	152	Lower Slane	Loughbrackan	Ardee
Drumlargan	1,276	Upper Deece	Drumlargan	Trim
Drumlayne	190	Lower Kells	Moybolgue	Kells
Drumlerry	783	Fore	Oldcastle	Oldcastle
Drumman	289	Lower Duleek	Duleek	Drogheda
Drummond	283	Upper Moyfenrath	Killyon	Trim
Drumone	64	Fore	Loughcrew	Oldcastle
Drumone	135	Fore	Moylagh	Oldcastle
Drumree	72	Lower Deece	Knockmark	Dunshaughlin
Drumsawry (or Summerbank)	809	Fore	Loughcrew	Oldcastle
Drumsillagh	86	Lower Slane	Drumcondra	Ardee
Duffsland	46	Lower Navan	Navan	Navan
Dulane	231	Upper Kells	Dulane	Kells
**Duleek**	Town	Lower Duleek	Duleek	Drogheda
**Dunboyne**	Town	Dunboyne	Dunboyne	Dunshaughlin
Dunboyne	946	Dunboyne	Dunboyne	Dunshaughlin
Duncansland	24	Lower Navan	Navan	Navan
Dunderk	112	Upper Slane	Rathkenny	Navan
Dunderry	246	Lower Navan	Churchtown	Navan
Dunganny	342	Upper Navan	Kilcooly	Trim
Dunheeda	202	Morgallion	Enniskeen	Kells
Dunleever Glebe	305	Upper Navan	Trim	Trim
Dunlough	410	Upper Navan	Bective	Navan
Dunmoe	975	Lower Navan	Dunmoe	Navan
Dunnagorran	283	Fore	Killallon	Oldcastle
Dunreagh	166	Ratoath	Donaghmore	Dunshaughlin
Dunsany	964	Skreen	Dunsany	Dunshaughlin
**Dunshaughlin**	Town	Ratoath	Dunshaughlin	Dunshaughlin
Dunshaughlin	673	Ratoath	Dunshaughlin	Dunshaughlin
Durhamstown	1,027	Lower Navan	Ardbraccan	Navan
Eden	240	Lower Kells	Kilmainham	Kells
Edengora	230	Lower Kells	Kilmainham	Kells
Edoxtown	311	Skreen	Rathfeigh	Dunshaughlin
Eightyeight Acres	156	Lune	Athboy	Trim
Elgarstown	206	Ratoath	Ratoath	Dunshaughlin
Ellickstown	219	Dunboyne	Dunboyne	Dunshaughlin
Emlagh	493	Lower Kells	Emlagh	Kells
Ennistown	132	Ratoath	Rathbeggan	Dunshaughlin
Ennistown	32	Lower Deece	Balsoon	Trim
Ennistown (or Craytown)	68	Lower Deece	Balsoon	Trim
Ervey	392	Lower Kells	Enniskeen	Kells
Ethelstown	408	Upper Kells	Burry	Kells
**Factory**	Town	Skreen	Athlumney	Navan
Faganstown	144	Upper Slane	Gernonstown	Navan
Farranadoony	128	Lower Kells	Moynalty	Kells
Farranaglogh	258	Fore	Kilbride	Oldcastle
Farranalcock	180	Lower Kells	Kilbeg	Kells
Farranderry	16	Lower Navan	Ardsallagh	Navan
Faughanhill	159	Lower Navan	Martry	Kells
Feagh	559	Lower Kells	Moynalty	Kells
Fearmore	449	Lower Moyfenrath	Trim	Trim
Febog	98	Upper Kells	Kells	Kells
Feegat	353	Upper Kells	Loughan or Castlekeeran	Kells
Fennor	240	Upper Duleek	Ardcath	Drogheda
Fennor	1,047	Lower Duleek	Fennor	Navan
Fennor Lower	750	Fore	Oldcastle	Oldcastle
Fennor Upper	624	Fore	Oldcastle	Oldcastle
Ferganstown& Ballymacon	695	Skreen	Athlumney	Navan
Ferrans	412	Upper Deece	Gallow	Trim
Ferrestown	89	Upper Deece	Rodanstown	Celbridge
Fertagh	157	Lower Kells	Moynalty	Kells
Fidorfe	241	Ratoath	Ratoath	Dunshaughlin
Fieldstown	54	Upper Slane	Slane	Navan
Finlaghtown Great	195	Lower Deece	Scurlockstown	Trim
Finlaghtown Little	127	Lower Deece	Scurlockstown	Trim
Firpark	157	Fore	Diamor	Oldcastle
Fleenstown Great	411	Ratoath	Donaghmore	Dunshaughlin
Fleenstown Little	273	Ratoath	Donaghmore	Dunshaughlin
Flemingstown	876	Lower Duleek	Kentstown	Navan
Flemingtown	272	Upper Duleek	Clonalvy	Drogheda
Flemingtown	172	Ratoath	Ratoath	Dunshaughlin
Fletcherstown	601	Morgallion	Clongill	Navan
Fodeen	5	Skreen	Tara	Navan
Folistown	196	Dunboyne	Dunboyne	Dunshaughlin
Follistown	653	Skreen	Follistown	Navan
Footstown Great	279	Lower Slane	Siddan	Ardee
Footstown Little	186	Lower Slane	Siddan	Ardee
Fordrath	200	Lune	Athboy	Trim
Fordstown	633	Upper Kells	Girley	Kells
Fordstown	278	Lower Moyfenrath	Rathmolyon	Trim
Fordstown (or Ballaghboy)	72	Upper Kells	Balrathboyne	Kells
Forkill	172	Fore	Loughcrew	Oldcastle
Formal	188	Lower Moyfenrath	Rathmolyon	Trim
Fostersfields	223	Lune	Athboy	Trim
Fostersholding	14	Upper Navan	Trim	Trim
Fosterstown	91	Lower Moyfenrath	Trim	Trim
Fourknocks	86	Upper Duleek	Stamullin	Drogheda
Fowlerstown	257	Upper Duleek	Duleek Abbey	Drogheda
Foxtown	153	Lower Deece	Galtrim	Trim
Fraine	936	Lune	Athboy	Trim
Frankstown	139	Ratoath	Kilbrew	Dunshaughlin
Freagh	262	Upper Moyfenrath	Castlerickard	Trim
Freffans Great	345	Lower Moyfenrath	Laracor	Trim
Freffans Little	616	Lower Moyfenrath	Laracor	Trim
Friarspark	11	Upper Navan	Trim	Trim
Friarspark 1st Division	23	Lower Moyfenrath	Trim	Trim
Friarspark 2nd Division	4	Lower Moyfenrath	Trim	Trim
Friarspark 4th Division	6	Lower Moyfenrath	Trim	Trim
Friarspark 5th Division	2	Lower Moyfenrath	Trim	Trim
Friarspark 6th Division	148	Lower Moyfenrath	Trim	Trim
Friaryland 3rd Division	5	Lower Moyfenrath	Trim	Trim
Fringestown	403	Morgallion	Castletown	Navan
Furzyhill	136	Upper Slane	Slane	Navan
Fyanstown	53	Upper Kells	Donaghpatrick	Kells
Fyanstown	427	Upper Kells	Kells	Kells
Gafney	168	Lower Duleek	Duleek	Drogheda
Gafney	120	Lower Duleek	Kilsharvan	Drogheda
Gafney Little	77	Upper Duleek	Duleek	Drogheda
Gainestown	373	Lower Navan	Ardbraccan	Navan
Galboystown	642	Fore	Killallon	Oldcastle
Galleastown	427	Fore	Loughcrew	Oldcastle
Gallow	846	Upper Deece	Gallow	Trim
Galmoyestown	686	Fore	Loughcrew	Oldcastle
Galtrim	274	Lower Deece	Galtrim	Trim
Garadice	941	Upper Deece	Gallow	Trim
Garballagh	665	Lower Duleek	Duleek	Drogheda
Gardenrath	190	Upper Kells	Kells	Kells
Garistown	210	Upper Kells	Burry	Kells
Garmanagh	418	Morgallion	Nobber	Kells
Garretstown	662	Skreen	Trevet	Dunshaughlin
Garrynabolie	252	Fore	Moylagh	Oldcastle
Gaskinstown	316	Lower Duleek	Duleek	Drogheda
Gaulstown	245	Lower Duleek	Duleek	Drogheda
Gaulstown	429	Upper Deece	Culmullin	Dunshaughlin
Gaulstown	135	Ratoath	Dunshaughlin	Dunshaughlin
Gaulstown	69	Skreen	Timoole	Dunshaughlin
Geehanstown	535	Fore	Killallon	Oldcastle
Gernonstown	674	Upper Slane	Gernonstown	Navan
Gerrardstown	369	Skreen	Kilcarn	Navan
Gibblockstown	205	Upper Duleek	Stamullin	Drogheda
Gibbonstown	313	Fore	Killallon	Oldcastle
Gibraltar	20	Lower Deece	Kiltale	Dunshaughlin
Gibstown	320	Upper Kells	Donaghpatrick	Navan
Gibstown Demesne	1,043	Upper Kells	Donaghpatrick	Navan
Gilbertstown	394	Lower Moyfenrath	Rathmolyon	Trim
Gilliamstown	175	Skreen	Timoole	Dunshaughlin
Gillinstown	324	Lower Duleek	Duleek	Drogheda
Gillstown	223	Upper Navan	Bective	Navan
Gillstown	266	Skreen	Templekeeran	Navan
Gillstown Great	390	Lune	Rathmore	Trim
Gillstown Little	513	Lune	Rathmore	Trim
Gilltown	485	Lower Duleek	Knockcommon	Navan
Ginnets Great	694	Lower Deece	Agher	Trim
Ginnets Little	74	Lower Deece	Agher	Trim
Girley	1,123	Upper Kells	Girley	Kells
Glack	402	Lune	Killaconnigan	Trim
Glane Great	168	Lower Deece	Knockmark	Dunshaughlin
Glane Little	74	Lower Deece	Knockmark	Dunshaughlin
Glascarn	299	Ratoath	Ratoath	Dunshaughlin
Glassallen	339	Upper Slane	Collon	Ardee
Glebe	33	Lower Slane	Siddan	Ardee
Glebe	33	Upper Slane	Dowth	Drogheda
Glebe	16	Lower Duleek	Julianstown	Drogheda
Glebe	93	Skreen	Killeen	Dunshaughlin
Glebe	40	Ratoath	Rathregan	Dunshaughlin
Glebe	32	Lower Kells	Kilbeg	Kells
Glebe	21	Lower Kells	Moynalty	Kells
Glebe	61	Lower Navan	Ardbraccan	Navan
Glebe	31	Morgallion	Clongill	Navan
Glebe	35	Fore	Kilbride	Oldcastle
Glebe	51	Fore	Killallon	Oldcastle
Glebe	33	Fore	Killeagh	Oldcastle
Glebe	71	Fore	Loughcrew	Oldcastle
Glebe	34	Lune	Killaconnigan	Trim
Glebe	151	Lower Moyfenrath	Rathmolyon	Trim
Glebe	20	Lower Moyfenrath	Trim	Trim
Glenaward	132	Fore	Moylagh	Oldcastle
Glenboy	273	Fore	Kilbride	Oldcastle
Glenrath	44	Lower Kells	Kilbeg	Kells
Golashane	287	Lower Kells	Moynalty	Kells
Gormanston	916	Upper Duleek	Stamullin	Drogheda
**Gormanstown**	Town	Upper Duleek	Stamullin	Drogheda
Gormanstown	208	Ratoath	Rathbeggan	Dunshaughlin
Gormanstown	158	Upper Navan	Trim	Trim
Gortloney	545	Fore	Moylagh	Oldcastle
Gortnahorna.	168	Upper Moyfenrath	Castlejordan	Edenderry
Graigs	446	Lower Navan	Donaghmore	Navan
Grange	182	Upper Duleek	Clonalvy	Drogheda
Grange	273	Dunboyne	Dunboyne	Dunshaughlin
Grange	100	Ratoath	Ratoath	Dunshaughlin
Grange	493	Lower Navan	Ardbraccan	Navan
Grange	829	Upper Navan	Bective	Navan
Grange	180	Morgallion	Kilshine	Navan
Grange	500	Lower Deece	Scurlockstown	Trim
Grange Glebe	422	Upper Kells	Kells	Kells
Grangegeeth	1,598	Upper Slane	Grangegeeth	Ardee
Grangegoddan Glebe	232	Upper Kells	Kells	Kells
Grangend	9	Ratoath	Dunshaughlin	Dunshaughlin
Grangend Common	64	Ratoath	Dunshaughlin	Dunshaughlin
Gravelstown	1,007	Lower Kells	Emlagh	Kells
Greatfurze	153	Upper Navan	Trim	Trim
Greenan	312	Lower Slane	Drumcondra	Ardee
Greenan	608	Fore	Moylagh	Oldcastle
Greenanstown	174	Upper Duleek	Stamullin	Drogheda
Greenhills	148	Lower Slane	Siddan	Ardee
Greenoge	687	Ratoath	Greenoge	Dunshaughlin
**Greenogue**	Town	Ratoath	Greenoge	Dunshaughlin
Greetiagh	226	Lower Navan	Martry	Kells
Grennanstown	704	Lune	Athboy	Trim
Grove Island	5	Lower Duleek	Donore	Drogheda
Growtown	222	Ratoath	Ballymaglassan	Dunshaughlin
Growtown	307	Ratoath	Rathbeggan	Dunshaughlin
Gunnocks	517	Dunboyne	Dunboyne	Dunshaughlin
Gunstown	43	Ratoath	Ratoath	Dunshaughlin
Halfcarton	298	Fore	Killeagh	Oldcastle
Hallstown	286	Ratoath	Trevet	Dunshaughlin
Halltown	339	Lower Navan	Churchtown	Navan
Hamlinstown	174	Fore	Diamor	Oldcastle
Hammondstown	82	Upper Duleek	Clonalvy	Drogheda
Hammondtown	99	Ratoath	Cookstown	Dunshaughlin
Hamwood	321	Dunboyne	Dunboyne	Dunshaughlin
Hanlonstown	324	Lower Navan	Ardbraccan	Navan
Hardwood	714	Upper Moyfenrath	Clonard	Edenderry
Harlinstown	4	Upper Slane	Gernonstown	Navan
Harlinstown	178	Upper Slane	Slane	Navan
Harlockstown	197	Ratoath	Ballymaglassan	Dunshaughlin
Harlockstown	375	Ratoath	Ratoath	Dunshaughlin
Harmanstown	243	Upper Slane	Stackallan	Navan
Harristown	216	Upper Deece	Moyglare	Celbridge
Harristown	835	Upper Moyfenrath	Ballyboggan	Edenderry
Harristown	859	Skreen	Ardmulchan	Navan
Hartstown	855	Fore	Killallon	Oldcastle
Hawkinstown	3	Upper Duleek	Ardcath	Dunshaughlin
Hawkinstown	259	Upper Duleek	Piercetown	Dunshaughlin
Hayestown	124	Upper Deece	Culmullin	Dunshaughlin
Haystown and Carnuff Little	1,005	Skreen	Ardmulchan	Navan
Headfort Demesne	946	Upper Kells	Kells	Kells
Headstown	307	Morgallion	Castletown	Navan
Heathtown	372	Upper Duleek	Clonalvy	Drogheda
Hennigan	152	Morgallion	Nobber	Kells
Herbertstown	595	Upper Duleek	Stamullin	Drogheda
Herbertstown	308	Dunboyne	Dunboyne	Dunshaughlin
Herbertstown	572	Lower Navan	Martry	Kells
Herbertstown	452	Fore	Killallon	Oldcastle
Hermitage (Or Aghnancane)	198	Lower Kells	Moynalty	Kells
Heronstown	599	Lower Slane	Killary	Ardee
Higginstown	197	Upper Slane	Slane	Navan
Higginstown	470	Lune	Athboy	Trim
Hilltown	196	Dunboyne	Dunboyne	Dunshaughlin
Hilltown	137	Upper Duleek	Piercetown	Dunshaughlin
Hilltown Great	441	Upper Duleek	Duleek	Drogheda
Hilltown Little	184	Upper Duleek	Duleek	Drogheda
Hoardstown	264	Lower Slane	Killary	Ardee
Hodgestown	112	Upper Duleek	Stamullin	Drogheda
Hollymount	123	Upper Duleek	Moorechurch	Drogheda
Hopkinstown	300	Lower Slane	Killary	Ardee
Horath	419	Lower Kells	Kilbeg	Kells
Horistown	560	Upper Slane	Rathkenny	Navan
Hospital Land	68	Lune	Athboy	Trim
Howthstown	299	Lower Slane	Siddan	Ardee
Hurcle	489	Upper Slane	Tullyallen	Drogheda
Hurdlestown	458	Upper Kells	Teltown	Kells
Iflernock	489	Lower Moyfenrath	Laracor	Trim
Inan	405	Upper Moyfenrath	Killyon	Trim
**Innfield**	Town	Lower Moyfenrath	Rathcore	Trim
Irishtown	96	Upper Duleek	Ardcath	Drogheda
Irishtown	586	Upper Duleek	Moorechurch	Drogheda
Irishtown	158	Dunboyne	Kilbride	Dunshaughlin
Irishtown	228	Skreen	Kilmoon	Dunshaughlin
Irishtown	252	Skreen	Timoole	Dunshaughlin
Irishtown	106	Upper Kells	Burry	Kells
Irishtown	162	Lower Navan	Ardbraccan	Navan
Isaacstown	820	Lower Moyfenrath	Rathmolyon	Trim
Iskaroon	274	Upper Navan	Moymet	Trim
Iskaroon Little	14	Upper Navan	Moymet	Trim
Jamestown	235	Ratoath	Ratoath	Dunshaughlin
Jamestown	535	Lune	Rathmore	Trim
Jarretstown	250	Dunboyne	Dunboyne	Dunshaughlin
Jealoustown	383	Ratoath	Trevet	Dunshaughlin
Jenkinstown	97	Upper Deece	Kilclone	Dunshaughlin
Jenkinstown	302	Upper Deece	Kilmore	Dunshaughlin
Johnsbrook	172	Upper Kells	Girley	Kells
Johnstown	128	Upper Duleek	Duleek	Drogheda
Johnstown	180	Ratoath	Donaghmore	Dunshaughlin
Johnstown	457	Ratoath	Dunshaughlin	Dunshaughlin
Johnstown	418	Upper Kells	Kilskeer	Kells
Johnstown	123	Skreen	Athlumney	Navan
Johnstown	79	Lower Duleek	Fennor	Navan
Johnstown	806	Lower Moyfenrath	Rathcore	Trim
Johnstown	265	Lower Moyfenrath	Rathmolyon	Trim
Jonesborough (or Killaconin)	252	Upper Kells	Loughan or Castlekeeran	Kells
Jordanstown	148	Lower Navan	Martry	Kells
Jordanstown	184	Skreen	Tara	Navan
Jordanstown	472	Lower Moyfenrath	Rathcore	Trim
**Julianstown**	Town	Lower Duleek	Julianstown	Drogheda
Julianstown	776	Morgallion	Nobber	Kells
Julianstown	177	Morgallion	Castletown	Navan
Julianstown East	204	Lower Duleek	Julianstown	Drogheda
Julianstown South	59	Lower Duleek	Julianstown	Drogheda
Julianstown West	266	Lower Duleek	Julianstown	Drogheda
Kearntown	324	Lower Slane	Drumcondra	Ardee
Keenaghan	296	Lower Kells	Enniskeen	Kells
Keenaghan	294	Fore	Killallon	Oldcastle
Keenoge	185	Upper Duleek	Duleek	Drogheda
Keenoge	134	Upper Duleek	Moorechurch	Drogheda
Keeran	106	Lower Slane	Siddan	Ardee
**Kells**	Town	Upper Kells	Kells	Kells
Kellystown	340	Lower Slane	Drumcondra	Ardee
Kellystown	119	Lower Duleek	Duleek	Drogheda
Kellystown	531	Upper Slane	Monknewtown	Drogheda
Kemmins Mill	81	Upper Deece	Kilclone	Dunshaughlin
Kennaghstown	79	Dunboyne	Dunboyne	Dunshaughlin
Kennastown	359	Lower Navan	Ardsallagh	Navan
Kennastown	360	Lower Moyfenrath	Trim	Trim
Kennetstown	257	Upper Duleek	Moorechurch	Drogheda
Kentstown	459	Lower Duleek	Kentstown	Navan
Kilballivor	225	Lune	Killaconnigan	Trim
Kilballyporter	434	Lower Moyfenrath	Rathmolyon	Trim
Kilbeg Lower	344	Lower Kells	Kilbeg	Kells
Kilbeg Upper	311	Lower Kells	Kilbeg	Kells
**Kilberry**	Town	Morgallion	Kilberry	Navan
Kilberry	566	Morgallion	Kilberry	Navan
Kilboyne	161	Lower Kells	Moybolgue	Kells
Kilbreckstown	147	Upper Duleek	Stamullin	Drogheda
Kilbrew	799	Ratoath	Kilbrew	Dunshaughlin
Kilbrew	160	Skreen	Kilmoon	Dunshaughlin
Kilbride	493	Morgallion	Nobber	Kells
Kilbride	1,102	Upper Navan	Moymet	Trim
Kilcarn	985	Skreen	Kilcarn	Navan
Kilcarty	710	Lower Deece	Kilmessan	Dunshaughlin
Kilclone	599	Upper Deece	Kilclone	Dunshaughlin
**Kilcock**	Town	Upper Deece	Rodanstown	Celbridge
Kilcooly	82	Lower Deece	Knockmark	Dunshaughlin
Kilcooly	419	Upper Navan	Kilcooly	Trim
Kilcorney	454	Lower Moyfenrath	Rathcore	Trim
**Kildalkey**	Town	Lune	Kildalkey	Trim
Kildalkey	1,314	Lune	Kildalkey	Trim
Kildangan	529	Upper Moyfenrath	Castlejordan	Edenderry
Kilfannan	184	Lower Kells	Moybolgue	Kells
Kilglin	336	Upper Deece	Balfeaghan	Celbridge
Kilgraigue	385	Upper Deece	Moyglare	Celbridge
Kilkeelan	681	Lune	Athboy	Trim
Kilkeeran	151	Upper Moyfenrath	Castlejordan	Edenderry
Kill Beg	85	Lower Moyfenrath	Rathmolyon	Trim
Kill More	114	Lower Moyfenrath	Rathmolyon	Trim
Killacomnor Jonesborough	252	Upper Kells	Loughan or Castlekeeran	Kells
Killaconnigan	649	Lune	Killaconnigan	Trim
Killacroy	209	Fore	Killallon	Oldcastle
Killadden	226	Lower Slane	Loughbrackan	Ardee
Killagriff (or Corgreagh)	412	Lower Kells	Moybolgue	Kells
Killary	918	Lower Slane	Killary	Ardee
Killaskillen	1,484	Upper Moyfenrath	Ballyboggan	Edenderry
Killeany	357	Upper Deece	Moyglare	Celbridge
Killeen	1,264	Skreen	Killeen	Dunshaughlin
Killegland	716	Ratoath	Killegland	Dunshaughlin
Killester	147	Ratoath	Rathbeggan	Dunshaughlin
Killyon	444	Upper Moyfenrath	Killyon	Trim
**Kilmainham**	Town	Lower Kells	Kilmainham	Kells
Kilmainham	37	Upper Kells	Kells	Kells
Kilmainham	1,294	Upper Kells	Teltown	Kells
Kilmainham (Headfort)	200	Upper Kells	Kells	Kells
Kilmainham (Headfort)	51	Upper Kells	Teltown	Kells
Kilmainhamwood	280	Lower Kells	Kilmainham	Kells
**Kilmessan**	Town	Lower Deece	Kilmessan	Dunshaughlin
Kilmessan	754	Lower Deece	Kilmessan	Dunshaughlin
Kilmoon	241	Skreen	Kilmoon	Dunshaughlin
Kilmore	760	Upper Deece	Kilmore	Dunshaughlin
Kilmur	317	Lune	Killaconnigan	Trim
Kilmurry	380	Lower Moyfenrath	Rathcore	Trim
Kilmurry	727	Lower Moyfenrath	Trim	Trim
Kilnagallagh	270	Upper Moyfenrath	Clonard	Edenderry
Kilnagross	118	Upper Navan	Trim	Trim
Kilnalun	176	Morgallion	Enniskeen	Kells
Kilnew	199	Upper Duleek	Duleek Abbey	Drogheda
Kilrue	612	Ratoath	Ratoath	Dunshaughlin
Kilruffin	173	Lower Slane	Drumcondra	Ardee
Kilsharvan	199	Lower Duleek	Kilsharvan	Drogheda
Kilskeer	1,590	Upper Kells	Kilskeer	Kells
Kiltale	857	Lower Deece	Kiltale	Dunshaughlin
Kiltoome	179	Upper Navan	Kilcooly	Trim
Kiltrough	135	Lower Duleek	Colp	Drogheda
Kilwarden	900	Upper Moyfenrath	Clonard	Edenderry
Kimmins	217	Upper Deece	Moyglare	Celbridge
Kingsmountain	122	Upper Kells	Kilskeer	Kells
Kingsmountain	170	Fore	Killallon	Oldcastle
Kingstown and Carnuff Great	561	Skreen	Ardmulchan	Navan
Kinoristown	63	Dunboyne	Dunboyne	Dunshaughlin
Knavinstown	228	Ratoath	Crickstown	Dunshaughlin
Knightsbrook	473	Lower Moyfenrath	Laracor	Trim
Knightstown	615	Morgallion	Kilshine	Navan
Knock	975	Morgallion	Knock	Navan
Knockaranny	40	Upper Kells	Dulane	Kells
Knockbrack	223	Fore	Loughcrew	Oldcastle
Knockcommon	326	Lower Duleek	Knockcommon	Navan
Knockerk	465	Upper Slane	Slane	Navan
Knockersally (or Colehill)	1,761	Upper Moyfenrath	Ballyboggan	Edenderry
Knockglass	293	Upper Kells	Dulane	Kells
Knockharley	291	Lower Duleek	Kentstown	Navan
Knockisland	183	Lower Duleek	Duleek	Drogheda
Knockisland	5	Upper Duleek	Duleek	Drogheda
Knocklough	919	Fore	Loughcrew	Oldcastle
Knockmacoony	198	Fore	Oldcastle	Oldcastle
Knockmark	670	Lower Deece	Knockmark	Dunshaughlin
Knockmooney	147	Upper Slane	Slane	Navan
Knocknahattin	36	Lune	Athboy	Trim
Knocks	82	Ratoath	Dunshaughlin	Dunshaughlin
Knockshangan	122	Lune	Athboy	Trim
Knockstown	68	Lower Deece	Kilmessan	Dunshaughlin
Knockstown	322	Upper Deece	Kilmore	Dunshaughlin
Knockstown	299	Lower Deece	Trubley	Trim
Knockudder	76	Dunboyne	Dunboyne	Dunshaughlin
Knockumber	70	Lower Navan	Liscartan	Navan
Knockumber	529	Lower Navan	Navan	Navan
Knowth	313	Upper Slane	Monknewtown	Drogheda
Laacor	392	Lower Moyfenrath	Laracor	Trim
Lackanash	26	Upper Navan	Trim	Trim
Lackmelch	60	Upper Kells	Kells	Kells
Lacystown	140	Upper Duleek	Stamullin	Drogheda
Lady Island	2	Lune	Kildalkey	Trim
Ladyrath	994	Upper Slane	Rathkenny	Navan
Lagavooren	648	Drogheda and Muni. Borough	St. Mary's	Drogheda
Lagore Big	409	Ratoath	Ratoath	Dunshaughlin
Lagore Little	514	Ratoath	Ratoath	Dunshaughlin
Lakefield	220	Fore	Killallon	Oldcastle
Lambertstown	84	Lower Deece	Kilmessan	Dunshaughlin
Largy	184	Lower Slane	Drumcondra	Ardee
Lawrencetown (or Oakleypark)	741	Upper Kells	Dulane	Kells
Leafin	93	Morgallion	Nobber	Kells
Legagunnia	127	Ratoath	Ratoath	Dunshaughlin
Leggagh	1,046	Morgallion	Drakestown	Navan
Legganhall	228	Upper Duleek	Moorechurch	Drogheda
Leitrim Lower	268	Lower Kells	Moynalty	Kells
Leitrim Upper	199	Lower Kells	Moynalty	Kells
Leonardstown	184	Upper Deece	Kilmore	Dunshaughlin
Leshemstown	482	Ratoath	Dunshaughlin	Dunshaughlin
Letachmentgallon	84	Lower Kells	Moybolgue	Kells
Lewellensland	158	Upper Moyfenrath	Castlejordan	Edenderry
Limekilnhill	154	Lower Navan	Navan	Navan
Lionsden	345	Upper Moyfenrath	Castlerickard	Trim
Lisboy	83	Lower Slane	Siddan	Ardee
Liscartan	771	Lower Navan	Liscartan	Navan
Lisdornan	835	Upper Duleek	Moorechurch	Drogheda
Lislea	102	Lower Kells	Enniskeen	Kells
Lismahon	229	Ratoath	Rathregan	Dunshaughlin
Lismullin	938	Skreen	Lismullin	Navan
Lisnabo	184	Lower Kells	Enniskeen	Kells
Lisnaboy	50	Lower Kells	Moybolgue	Kells
Lisnagon	278	Upper Kells	Kilskeer	Kells
Lisnagrow	144	Lower Kells	Enniskeen	Kells
Littlerath	266	Upper Navan	Kilcooly	Trim
Lloyd Commons of	509	Upper Kells	Kells	Kells
Lobinstown	466	Lower Slane	Killary	Ardee
Loganstown	283	Upper Navan	Kilcooly	Trim
Longford	69	Lower Duleek	Duleek	Drogheda
Longtown	125	Upper Deece	Kilclone	Dunshaughlin
**Longwood**	Town	Upper Moyfenrath	Castlerickard	Trim
**Longwood**	Town	Upper Moyfenrath	Clonard	Trim
Longwood	296	Upper Moyfenrath	Castlerickard	Trim
Longwood	540	Upper Moyfenrath	Clonard	Trim
Lordstown	167	Fore	Diamor	Oldcastle
Losset	253	Lower Kells	Moybolgue	Kells
Loughan	587	Upper Kells	Loughan or Castlekeeran	Kells
Loughanbrean	223	Fore	Killallon	Oldcastle
Loughanderg	282	Fore	Killallon	Oldcastle
Loughanstown	397	Skreen	Rathfeigh	Dunshaughlin
Loughbrackan	530	Lower Slane	Loughbrackan	Ardee
Loughcrew	1,013	Fore	Loughcrew	Oldcastle
Lougher	639	Lower Duleek	Duleek	Drogheda
Loughlinstown	267	Ratoath	Kilbrew	Dunshaughlin
Loughlinstown	301	Ratoath	Ratoath	Dunshaughlin
Loughsallagh	165	Dunboyne	Dunboyne	Dunshaughlin
Lunderstown	287	Upper Duleek	Duleek	Drogheda
Lurganboy	127	Fore	Moylagh	Oldcastle
Lustown	109	Dunboyne	Dunboyne	Dunshaughlin
Lynaghstown	160	Ratoath	Ballymaglassan	Dunshaughlin
Mabestown	207	Dunboyne	Kilbride	Dunshaughlin
Macetown	1,248	Skreen	Macetown	Dunshaughlin
Macetown	316	Lower Navan	Ardsallagh	Navan
Mackanhill	30	Lower Slane	Inishmot	Ardee
Mahonstown	254	Upper Kells	Dulane	Kells
Mandistown	831	Lower Slane	Inishmot	Ardee
Mannastown	217	Upper Duleek	Ardcath	Drogheda
Manorland 1st Division	87	Lower Moyfenrath	Trim	Trim
Manorland 2nd Division	216	Lower Moyfenrath	Trim	Trim
Maperath	173	Upper Kells	Dulane	Kells
Maperath	511	Upper Kells	Loughan or Castlekeeran	Kells
Marshallstown (or Crumpstown)	354	Lower Deece	Scurlockstown	Trim
Martinstown	18	Upper Deece	Kilmore	Dunshaughlin
Martinstown	262	Fore	Diamor	Oldcastle
Martinstown	789	Lune	Athboy	Trim
Martinstown	237	Lower Deece	Galtrim	Trim
Martry	754	Lower Navan	Martry	Kells
Marvelstown	267	Lower Kells	Kilbeg	Kells
Maryland	49	Upper Duleek	Ardcath	Drogheda
Masspool	141	Ratoath	Greenoge	Dunshaughlin
Maudlin	59	Upper Kells	Kells	Kells
Maudlin	105	Lower Moyfenrath	Trim	Trim
Mayne	419	Dunboyne	Dunboyne	Dunshaughlin
Meadstown	1,254	Upper Navan	Clonmacduff	Trim
Meath Hill	958	Lower Slane	Ardagh	Kells
Meath Moor of	90	Dunboyne	Dunboyne	Dunshaughlin
Meenlagh	285	Upper Kells	Loughan or Castlekeeran	Kells
Mellifont	264	Upper Slane	Monknewtown	Drogheda
Mellifont	460	Upper Slane	Tullyallen	Drogheda
Mentrim	280	Lower Slane	Inishmot	Ardee
Merrywell	122	Ratoath	Dunshaughlin	Dunshaughlin
Merrywell	16	Lower Deece	Knockmark	Dunshaughlin
Micknanstown	164	Upper Duleek	Ardcath	Drogheda
Micknanstown	362	Upper Duleek	Clonalvy	Drogheda
Middleborough	133	Upper Moyfenrath	Clonard	Trim
Milestown	277	Dunboyne	Dunboyne	Dunshaughlin
Milestown	170	Upper Kells	Donaghpatrick	Navan
Mill Land	116	Ratoath	Rathbeggan	Dunshaughlin
Mill Land and Curleyland	173	Lune	Athboy	Trim
Milltown	189	Upper Duleek	Duleek Abbey	Drogheda
Milltown	530	Ratoath	Donaghmore	Dunshaughlin
Milltown	180	Upper Deece	Kilclone	Dunshaughlin
Milltown	208	Upper Kells	Balrathboyne	Kells
Milltown	630	Fore	Moylagh	Oldcastle
Milltown	126	Lower Deece	Galtrim	Trim
Milltown	424	Lune	Rathmore	Trim
Ministown	280	Lower Duleek	Julianstown	Drogheda
Mitchelstown	355	Lower Slane	Mitchelstown	Ardee
Mitchelstown	776	Lune	Athboy	Trim
Mitchelstown	158	Lower Deece	Galtrim	Trim
Moat	302	Upper Kells	Dulane	Kells
Moat	340	Lower Kells	Kilbeg	Kells
Moat	792	Fore	Killeagh	Oldcastle
Moat	275	Lower Moyfenrath	Rathmolyon	Trim
Moat Town	512	Lune	Kildalkey	Trim
Moathill	41	Lower Navan	Navan	Navan
Molerick	626	Upper Moyfenrath	Clonard	Edenderry
Monagalliagh	20	Upper Moyfenrath	Clonard	Edenderry
Monennican	116	Fore	Killallon	Oldcastle
Monenstown	179	Lower Deece	Galtrim	Trim
Moneymore	227	Upper Moyfenrath	Clonard	Trim
Moneymore	200	Lower Moyfenrath	Rathmolyon	Trim
Monknewtown	1,086	Upper Slane	Monknewtown	Drogheda
Monktown	1,036	Skreen	Monktown	Navan
Monktown	244	Lower Moyfenrath	Trim	Trim
Monneystown	465	Lower Slane	Drumcondra	Ardee
Mooneystown	369	Lune	Rathmore	Trim
Moor of Meath	90	Dunboyne	Dunboyne	Dunshaughlin
Moorechurch	203	Upper Duleek	Moorechurch	Drogheda
Moorepark	763	Upper Duleek	Piercetown	Dunshaughlin
Mooresides	265	Upper Duleek	Clonalvy	Drogheda
Mooretown	306	Lower Slane	Siddan	Ardee
Mooretown	194	Upper Duleek	Ardcath	Drogheda
Mooretown	260	Lower Deece	Knockmark	Dunshaughlin
Mooretown	303	Ratoath	Ratoath	Dunshaughlin
Mooretown	279	Skreen	Athlumney	Navan
Mooretown	204	Upper Slane	Slane	Navan
Moorlagh	75	Lower Kells	Kilmainham	Kells
Moortown	193	Morgallion	Kilberry	Navan
Morington	1,155	Lower Duleek	Colp	Drogheda
**Mornington**	Town	Lower Duleek	Colp	Drogheda
Morrell	204	Skreen	Kilcarn	Navan
Mosney	200	Upper Duleek	Moorechurch	Drogheda
Mountainpole	340	Upper Kells	Dulane	Kells
Mountainpole (or Rochfortsland)	84	Upper Kells	Kells	Kells
Mountainstown	495	Morgallion	Kilshine	Navan
Mountfortescue	245	Upper Slane	Grangegeeth	Ardee
Mountland (or Butterhouse)	107	Lower Deece	Scurlockstown	Trim
Moy	159	Lower Moyfenrath	Laracor	Trim
Moyagher	385	Lune	Rathmore	Trim
Moyagher Lower	386	Lune	Rathmore	Trim
Moydorragh	184	Lower Kells	Cruicetown	Kells
Moydrum (or Bogstown)	369	Upper Moyfenrath	Clonard	Edenderry
Moyfeagher	371	Lune	Killaconnigan	Trim
Moyfin	389	Upper Moyfenrath	Clonard	Trim
Moygaddy	581	Upper Deece	Moyglare	Celbridge
Moyglare	914	Upper Deece	Moyglare	Celbridge
Moyhill	202	Lower Kells	Moybolgue	Kells
Moylagh	384	Fore	Moylagh	Oldcastle
Moyleggan	154	Ratoath	Rathregan	Dunshaughlin
Moymet	906	Upper Navan	Moymet	Trim
Moynagh	135	Morgallion	Castletown	Kells
**Moynalty**	Town	Lower Kells	Moynalty	Kells
Moynalty	483	Lower Kells	Moynalty	Kells
Moynalvy	740	Upper Deece	Kilmore	Dunshaughlin
Moynasboy	149	Lower Moyfenrath	Trim	Trim
Moyrath	966	Lune	Kildalkey	Trim
Muchwood	433	Lune	Killaconnigan	Trim
Muckerstown	359	Ratoath	Donaghmore	Dunshaughlin
Muff	604	Morgallion	Nobber	Kells
Mulhussey	881	Upper Deece	Kilclone	Dunshaughlin
Mullagh	496	Upper Deece	Kilmore	Dunshaughlin
Mullagh	87	Fore	Loughcrew	Oldcastle
Mullagha	586	Upper Slane	Rathkenny	Navan
Mullaghard	67	Upper Kells	Donaghpatrick	Navan
Mullagharoy	283	Upper Slane	Grangegeeth	Ardee
Mullaghavally	267	Lower Kells	Moybolgue	Kells
Mullaghboy	104	Morgallion	Enniskeen	Kells
Mullaghboy	74	Lower Navan	Navan	Navan
Mullaghdillon	264	Upper Slane	Slane	Navan
Mullaghey	115	Upper Kells	Kells	Kells
Mullaghfin	252	Lower Duleek	Duleek	Drogheda
Mullaghmore	269	Lower Slane	Drumcondra	Ardee
Mullaghmore (or Allerstown)	189	Lower Navan	Ardbraccan	Navan
Mullaghreagh	94	Lower Kells	Kilbeg	Kells
Mullaghroe	117	Upper Slane	Gernonstown	Navan
Mullaghstones	195	Lune	Athboy	Trim
Mullaghteelin	536	Upper Duleek	Moorechurch	Drogheda
Mullaghwillin	105	Lower Slane	Siddan	Ardee
Mullinam	392	Ratoath	Ratoath	Dunshaughlin
Mullyandrew	100	Lower Slane	Drumcondra	Ardee
Mullystaghan	150	Lower Kells	Moybolgue	Kells
Mulphedder	704	Upper Moyfenrath	Clonard	Edenderry
Murrens	206	Fore	Moylough	Oldcastle
Naul	707	Upper Duleek	Clonalvy	Drogheda
Naulswood	63	Dunboyne	Dunboyne	Dunshaughlin
**Navan**	Town	Skreen	Athlumney	Navan
**Navan**	Town	Lower Navan	Donaghmore	Navan
**Navan**	Town	Lower Navan	Navan	Navan
Neillstown	484	Lower Navan	Ardbraccan	Navan
Neillstown	186	Lune	Kildalkey	Trim
Neillstown Park	20	Lower Navan	Ardbraccan	Navan
Nevinstown	239	Lower Navan	Donaghmore	Navan
Newcastle	176	Morgallion	Enniskeen	Kells
Newcastle	474	Lower Kells	Moynalty	Kells
Newcastle	808	Fore	Oldcastle	Oldcastle
Newcastle	1,359	Lower Moyfenrath	Rathcore	Trim
Newgrange	782	Upper Slane	Monknewtown	Drogheda
Newhaggard	188	Upper Duleek	Kilsharvan	Drogheda
Newhaggard	622	Lower Moyfenrath	Trim	Trim
Newrath	267	Lower Kells	Kilbeg	Kells
Newrath	195	Upper Slane	Slane	Navan
Newrath Big	103	Lower Slane	Siddan	Ardee
Newrath Big	153	Upper Kells	Kells	Kells
Newrath Little	117	Upper Kells	Kells	Kells
Newstone	721	Lower Slane	Drumcondra	Ardee
Newtown	214	Upper Duleek	Ardcath	Drogheda
Newtown	129	Lower Duleek	Colp	Drogheda
Newtown	344	Lower Duleek	Duleek	Drogheda
Newtown	71	Ratoath	Ratoath	Dunshaughlin
Newtown	234	Lower Kells	Cruicetown	Kells
Newtown	335	Lower Kells	Kilmainham	Kells
Newtown	566	Lower Kells	Newtown	Kells
Newtown	709	Lower Duleek	Knockcommon	Navan
Newtown	279	Fore	Killallon	Oldcastle
Newtown	261	Fore	Loughcrew	Oldcastle
Newtown	119	Upper Navan	Newtownclonbun	Trim
Newtown (or Ballyfallon)	650	Lune	Athboy	Trim
Newtown (or Cloneen)	351	Upper Moyfenrath	Killyon	Trim
Newtown Commons	300	Ratoath	Greenoge	Dunshaughlin
Newtown Girley	675	Upper Kells	Girley	Kells
Newtownclonbun	267	Upper Navan	Newtownclonbun	Trim
Newtownmoyaghy	312	Upper Deece	Moyglare	Celbridge
Newtownmoyaghy	293	Upper Deece	Rodanstown	Celbridge
Newtownmoynagh	533	Lower Moyfenrath	Trim	Trim
Newtownrathganley	491	Upper Deece	Kilmore	Dunshaughlin
Ninch	686	Lower Duleek	Julianstown	Drogheda
**Nobber**	Town	Morgallion	Nobber	Kells
Nobber	501	Morgallion	Nobber	Kells
Norbrinstown (or Normanstown)	287	Upper Kells	Kells	Kells
Normansgrove	74	Dunboyne	Dunboyne	Dunshaughlin
Normanstown (or Norbrinstown)	287	Upper Kells	Kells	Kells
Nugentstown	236	Upper Kells	Balrathboyne	Kells
Nuttstown	301	Dunboyne	Kilbride	Dunshaughlin
Oakleypark (or Lawrencetown)	741	Upper Kells	Dulane	Kells
Oakstown	183	Upper Navan	Trim	Trim
Oberstown	538	Skreen	Skreen	Dunshaughlin
Odder	595	Skreen	Tara	Navan
Oldbridge	732	Lower Duleek	Donore	Drogheda
**Oldcastle**	Town	Fore	Oldcastle	Oldcastle
Oldcastle	1,257	Fore	Oldcastle	Oldcastle
Oldgraigue	158	Upper Deece	Moyglare	Celbridge
Oldtown	170	Lower Navan	Martry	Kells
Oldtown	509	Skreen	Kilcarn	Navan
Oldtown	55	Upper Deece	Gallow	Trim
Oldtown	267	Upper Deece	Rathcore	Trim
Oldtully	216	Fore	Oldcastle	Oldcastle
Ongenstown	203	Upper Duleek	Duleek	Drogheda
Ongenstown	1,267	Lower Navan	Ardbraccan	Navan
Oranstown	156	Dunboyne	Dunboyne	Dunshaughlin
**Oristown**	Town	Upper Kells	Teltown	Kells
Oristown	1,835	Upper Kells	Teltown	Kells
Oristown	133	Morgallion	Clongill	Navan
Otterstown	183	Lune	Athboy	Trim
Owenstown	108	Upper Deece	Moyglare	Celbridge
Pace	225	Dunboyne	Dunboyne	Dunshaughlin
Paddingstown	33	Dunboyne	Dunboyne	Dunshaughlin
Paddock	160	Ratoath	Ratoath	Dunshaughlin
Padinstown	291	Upper Deece	Balfeaghan	Celbridge
Pagestown	439	Upper Deece	Kilclone	Dunshaughlin
Painestown	160	Lower Duleek	Colp	Drogheda
Painestown	616	Skreen	Macetown	Dunshaughlin
Painestown	550	Morgallion	Castletown	Navan
Painestown	1,487	Lower Duleek	Painestown	Navan
Park	718	Upper Moyfenrath	Ballyboggan	Edenderry
Park	71	Upper Moyfenrath	Clonard	Edenderry
Parkboy	15	Lower Navan	Navan	Navan
Parkstown	346	Lune	Killaconnigan	Trim
Parsonstown	438	Ratoath	Rathregan	Dunshaughlin
Parsonstown Demesne	643	Lower Slane	Killary	Ardee
Patrickstown	1,055	Fore	Diamor	Oldcastle
Peacockstown	247	Ratoath	Ratoath	Dunshaughlin
Pelletstown	455	Ratoath	Dunshaughlin	Dunshaughlin
Pepperstown	104	Upper Kells	Burry	Kells
Peru	93	Lower Kells	Newtown	Kells
Peterstown	178	Upper Navan	Newtownclonbun	Trim
Peterstown	28	Upper Navan	Trim	Trim
Phepotstown	702	Upper Deece	Kilmore	Dunshaughlin
Philipstown	292	Fore	Diamor	Oldcastle
Phillinstown	256	Upper Navan	Trim	Trim
Phillistown	92	Upper Navan	Trim	Trim
Philpotstown	115	Lower Navan	Ardsallagh	Navan
Philpotstown	323	Skreen	Dowdstown	Navan
Philpotstown	224	Lower Navan	Rataine	Navan
Phoenixtown	440	Lower Navan	Martry	Kells
Piercetown	294	Lower Slane	Inishmot	Ardee
Piercetown	323	Upper Deece	Balfeaghan	Celbridge
Piercetown	668	Dunboyne	Dunboyne	Dunshaughlin
Piercetown	159	Upper Duleek	Piercetown	Dunshaughlin
Piercetown	548	Upper Kells	Balrathboyne	Kells
Pighill	125	Upper Slane	Stackallan	Navan
Pigotstown	236	Fore	Killallon	Oldcastle
Pilltown	288	Lower Duleek	Colp	Drogheda
Platin	1,405	Lower Duleek	Duleek	Drogheda
Pluckhimin (or Ballymuck)	156	Upper Duleek	Piercetown	Dunshaughlin
Pluckstown	380	Lune	Athboy	Trim
Polecastle	173	Lower Slane	Siddan	Ardee
Polleban	187	Ratoath	Ballymaglassan	Dunshaughlin
Portan	102	Dunboyne	Dunboyne	Dunshaughlin
Portan	345	Ratoath	Rathregan	Dunshaughlin
Portan	391	Lune	Killaconnigan	Trim
Portanab	345	Lune	Kildalkey	Trim
Portanclough	85	Lower Navan	Navan	Navan
Porterstown	49	Upper Deece	Moyglare	Celbridge
Porterstown	88	Upper Duleek	Ardcath	Drogheda
Porterstown	202	Ratoath	Rathbeggan	Dunshaughlin
Portlester	609	Lune	Killaconnigan	Trim
Portmanna	119	Dunboyne	Dunboyne	Dunshaughlin
Posseckstown	1,261	Morgallion	Nobber	Kells
Posseckstown	1,046	Lower Moyfenrath	Rathcore	Trim
Pottlebane	511	Upper Kells	Kilskeer	Kells
Pottlereagh	311	Upper Kells	Kilskeer	Kells
Powderlough	400	Ratoath	Rathbeggan	Dunshaughlin
Priest Town	456	Dunboyne	Kilbride	Dunshaughlin
Primatestown	646	Skreen	Kilmoon	Dunshaughlin
Princetown	224	Upper Duleek	Ardcath	Drogheda
Prioryland	428	Lower Duleek	Duleek	Drogheda
Proudfootstown	208	Upper Slane	Dowth	Drogheda
Proudstown	670	Skreen	Skreen	Dunshaughlin
Proudstown	710	Lower Navan	Donaghmore	Navan
Pubblestown	220	Lune	Kildalkey	Trim
Quarryland	402	Dunboyne	Dunboyne	Dunshaughlin
Quigelagh	324	Lower Kells	Moynalty	Kells
Rackenstown	229	Ratoath	Ratoath	Dunshaughlin
Rafeehan	53	Upper Kells	Burry	Kells
Raffin	272	Morgallion	Drakestown	Navan
Rahaghy	102	Fore	Loughcrew	Oldcastle
Rahard	560	Fore	Oldcastle	Oldcastle
Raheenacrehy	234	Upper Navan	Trim	Trim
Rahendrick	499	Upper Kells	Loughan or Castlekeeran	Kells
Rahill	74	Lower Duleek	Duleek	Drogheda
Rahinstown	569	Lower Moyfenrath	Rathcore	Trim
Raholland	215	Upper Duleek	Moorechurch	Drogheda
Rahood	599	Morgallion	Castletown	Kells
Raloaghan	632	Morgallion	Enniskeen	Kells
Randalstown	939	Upper Kells	Donaghpatrick	Navan
Raneevoge	217	Upper Kells	Kilskeer	Oldcastle
Rasillagh	240	Fore	Killeagh	Oldcastle
Rataine	718	Lower Navan	Rataine	Navan
Rath	213	Upper Duleek	Ardcath	Drogheda
Rath	174	Ratoath	Cookstown	Dunshaughlin
Rath	246	Ratoath	Greenoge	Dunshaughlin
Rath Hill	258	Ratoath	Dunshaughlin	Dunshaughlin
Rathaldron	243	Lower Navan	Donaghmore	Navan
Rathbane	360	Lower Kells	Moynalty	Kells
Rathbeggan	683	Ratoath	Rathbeggan	Dunshaughlin
Rathbrack	187	Upper Kells	Dulane	Kells
Rathbrack	419	Fore	Killallon	Oldcastle
Rathbrack	103	Fore	Moylagh	Oldcastle
Rathbran Beg	608	Lower Slane	Killary	Ardee
Rathbran More	694	Lower Slane	Killary	Ardee
Rathbranchurch	831	Lower Slane	Killary	Ardee
Rathcarran	778	Lune	Athboy	Trim
Rathcarstown	121	Upper Duleek	Clonalvy	Drogheda
Rathconny	335	Lune	Rathmore	Trim
Rathcool	129	Ratoath	Ratoath	Dunshaughlin
Rathcoon	613	Morgallion	Kilberry	Navan
Rathcore	828	Lower Moyfenrath	Rathcore	Trim
Rathcormick	622	Lune	Kildalkey	Trim
Rathdrinagh	757	Lower Duleek	Knockcommon	Navan
Rathe	401	Morgallion	Nobber	Kells
Rathfeigh	1,330	Skreen	Rathfeigh	Dunshaughlin
Rathflesk	300	Lower Moyfenrath	Rathmolyon	Trim
Rathgillon	578	Morgallion	Nobber	Kells
Rathinree Lower	332	Lower Kells	Moynalty	Kells
Rathinree Upper	363	Lower Kells	Moynalty	Kells
Rathkenna	344	Lune	Kildalkey	Trim
Rathkenny	1,598	Upper Slane	Rathkenny	Navan
Rathkilmore	277	Upper Deece	Kilmore	Dunshaughlin
Rathlagan	101	Lower Slane	Ardagh	Kells
Rathlagan	57	Lower Slane	Drumcondra	Kells
Rathleek	279	Dunboyne	Dunboyne	Dunshaughlin
Rathmaiden	257	Upper Slane	Slane	Navan
Rathmanoo	388	Lower Kells	Moynalty	Kells
Rathmea	246	Fore	Killeagh	Oldcastle
**Rathmolyon**	Town	Lower Moyfenrath	Rathmolyon	Trim
Rathmolyon	198	Lower Moyfenrath	Rathmolyon	Trim
Rathmore	915	Lune	Rathmore	Trim
Rathmullan	776	Lower Duleek	Donore	Drogheda
Rathnally	394	Upper Navan	Kilcooly	Trim
Rathoath Manor	16	Ratoath	Ratoath	Dunshaughlin
Rathregan	655	Ratoath	Rathregan	Dunshaughlin
Rathreynolds	107	Lower Slane	Siddan	Ardee
Rathstephen	234	Lower Kells	Moynalty	Kells
Rathtrasna	243	Lower Slane	Drumcondra	Ardee
Rathtroane	709	Lower Moyfenrath	Rathcore	Trim
**Ratoath**	Town	Ratoath	Ratoath	Dunshaughlin
Ratoath	978	Ratoath	Ratoath	Dunshaughlin
Raynestown	362	Ratoath	Rathbeggan	Dunshaughlin
Raystown	301	Ratoath	Ratoath	Dunshaughlin
Readsland	123	Ratoath	Dunshaughlin	Dunshaughlin
Readstown	433	Lower Moyfenrath	Laracor	Trim
Realtoge	249	Skreen	Brownstown	Navan
Reask	191	Lower Duleek	Duleek	Drogheda
Reask	805	Ratoath	Kilbrew	Dunshaughlin
Reask	91	Lower Kells	Emlagh	Kells
Redbog	209	Ratoath	Dunshaughlin	Dunshaughlin
Redmountain	100	Lower Duleek	Duleek	Drogheda
Ribstown	201	Ratoath	Rathregan	Dunshaughlin
Ricetown	69	Lower Slane	Killary	Ardee
Ricetown	283	Lower Slane	Mitchelstown	Ardee
Richardstown	101	Upper Duleek	Moorechurch	Drogheda
Riggins	121	Ratoath	Kilbrew	Dunshaughlin
Riggins	126	Skreen	Macetown	Dunshaughlin
Ringlestown	812	Lower Deece	Kilmessan	Dunshaughlin
Riverstown	412	Upper Duleek	Duleek	Drogheda
Riverstown	79	Upper Duleek	Piercetown	Dunshaughlin
Riverstown	907	Skreen	Tara	Navan
Roadmain	222	Skreen	Cushinstown	Dunshaughlin
Roanstown	276	Ratoath	Ballymaglassan	Dunshaughlin
Robertstown	293	Ratoath	Donaghmore	Dunshaughlin
Robertstown	1,678	Lower Kells	Kilbeg	Kells
Robinrath	120	Lower Navan	Navan	Navan
Robinstown	759	Upper Kells	Kilskeer	Kells
Robinstown	515	Lune	Killaconnigan	Trim
Rochestown	405	Upper Slane	Gernonstown	Navan
Rochfortsland (or Mountainpole)	84	Upper Kells	Kells	Kells
Rockfield	180	Upper Kells	Kells	Kells
Rodanstown	214	Upper Deece	Rodanstown	Celbridge
Rodstown	76	Upper Kells	Burry	Kells
Rodstown	263	Lower Navan	Martry	Kells
Roestown	398	Ratoath	Dunshaughlin	Dunshaughlin
Roestown	166	Upper Slane	Gernonstown	Navan
Rogerstown	518	Lower Duleek	Julianstown	Drogheda
Rolagh	174	Morgallion	Enniskeen	Kells
Roosky	252	Lower Slane	Drumcondra	Ardee
Roristown	259	Lower Moyfenrath	Trim	Trim
Ross	472	Skreen	Skreen	Dunshaughlin
Ross	119	Skreen	Tara	Navan
Ross	958	Fore	Killeagh	Oldcastle
Rossan	638	Upper Moyfenrath	Clonard	Edenderry
Rossmeen	887	Upper Kells	Kells	Kells
Rossnaree	694	Lower Duleek	Knockcommon	Navan
Roughgrange	763	Lower Duleek	Duleek	Drogheda
Rowan	180	Dunboyne	Dunboyne	Dunshaughlin
Rowlestown	98	Upper Duleek	Ardcath	Drogheda
Rudder	294	Upper Duleek	Duleek Abbey	Drogheda
Rushwee	105	Upper Slane	Slane	Navan
Rushwee	212	Upper Slane	Stackallan	Navan
Rusk	194	Dunboyne	Dunboyne	Dunshaughlin
Saddlestown	163	Upper Duleek	Stamullin	Drogheda
Saintjohns	58	Lower Moyfenrath	Laracor	Trim
Saintjohnsfort	180	Lower Slane	Siddan	Ardee
Salestown	302	Dunboyne	Dunboyne	Dunshaughlin
Sallybrook	133	Lower Slane	Drumcondra	Ardee
Sarney	247	Dunboyne	Dunboyne	Dunshaughlin
Sarsfieldstown	425	Upper Duleek	Moorechurch	Drogheda
Scalestown	186	Skreen	Trevet	Dunshaughlin
Scallanstown	389	Lower Navan	Liscartan	Navan
Scatternagh	253	Upper Duleek	Duleek	Drogheda
Scottstown	380	Upper Slane	Rathkenny	Navan
Screeboge	245	Lower Kells	Moynalty	Kells
Screeboge (or Ashfield)	270	Upper Moyfenrath	Clonard	Edenderry
Scurlockstown	425	Upper Kells	Burry	Kells
Scurlockstown	667	Lower Deece	Scurlockstown	Trim
Sedenrath	214	Upper Kells	Kells	Kells
Seller	287	Morgallion	Nobber	Kells
Seneschalstown	425	Lower Duleek	Painestown	Navan
Seraghstown	363	Fore	Killallon	Oldcastle
Sevitsland	74	Lower Duleek	Julianstown	Drogheda
Seymourstown Black	458	Upper Kells	Kilskeer	Kells
Shallon	434	Lower Duleek	Kilsharvan	Drogheda
Shalvanstown	252	Upper Slane	Gernonstown	Navan
Shanbo	290	Lower Navan	Rataine	Navan
Shancarnan	749	Lower Kells	Moynalty	Kells
Shanco	324	Fore	Killallon	Oldcastle
Shanco	333	Lune	Kildalkey	Trim
Shancor	248	Lower Kells	Kilmainham	Kells
Shanlothe	72	Lower Moyfenrath	Trim	Trim
Sheeny	154	Upper Kells	Kells	Kells
Sheephouse	373	Lower Duleek	Donore	Drogheda
Sicily	445	Lower Duleek	Danestown	Navan
**Siddan**	Town	Lower Slane	Siddan	Ardee
Siddan	242	Lower Slane	Siddan	Ardee
Silloge	624	Morgallion	Kilberry	Navan
Simonstown	516	Lower Navan	Donaghmore	Navan
Skearke	312	Lower Kells	Moynalty	Kells
**Skreen**	Town	Skreen	Skreen	Dunshaughlin
Skreen	1,266	Skreen	Skreen	Dunshaughlin
Slanduff	264	Skreen	Monktown	Navan
**Slane**	Town	Upper Slane	Slane	Navan
Slane	745	Upper Slane	Slane	Navan
Slanecastle Demesne	563	Upper Slane	Slane	Navan
Slanestown	141	Skreen	Rathfeigh	Dunshaughlin
Smithstown	518	Lower Duleek	Julianstown	Drogheda
Smithstown	294	Skreen	Killeen	Dunshaughlin
Smithstown	440	Upper Kells	Kilskeer	Kells
Sneeoge	236	Lower Duleek	Duleek	Drogheda
Spiddal	731	Morgallion	Nobber	Kells
Springhall	154	Fore	Moylagh	Oldcastle
Springvalley	308	Lower Moyfenrath	Laracor	Trim
Springville (or Dandlestown)	462	Upper Kells	Burry	Kells
Sranabell	432	Fore	Killallon	Oldcastle
St Johns Rath	157	Lower Kells	Staholmog	Kells
Stackallan	944	Upper Slane	Stackallan	Navan
Stadalt	382	Upper Duleek	Stamullin	Drogheda
Staffordstown	253	Ratoath	Ballymaglassan	Dunshaughlin
Staffordstown	616	Skreen	Staffordstown	Navan
Staffordstown Little	144	Ratoath	Ballymaglassan	Dunshaughlin
Stagreenan	130	Lower Duleek	Colp	Drogheda
Staholmog	576	Lower Kells	Staholmog	Kells
Stalleen	792	Lower Duleek	Donore	Drogheda
Stameen	361	Lower Duleek	Colp	Drogheda
**Stamullin**	Town	Upper Duleek	Stamullin	Drogheda
Stamullin	392	Upper Duleek	Stamullin	Drogheda
Starinagh	1,117	Upper Slane	Collon	Ardee
Steeplestown	155	Upper Navan	Trim	Trim
Stephenstown	372	Morgallion	Castletown	Navan
Stirrupstown	301	Fore	Killallon	Oldcastle
Stocks	236	Lune	Athboy	Trim
Stokesquarter	62	Morgallion	Castletown	Navan
Stokestown	212	Dunboyne	Dunboyne	Dunshaughlin
Stokestown	408	Lower Moyfenrath	Laracor	Trim
Stonefield	892	Fore	Oldcastle	Oldcastle
Stonehall	28	Lower Moyfenrath	Trim	Trim
Stonestown	407	Upper Navan	Moymet	Trim
Strany Beg	135	Lower Moyfenrath	Rathmolyon	Trim
Strany More	178	Lower Moyfenrath	Rathmolyon	Trim
Summerbank (or Drumsawry)	809	Fore	Loughcrew	Oldcastle
**Summerhill**	Town	Lower Moyfenrath	Laracor	Trim
Summerhill	176	Lower Moyfenrath	Laracor	Trim
Summerhill Demesne	755	Lower Moyfenrath	Laracor	Trim
Summerhill Lower	195	Lower Slane	Loughbrackan	Ardee
Summerhill Upper	493	Lower Slane	Loughbrackan	Ardee
Summerstown	456	Lower Moyfenrath	Laracor	Trim
Sutherland	182	Ratoath	Crickstown	Dunshaughlin
Swainstown	321	Lower Deece	Kilmessan	Dunshaughlin
Tanderagee	273	Lower Moyfenrath	Rathmolyon	Trim
Tankardrath	134	Morgallion	Kilberry	Navan
Tankardstown	93	Upper Duleek	Clonalvy	Drogheda
Tankardstown	123	Ratoath	Ratoath	Dunshaughlin
Tankardstown	568	Lower Navan	Donaghpatrick	Navan
Tankardstown	691	Upper Slane	Gernonstown	Navan
**Tara**	Town	Skreen	Tara	Navan
Tatestown	339	Upper Kells	Donaghpatrick	Navan
Teevurcher	469	Lower Kells	Moybolgue	Kells
Teltown	626	Upper Kells	Teltown	Kells
**The Little Furze**	Town	Skreen	Athlumney	Navan
Thomastown	226	Lower Duleek	Duleek	Drogheda
Thomastown	187	Ratoath	Dunshaughlin	Dunshaughlin
Thomastown	417	Lower Kells	Kilbeg	Kells
Thomastown	593	Fore	Loughcrew	Oldcastle
Thurstianstown	882	Lower Duleek	Painestown	Navan
Ticroghan	1,409	Upper Moyfenrath	Clonard	Edenderry
Timlins	36	Upper Deece	Moyglare	Dunshaughlin
Timoole	535	Skreen	Timoole	Dunshaughlin
Tinrawinnea	160	Lower Kells	Moybolgue	Kells
Tirachorka	189	Lower Kells	Moybolgue	Kells
Tobertynan	747	Lower Moyfenrath	Rathmolyon	Trim
Toberultan	147	Upper Kells	Burry	Kells
Toor	468	Upper Moyfenrath	Castlejordan	Edenderry
Toornafolla	123	Upper Moyfenrath	Castlejordan	Edenderry
Towas	357	Lower Kells	Kilmainham	Kells
Towlaght	723	Upper Moyfenrath	Clonard	Edenderry
Town Parks	1,198	Upper Kells	Kells	Kells
Town Parks	267	Lune	Athboy	Trim
Townparks	324	Lower Navan	Navan	Navan
Townparks North	64	Upper Navan	Trim	Trim
Townparks South	35	Lower Moyfenrath	Trim	Trim
Tremblestown	427	Upper Navan	Trim	Trim
Trevet	731	Skreen	Trevet	Dunshaughlin
Trevet Grange	537	Ratoath	Trevet	Dunshaughlin
**Trim**	Town	Lower Moyfenrath	Trim	Trim
**Trim**	Town	Upper Navan	Trim	Trim
Trohanny	493	Lower Kells	Moynalty	Kells
Tromman	632	Lower Moyfenrath	Rathmolyon	Trim
Trubley	471	Lower Deece	Trubley	Trim
Tubbrid	662	Fore	Killeagh	Oldcastle
Tubride	346	Fore	Oldcastle	Oldcastle
Tuiterath	202	Lower Duleek	Kentstown	Navan
Tullaghanoge	1,183	Upper Navan	Tullaghanoge	Trim
Tullaghanstown	726	Upper Navan	Clonmacduff	Trim
Tullaghmedan	477	Lower Deece	Derrypatrick	Dunshaughlin
Tullog	508	Upper Duleek	Stamullin	Drogheda
Tully	102	Fore	Killeagh	Oldcastle
Tullyard	161	Upper Navan	Trim	Trim
Tullyarran	89	Lower Kells	Moynalty	Kells
Tullyattin	219	Lower Kells	Moynalty	Kells
Tullykane	141	Lower Deece	Kilmessan	Dunshaughlin
Tullypole	232	Lower Kells	Moynalty	Kells
Tullyweel	175	Lower Kells	Kilmainham	Kells
Turkstown	143	Upper Kells	Dulane	Kells
Twentypark	174	Ratoath	Ratoath	Dunshaughlin
Ughtyneill	172	Lower Kells	Moynalty	Kells
Umberstown Great	437	Lower Moyfenrath	Laracor	Trim
Umberstown Little	155	Lower Moyfenrath	Laracor	Trim
Veldonstown	339	Lower Duleek	Kentstown	Navan
Vesingstown	415	Dunboyne	Dunboyne	Dunshaughlin
Vessingstown	230	Upper Navan	Tullaghanoge	Trim
Volvenstown	88	Upper Kells	Balrathboyne	Kells
Walterstown	144	Dunboyne	Dunboyne	Dunshaughlin
Walterstown	417	Lower Kells	Moynalty	Kells
Walterstown	356	Skreen	Monkstown	Navan
Walterstown	284	Lower Deece	Galtrim	Trim
Wardstown	631	Lune	Athboy	Trim
Warrenstown	270	Upper Deece	Culmullin	Dunshaughlin
Warrenstown	417	Dunboyne	Dunboyne	Dunshaughlin
Warrenstown	701	Lower Deece	Knockmark	Dunshaughlin
Warrenstown	127	Ratoath	Rathbeggan	Dunshaughlin
Waterside Great	218	Skreen	Rathfeigh	Dunshaughlin
Waterside Little	130	Skreen	Rathfeigh	Dunshaughlin
Waynestown	263	Ratoath	Ballymaglassan	Dunshaughlin
Weatherstown	70	Upper Deece	Kilmore	Dunshaughlin
Weymourstown White	246	Upper Kells	Kilskeer	Kells
Whistlemount	72	Lower Navan	Liscartan	Navan
Whitecommons	100	Upper Kells	Kells	Kells
Whitecross	54	Upper Duleek	Ballygarth	Drogheda
Whitecross Glebe	8	Upper Duleek	Moorechurch	Drogheda
Whitehall	42	Upper Navan	Trim	Trim
Whiteleas	153	Upper Duleek	Stamullin	Drogheda
Whitesland	40	Dunboyne	Dunboyne	Dunshaughlin
Whitewood	500	Morgallion	Nobber	Kells
**Wilkinstown**	Town	Morgallion	Kilberry	Navan
Wilkinstown	175	Ratoath	Rathbeggan	Dunshaughlin
Wilkinstown	900	Morgallion	Kilberry	Navan
Williamstown	277	Upper Kells	Dulane	Kells
Williamstown	106	Morgallion	Drakestown	Navan
Williamstown	194	Fore	Diamor	Oldcastle
Williamstown (or Bawn)	265	Lower Navan	Ardsallagh	Navan
Wilmount	51	Upper Kells	Dulane	Kells
Windtown	258	Lower Navan	Donaghmore	Navan
Windtown	211	Lower Deece	Galtrim	Trim
Woodcockstown	260	Upper Deece	Culmullin	Dunshaughlin
Woodland	211	Ratoath	Rathregan	Dunshaughlin
Woodpark	211	Dunboyne	Dunboyne	Dunshaughlin
Woodpole	343	Upper Kells	Castlekeeran	Kells
Woodpole	343	Upper Kells	Loughan or Castlekeeran	Kells
Woodside	34	Upper Navan	Trim	Trim
Woodtown	947	Upper Deece	Culmullin	Dunshaughlin
Woodtown	124	Lune	Athboy	Trim
Woodtown	19	Lune	Kildalkey	Trim
Woodtown (Abbott)	392	Lune	Kildalkey	Trim
Woodtown Lower	201	Lower Slane	Siddan	Ardee
Woodtown Upper	349	Lower Slane	Siddan	Ardee
Woodtown West	260	Lune	Kildalkey	Trim
Wotton	317	Ratoath	Donaghmore	Dunshaughlin
Wrightstown (or Ardbrackan)	258	Lower Deece	Scurlockstown	Trim
**Yellow Furze**	Town	Lower Duleek	Painestown	Navan
Yellow Island	16	Lower Duleek	Donore	Drogheda
Yellow Walls	152	Upper Navan	Moymet	Trim
Yellowleas	131	Morgallion	Castletown	Navan
Yellowshar	56	Skreen	Kilmoon	Dunshaughlin
