= Balrath Demesne =

Townland in County Meath, Ireland

Coordinates: 53°42′16″N 6°55′24″W

Balrath Demesne (Irish: Diméin Bhaile na Rátha) is a townland in County Meath, Ireland. It is located 4 km (2.5 mi) southwest of the town of Kells. Its population was 36 in 2011. The wall of an ancient chapel and a cemetery remain here, on the grounds of the former estate, Balrath Bury.

== Geography ==
Balrath Demesne is the 54th largest townland in County Meath and has an area of approximately 1.66 square miles (1,060 acres). It falls within the electoral division of Burry, in the civil parish of Burry, and the barony of Upper Kells. To the west are the townlands of Drumbaragh, Springville or Dandlestown (Danllestown), and Balgeeth. Townlands which border it to the east include Barfordstown, Garistown, Irishtown, Rafeehan and Toberultan. Chapelbride is to the north and Ethelstown and Rodstown to the south.

== History ==
In Irish, Balrath translates to bal for "home" and ráth for the "enclosing bank" of a ringfort, which is an ancient dwelling structure(s) found in great numbers across Ireland. A demesne is land used exclusively by the lord of a manor. Balrath also translates as "town of the fort."

=== Burry parish ===
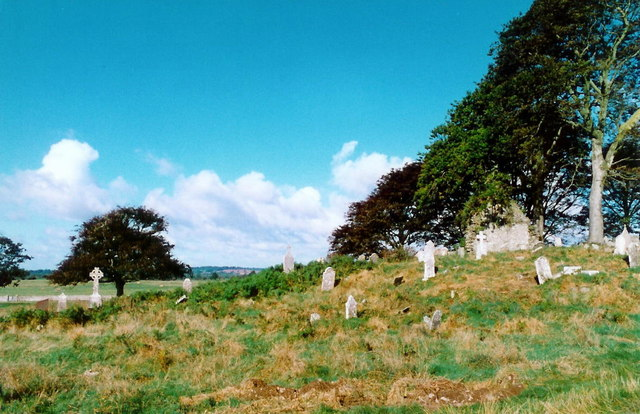
'Burry,' a parish. Chapel-of-ease to Kells and graveyard at Balrath Demesne townland

Balrath Demesne is within the larger parish of Burry. From Lewis's Topographical Dictionary of Ireland, 1837:

BURRY, a parish, in the barony of UPPER-KELLS, county of MEATH, and province of LEINSTER, 1¾ mile (S.W.) from Kells; containing 1027 inhabitants. This parish is situated on the road from Mullingar to Kells and Drogheda, and comprises 3339 statute acres, as applotted under the tithe act. The land, which is of great fertility, is almost equally divided between tillage and pasture, and the system of agriculture is in a highly improved state. There is a considerable tract of bog, which partly supplies the town of Kells with turf; and there are some quarries of limestone and greenstone. Balrath, the seat of C. A. Nicholson, Esq., is a handsome residence, pleasantly situated in an extensive and well-wooded demesne, with a park well stocked with deer, and in which are some remains of the old church, with a burial-ground attached. The other seats are Springville, the residence of P. O'Reilly, Esq.; and Berford, of J. Dyas, Esq. It is a rectory, in the diocese of Meath, and is part of the union of Kells and corps of the archdeaconry of Meath: the tithes amount to £150 The glebe comprises 2r. 19p., valued at £1. 10. per annum. In the R. C. divisions, also, it forms part of the union or district of Kells. There are two daily pay schools, one at Drumbarrow and the other at Scurlogstown, in which are about 100 boys and 60 girls.

=== Bury chapel and cemetery ===
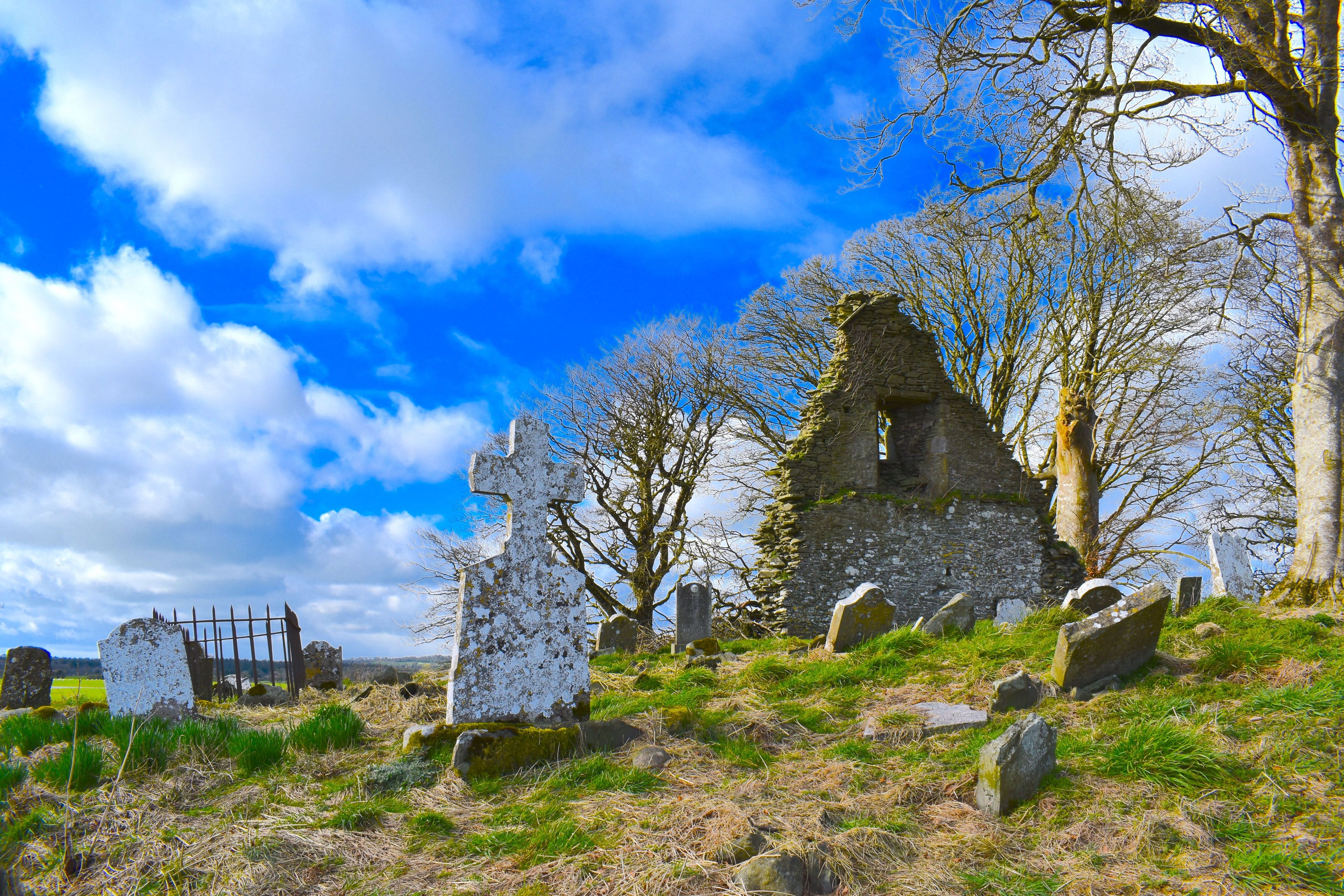
Bury chapel in March 2020 (ruin dating to pre-1622) and cemetery in the Balrath Demesne townland

Bury was a Catholic chapel-at-ease to Kells (a small church to make it easier for parishioners to attend services) on a slight rise on a level landscape, as noted in 1622 (Ussher's visitation). "According to Dopping's Visitation (1682-5) the parish church of Bury, dedicated to the Blessed Virgin Mary, had been a ruin since 1641 and was not enclosed (Ellison 1973, 9). The church is depicted as a roofed structure on the 1836 ed. of the OS 6-inch map, although described as mere remains (Lewis 1837, vol. 1, 234)."

In 1877, a "license for public worship" was approved for "an iron church" erected by the "late John Nicholson" at Balrath Burry.

Members of the Church of Ireland and the Catholic Church in Ireland are buried in the graveyard here. The cemetery predates 1722, the burial year on one of the many headstones that were catalogued in 2012 by the Kells Archeological and History Society. Here lie the remains of Maureen O'Hara's grandfather, a blacksmith and farrier named Batholomew Fitzsimons. She made a ceremonial visit in 2012 at age 92.

== See also ==
- List of townlands of County Meath
