= Springville, County Meath =

Townland in County Meath, Ireland

Coordinates: 53°42′23″N 6°57′33″W

Springville or Dandlestown (Danllestown) is a townland in County Meath, Ireland. It is located about 3.5 miles southwest of the town of Kells.

== Description ==
Springville is 0.32 square miles with 206.58 acres / 206 acres, 2 rods, 12 perches, making it the 1010th largest townland in County Meath. It is in the electoral division of Burry, in the civil parish of Burry, in the barony of Upper Kells, and shares its northern border with the townland of Drumbaragh, including the historical village of Light Town (Leightown).

Its population was 281 in 2022. It once comprised some 462 acres and 34 perches (1836 Ordnance Survey Map) but parts were absorbed into the adjacent townland, Balrath Demesne.

It was once the seat of Philip O'Reilly (1787-1855), of Springville House. However, much of its acreage was under the ownership of the Nicholson family, of Balrath Bury, in the townland of Balrath Demesne, in the 19th and early 20th centuries.
