= Drumbaragh =

Townland in County Meath

Coordinates: 53°43′31″N 6°56′30″W

Drumbaragh or Drumbarrow or Boherboy (Irish: Droim Bearach, meaning 'shorn hill' or 'grazed or bare ridge') is a townland and village in County Meath, Ireland, 5.2 kilometres (3.2 miles) west of the town of Kells. The townland had a population of 180 in 2011. The Drumbaragh Emmets Gaelic football club (GFC) represents the area.

== Geography ==
Drumbaragh is located at 53° 43' 31" N, 6° 56' 30" W. Drumbaragh townland has an area of approximately 345.37 hectares (3.5 km^{2}). It is in the electoral division of Boherboy, civil parish of Kells and barony of Upper Kells.

The townland borders the following townlands: Balnagon Lower to the west, Balnagon Upper to the west, Balrath Demesne to the south, Boolies to the east, Calliaghstown to the east, Castlekeeran to the west, Castlepole to the north, Chapelbride to the east, Commons of Lloyd to the east, Destinrath to the east and Springville or Danllestown to the west.

On the Griffith's maps of the 1850s, the area is marked as Boherboy.

== History ==
In Irish, Drumbaragh or “Drumbhcarra” translates to “shaven or shorn ridge” or “the ford of the high ridge.” There is a holy stone in a field, called St. Patrick's Stone. Tradition has it that the stone “is shadowed by an aged hawthorn,” and on the stone's top, “a large hollow is always filled with water by rain or dew. It has great healing powers.” The townland contains the historical village of Light Town (Leightown).

=== Prehistory ===
In numerous studies in response to the construction of the M3 Clonee–North of Kells Motorway Scheme on behalf of Meath County Council, researchers in Drumbaragh in 2008 found "unenclosed, Late Neolithic structures of approximately 2900–2500 BC," and burnt stone activity in the area dating to the Bronze Age. This included several Fulacht Fiadh, or burnt mounds—the ancient charcoal and stone pits used to boil meat and heat water that are found in the thousands across the country. Researchers found isolated lintel graves here as well, possibly representing solitary graves of Christians buried away from ecclesiastical contexts in the early medieval period of the 7th century. There is a ritual site of a holy well here dating from the 5th to the 16th centuries and ringforts that functioned as residences and/or farmsteads and broadly date from 500 to 1000 AD.

=== Drumbaragh House ===
In 1649, Major Benjamin Woodward led troops from Chester, England, to Ireland, under Oliver Cromwell, after which he was granted a spoil in victory: about 450 acres and a castle in County Meath at what was called Drumbarrow, made official in 1668. The lands were confiscations from the Hill and Plunkett families. A plaque in St. Columba's Church at Kells commemorates Charles Woodward (1740–93), a minister in the Church of Ireland and rector of Ardee, who inherited the castle in 1761.

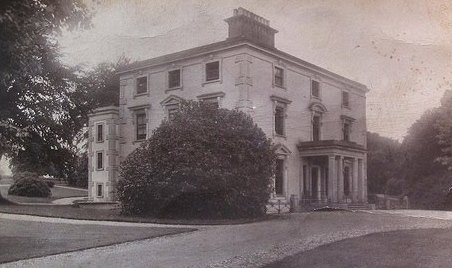
Drumbaragh House, Co Meath, about 1911

The castle was replaced around 1800 by Drumbaragh House, a four-square, three-story Georgian featuring a prominent chimneystack that remains today. It was erected for Henry Woodward, son of Benjamin and Esther, who married Sarah-Catherine Wade of Clonabreany. Their second son, Robert Woodward (1805–1864), succeeded in 1838 until his death when the property went to the Landed Estates Court.

Irish politician John Sweetman, one of the founders of Sinn Féin, acquired the property in 1869. He reportedly gave all of his tenants "leases forever" and erected "comfortable houses" for his laborers.

Drumbaragh House was described, in 1835, "as a neat house of two storeys and basement, surrounded by a well cared small demesne. There were considerable offices. A school house stood not far from the house in the 1830s."

More recently, it is categorized as a protected structure by the Meath County Council, described as "three storey over basement house built about 1800, attributed to designs by Francis Johnston, remodelled in late 1860s by William Caldbeck, extended to the rear about 1900. Includes gate lodge, walled garden."

Today, Drumbaragh House is home to Drumbaragh Stud, which breeds, breaks and trains racehorses.

=== Drumbaragh School ===
The Drumbaragh School, an existing protected structure, is a "detached four-bay single-storey former national school, built about 1850, with pair of gabled porches. Canted window to east gable. Pitched patterned slate roofs with rendered chimneystacks and cast-iron finials."

=== 19th century ===
With the stock of potatoes diminishing weekly and increasing food prices in the early years of the Great Hunger, in June 1846, about 50 men were engaged in "road levelling at Drumbarragh;" they were among the 500 employed in the Kells baronies at that time. The Carolan family lived on the Woodward estate at Drumbaragh, near the village of Springville, and on the Nicholson estate at Balrath Demesne, in the 18th and 19th centuries. In 1847, several members of the Carolan family emigrated from the estates to Willow Grove, Pennsylvania in the United States.

The population in Drumbaragh fell significantly, by 67 per cent, between 1841 and 1851 and from 144 inhabitants in 1841 to 58 inhabitants in 1871.

In the adjacent townland of Springville, or Dandlestown, also known as Light Town (Leightown), the population fell 54 per cent between 1841 and 1851. There were fifty houses in Springville in 1841 and only eleven left in 1871, a 73 percent decline.

Significant evictions of tenantry on the Nicholson estate at Balrath Bury (which included part of Drumbaragh) occurred in 1862, 1871 and 1872. According to Irish Folklore Commission interviews of local residents in the 1930s, throughout the Great Hunger, specifically between 1847 and 1862, John A. Nicholson (1798–1872) "helped numbers [of residents] to emigrate [to, presumably, the United States and/or Great Britain]" and "their houses were demolished, except houses in which old people lived who were unable to travel."

=== 20th century ===
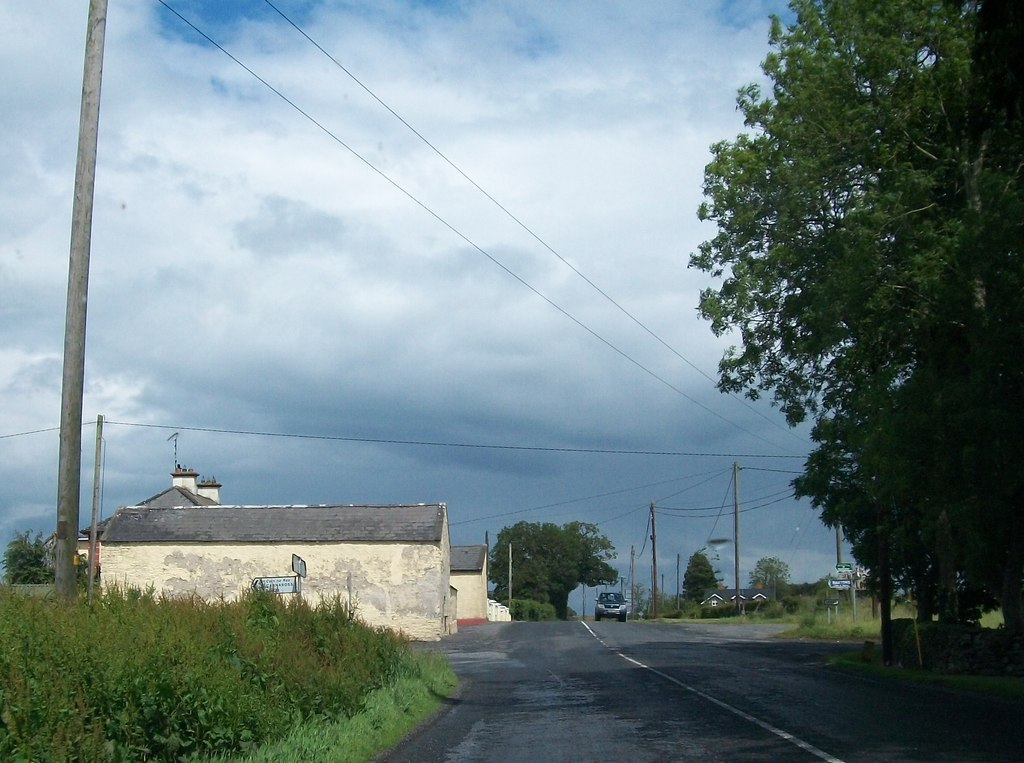
Farm outbuildings at Drumbaragh cross roads on the R163

The Drumbaragh Volunteers were formed in 1915 in support of independence from Britain and were at the Hill of Tara Easter 1916. John Sweetman was "one of the first Irish men to speak out against conscription in 1915," which led to his arrest at Drumbaragh following the Easter Rising.

On April 1, 1921, in adjacent townland Balnagon Lower, the Sylvan Park ambush took place.

On June 7, 1921, the Carnaross Company of the Meath Brigade "decided to carry out an ambush at Drumbaragh on the border of the company area." Five men in the British Army were reportedly injured. After placing a mine in the road, the men drew back of a high wall that overlooked the road.

"When a lorry load of military came along, the mine was exploded and the ambush party opened fire. As the military in the lorry replied to the fire, a second load of military followed. The ambush party withdrew across Sweetman's gardens in the direction of Kieran and Carnaross. Jack Lynch, a postman and one of the attacking party, was wounded in the retreat. An hour later, Matt Tevlin, who was in charge of the attack, took off his coat while in a field nearby and pretended to be counting cattle. He returned to the position and got into conversation with the military, who were still at the scene."

The Drumbaragh Emmets Gaelic football club (GFC) was formed in late 1939.
