= Since September =

Pop vocal band

- Also known as: S9
- Origin: Ireland/United Kingdom
- Genre: Pop rock
- Years active: 2020–2022
- Past members: Harry Holles; Matthew Nolan; Patrick Ralphson; Jacob Fowler

Since September were a three-piece English-Irish pop rock band, formed in 2020. The group consisted of Matthew Nolan, Harry Holles, Patrick Ralphson and formerly Jacob Fowler. The group was formed on and subsequently won English girl group Little Mix's BBC One talent competition Little Mix The Search, which made them the opening act for Little Mix's seventh concert tour the Confetti Tour (2022). The band released four standalone singles and were managed by Roy Stride.

== History ==
=== 2020: Formation and Little Mix: The Search ===
In 2020, the English-Irish boy band was formed on BBC One's talent competition Little Mix: The Search, following the 'vocal and instrument' group auditions. After their formation the group spent time living together for 8 weeks, while competing on the show. From the submitted online auditions Little Mix picked the best singers who could also play instruments, including Ralphson, Holles, Nolan and Fowler. Thereafter the boys all auditioned individually on the show, face to face with Little Mix as their judges. Each of them passed their audition and met up in the band room. Once all contestants were gathered in the band room they passed to the rehearsal stage where they got evaluated once more while singing as a collective. After they, along with other contestants made it through the evaluation they performed in front of a live stage and the final line up of the vocal and instrument group was decided, consisting of the four.

When all six groups were formed, the Battle of the Bands began, and the group announced its name "Since September" since the group was formed in September. After performing a rock version of "I Knew You Were Trouble" by Taylor Swift, the group received 21 points from Jade Thirlwall, 21 points from Leigh-Anne Pinnock, 22 points from Perrie Edwards and 20 points from Jesy Nelson, with 100 points max and each girl handing out 25 points max, the group received 84% of the maximum number of points, making them rank fourth place in the battle of the bands and enabling them to proceed to the Semi-Final.

In the Semi-Finals, after having a pep talk with McFly, the group performed "Watermelon Sugar" by Harry Styles. They ranked 4th place in the leaderboard once more with 89% this time, receiving 22 points from Pinnock, 23 points from Thirlwall, 21 points from Nelson and 23 points from Edwards. They ranked in the bottom along with New Priority, thus they had to battle against them to stay in the competition. In the sing-off, they performed "Before You Go" by Lewis Capaldi, accompanied by their instruments. The cover saved them and allowed them to move forward to the final.

For their first performance in the final, Since September performed a mashup of "Don't Look Back in Anger" by Oasis and "Survivor" by Destiny's Child. Although the judges' votes did not matter in the final compared to the public votes, Edwards and Pinnock gave Since September a score of 93% for their first performance while Thirlwall gave them a score of 94%. Their second and last performance was a mash up of "Drag me Down" by One Direction and "Old Town Road" by Lil Nas X. For this mash up they received a score of 100% from each of the girls, minus Nelson who was absent during the finals. In the leaderboard for the finals Since September were ranked third but won ultimately due to the public vote where they garnered the most votes.

By winning the competition the band won not only the prize of being Little Mix's opening act in their next tour, but also gained access to Little Mix's inner circle who have contributed to their success, including vocal coaches, songwriters and producers.

=== 2021-2022: Concert tours and original music ===
The Empty Seats Tour, released on 7 May 2021 on BBC One, is a three-part web series. The series came on when Andrea Hamilton, founder of ModestTV, contacted the band and told them there was an opportunity to document the band as they embark on a tour with one striking attribute: They are playing at some of the UK's most iconic venues, but in front of empty seats rather than sold-out crowds. BBC stated that the series is a preparation for their prize to support Little Mix on their postponed Corona-restricted nationwide tour in 2022. The Empty Seats Tour sees the boys play at Coventry's Ricoh Arena, Salford Lad's Club in Greater Manchester, and a finishing performance at the rooftop of the Tate London along with a pit stop in Blackpool.

Following their Empty Seats Tour, the band announced their first public headline shows. An intimate tour around three venues in the UK, this time with filled seats. On 8 September 2021, they played in front of an audience in Notthingham in The Bodega, as well as venues at The Grace in London and The Deaf Institute in Manchester.

The group had also announced their first Single Let You Go which was officially released on 6 August. Those that pre-saved the single on Spotify had the chance to win a pair of tickets to their September Tour and meet the band.

On 5 November, the group announced their second single 11:11 which was released on 11 November.

On 30 January, the group announced their third single All The Broken Hearts which was released on 4 February.

While Since September supported Little Mix during the Confetti Tour, they played their new song All Of The Stars during the tour dates where they announced its release on 13 May.

On 15 April, Since September released 10 tour dates of their 2022 United Kingdom Tour on their social media accounts. The tour will start on 1 October and end on 18 October.

On 1 June, Fowler announced his departure from Since September. The group stated they would continue as a three-piece and proceed with their UK tour. However, three months later on 7 September, the group announced they were disbanding after the tour. The tour was reduced to four remaining dates and marked their farewell tour.

== Artistry ==
During Little Mix: The Search, Since September cited 5 Seconds of Summer, McFly, Jonas Brothers, Kings Of Leon and The Killers as their musical influences.

While Since September used a pop-rock style during the show, their manager Roy Stride revealed the band completely switched it up for their original music. He called their music a mature Sam Smith meets Ed Sheeran sound.

After the show, the boys wrote both together and with music artists such as Roy Stride, James McVey and The Dunwells. Having four different musical styles between them, the band has settled on a Coldplay-esk sound, focusing more on the ballad side of music.

== Members ==
- Harry Holles (born 15 February 1998) was born in Coventry and grew up in the suburb of Eastern Green. He attended Eastern Green Junior School and then West Coventry Academy (previously Woodlands Academy). He was a member of a band, the Commonjets, during his teen years.
- Matthew James Nolan (born 5 April 1999) was born in Dublin and grew up in Grange Rath, Drogheda. He attended Coláiste na hInse nearby in Bettystown. He was a member of Chord Celtic Football Club and has released music as a solo artist.
- Patrick Michael Ralphson (born 27 May 2000) is from the Burnley area, having grown up in Fence and later moved to Trawden. He was a member of Burnley Youth Theatre. He attended Wheatley Lane Primary School and then Ermysted's Grammar School before studying German and Politics at the University of Manchester. He was in an indie band Critical Reaction.
- Jacob Oliver Fowler (born 2 March 2000) was born in Nottingham and grew up in the suburb of Woodthorpe. He attended Trinity School Aspley and went on to graduate with a degree in Musical Theatre from the Trinity Laban Conservatoire of Music and Dance in London. Fowler left the Band in May 2022.

== Discography ==
=== Singles ===
Title	Year	Album
"Let You Go"	2021	Non-album singles
"11:11"	2021	Non-album singles
"All The Broken Hearts"	2022	Non-album singles
"All Of The Stars"	2022	Non-album singles

== Filmography ==
Year	Name	Role	Notes	Ref.
2020	Little Mix: The Search	Themselves	Winner, Season 1	
2021	The Empty Seats Tour	Themselves	Web series	

== Concert Tours ==
=== Headlining ===
- September Tour (2021)
- Since September 2022 UK Tour (2022)

=== Supporting ===
- Little Mix – The Confetti Tour (2022)

==== Festivals and gigs ====
- Relight Festival (2021)
- Irlam Live Festival (2021)
- Christmas Lights Switch On (2021)
- Social in the City (2021)
- Isle of Wight Festival
