= Conor Maguire =

Conor Maguire may refer to:

- Conor Maguire (judge) (1889–1971), Irish politician, lawyer and judge
- Conor Maguire (rugby union), Irish rugby union player

== See also ==
- Connor Maguire (disambiguation)
