= Mornington, County Meath =

Mornington Baile Uí Mhornáin (Irish)
- Village
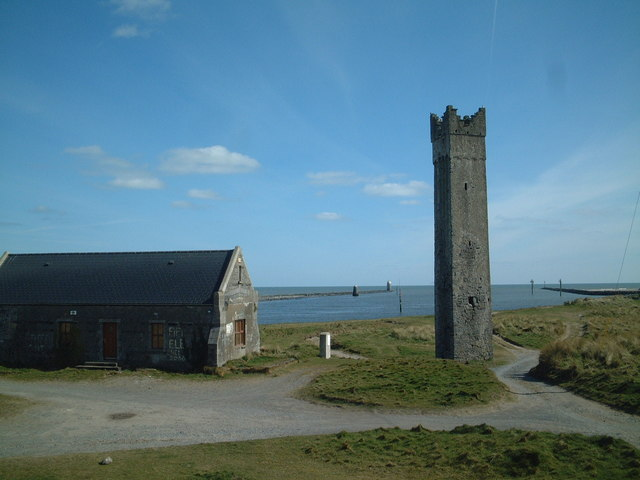
- Maiden Tower, Mornington, and Mouth of River Boyne

- Location in Ireland
- Coordinates: 53°43′17″N 6°17′2″W
- Country: Ireland
- Province: Leinster
- County: County Meath

Population (2022)
  - Total: 15,642
- Urban area of Laytown–Bettystown–Mornington–Donacarney
- Irish Grid Reference: O149759

Mornington (Irish: Baile Uí Mhornáin, meaning 'town of the mariner') is a coastal village on the estuary of the River Boyne in County Meath, Ireland approximately 5 km downriver from the centre of Drogheda. Together with the neighbouring villages of Laytown, Bettystown and Donacarney, it comprises the urban area of Laytown–Bettystown–Mornington–Donacarney with a combined population of 15,642 at the 2022 census.

The large townland of 1,223 acres (4.95 km^{2}) is bound on the north by the River Boyne estuary and on the east by the Irish Sea. The townland extends along the seashore to Bettystown village and includes part of that village up to and including The Neptune Hotel. The townland, part of the civil parish of Colpe, touches on other townlands: Betaghstown to the south, Colp East and Colp West to the west and Donacarney Great and Donacarney Little to the south and west. Stameen lies to the west. Baltray, Beaulieu and Banktown lie across the Boyne.

Mornington can also refer to a larger area, a half-parish, within the Laytown-Mornington Roman Catholic parish established in 1986, and formerly part of the parish of St. Mary's in Drogheda. Mornington was also a former post office sub-district and used by a wider area for address purposes up to the 1980s.

== Maiden Tower and the Lady's Finger ==
Situated on the south bank at the mouth of the River Boyne are two structures; the Maiden Tower, a watchtower, and; the Lady's Finger, a stone pillar. They served as navigational aids for ships entering the River Boyne prior to the 1765 walls being built. A ship approaching the river mouth would be lined up to safely enter the narrow channel when the view of the Lady's Finger was obscured behind the tower. The view of Maiden-Tower near Drogheda, Co:y Meath by S. Walker show their relationship on 11 June 1783. Both are listed in the Record of Protected Structures (ID Nos. MH021-124 and MH021-121) in the Meath County Development Plan 2013–2019.

The Maiden Tower, a square tower standing 60 foot high, tapering towards top, with an internal spiral staircase, was built during the reign of Elizabeth I, the Virgin Queen. The name's association with the queen, who came to the throne in 1558, is mentioned as a conjecture in his time by Sir William Wilde in his book The Beauties of the Boyne ... (1849). The tower was already in existence by 1582 when it was proposed to build at Ringsend a tower of "such height and strength as shall be of a perpetual continuance like the tower at Drogheda". The tower is mentioned in the Charter granted to the town of Drogheda by James 1st in 1609, in reference to the fisheries of the town: "we give grant and confirm to the Mayor, Sheriffs, Burgesses & Commons…all the water of the Boyne and the fishing and fisheries thence in within and on each side of the same water, from the waters of the franchises … from the west part of Drogheda to the sea beyond the tower called Maidenstower on the east side …". In the Down Survey of 1656–58, the tower is indicated as 'Maiden tower' on the county map and as 'Mayden Tower' on the map of Colp parish. In place of the Lady's Finger, both the barony and parish maps show a cross on a stepped plinth.

At a General Assembly of Drogheda Corporation on 11 January 1683 it was ordered that "Mr. Mayor cause Maiden Tower to be rough cast (i.e. rendered) at the chardge of the Corporation". In 1775, the Corporation petitioned the Lord Lieutenant regarding "... a tower called maiden Tower ... and also one other small tower...which towers are of singular service to mariners who navigate vessels bound to the port of Drogheda ... that same were now much out of repair and became less conspicuous, the bright colouring being worn off, that they had lately employed persons to repair said towers, but were obstructed by James Brabazon, tenant to Lord Mornington whose estate is contiguous to said towers".

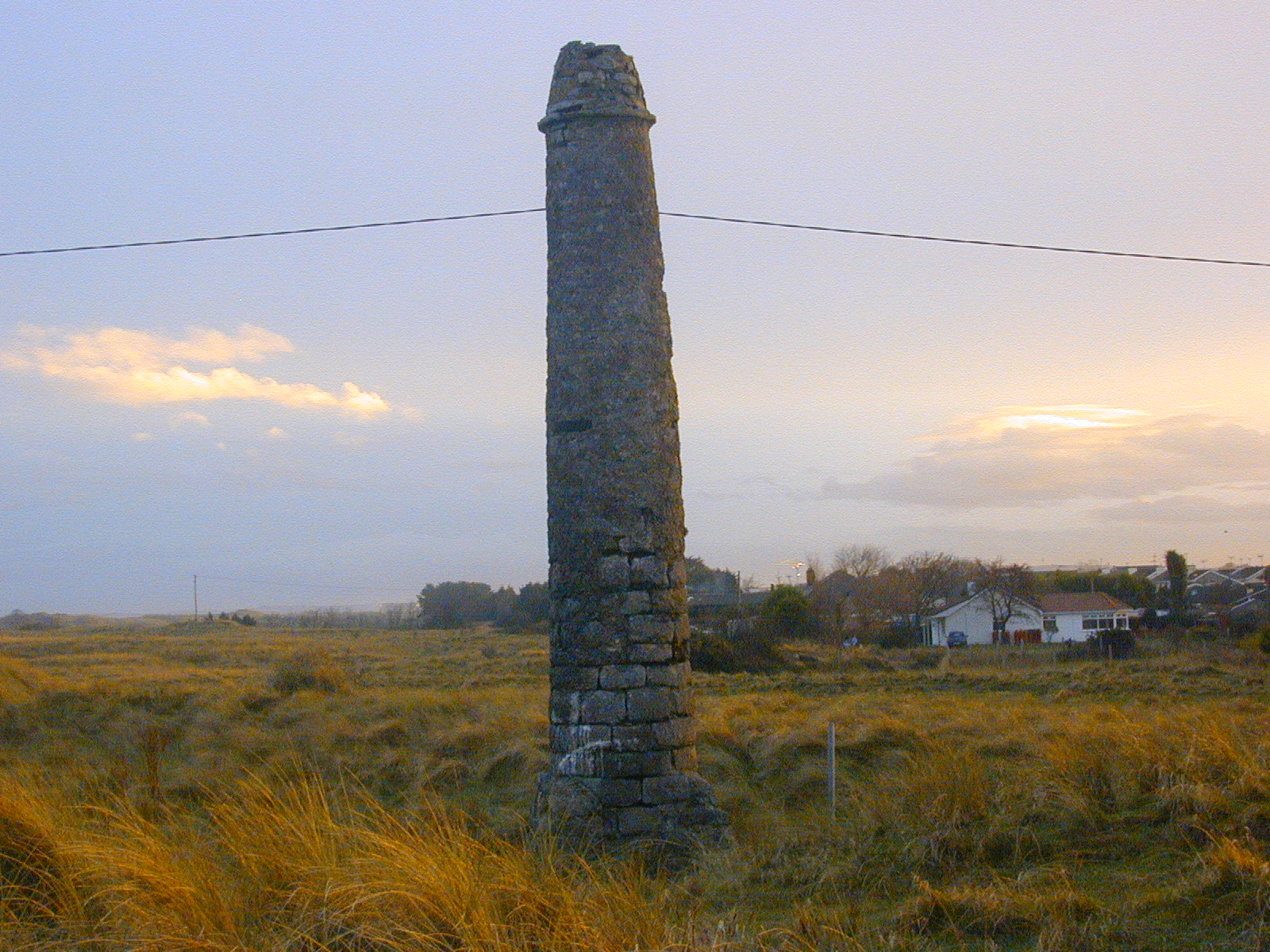
Lady's Finger

The tower was built as a warning beacon to sailors and marked the mouth of the River Boyne. At the topmost reaches of the tower, one can command an extensive view over land and sea. Access to this parapet is by spiral steps tapering towards the top and through the barrel-vault at the top of the stairs. It is believed also to have acted as a look-out tower during the Elizabethan Wars with Spain (1585–1603) to give warning of approaching enemy ships. Publicly accessible until the mid-1990s, when a metal grill was installed in the raised doorway, the tower was vandalised in 2003 when the metal grill was removed. A solid metal door was subsequently erected by the owners, blocking entry to the tower.

There are various folk stories about the tower and pillar. One, where a faithful lady, awaiting the return of her husband, falls from the tower when an incorrect flag on his returning ship mistakenly signalled his death, echoes the fate of Aegeus the father of Theseus. The lady's finger was then supposedly built by the returned husband in memory of his wife.

In 1819, a strange old woman who had lived abroad for many years took up residence at the top of the tower. She spent her time at her spinning wheel under a makeshift sail roof set up by local fishermen. She developed a reputation as a local hermit, donating her spinning work to the local church and having refused to give her name became known simply as the 'lady of the tower'. In the severe winter of 1821 she had to abandon the tower and died soon after in a charitable institution in Drogheda.

Beside the Maiden Tower is the former RNLI Lifeboat station, in operation between 1872 and 1926. A dwellinghouse until at least the late-1950s, it was subsequently derelict and roofless until 2003 when it was restored as a residence. In 2018 it was put up for sale in conjunction with the surrounding 31 acres of sand dunes on which a deepwater port had been proposed. The boathouse is a Protected Structure (ID No. MH021-123) in the Meath County Development Plan.

In 2015, Harvey Keitel filmed part of an insurance commercial at the tower.

== Fisheries and River Boyne ==
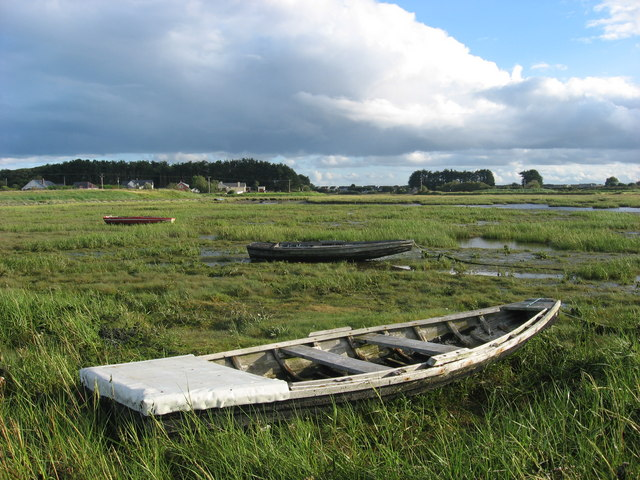
Traditional fishing boats at Mornington

Mornington was traditionally a fishing village on the River Boyne based on salmon fishing and mussel dredging, however the nature of the area and fishing livelihood changed significantly at the time of "The Boom". By tradition St. Patrick blessed the fishermen at Inbhear Colptha, were the Colpe (Colptha) stream enters the Boyne in Mornington, as they gave him salmon when he asked for something to eat, in contrast to those on the Ainge, or Nanny Water whom he had cursed for being inhospitable. He said then the Mornington fishermen would always have fish. The fishery was known as the lord's fishery by the early Stuart period and in 1603 King James granted Sir George Carew, vice-Chamberlain of the Queen "the tithes of the fish of Mornanston in the parish of Colpe". Drogheda was given and confirmed in its control of the Boyne and fisheries in 1609 (See above). One of the rights attached to holding the monastic lands of Beabeg under the grant at the time of King John (1199–1216) was the 'liberty of keeping a boat on the Boyne with fishing rights and rents out of Marinerstown (Mornington)'. This right passed to subsequent owners.

The fishing by draft nets was done from around 14 set stations and "Boyne salmon fishermen had a particular method of working which involved two men. One man stayed onshore holding a rope attached to the net, while the other rowed out into the river with the other end of the net. Once the whole net was spread out, the boatman rowed back to shore and the two men pulled the net to shore, trapping fish as it went". The salmon boats had a particular stern platform for holding the net. Fishing took place from February to August. In 2006 amid concerns of dwindling spawning salmon numbers, the decision was taken to ban draft net fishing. Of the 50 fishermen then with licenses only 14 remained on and "they came to an agreement with the Inland Fisheries Ireland to take part in a scientific experiment that tags fish caught in the nets, under the eye of fishing inspectors. They are then released, allowing them to head back upstream". Licences in former times were passed from father to son, with the equipment going with the licence. However current licences now run only for the life of the holder making them without commercial value and given the age profile of licence-holders and the delay in the resumption of fishing will inevitably lead to a situation where there are none left to resume the tradition.

The tradition of mussel fishing, which existed for about 300 years, has also been suspended since 2006. An initial halt took place in 1998, as the river channel was to be dredged, and while the beds were re-seeded the year afterwards with the expectation of harvesting in 2003 re-establishment was poor. Then in 2006, the Drogheda Port Company undertook a second silt dredging this time from Tom Roe's Point deepwater berth to the viaduct at Drogheda. The fishing involved a particular currach-style boat or punt (also called a pram, or more commonly locally, a canoe) and a mussel rake with a twenty-foot pole, dredged by hand similar to that on the River Conwy in North Wales. Mussels were originally used as a food source in the Mornington–Baltray areas and became a commercial fishery only about 1902–1903. The season ran over the winter from October to April and raking took place about two hours before and after low tide. The collected mussels then were shovelled through a sieve to remove stones and seaweed and bagged in Hessian sacks which were sent to a processing factory in Wexford. Most were afterwards packed and exported to France.

The point of land where the Boyne turns south-east before entering the sea is known locally as The Crook or Crooke, and in the nineteenth century, at the Maiden Tower a pool called the Long Reach, extending a quarter of a mile inland, was where vessels could lie at low water. A fish-meal factory was set up at the Crooke in 1968 by a Scottish concern with support from Bord Iascaigh Mhara to process fish from the herring industry out of Clogherhead and Skerries. Its construction impinged on the customary right of fishermen to draw their boats up at that point. It wound up in the late-1970s following several years of heavy fishing by vessels which led to herring stocks in the Irish Sea collapsing. The private jetty continued to be regularly used by fishing boats from Clogherhead to moor up and the company was finally liquidated in 2003. The Irish Government bought the jetty and adjoining lands in 2001 for £170,000 to retain its use as a licensed location to land explosives in commercial quantities, chiefly for local quarrying enterprises, and munitions.

Drogheda Port advanced plans to develop the mouth of the Boyne around the tower as a modern deepwater port facility in the late 1990s but the inability to locate the owner of the old boathouse there delayed the project. A reservation strip for a road corridor had already been laid into the County Meath development plan of the area which disallowed residential building along the proposed route from the Dublin Road. There was local opposition to the project until the lands were designated as the Boyne Estuary (1996) and Boyne Coast and Estuary SACs (Special Areas of Conservation) by Dúchas and this put paid to the plans. However initial dredging of the river channel took place in 1999–2000, and after renewed dredging in the channel of the river in 2006 the deepwater container and general cargo facility at Tom Roe's Point Terminal went ahead with EU money. Plans for a larger East Meath deep-water port shifted to the Gormanston/Bremore area at the same time. Thereafter much of the Mornington area in 2005 was rezoned by Meath County Council and has since been developed for new residential estates which changed the essentially rural nature of the area.

The management of the River Boyne estuary channel by the Drogheda Harbour Commissioners (1790–1997) and their commercial successor Drogheda Port Company, since 1997, has been a feature of the last 150 years, with major dredging work beginning in the 1830s following the Alexander Nimmo report of 1826. This report was based on a survey of the estuary undertaken by John Benjamin Macneill. A recent EPA report states that "From Drogheda town to the sea at Mornington, the river has been trained by means of training walls constructed around the 1850s by the then Drogheda Harbour Commissioners. This captured the main river flow with estuarine polders being created north and south of the training walls. This important work had two effects in that it increased the tidal exit velocity and thereby produced a scouring effect and created a reserve of water from the estuarine polders to supplement the falling tide". As part of this engineering, the old bridge at Mornington previously had a flood gate which restricted tidal water entering the Colpe stream.

== Public transport ==
Bus Éireann route D1 and D2 provide several daily services between Laytown and Drogheda via Bettystown and Mornington. Matthews Coaches provide commuter routes to Dublin which serve Donacarney Cross and Laytown, Bettystown and Julianstown. Mornington is served by rail by both Drogheda train station and Laytown train station.

== Religion ==
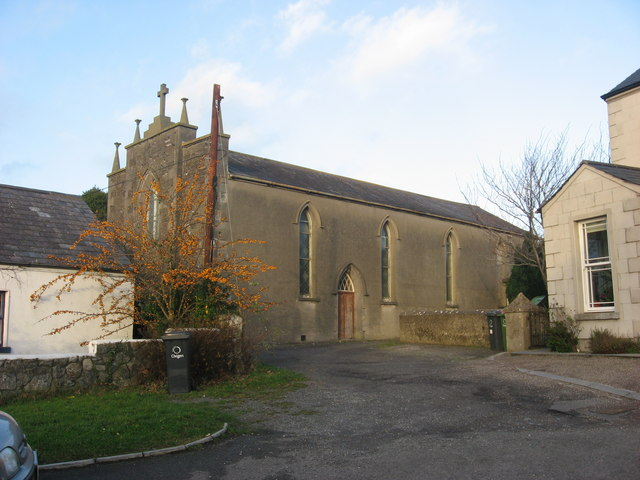
Old Star of the Sea church of 1841

There is a Roman Catholic church in Mornington which was dedicated 27 August 1989 as the Star of the Sea (Irish: Réalt ná Mara) with work completed in 1991. It was designed by Drogheda-based Turlough McKevitt Architects and built by M. J. Duffy & Sons Ltd. Since the establishment of the Laytown–Mornington parish in 1986 the curate in Mornington has acted in a supportive capacity to the parish priest in Laytown.

The 1989 church replaced a previous 'Star of the Sea' church, built 1841, in the centre of the original village close to the river. It was reported in July 2026 that a Serbian Orthodox Church community had purchased the old church for €135,000 and would open for liturgies after a two-year refurbishment.

The church building of 1841 is gabled-fronted, its main entrance facing the West, with a date plaque set above the door. It also had a side entrance on the South side which was more commonly used. The church was built in the Gothic Revival style under the supervision of Thomas Hammond of Drogheda in 1839–1841 for the Rev. John Donnellan of St. Mary's Parish on the buff overlooking the bridge at Mornington were a stream enters the Boyne. Inside the church on both sides of the main entrance, between the inner and outer doors, narrow curved stairs led up to the "Gallery". This was a slanting upper floor covering just over half of the church space. Here the choir sat and latecomers could sneak in after mass had started. A large confessional box was located on the right towards the rear under this floor. The church originally had the traditional ad orientem altar mounted into the East wall and following changes in the liturgy a later versus populum altar as well. A door to the sacristy led off to the right from the altar. Stained glass windows of the patron saints were transferred to the new church.

A graveyard is located between the 1841 church and river and holds old tombs of the Bellew and Talbot families. This church site had previously been the location of a small Penal-era chapel and beside it the ruins of a pre-Reformation church listed in the ecclesiastical taxation (1302–06) of Pope Nicholas IV. It was first recorded being a ruin in 1622, and part of its remains, the West gable end wall with a turret atop pierced for two bells, can still be found in the old graveyard adjoining. The anonymous illustration "Mornington", an engraved vignette on the title page of 'Life and campaigns of the Duke of Wellington'. Vol. I shows the old church and chapel before the building of the church of 1841. A chapel at Mornington is mentioned c. 1192–1202 in a Llanthony Charter.

St. Patrick is said to have landed here at hostium Colpdi, the port or haven of Colpa at the mouth of the Boyne, tied up his boats and continued on his way to Slane along the south bank of the Boyne, though the church, and the former Church of Ireland church at Colp, were traditionally dedicated to St. Columba. An undated life of St. Samthann of Cluain Bronaig mentions Colpe as a port used by boats from the Columban centre of Iona. This association can still be seen in the name of the local GAA Club, St. Colmcilles.

The Martyrology of Tallaght, compiled c. 800 A.D., mentions a Saint Aithcáin of Inber Colptha, nar' clói chathgreim ('whom no battle-might vanquished'), whose feast-day was 16 June. Any local tradition of him has gone.

Devotion to another or alternative June saint, John the Baptist, 24 June, probably came with the Normans who were particularly attached to his cult. A former holy well dedicated to St. John is located in a marshy and wooded area known as "The Glen" near the new church. It is situated close to the Colpe stream at the base of a hill called Cnoc Bán. Its pattern was observed, until suppressed by a local priest, "up to the turn of the [twentieth] century by people seeking cures for eye and ear ailments. Buttons, pieces of clothing and other personal items were hung on an elder bush overhanging the well. Local tradition claimed that the herbs growing around the well had the virtue of curing coughs, skin infections and deafness". The well has a wall surround built into the side of the hill but is now choked with debris. A stone known as the mass rock stood beside the well. Mass was celebrated in this isolated location during the difficult times when the Penal Laws were in force. Traditionally wells dedicated to the saint in Ireland held a patron/pattern day on St John's Eve (23 June) coinciding with the ancient celebration of mid-summer.

Current burials in the parish take place in Reilig Mhuire (Piltown Road Cemetery) which was opened in 1985.

== Sport ==
Laytown and Bettystown Golf Club is situated in Mornington townland.

St. Colmcilles, or Naomh Colmcille, is the local GAA club. Their facilities are located at Páirc Uí Rís in Piltown, near Bettystown. Known as the "Blues", the club was founded in 1971 with the merger of earlier clubs 'Star of the Sea' and 'Shallon' in the East Meath area.

Laytown and Bettystown Lawn Tennis Club, Golflinks Road, Bettystown, is also situated in Mornington.

== Education ==
There is one primary school split into a girls and boys school in Donacarney which service Mornington. They are Realt Na Mara BNS and Realt Na Mara GNS. Mornington is home to Drogheda Educate Together Secondary School on Mill Road. The area is also served by nearby secondary schools such as Coláiste na hInse in Bettystown.

In 1837, a school of about 20 children was located in the 'small chapel at Mornington'. A neo-Gothic style red-brick school which now serves as the local community centre was built in the 1870s at Donacarney Cross. Designed in 1872-3 by P.J. Dodd of Drogheda, with an extension in 1885, it features separate doors for girls and boys at the front of the building. Its twentieth-century replacement, with a water tower, was demolished to make the site available for the present-day schools in the early 2010s.

== Artists ==
The area has inspired many artists over the years. Views of the estuary and its fishermen, the beach and the Maiden Tower appear as subjects in watercolour, illustration and oils by various artists including Austin Cooper, Alexander Williams, Nano Reid, Ithell Colquhoun and more recently Richard Moore.

An illustration drawn of the 'Mouth of the Boyn' in 1746–47 by Thomas Wright (1711–1786), which shows the Maiden Tower and Lady's Finger, appeared in Book II. of Louthiana, published in 1748. Two other early illustrations are "Views of Maiden-Tower near Drogheda, Co:y Meath" by Austin Cooper in 1782 and "The lady's Finger & Maiden Tower, Co. of Eastmeath" an engraving, based on a sketch by George Petrie, appearing as a plate in antiquary Thomas Cromwell's Excursions through Ireland of 1820.

== Mornington Strand ==
Mornington Strand consists of dunes, known locally since at least the mid-eighteenth century as The Burrows, see below, and a wide sandy strand which extends south from the River Boyne towards Bettystown. The links course of Laytown and Bettystown Golf Club is situated within the Mornington dune-system. There are areas of soft sand close to the River Boyne training walls; warning signs erected at Bettystown warn of the danger. The intertidal sand and mudflats, and the Mornington sand dune systems, are included within the Boyne Coast and Estuary Special Area of Conservation (SAC) which extends along the coast from Bettystown to Termonfeckin. The bodies of murder-victims were found here in 2007 and 2013.

== Myth and early history ==
Inbher Colpa or Inber Colptha was the principal name in early medieval times for the mouth of the Boyne and in particular the area on its southern shore. There hostium Colpdi, the haven of Colpa, was located in a small shallow inlet and natural harbour south of the present bridge at Mornington. The Inbher or tidal estuary of the Boyne, which now extends inland as far as the confluence with the Mattock River, had an earlier tidal limit just below the river-crossing at Ros na Ríg. The estuary had a number of names in medieval Irish literature and was associated as a place of departure and arrival in the ancient legends and myths often signifying stories concerning drownings, a dangerous wave or tidal bore, overseas arrivals and corporeal remains found in the inter-tidal wrack of the estuary. Tráig Inbir or Tráig Indbir Colpa, the Strand of Inbher Colpa, a counterpart to Mornington, was within the wider area of Tuath Inbhir (i mBregaib) between the Boyne and Nanny.

The origin of the name is associated in myth with Colpa an Chlaidhimh ("of the Sword"), a son of Míl Espáine in the Milesian origin of the Irish, an invader who was drowned by a wave in the attempt to land, and by tradition is buried behind Colp church in a ringfort touching on Mornington's boundary. While Colpa drowned, Érimón, his eldest brother, made safe landing in this place and became one of the first Milesian High Kings of Ireland. An alternative Dindsenchas tradition, a body of literature in verse and prose form on the origin of famous places, associates the variant name Inber Colptha with the Máta, a massive aquatic creature which occupied a once submerged plain around Dundalk, Magh Muirthemne, and which was killed and dismembered on a stone, Liacc Benn, on top of Newgrange in Brú na Bóinne, by the Dagda and parts thrown into the Boyne. What can be described variously as its limb, shank, calf of the leg, or shinbone (colptha) reached the estuary giving name to Inber Colptha. The colptha probably called to mind the narrow channel of the Boyne at this point and played on the original word Colpa. Áth Cliath, "the hurdled ford", the Irish name for Dublin, is explained in the same Dindsenchas account referring to a hurdle of bones, the ribcage of the Máta.

Other associations in myth include The Tragedy of the Sons of Tuireann, Togail Bruidne Dá Derga, Lebor Gabála Érenn, the lives of various saints, Acallam na Senórach, other Fenian Cycle tales and the Dindsenchas tradition. The aetiological explanation for the Boyne itself was an out-surging of the Well of Segais on Síd Nechtain, the mythological form of Carbury Hill belonging to Nechtan, which tore apart and drowned his wife the goddess Boann, in a flood of water, and in some versions her lapdog Dabilla, before sweeping out to sea giving the generic name Inber Bóinne or Inber Bóinde to the Boyne estuary. In Acallam na Senórach, c. 1200, the upper estuary near Mainistir Droichit Átha (Mellifont Abbey) is called Inber Bic Loingsigh, The Estuary of Becc the Exile, son of one Airist, King of the Romans. He also is explained as having been drowned by a wave when invading Ireland here. The name may be an untraditional construct echoing and modifying the better known story of Colpa, and overlaying it with a more prestigious figure from the Classical World, as the Acallam also retains reference to Tond Indbir Colpa cruaidh, the hard or harsh Wave of Inbher Colpa, in a poem section listing it as one of the famous waves of Ireland.

The estuary is presented in Togail Bruidne Dá Derga as the principal maritime entry port of Ireland in the peaceful times of the legendary king Conaire Mór: 'Now there were in his reign great bounties, to wit, seven ships in every June in every year arriving at Inver Colptha, and oakmast up to the knees in every autumn, and plenty of fish in the rivers Bush and Boyne in the June of each year, and such abundance of good will that no one slew another in Erin during his reign. And to every one in Erin his fellow's voice seemed as sweet as the strings of lutes. From mid-spring to mid-autumn no wind disturbed a cow's tail. His reign was neither thunderous nor stormy'.

The traditional boundary of the province of Ulster was the Boyne and its tributary the Blackwater, appearing as such in the Táin Bó Cúailnge. The Ulaid according to historian Francis John Byrne 'possibly still ruled directly in Louth as far as the Boyne in the early seventh century' a time when Congal Cáech made a bid for the kingship of Tara. Tuath Inbir and Tráig Indbir Colpa are listed as the southern boundary points of the forest and lands of Conall Cernach, mythological hero of the Ulaid. The two districts ran north to the area of Newry, were given to Conall by Cuscraid Meand Macha, King of Ulster, his foster-son, and represent later pseudo-historical claims by the Cruthin of Conaille Muirtheimne. It is unclear if these claims go south of the Boyne, including these areas rather than touching on them, but the rath of Láeg, charioteer of Cú Chulainn found at Ninch also has Ulster Cycle associations, and both the Máta and Cú Chulainn are connected with Magh Muirthemne of the Cruthin. Another tradition found in the Senchas Már tells that Ulaidh was extended south to the Delvin River as an éraic-fine paid to Fergus mac Léti, King of Ulaidh.

By historical times, in the sixth century, the tribal grouping known as Ciannachta Breg were in place between Annagassan and Dublin centering on Duleek, the stone-church of St. Cianán. Their origin is placed with Tadc mac Céin in the legendary history-cycle tales of Cormac mac Airt who "is stated to have been deprived of the kingship [of Tara] and the eight-century saga of the battle of Crinna tells how with the help of Tadc mac Céin he drove the Ulaid back from the Boyne and was restored to the throne. ... The tale particularly refers to the Ciannachta, named from Tadc's father Cian, who occupied territory on both banks of the lower Boyne. Cormac promised Tadc as much land as his chariot could encircle in a day, but bribed the charioteer to exclude Tara as Tadc lay unconscious from the wounds he sustained". According to the Annals of Ulster the Ciannachta were defeated in 535 by Túathal Máelgarb at Luachair Mór eitir dá inber (... between two estuaries) a place between the Boyne and the Nanny, or Delvin River now the townland of Lougher west of Duleek. The Ciannachta of this area, south of the Boyne and north of the Nanny Water, came under the direct control of the Síl nÁedo Sláine in the seventh century, including the area of Tuath Inbhir i mBregaib. In the ninth century the Boyne estuary was referred to as Inber na mBárc ('Estuary of the Ships') when a Viking fleet of sixty ships operated there plundering the Boyne floodplain. A battle was fought there in 837 by the Southern Uí Néill against the Viking fleet, in the same year Saxolf, 'leader of the foreigners' on the Boyne and Liffey, was killed by the Ciannachta. Over time the territory passed to the control of the Clann Cholmáin Kingdom of Meath with the rest of Brega. They remained under the jurisdiction of the separate bishop in place at Duleek from the fifth century until the see was subsumed by the Diocese of Meath with the arrival of the Normans in the late twelfth century.

== Later history ==
The main surviving historic monuments in the area are a head and base of a sandstone high cross found at Colp, the head now in the Church of Ireland church at Julianstown, the Maiden Tower, built in the sixteenth century (see above), and the ruined tower-house castle at Donacarney Cross. Another castle previously stood in Mornington townland beside Colp as part of the medieval settlement cluster. Nothing now remains of it above ground.

Mornington was separated from Colp in the early Norman period and given the status of a borough. The separate designation was in use by 1182 when Hugh de Lacy, Lord of Meath granted its tithes to support the new foundation of the Augustinian Abbey at Colp, ten years following his enfeoffment by Henry II with the lands of the Kingdom of Meath. This was a cell of his favoured religious house of Llanthony situated on his estates in the Welsh vale of Ewyas. Mornington took its name from Robert le Mariner, a Norman proprietor, who also appears in Latin as Roberto Marinario bearing witness to a charter in Dublin (No. 230) recorded in the Chartularies of St. Mary's Abbey. The placename was well established by the beginning of the 13th century, being known variously as Villa Roberti Marinarii (1211), Villa Marinarii, Vill Marenariorum, and over time Maris, Marynerton, Marinerston by Colp, Marinerstown or Mornanton. Duuenacharny (Donacarney) was recorded as part of Mornington in Walter de Lacy's charter of confirmation 1230–1234 but thereafter was counted as part of the manor of Colpe. Robert le Mariner probably died without heirs before 1234, as in that year Walter de Lacy, Lord of Meath, granted "the whole land which belonged to Christiana wife of Robert le Mariner in the town of Mariners in Ireland near the port of Drogheda to God and the [Cistercian] Abbey of St. Mary of Furness in England and the abbot and monks serving God there". The opening up of Airgíalla to colonisation and the development of Drogheda in the 1180s and 1190s would have sidelined the settlement. Historian B.J. Graham notes that in 1235, "a burgage in the vill Marenariorium, now known as Mornington ... was included in a grant of land to [the Cistercian] Beaubec Abbey [which held a monastic farm at Beymore, east Meath]. At this time the settlement contained a church, a stone tower, a mill and some messuages, an inventory which makes it clear that, despite its borough status, the vill Marenariorum was no more than a manorial village in size or function".

Mention of regulated rabbit warrens appear in 1400 as part of the customs of the manor - "the issues and profits of courts, rabbit warrens, fisheries, tolls [tolbell'], heriots and all other customs of the manors of Marynereston and Donaghkerny". This is associated with the later name in use, The Burrows, mentioned above. In 1812 Edward Wakefield described it as the only "one warren of sufficient extent [in Meath, which] ... extends along the sea-shore, from the mouth of the river Boyne towards the mouth of the Nanny river, and belongs to Mr. Brabazon of Morningtown. The rabbits burrow in a heap of sand blown off the sea-shore by the easterly winds, and feed on a salt marsh running parallel to it, being prevented from going on the uplands and corn-grounds by broad drains, which are kept constantly full of water. They are taken by pass-nets, placed between them and the burrow, on their hasty return from feeding at night, being alarmed by the barking of dogs kept for that purpose. They are all disposed of in Dublin market, the skin being generally more valuable than the flesh ..."

Despite close links and being surrounded on the landward side by the neighbouring and more extensive Manor of Colpe Mornington remained a separate vill having its own church up to the sixteenth century with 'Marynerton' being listed amongst the Irish possessions of Furness Abbey and Llanthony at the Suppression of the Monasteries in 1536. Around this time Henry Draycott (c. 1510–1572) an English-born Crown official and judge in sixteenth-century Ireland, who held a number of senior Government offices, became a substantial landowner in the Pale, with his principal estate at Mornington. He was a political ally of the Lord Deputy, Anthony St. Leger and acquired many former church properties in the Dissolution. His descendants quickly integrated within the Old English community of the Pale and remained one of the significant families in the area for the next 150 years.

By 1603, Mornington was being considered part of the Civil Parish of Colpe. It appears as part of Colpe in the Civil Survey of 1654 and in Samuel Lewis's "Topographical Dictionary of Ireland" (1837) under Colpe, or Colpe-cum-Mornington.

Mornington was the scene of one of the actions in March 1642 during the raising of the Siege of Drogheda of 1641–42 as the garrison undertook raids into the locality to disrupt the Northern rebels under Sir Phelim O'Neill surrounding the town. The castle at Colpe, in Mornington townland, was captured by Lord Moore of Mellifont with part of the relief force from Dublin in this action. The Drogheda forces found the previous year's harvest still in the fields and John D'Alton in his history of Drogheda quotes Dean Nicholas Bernard how:

Early on that morning [the 3rd of March] ... the forces under Colonel Wainman advanced hither, where they found the town [of Mornington] abandoned, so that their whole work that day was to reap what was left, for which all sorts were permitted to go forth for pillage; the lanes so thickened with all sorts of grain, that the spring seemed to be harvest ... Such loads of corn were mounted on horses that upon the hills they looked like moving haggards, by which our great extremity was turned presently into plenty.

The town of Drogheda then with great joy set to brewing the captured grain for beer "having drunk nothing but water for a week". In this raid they also burned:

A fair house of one Draycot (who by the rebels was newly created Viscount Mornington, for his merit in the cause) ... which was done the rather in a just revenge of his fraudulent disarming many of our soldiers as they were making hither from the bridge of Julianstown. His library, with what could be preserved from the fire, was brought in hither and sold us at very easy rates; a very large parchment manuscript of an old missal, consecrated to that church of Mornington, came to my hands, the loss of which I presume they have valued more than their houses.

This missal and another book called the Black Book of Llanthony, both now lost, had previously belonged to the library of Henry Draycott.

The destroyed house is recorded in 1640 as the property of John Draycott of Mornanstowne and Valeran Weisley of Dingen, along with 308 Irish acres. Its ruins located on Church Road, were recorded as a large, irregularly-shaped building described in gothic lettering as a 'Ruin' on the 1836 ed. of the Ordnance Survey 6" map. It was believed locally to have been the site of a former monastery.

The Ozanam Home now sits on the site of 'Mornington House', Coney Hall, latterly the principal residence in the area and owned by the Brabazon family. A plaque dedicated to James Brabazon, Esq., who died in 1794, which shows his links to the Earls of Meath, is found on the ivy-covered wall of the early church in the old graveyard of Mornington. The family's association went back to their seventeenth-century ancestor, a Captain James Brabazon who was wounded at the Battle of Aughrim on the Williamite side. Another significant family in the area were the Weslies, later Earls of Mornington.

== Title of "Earl of Mornington" ==
The title Earl of Mornington has been one of the greatest British aristocratic titles for centuries. Originally a British peerage title it is now a courtesy title. The current holder of the earldom is Arthur Darcy Wellesley (born 2010), the son of Arthur Gerald Wellesley, Marquess of Douro, and his wife Jemma, who is the sister of Jodie Kidd. The connection to Mornington of the Wellesley, Wesley, Weslie, or, Weisle family name goes back to at least the sixteenth century, as Lewis says on the suppression of Colp Abbey a place called 'Weisle's Farm' in Mornington was paying tithes to the Abbey. Gerald Weslie, late of Dangan, "Irish Papist", who died in 1603, is mentioned in an inquisition of 1624 as having been in possession of "the manor of Marinerstown or Mornanton counting two messages and 120A and of a capital fishery commonly called the lord's fishery". Richard Colley (later Richard Wesley, 1st Baron Mornington) inherited Dangan and Mornington in 1728 from his cousin Garret Wesley. His son was the 1st Earl of Mornington, the father of Field-Marshal The 1st Duke of Wellington.

== Use of the name Mornington in other contexts ==
The many Mornington places in Australia and across the world were named in honour of the second Earl, a brother of the Duke of Wellington. This has led to its use for the Mornington Crescent game on I'm Sorry I Haven't a Clue taken from the Camden street Mornington Crescent, London also named for the second Earl.

The name has been given to a number of ships in connection with the Earls of Mornington, such as Mornington (ship) and Earl of Mornington (ship).

The famous jockey Herbert Mornington, or Morny, Cannon was born the same day in 1873 that his father Tom Cannon won the Somersetshire Stakes at Bath on a colt named Mornington and named after that event.

The name has also been used in the title of the play "Of Mornington" by Billy Roche, the play's revered snooker cue being handcrafted at the fictitious 'Beecher's of Mornington'.

Mornington is a surname still in use, although rare. The motto of the Mornington family is Virtutis Fortuna Comes.
