= Tom Wood (rugby union) =

English rugby union player (born 1986)

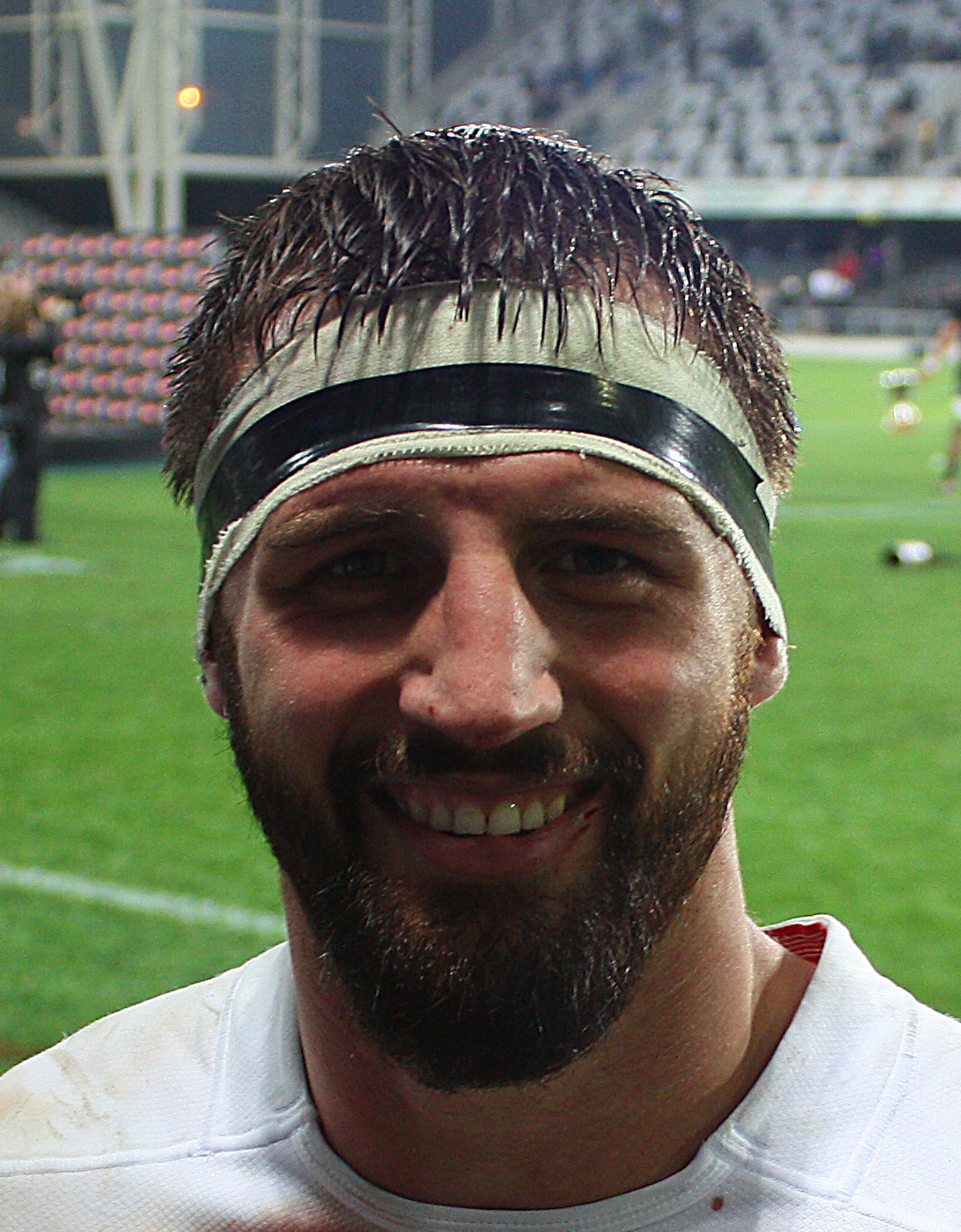
- Born: Thomas Wood; 3 November 1986 (age 40) Coventry, England
- Height: 1.96 m (6 ft 5 in)
- Weight: 112 kg (17 st 9 lb; 247 lb)
- School: The Woodlands, Coventry

Rugby union career
- Position(s): Flanker, Number Eight
Youth career
- -: Barkers Butts RFC
Senior career
Years	Team	Apps	(Points)
2006	North Otago	10	(15)
2007–2010	Worcester Warriors	64	(25)
2010–2022	Northampton Saints	238	(115)
International career
Years	Team	Apps	(Points)
2010–2011	England Saxons	1	(0)
2011–2022	England	53	(0)

Tom Wood (born 3 November 1986) is an English former professional rugby union player who played as a flanker or number eight for Premiership Rugby clubs Worcester Warriors and Northampton Saints and the England national team

== Club career ==
Wood, who was educated at the Woodlands School and Sports College, Coventry, made his debut for Worcester Warriors against Bath in the opening round of the 2007–08 Guinness Premiership. Earlier in his career he spent some time in New Zealand and played for provincial team North Otago.

Wood was on the losing side in the final of the 2007–08 European Challenge Cup. In January 2010, Wood agreed to join the Northampton Saints.

Wood was awarded the 2011 Aviva Premiership Player of the Season award and was shortlisted by the Rugby Players' Association for their Players' Player of the Year award alongside Chris Ashton, Chris Budgen, Nick Evans, Eliota Fuimaono-Sapolu and Thomas Waldrom and for their Young Player of the Year award alongside Owen Farrell, Courtney Lawes, Joe Marler, Charlie Sharples and Manu Tuilagi.

Wood captained Saints to both the European Rugby Challenge Cup and Aviva Premiership trophies as the side completed its double winning season, collecting both titles within eight days of each other.

Named club captain for the 2016/17 season, Wood lead the side through a tough season which ended in Saints fighting to secure a final place in European Rugby Champions Cup for the 2017/18 season, despite beating Harlequins on the final day of the regular season. Despite their win, Saints had to continue their quest for top-tier European rugby and face Connacht Rugby in the European Champions Cup play-off semi-final. Beating Connacht convincingly, Saints turned their attentions to the play-off final and Stade Français Paris. Despite Wood receiving a red card in the proceedings, Saints went on to score a last minute try and secure the win and therefore the final place in the European Champions Cup for the following season.

== International career ==
In January 2010, Wood made his debut for the England Saxons, against Ireland A.

Tom Wood made his debut for England against Wales in Cardiff in the opening game of the Six Nations, on 4 February 2011. He then played in the victories against Italy and France. Wood was named in the 30-man squad for England in the Rugby World Cup later that year, but started only one game against Georgia.

Upon Stuart Lancaster's appointment as interim Head Coach, speculation mounted that Wood might be named captain for the 2012 Six Nations. However, a foot injury saw him miss both the Six Nations and England's tour to South Africa in the summer. Wood returned to the side in the end-of-year internationals, starting fixtures against South Africa and New Zealand. His performance in England's 38–21 victory over New Zealand saw him named Man of the Match.

The 2013 Six Nations saw Wood start at blindside flanker in the opening fixture against Scotland, but move to Number 8 for the remaining four fixtures following an injury to Ben Morgan. Wood was named captain for England's tour of Argentina in the summer, leading the side to a 2–0 series victory whilst playing in his usual position at blindside flanker. Wood was named to start for all three games in the following end-of-year internationals.

The flanker played for England during the 2015 Rugby World Cup as the side dropped out of their home World Cup in the pool stages.

Wood missed out on an England selection in the coming years but was re-called to the squad under Eddie Jones and helped the nation to end their losing streak against the Springboks in 2016 as well as hold onto their Six Nations title the following year while earning his 50th international cap.

== Playing style ==
Wood is capable of playing across all three back row positions, but is typically used at blindside flanker for his country. His abrasive style of play sees him featuring heavily in defence, frequently putting in high tackle counts and helping slow opposition ball at breakdowns. His height and athleticism also sees him used frequently as a lineout jumper.

== Retirement ==
Wood announced his retirement from professional rugby in June 2022.
