= Laytown Racecourse =

Horse racing venue in Laytown, Ireland

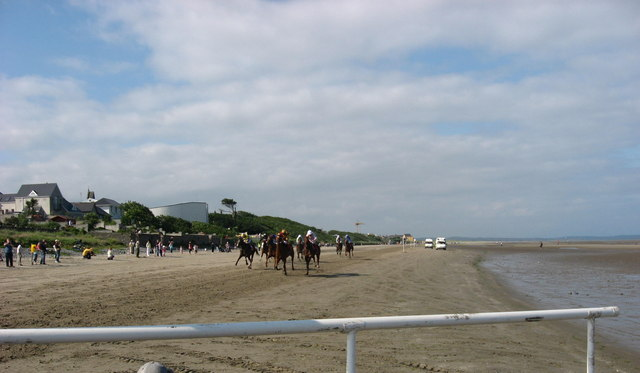
- Laytown Races, 2007
- Location: Laytown, County Meath, Ireland
- Date opened: 1868
- Course type: Flat

Laytown Racecourse is a horse racing venue on the beach at Laytown, County Meath, Ireland. Laytown is unique in the Irish racing calendar as it is the only race event run on a beach under the Rules of Racing. The first recorded race meeting in Laytown was in 1868. The races take place on the strand for one day every September.

The strand course is a straight near-level course over six and seven furlong distances.

The BBC have made it the subject of a documentary, titled Racing the Tide, and have included passages in their Coast and Countryfile programmes. The horses used to run along the beach, make a U-turn and run back. The onlookers used to stand just feet away from them to watch the racing, with no barriers in between. In 1994 an accident occurred when one of the horses became spooked by a small river stream on the course and bolted into the crowd. This caused panic amongst some of the other horses too. One jockey was taken to hospital, several people in the crowd were injured and three horses were put down because of the injuries they sustained. For subsequent meetings several safety measures had been put into practice. Barriers were constructed, the crowd were separated from the runners and now watch from a field next to the beach, the number of runners in each race was limited and the races were limited to much shorter distances with no turning round.

The 2020 meeting, scheduled for 1 September, was cancelled by the races committee in July 2020 due to the COVID-19 pandemic in the Republic of Ireland. The decision was taken because of concerns about implementing social distancing at the course and village.
