= Donacarney =

Town in County Meath, Ireland

Donacarney Domhnach Cairnigh Mór (Irish)
- Town
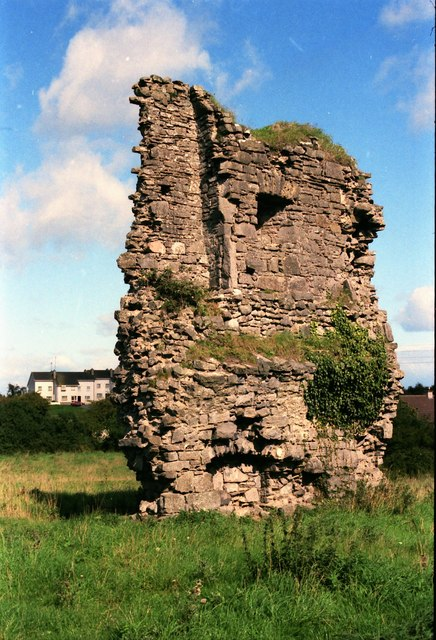
- Castle ruin at Donacarney

- Location in Ireland
- Coordinates: 53°42′34″N 6°16′42″W
- Country: Ireland
- Province: Leinster
- County: County Meath

Area
  - Total: 2.19 km^{2} (0.85 sq mi)

Population (2022)
  - Total: 15,642
- Urban area of Laytown–Bettystown–Mornington–Donacarney

Donacarney (Irish: Domhnach Cearnaigh or Domhnach Cairnigh) is a village in County Meath, Ireland, close to Drogheda and the border with County Louth. It contains one church, two estates, two schools, and one pub. Although it includes the townlands of Donacarney Great and Donacarney Little, most locals would never use those terms in describing Donacarney. The remains of a late-medieval tower house (see picture to right) are sited close to Donacarney Cross. It is described in the Down Survey (1654–56) as "an ould Castle". It appears in this state on a map of 1771. Blackhills Crescent, Donacarney, takes its name from the area known as the Black Hills or Black Hill Lands north of the crossroads and the castle, the old name of which was Croc a' Searra in Irish.

Together with the neighbouring villages of Laytown, Bettystown and Mornington, it comprises the urban area of Laytown–Bettystown–Mornington–Donacarney with a combined population of 15,642 at the 2022 census.

== History ==
Donacarney, or Duuenacharny, was recorded as part of Mornington in a 'Charter of Walter de Lacy reciting and confirming a grant made by Hugh his father of various churches & lands in Ireland’ in 1230–1234. Thereafter it became part of the manor of Colpe throughout the medieval period. It was in the possession of the Augustinian Abbey at Colp, (a cell of Llanthony Priory in Monmouthshire) but held and run separate from the manor by a tenant. At the Suppression of the Monasteries in 1536 in became part of the estates of Henry Draycott. The ruins of the late-medieval tower house were known as ‘Draycott’s Castle’ and is thought to have been burnt in 1641.

Little Donacarney was connected to the eighteenth-century case of Annesley v Earl of Anglesea [sic.] (1743). This case was taken to trial to test the claim of James Annesley to the title and estates of Earl of Anglesey as the legitimate son and heir of Arthur, lord Altham against the claims of his uncle Richard Annesley, 6th Earl of Anglesey. The trial was commenced in November 1743 by a plea of trespass and ejectment taken against the Richard, Earl of Anglesey for 1,500 acres of the lands of Great and Little Stameen, Little Donacarney, Shallon &c. in the County of Meath, by Campbell Craig for those lands leased to him in May 1742 to him by James Annesley, Esq. and which Craig occupied and was subsequently ejected from in May 1742. This allowed the question of ownership of the estates of the Earl of Anglesey to be raised in the Irish courts. James laid claim to his birthright with the help of the Scottish adventurer and barrister Daniel Mackercher. It has been claimed that the novel Kidnapped by Robert Louis Stevenson was inspired by the true story of James Annesley's sale into servitude in America and return to claim his inheritance.

In 1799 a local respectable farmer named Laurence Murray was robbed by banditti who surrounded the house and broke open the door. They declared "We are not robbers, but patriots; and it is but just that the opulent should contribute to support us, who thus venture ours lives for the good of the country". They left with cash, a sugar tongs and a Great Coat, before their captain returned what teaspoons they had taken.

== Schools ==
Donacarney has two schools: a boys' school and a girls' school. Roughly 600 pupils attend both schools. The schools share the same campus. The names of the schools are Réalt ná Mara BNS and Réalt ná Mara GNS respectively. The old school hall, which was replaced by the current schools in 1965, was originally opened in 1873. The red-bricked building, beside the forge and old village water pump at Donacarney Cross, now serves as a community centre. It is also used as the local polling centre in elections. The school was given planning permission for a new school in 2012 and the sod was turned.. It was officially opened on December 5, 2014, by Bishop Michael Smith of Meath.

== Religion ==
There is one Roman Catholic church close to Donacarney in the adjoining townland of Mornington. It is called Star of the Sea Church. It is also called Mornington Church, and serves the half-parish of Mornington, part of the Laytown-Mornington parish created in 1986, which includes Donacarney.
