= Coláiste na hInse =

Secondary school in County Meath, Ireland

Coláiste na hlnse

Location
- Bettystown, County Meath; Ireland; 53.6926614°N 6.2447056°W

Information
- Type: Secondary school
- Motto: Aimsigh do Réalt Eolais or Dearfachas, Bród, Uaillmhian
- Religious affiliation: Multi-denominational
- Established: 2008
- President: Eilis Flood
- Staff: 200+
- Gender: Mixed
- Enrolment: 1007
- Website: www.colaistenahinse.ie

Coláiste na hInse, (Note: hInse, with the second letter capitalised, is grammatically correct. However, other stylisations such as hinse, Hinse, and HInse are sometimes used.) colloquially referred to by locals as the Coláiste or CNI, is a co-educational secondary school in Bettystown, County Meath, Ireland. Whilst English is the school's primary language of instruction, it places an emphasis on the use of Irish on a day-to-day basis.

== History ==
The Coláiste began in 2008 with 79 students, 8 teachers, and Anne Marie McCarrick as its principal at the former site of the closed Neptune Hotel, with a plans for a purpose-built permanent school building underway. In the meantime, the school made use of a temporary second building in the neighbouring village of Laytown.

The plans were approved in 2010 by Mary Coughlan, signed off with Elliot Sammon Construction for a new site at the location of the former Scoil Oilibhéir Naofa. The school's purpose-built 25-classroom building with a gymnasium had its grand opening in 2012, by which point the student body had grown to over 600 students.

An Cuan, the coláiste's autism unit, was established in 2013 to meet needs of autistic students.

To keep up with the local demand for places at the school, an extension that would increase the school's capacity from 1,000 students to 1,300 students was approved in early 2020. The demand also pushed Meath Council to develop a permanent facility for Drogheda ET Secondary School in Mornington.

At the start of the 2020–2021 school year, McCarrick stepped down as principal, having been in the founding position since 2008. She was succeeded by Ms Eilis Flood in September 2020.

== Notable alumni ==
- Clinton Liberty (b. 1998) - actor
- Conor Maguire, rugby union player
- Matthew Nolan (b. 1999) - musician
- Evan Ferguson (b. 2004) - international footballer
