= Laytown =

Village in County Meath, Ireland

Laytown An Inse (Irish)
- Village
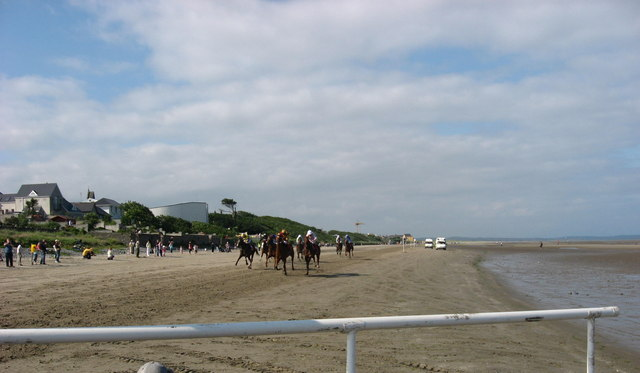
- Laytown Races

- Location in Ireland
- Coordinates: 53°41′02″N 6°14′36″W
- Country: Ireland
- Province: Leinster
- County: County Meath
- Irish Grid Reference: O162714

Historical population
Year	Pop.	±%
1831	587	—
1841	317	−46.0%
1851	333	+5.0%
1861	68	−79.6%
1901	112	+64.7%
1936	258	+130.4%
1946	401	+55.4%
1951	411	+2.5%
1956	1,117	+171.8%
1961	1,034	−7.4%
1966	1,339	+29.5%
1971	1,882	+40.6%
1981	2,997	+59.2%
1986	3,321	+10.8%
1991	3,360	+1.2%
1996	3,678	+9.5%
2002	5,597	+52.2%
2006	8,978	+60.4%

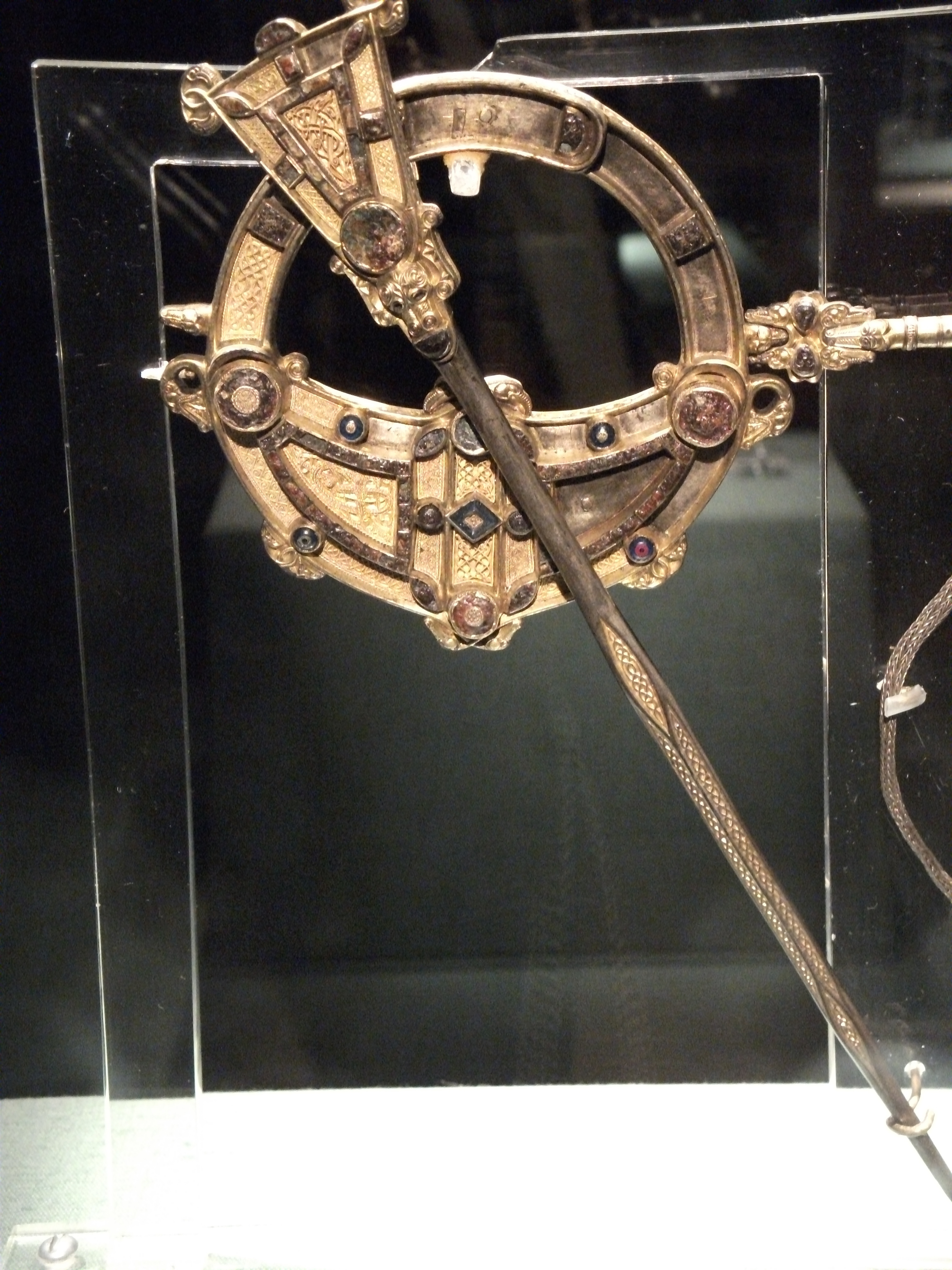
The Tara Brooch, now at the National Museum

Laytown (Irish: An Inse, meaning 'the holm') is a village in County Meath, Ireland, overlooking the Irish Sea. Historically it was called Ninch, after the townland it occupies. Together with the neighbouring villages of Mornington, Bettystown and Donacarney, it comprises the census town of Laytown–Bettystown–Mornington–Donacarney, which recorded a population of 15,642 in the 2022 census.

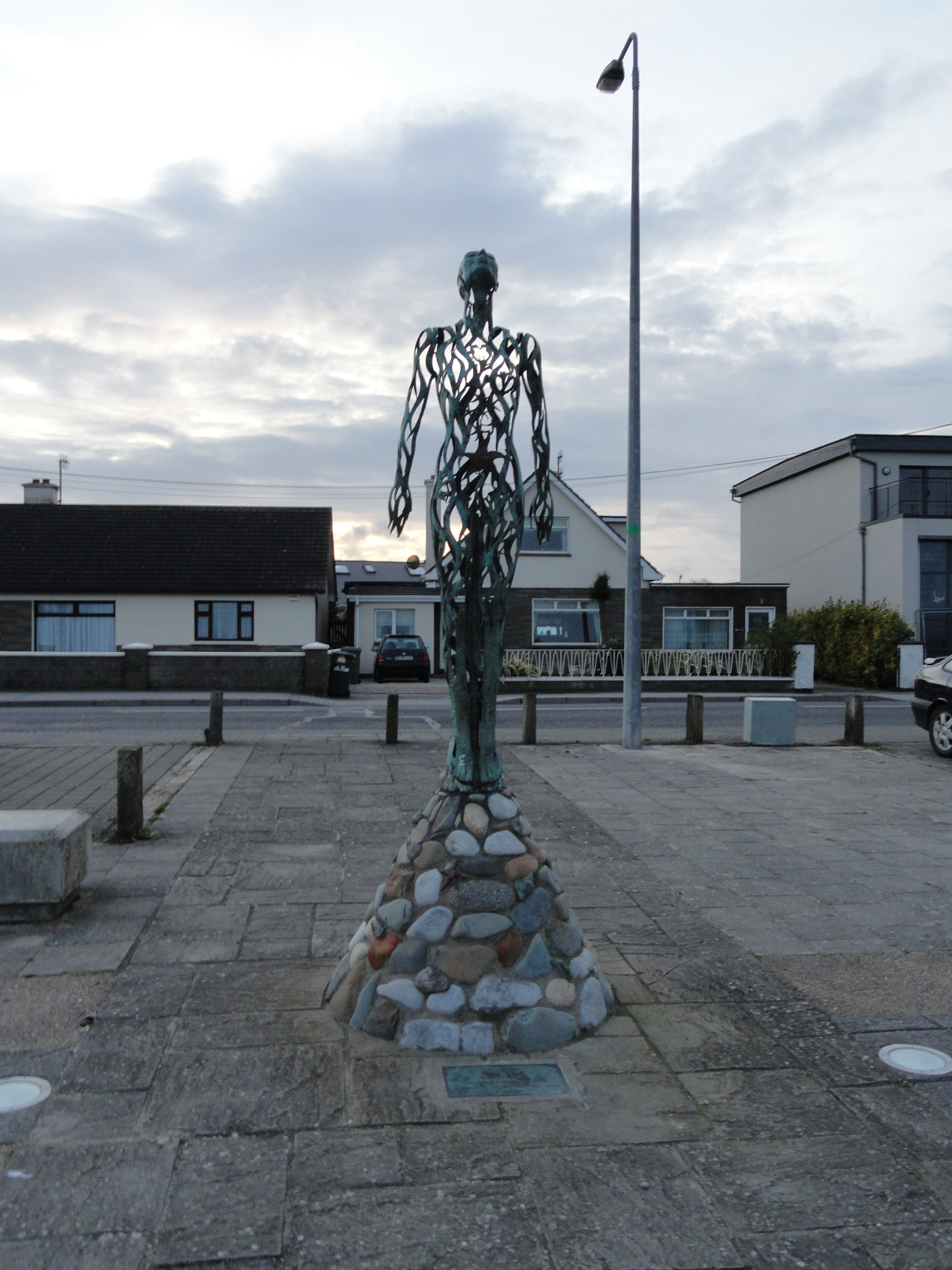
Beachfront sculpture Voyager

== History ==
The surrounding area is known to have been settled for around 1500 years; recent excavations have revealed settlement at Laytown since at least the 6th century AD.

=== Archaeological finds ===
One of the most notable historical finds in Irish history was made on Bettystown beach in 1850. A local woman claimed (rather implausibly) to have found the Tara Brooch in a box buried in the sand. Many think it was in fact found inland and the claim was made to avoid a legal claim by the landowner of the actual find site, wherever that was. The Tara Brooch is now on display in the National Museum of Ireland in Dublin.

More recent archaeological finds include, for example, a blue glass bead of the Early Christian Period which was found in 1976 at the rath at Ninch West. The rath is traditionally associated with Laeg mac Riangabra, Cuchulain's charioteer, from whom Laytown is said to take its name. The glass bead is now also in the collection of the National Museum of Ireland.

Also in the late 1970s, an earthen mound known locally as "The Mote" and overlooking the River Nanny at The Ninch, was partially excavated by P. D. Sweetman for the National Monuments Section of the Office of Public Works. Two Iron Age interments were found.

A dig, in 2000, revealed early Christian graves of around 50 people and a Bronze Age enclosure. Artefacts recovered include a Hiberno-Norse ring pin.

=== 19th and 20th century developments ===
Many of Laytown's larger buildings, including the train station master's house and the large terrace homes facing onto the beach, were built in the mid-nineteenth century. The architecture of the Church of the Sacred Heart is of particular note, with its facade retained from the original nineteenth century, but the main building being to a 1970s circular-plan. It is a single room with a large window overlooking the Irish Sea. On the hill behind the window is a twenty-foot wooden cross.

=== Subsequent growth ===
Laytown was once a small coastal village, but in the early 21st century, the town has seen a large population and economic boom. With the ever-developing and growing city of Dublin, Laytown, along with other villages and towns all along the east coast, has seen population growth. This has brought problems with overcrowded schools.

== Geography ==
Laytown is 38 kilometres (24 mi) north of Dublin. Laytown and the neighbouring village of Bettystown sit on one of Ireland's most scenic beachfronts. The beach stretches from Mornington at the River Boyne, which borders County Louth to Gormanston at the River Delvin, which borders County Dublin.

Laytown sits on the mouth of the River Nanny, a tidal estuary where mullet, trout, eels, gobies and flounder can be caught — but no salmon: according to local folklore, Saint Patrick banished all the salmon from the river. By an old schoolhouse overlooking the river there is a spring known as St Patrick's Well, though the access path to it is overgrown.

== Education ==
There are two primary schools in Laytown/Bettystown which follow a Catholic ethos. They are Scoil Oilibhear Naofa Junior School and Scoil an Spioraid Naomh Senior School. Scoil Oilibhear Naofa is a recently built state-of-the-art school and the Department of Education has plans for a complete redevelopment of Scoil an Spioraid Naomh..

There are also two multi-denominational schools outside the town that service East Meath and South Drogheda. They are Le Cheile Educate Together National School and Gaelscoil an Bhradain Feasa. These schools teach an ethical programme and a basic type of comparative religion. If parents want the children to have faith formation in any particular religion, they have to arrange that in after school classes.

A new secondary school Coláiste na hInse was founded in 2008 and services the East Meath area.

== Transport and communications ==
Laytown is a commuter town for people working in Dublin, who are served by the rail line into Dublin Connolly station, and the M1 motorway linking the north east of the country to the capital. It is on the R150 road, and access to the M1 is via the R132 road. The village is served by the Northern commuter train line linking Drogheda and Dundalk to Connolly station in Dublin. Laytown railway station opened on 25 May 1844 and was renamed as Laytown & Bettystown in 1913. An express coach service links Laytown, Bettystown and Sonairte with Parnell Street in Dublin. Bus Éireann has changed from route 190 to the D1 which provides several daily services to/from Drogheda via Bettystown and Mornington.

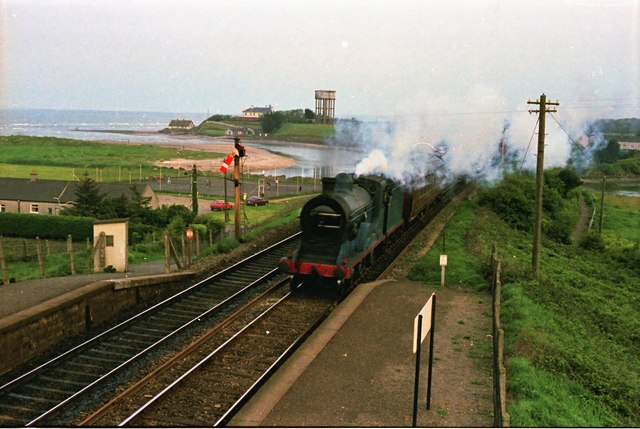
A Great Northern Railway (Ireland) locomotive Slieve Gullion in May 1985 going through Laytown railway station on a special run by the Railway Preservation Society of Ireland.

The East Meath area also has a free monthly magazine known as the Meath Coaster. This magazine, solely supplied in East Meath, showcases images of the coast's scenery, local schools' and clubs' achievements as well as an update from the Meath County Council.

== Amenities ==
The town has a garda station and a primary school called Scoil an Spioraid Naoimh. Coláiste na hInse is a co-educational secondary school in Laytown which was founded in 2008 and had an enrollment of over 1,000 pupils as of 2018. The village also has three pubs, two newsagents, a pharmacy, two take-aways, a coffee shop, and a railway station.

Sonairte, the National Ecology Centre, is half a mile from the station on the Julianstown road (R150).

== Laytown on film ==
Both Irish and American movies (The Crying Game and Michael Collins) and television shows have been filmed all over Laytown, mostly on the beach. The Crying Game was filmed locally in the village of Laytown in 1991 using the carpark as a fair-ground and the former long wooden pedestrian bridge over the River Nanny as a location.

== Laytown races ==
Since 1868 Laytown has hosted a single annual horse racing meeting on its beach. The BBC have made it the subject of a documentary, titled Racing the Tide, and have included passages in their Coast and Countryfile programmes. The horses used to run along the beach, make a U-turn and run back. The onlookers used to stand just feet away from them to watch the racing, with no barriers in between. In 1994 a terrible accident occurred when one of the horses became spooked by a small river stream on the course and bolted into the crowd. This caused panic amongst some of the other horses too. One jockey was taken to hospital, several people in the crowd were injured, and, tragically, three horses were put down because of the injuries they sustained. The races were abandoned for a few years and when they did restart, several safety measures had been put into practice. Barriers were constructed, the crowd were separated from the runners and now watch from a field next to the beach, the number of runners in each race was limited and the races were limited to much shorter distances with no turning round.

== Governance ==
It is part of the local electoral area and municipal district of Laytown–Bettystown on Meath County Council, and part of the Dáil constituency of Louth (Dáil constituency).

== See also ==
- List of towns and villages in Ireland
