= Henry Draycott =

English-born Crown official and judge

Henry Draycott (c. 1510–1572) was an English-born Crown official and judge in sixteenth-century Ireland, who held a number of senior Government offices, including Chancellor of the Exchequer of Ireland. Despite his apparent lack of legal qualifications, he also had a successful career as a judge, becoming a Baron of the Court of Exchequer (Ireland) and Master of the Rolls in Ireland. He became a substantial landowner in the Pale, with his principal estate at Mornington, County Meath.

His daughter Alice died in mysterious circumstances after a banquet in Dublin Castle in 1576, as did the Earl of Essex, the Lord Lieutenant of Ireland; they were both allegedly victims of poisoning (they drank from the same cup at the banquet), although it is more likely that they both died a natural death.

== Background ==
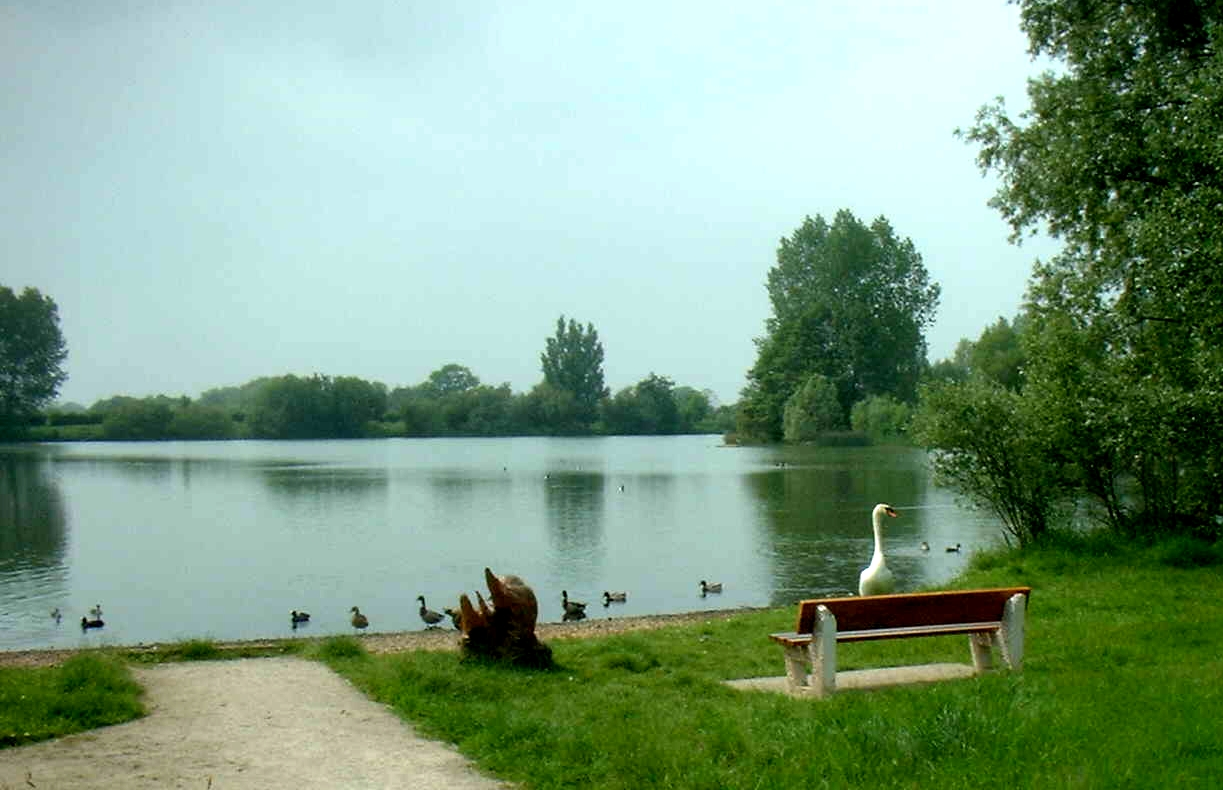
St. Chads Water, on the outskirts of Draycott, Derbyshire

Draycott was a native of Denby in Derbyshire; his family name probably derives from the nearby village of Draycott. Little is known of his parents or of his early life. Despite his later eminence as a judge, it is not clear when he was called to the Bar, or indeed if he was a qualified barrister at all. He is recorded in Ireland from 1544; his first official post was as Treasurer of the Lordship of Wexford, and he received a lease of Crown lands in Wexford.

== Administrator ==
Draycott quickly became a person of considerable influence in the Irish administration and was appointed Chief Remembrancer, a senior position in the Court of Exchequer: his task was to prepare the files for the judges to read. He was elected to the Irish House of Commons as one of the two members for Naas in the Irish Parliament of 1560. He was entrusted with a number of political missions to England, and was later a reliable supporter of the Lord Deputy of Ireland, Sir Henry Sidney. He was given the task of settling a controversy between the Earl of Ormond and the Earl of Desmond, and was involved in the settlement of Munster in 1567.

Draycott was granted substantial properties in Counties Meath and Louth. His main estate was at Mornington in Meath; he also owned the manor of Donnycarney, near Drogheda, and other property in Dundalk. Like most English settlers in Ireland, he was indifferent to the rights of the original landowners, and was willing to assist other members of the settler class in "finding" (a euphemism for forging) title to land. In particular, the historian John Hooker, when he was acting as secretary to Sir Peter Carew, refers to the assistance Draycott gave to Carew in acquiring his substantial Irish estates.

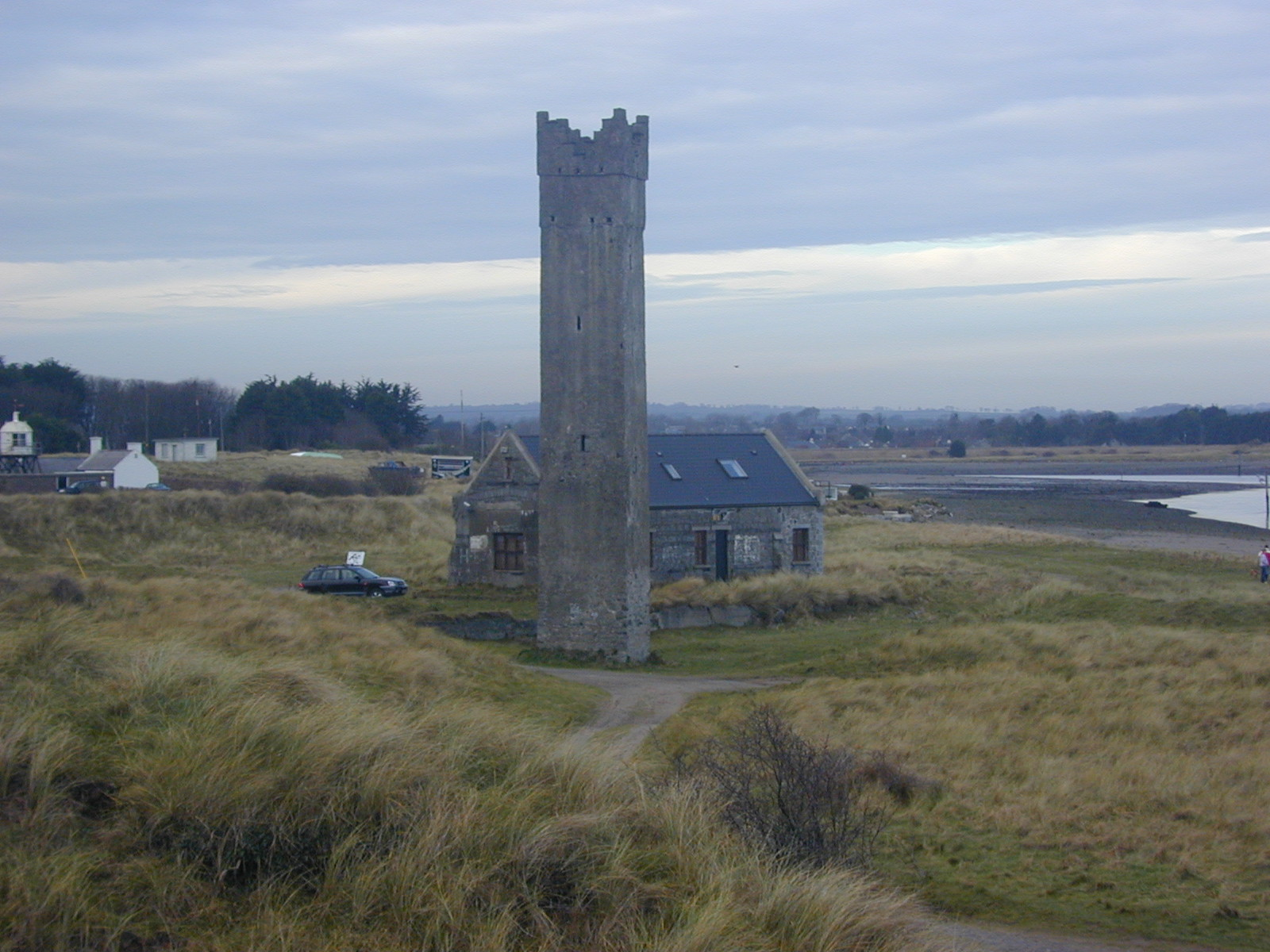
Mornington, where Draycott had his principal estate

== Judicial career ==
Draycott was appointed a Baron of the Court of Exchequer (Ireland) in 1563 and Master of the Rolls in 1566. Although he gained a reputation for integrity, Elrington Ball queries his suitability for either office, since it is not clear if he had any legal qualifications. However the Mastership of the Rolls was then more an administrative than a judicial office and Draycott was undoubtedly an efficient administrator; one of his principal tasks was to peruse, sort and classify the official records. The Barons of the Exchequer had originally been tax collectors rather than judges, and while they were now professional lawyers, the revenue gathering part of their work remained crucial until the 1660s at least. Another objection to his appointment to high office was his chronic ill-health: in 1567 his friend Sir Henry Sidney, the Lord Deputy of Ireland, described him as "a very sick and a weak man". Surprisingly, when his successor as Baron, Richard Edwarde, retired in 1570, Draycott, despite his increasing infirmity, resumed his old seat on the Exchequer. He was chosen as one of the lessees of the King's Inn in the same year. He died in 1572.

== Character ==
Despite his apparent lack of legal qualifications, Draycott has been praised as a judge who was noted for integrity, and as a man whose service to the Crown deserved commendation. Less admirable was his greed for acquiring land, often by unscrupulous means, and his willingness to help other settlers like the rapacious Sir Peter Carew to acquire lands by similar underhanded transactions. Unlike most English settlers at this time, he may have had Roman Catholic sympathies: though like all public officials after 1560, he was by necessity a Protestant in his outward observance, his family within a few years of his death became and remained open Roman Catholics.

Queen Elizabeth I had a personal regard for Draycott, and on his death wrote that she was sorry to have lost one whom she esteemed as a good and faithful servant, but trusted that he had exchanged this world for a better one.

== Descendants ==
Draycott was married and had at least three children: John, Alice and a second daughter whose first name is uncertain, who married Christopher Plunkett, a younger son of the Baron of Dunsany. His widow, Mary, remarried Owen Moore, the Muster Master for Ireland: in 1577 Owen was granted wardship of his stepson John and the right to arrange his marriage. John was knighted as Sir John Draycott. He married Anne Barnewall, daughter of Sir Christopher Barnewall and Marion Sherle, and had six children.

== Death of Henry's daughter, Alice Draycott ==
Henry's daughter Alice died in mysterious circumstances after falling ill at a banquet in Dublin Castle in September 1576. Rumour had it that she was poisoned by assassins acting on the orders of the Earl of Leicester, who had supposedly been aiming for Leicester's enemy, the Lord Deputy of Ireland, Walter Devereux, 1st Earl of Essex, who had drunk from the same cup as Alice, and also died soon afterwards. The autopsy on Essex found no evidence of poisoning, and it is most likely that both Essex and Alice died of dysentery. Several other guests at the banquet were also reported to have become seriously ill, but none of them claimed to have been poisoned. Leicester's enemies habitually blamed him for the sudden death of anyone he had quarrelled with, but there appears to be no substance to any of these claims.

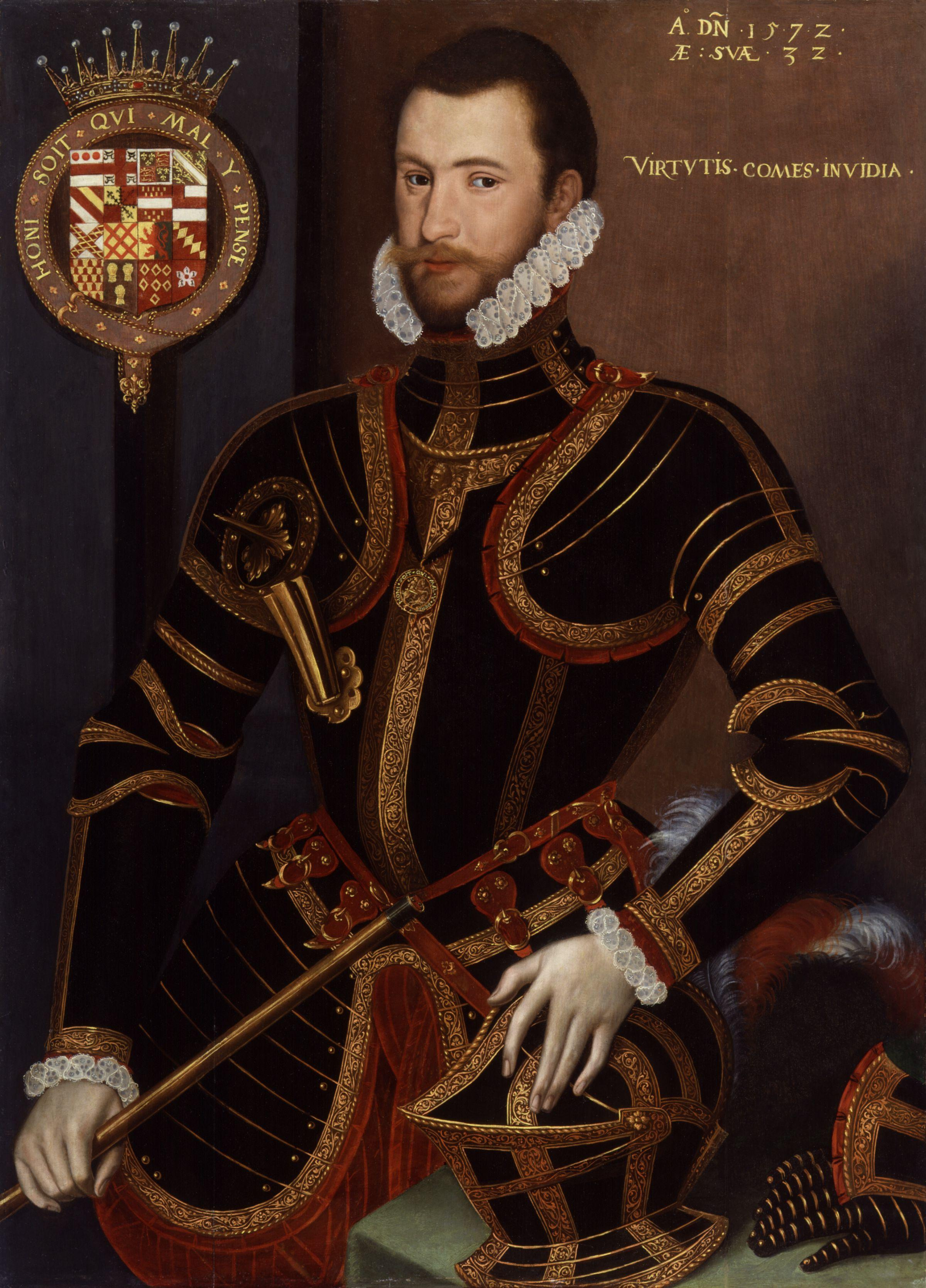
Walter Devereux, 1st Earl of Essex: he and Draycott's daughter Alice were rumoured to have been poisoned by the Earl of Leicester

=== Later generations ===
Draycott's last direct male descendant, Henry Draycott of Mornington, died in 1694 without lawful issue: this led to a notable lawsuit, Draycott v. Talbot in which one Edward Draycott claimed, unsuccessfully, to be the younger Henry's lawful son and heir. The Court laid down a point of general importance: the entry of two names as husband and wife in a parish register is not in itself proof that they were married: their identity must be proved independently, and evidence such as cohabitation must be brought forward as proof of the marriage itself.
