= Laytown–Bettystown–Mornington–Donacarney =

Built-up area in County Meath, Ireland

Coordinates: 53°41′55″N 6°14′41″W

Historical population
Year	Pop.	±%
2002	5,597	—
2006	8,978	+60.4%
2011	10,889	+21.3%
2016	11,872	+9.0%
2022	15,642	+31.8%

Laytown–Bettystown–Mornington–Donacarney (Irish: An Inse–Baile an Bhiataigh–Baile Uí Mhornáin–Domhnach Cairnigh) is a built up area in County Meath, Ireland, comprising the adjoining villages of Laytown, Bettystown, Mornington and Donacarney. Prior to 2016, it was listed as Laytown–Bettystown–Mornington.

In the east of County Meath, its coastline stretches from the River Boyne (bordering County Louth) to the Delvin River (bordering County Dublin). This stretch of beach is 11 km (7 mi) long and constitutes the whole coastline of County Meath.

It is one of the fastest-growing areas of the country, with a population increase of 31.8% from 2016 to 2022.

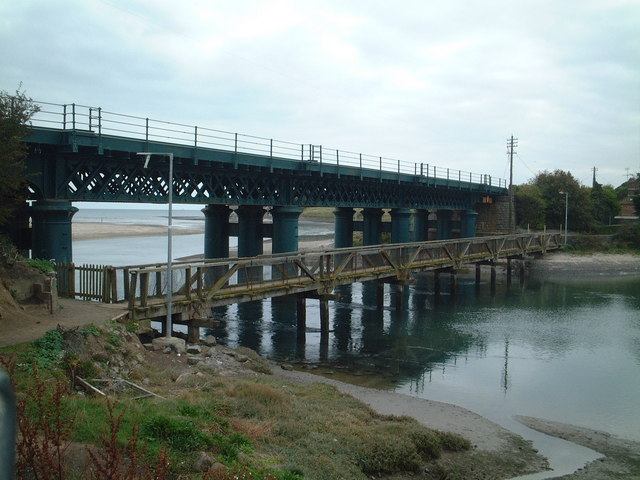
Bridges across the River Nanny at Laytown

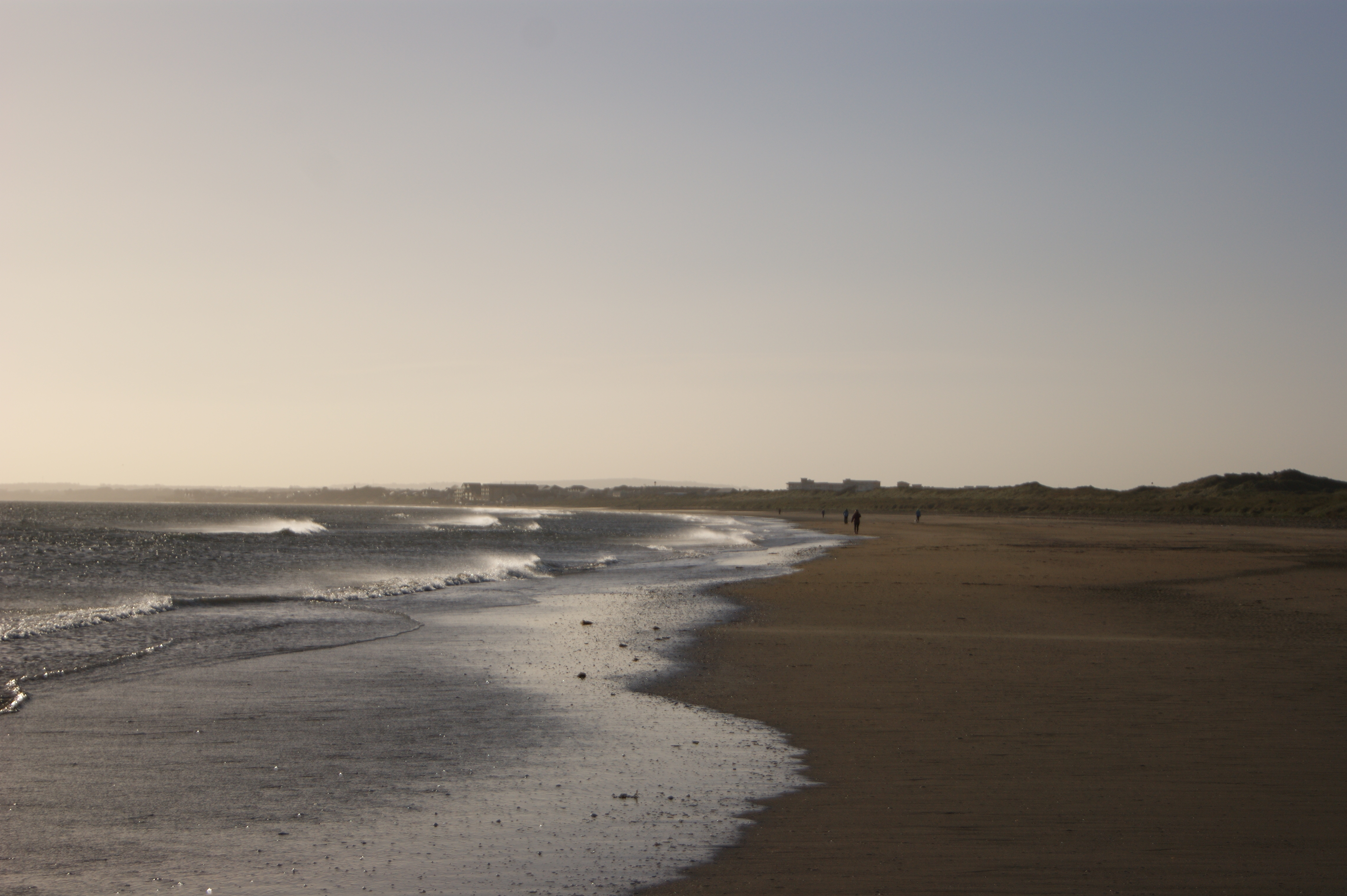
Beach at Bettystown

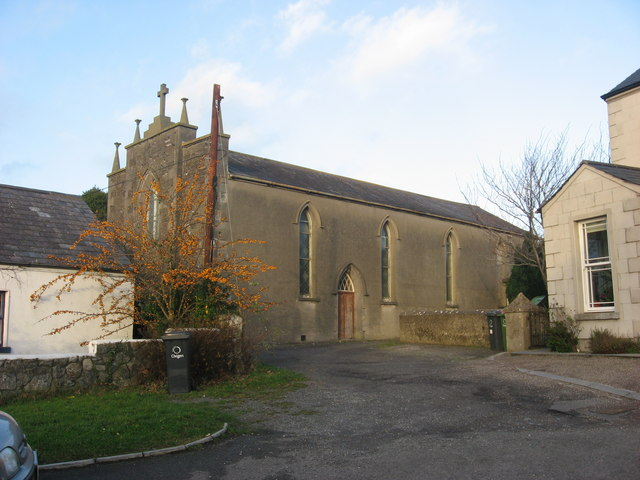
Church at Mornington

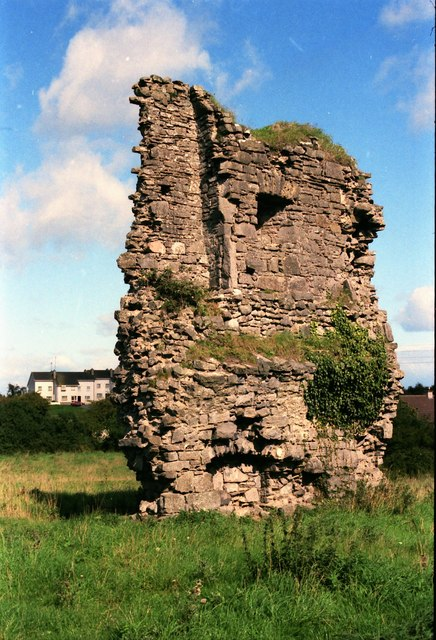
Castle ruin at Donacarney
