= Connor Maguire =

Connor Maguire may refer to:

- Connor Maguire, 2nd Baron of Enniskillen, Irish nobleman
- Connor Roe Maguire (died 1625), Irish Gaelic chief of Magherastephana, County Fermanagh

== See also ==
- Conor Maguire (judge), Irish politician, lawyer and judge
- Conor Maguire (rugby union), Irish rugby union player
