= Conor Maguire (rugby union) =

Irish rugby union player

- Born: Skerries, County Dublin, Ireland
- Height: 1.80 m (5 ft 11 in)
- Weight: 113 kg (17.8 st; 249 lb)

Rugby union career
- Position: Loosehead Prop
Senior career
Years	Team	Apps	(Points)
2020–2021	Dragons	7	(0)
2021	Gloucester	1	(0)
2021–	Hartpury University	1	(0)
- Correct as of 28 July 2021

Conor Maguire is an Irish rugby union player, who played for English Premiership side Gloucester. He plays as a prop.

== Early life ==
Maguire was born in Skerries, County Dublin and moved to East Meath at the age of seven. He attended Coláiste na hInse in Bettystown.

== Amateur career ==
Prior to making his professional debut, Maguire played for a number of teams including Boyne, Old Wesley, Leinster A and Connacht Eagles, as well as age-grade rugby for Leinster and Ireland.

== Professional career ==
Maguire made his senior professional rugby debut for Welsh side Dragons against Benetton in round 13 of the 2019-20 Pro14 on 6 March 2020, after joining on a short-term deal. The short-term deal at the Dragons was extended following rugby's restart after the COVID-19 pandemic.

On 12 February 2021, Maguire would sign for English Premiership side Gloucester as part of their elite academy squad for professional development.

On 5 August 2021, Maguire has signed a professional contract with Hartpury University to compete in the RFU Championship from the 2021–22 season.
