= West Coventry Academy =

Secondary school in Tile Hill, Coventry

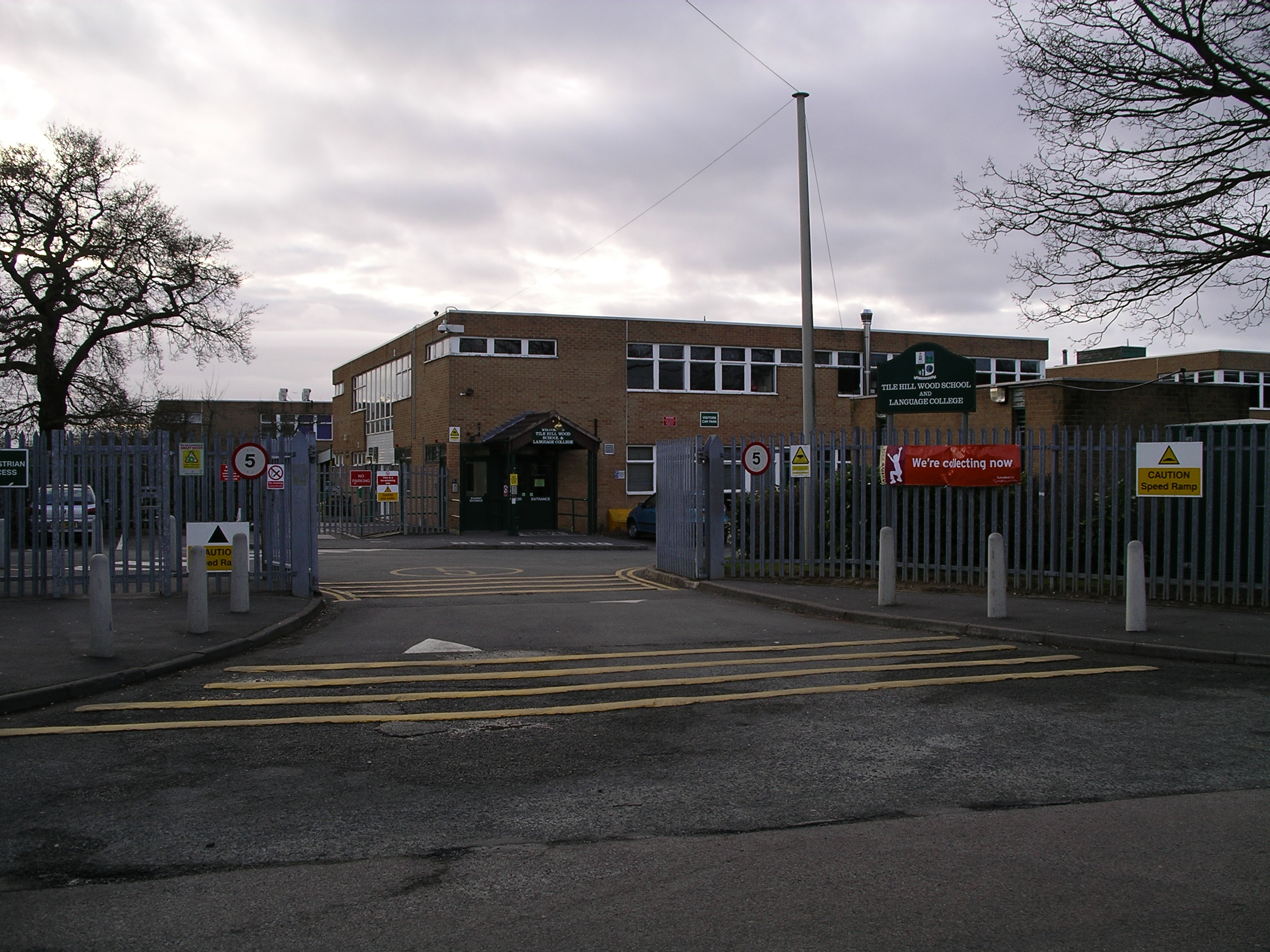

Location
- Tile Hill Lane; Coventry, West Midlands, CV4 9PW; England; 52.4040°N 1.5897°W

Information
- Type: Academy
- Established: 1957
- Local authority: Coventry City Council
- Department for Education URN: 137209 Tables
- Ofsted: Reports
- Gender: Co-educational
- Age: 11 to 18
- Enrolment: 1136 as of September 2020
- Website: https://westcoventry.atlp.org.uk/

West Coventry Academy is a co-educational comprehensive secondary school and sixth form located in the Tile Hill area of Coventry, West Midlands, England. It was formed from the merger of Woodlands Boys School and Tile Hill Wood Girls School.

== History ==
The Woodlands School for Boys opened in September 1954, and was one of the first comprehensive schools to be built in Britain.

Tile Hill Wood School for Girls opened in September 1957, costing just over £250,000. Only those girls who had passed the Eleven-plus examination were eligible to attend.

According to the booklet written for the 25th anniversary of the school in 1982, only 40 girls initially started. They met outside the Middle School building and were allocated, with staff, to one of three classes in either class 2A, 2B or 2C.

From the Admission Register the first intake of girls was on 10 September. One hundred and five girls were admitted that day, forty seven of that number were transferred from Templars Secondary Modern School as they had also passed the 11 plus examination. The girls were accommodated into two blocks which each could hold up to 120 people. The first head Mistress was Miss Charlotte Stanley. The uniform consisted of forest green blazer with a badge on the breast pocket which the colours of blue, green, silver and gold represented the woods and the plough. The motto was “With Gods help one could plough a straight furrow in life.” A forest green skirt and underwear, white blouse, terracotta socks and forest green beret completed the uniform.

The prefects helped with the organisation of the school as they were table leaders at lunch times as the girls ate a fixed cooked meal in family groups of ages 11 to 18 years in the back of the house rooms. No one was allowed to leave the premises at lunchtime unless they were in the sixth year and absolutely no pupil could enter the school through the front gate, access was, and still is, from Nutbrook Avenue.

School assemblies were very formal affairs as staff wore their gowns as they walked onto the platform. From the 1970s however, with the increase in numbers, assemblies are now a weekly meeting of the separate years.

By 1970, the four houses had split to become nine houses and each house was named after a member of staff. Seven of those names were Stanley, Nuttall, Lisiker, Taylor, Stone, McGowan, Carson, Lupson and Baker. By the time the head mistress, Miss Stanley, had retired the building programme was complete.

Miss Sparshott, became the new headmistress. The school was changed from a vertical house system to a horizontal year system. By the time Miss Sparshott retired in July 1981 there were more than 1550 girls on the roll and eighty-three members of staff. There were nine separate buildings, two kitchens with the four storey building towering above.

In 1998 the school was awarded Specialist Status as a Language College. A new logo was introduced and the motto became “Enjoy, Achieve, Aspire”. An updated uniform followed in 2010 with a return to traditional blazers.

The school went on to become one of the leading Language Colleges in the UK, winning the European Language Award in 2006 for its language immersion programme (CLIL): All students in Year 7 were taught one of their subjects through a foreign language. The school also undertook several projects with Warwick University on behalf of the Department of Education which helped to maintain its national profile as a centre of excellence for language teaching and learning.

In September 2001, the sixth form facilities and Woodlands and Tile Hill Wood were merged to form West Coventry Sixth Form, although pupils aged 11–16 continued to be educated separately.

In 2016 the Governing bodies of Tile Hill Wood School and Woodlands Academy led a consultation on the possible merger of both schools. Reasons cited for the merger included a decrease in pupil numbers in the local area, and fewer parents and pupils choosing single-sex education. Despite some opposition, the merger was approved, and all Woodlands Academy pupils transferred to the Tile Hill Wood site in September 2016. The newly merged co-educational school was renamed West Coventry Academy from September 2017.

== Academics ==
West Coventry Academy offers GCSEs, BTECs and Cambridge Nationals as programmes of study for pupils, while students in the sixth form have the option to study from a range of A-Levels and further BTECs.

The school also offers The Duke of Edinburgh's Award programme.
