= Earl of Mornington (ship) =

Some four ships have borne the name Earl of Mornington (or Earl Mornington), named for one or another Earl of Mornington, and two of these ships made voyages for the British East India Company (EIC):

- Earl of Mornington (1766 ship) - launched in India in 1766; she made three trips under charter to the EIC between 1799 and 1805.
- Earl of Mornington, of 375 tons (bm), was built by G. Foreman and Co., launched in 1798, and later renamed Tay. In 1802 the French captured her and sold her to Arab merchants.
- Earl Mornington, Cook, master, was a ship that the French frigate Forte captured in early 1799.
- Earl of Mornington (1799 ship) - launched in 1799 as a packet boat. She made one voyage for the EIC before the Royal Navy purchased her in 1804 and named her HMS Drake; she was broken up in 1808.

== See also ==
- Mornington (ship)
