= Woodlands Academy, Coventry =

Woodlands Academy
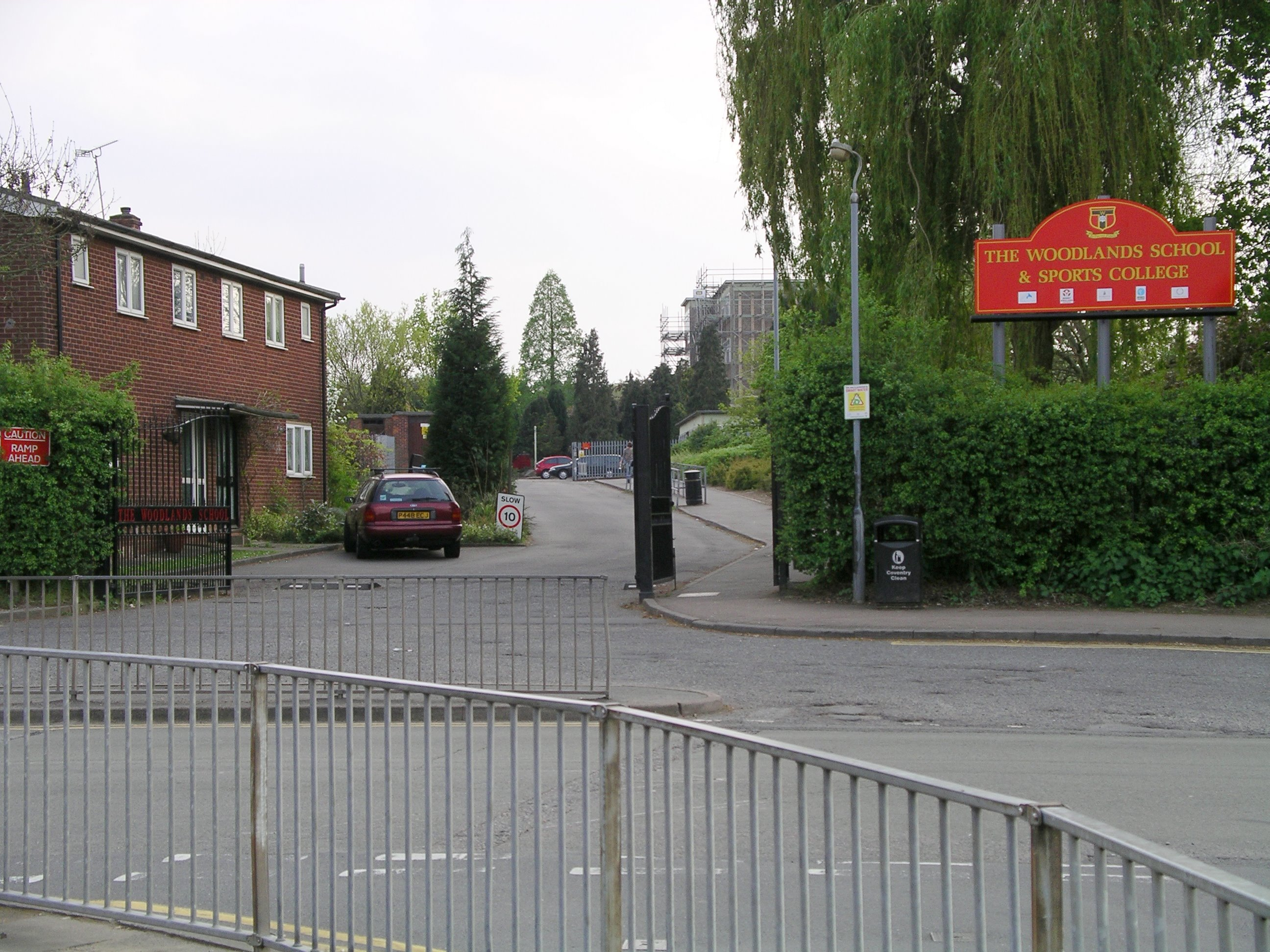

Location
- Broad Lane; Coventry, West Midlands, CV5 7FF; England; 52.41279°N 1.59125°W

Information
- Type: Comprehensive; Academy
- Established: 1954
- Closed: 2016
- Local authority: Coventry City Council
- Department for Education URN: 137165 Tables
- Ofsted: Reports
- Gender: Boys
- Age: 11 to 18
- Enrolment: 799 as of March 2016
- Houses: 5

Woodlands Academy (formerly The Woodlands School and Sports College) was a boys comprehensive secondary school situated in west Coventry in the West Midlands, England.

== History ==
The school was purpose-built in 1954 as one of the first comprehensive schools in the country, by the collaboration of two local educational establishments, Coventry Technical Secondary School a Grammar School and Templars School a Secondary Modern School It opened on the morning of 21 September 1954. Historic links to these two can be seen in The Woodlands School coat of arms. Pupils were aged between 11 and 18. It remained a boys school; girls went to the nearby Tile Hill Wood School.

In 2003, the school was awarded specialist status as a Sports College.

In the main building there was a copy of the Guernica painting, which illustrated a stylised view of the 1937 Bombing of Guernica in Basque Spain by German and Italian bombers in the Spanish Civil War, in which the artist Pablo Picasso clearly expressed his abhorrence to the military suppression of the Spanish people.

There was a flagpole behind the library bearing a dedication to students of the original schools who were killed in the wartime bombing of Coventry.

In 2003, Woodlands School adopted a new system where all the pupils took their SATs and GCSEs a year early compared to most other secondary schools in England. The percentage of pupils gaining five grade A*-C GCSEs rose from 36% in 2007 to 61.7% in 2008. This led to them being ranked the fifth most successful comprehensive in the city.

In August 2011, Woodlands School converted to academy status and was renamed Woodlands Academy.

In 2016, the Governing bodies of Woodlands Academy and Tile Hill Wood School led a consultation on the possible merger of both schools. Reasons cited for the merger included a decrease in pupil numbers in West Coventry, and fewer parents and pupils choosing single-sex education. Despite some opposition, the merger was approved, and all Woodlands Academy pupils transferred to the Tile Hill Wood site in September 2016. The newly merged co-educational school was renamed West Coventry Academy from September 2017.

=== Houses ===
The school made use of the house system and every pupil was registered into one of them. They had assemblies and ate lunch in the house rooms, along with all of the other year groups in the house. Initially a total of eight houses were established, with another two following in 1956. They were named after famous citizens of Coventry. Before it closed, the school had five houses. Out of the original ten houses, five of the houses were closed in the 1980s, and Thompson and West were additions named after two former head teachers of the school. In 2015, original house McLachlan was closed.

Original eleven houses

- Brooke
- Cresswell
- Ellis (Formerly Spencer House)
- Gibson (est 1956)
- Malins
- McLachlan
- Perrens (Formerly Wilson House)
- Smith-Clarke (est 1956)
- Sparkes
- Stringer
- West

Later five houses

- Cresswell
- Ellis
- Sparkes
- Stringer
- Thompson

School crest

=== Sixth form ===
The schools shared its sixth form facilities with Tile Hill Wood Girls School and The Westwood Academy, forming West Coventry Sixth Form, which was founded in September 2001 after the sixth forms of the two schools were merged. The original sixth form building was in the new drama studio but was later in the building where the house, cresswell was.

== Notable former pupils ==
- Neil Back (born 1969), rugby union player who played for the English national team regularly between 1994 and 2003.
- Cortez Belle (born 1983), former footballer who played in the Football League for Chester City.
- Tony Clarke (1941-2010), one of music’s pioneering producers of the late 1960s and throughout the 1970s, known as ‘the sixth Moody Blue’, whose work included "Nights in White Satin".
- Cyrus Christie (born 1992), professional footballer.
- John Gray, English cricketer, and rugby union, and rugby league footballer of the 1960s, '70s and '80s, playing for Warwickshire (cricket), and Marylebone Cricket Club, England 7s (RU), Coventry R.F.C., Great Britain (RL), England, Wigan, North Sydney Bears, and Manly-Warringah Sea Eagles
- Danny Grewcock (born 1972), rugby union player who like Neil Back played for the English national team around the same time.
- David Moorcroft (born 1953), athlete.
- Tom O'Carroll (born 1945), paedophilia advocate
- Tom Wood (born 1986), rugby union player, currently playing for Northampton Saints and the English national team.
- Errington Kelly (born 1958) Professional Footballer, Coventry City FC, Bristol Rovers, Peterborough United
- Tom Bates (footballer) (born 1985) Professional Footballer, Coventry City FC, Rochdale FC.

== Headteachers ==
- September 1954 – July 1962: Mr F. West
- September 1962 – December 1980: Mr Donald Thompson
- January 1981 – May 1996: Mr Walter Hogarth
- June 1996 – December 1996: Mr Donald Wright (interim)
- January 1997 – July 1999: Mr Graham Legg
- September 1999 – December 1999: Mr Andrew Kerley (interim)
- January 2000 – 2004: Mr David Hebden
- September 2004 – January 2015 : Mr Neil Charlton
- January 2015 – September 2016 : Dr Roger Harris
- September 2016 – July 2017: Mrs Gina O'Connor
