= Mornington (ship) =

Several vessels have been named Mornington named for one or another Earl of Mornington, particularly Richard Wellesley, 1st Marquess Wellesley, 2nd Earl of Mornington (General Wellington).

- Mornington (1799 ship), a British merchant vessel launched at Calcutta. She made three voyages under charter to the EIC. On the third French privateers twice captured her and Royal Navy vessels twice recaptured her. A fire destroyed her in 1815.
- HCS Mornington (1799), a sloop of 22 guns and 438 tons (bm), was launched by the Bombay Dockyard as an armed cruiser for the Bombay Marine. She was later sold at auction.

See also

- Earl of Mornington (ship)
