= Bettystown =

Village in County Meath, Ireland

Bettystown Baile an Bhiataigh (Irish)
- Village
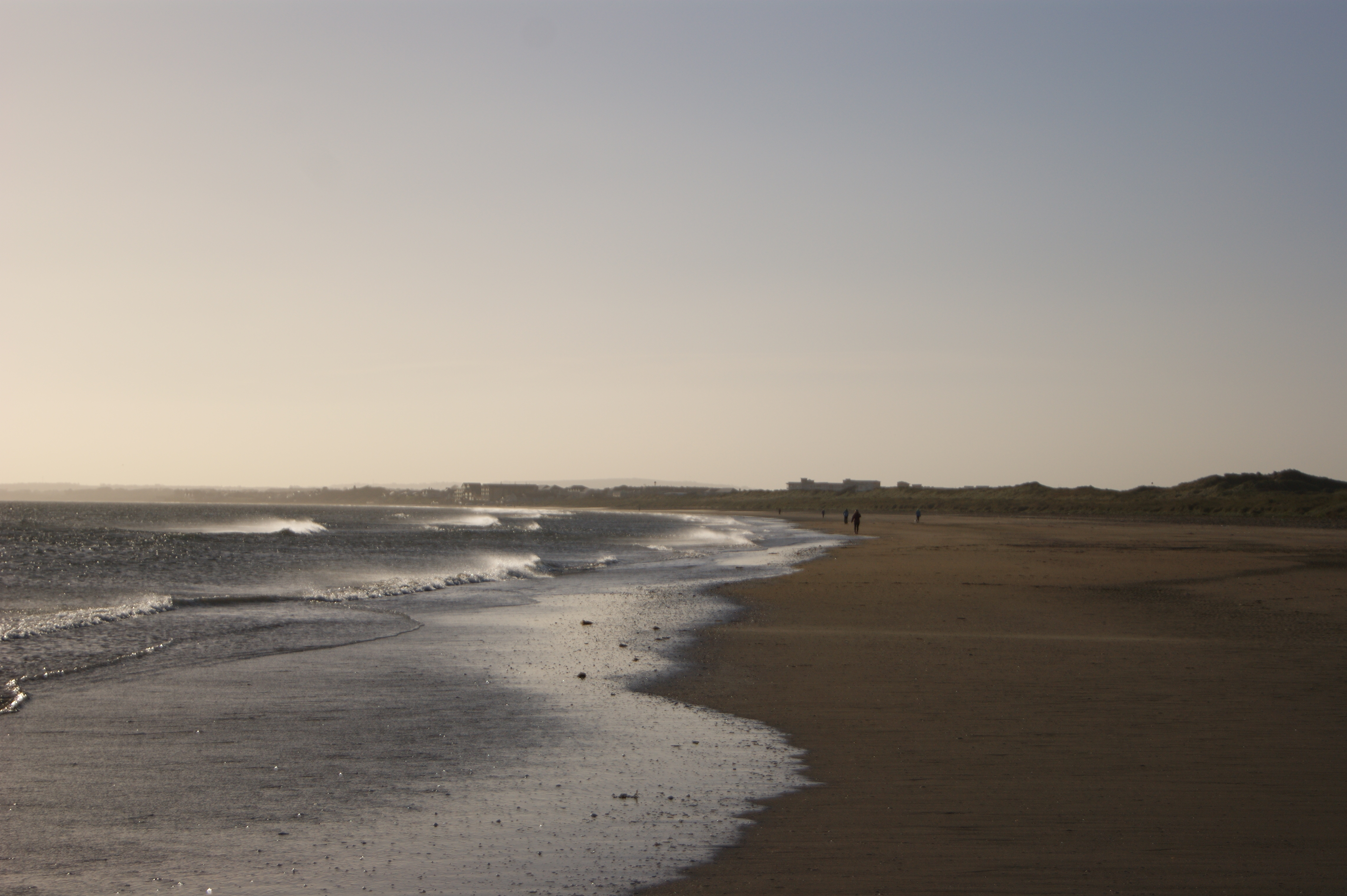
- Beach at Bettystown

- Location in Ireland
- Coordinates: 53.7014°N 6.2461°W
- Country: Ireland
- Province: Leinster
- County: County Meath

Population (2022)
  - Total: 15,642
- Urban area of Laytown–Bettystown–Mornington–Donacarney
- Irish Grid Reference: O156734

Bettystown (Irish: Baile an Bhiataigh), previously known as Betaghstown and transliterated to Beattystown/Bettystown, is a village in County Meath, Ireland. Together with the neighbouring villages of Laytown, Mornington and Donacarney, it comprises the urban area of Laytown–Bettystown–Mornington–Donacarney with a combined population of 15,642 at the 2022 census. During the Celtic Tiger, with increasing property prices in Dublin, Bettystown expanded to cater for large numbers of commuters to Dublin. The area was well known before that as a spot for Dublin summer holiday visitors, with a number of caravan parks and seaside amusements.

In 2011, Bettystown and Laytown as far as the River Nanny were transferred from the three-seat constituency of Meath East to the five-seat constituency of Louth.

== Transport ==
The Dublin and Drogheda Railway line opened on 25 May 1844 with a station at Bettystown. However, this station was to close soon after in November 1847 and since then the village has been served by Laytown railway station also opened on the Dublin and Drogheda Railway line on 25 May 1844 (renamed as Laytown & Bettystown in 1913). Bus Éireann route D1 provides service between Laytown and Drogheda via Bettystown.

== Education ==
There are two primary schools in Laytown/Bettystown which follow a Catholic ethos. They are Scoil Oilibhéir Naofa (opened in 2005) and Scoil an Spioraid Naomh Senior School.

There are also two multi-denominational schools outside the town that service East Meath and South Drogheda. They are Le Cheile Educate Together National School and Gaelscoil an Bhradain Feasa. Le Cheile Educate Together National School is sited on grounds provided by another South Drogheda school, Drogheda Grammar.

A secondary school, Coláiste na hInse, was established in 2008.

== Recreation ==
Leisure facilities in the Bettystown area include Funtasia, an amusement park, a tennis club and a golf course. Funtasia is an indoor family fun center, with bowling, pool and 'fairground' rides.

Laytown & Bettystown Golf Club celebrated 100 years in 2009. Several club members have been capped for Ireland.

Ireland held the European Land Sailing championships in September 2017 on Bettystown beach. Over 100 European sailors competed over this 5 day period of competitions.

Bettystown beach has been host to the annual National Sandcastle and Sand Sculpturing competition in Ireland since 2003.

== Archaeology ==
In 1850 the Tara Brooch was found on the beach at Bettystown. The Tara Brooch is now on display in the National Museum of Ireland in Dublin.

== See also ==
- List of towns and villages in Ireland
