= List of national monuments in County Kilkenny =

The Irish state has officially approved the following list of national monuments in County Kilkenny. In the Republic of Ireland, a structure or site may be deemed to be a "national monument", and therefore worthy of state protection, if it is of national importance. If the land adjoining the monument is essential to protect it, this land may also be protected.

== National Monuments ==
NM#	Monument name	Description	Image	Townland	Location
334	Aghaviller	Church & Round Tower		Aghaviller	52°27′55″N 7°16′05″W
599	Ballyboodan Ogham Stone	Ogham Stone (AD 700-900)		Ballyboodan	52°28′12″N 7°13′22″W
282	Ballylarkin Church	Church		Ballylarkin Upper	52°43′22″N 7°25′39″W
475	Callan Augustinian Friary	Friary (Augustinians)		Callan North	52°32′45″N 7°23′14″W
455	Callan Church (St. Mary's)	Church		Callan South	52°32′39″N 7°23′25″W
79	Kilkieran High Crosses	High Crosses		Castletown (Iverk barony)	52°23′52″N 7°22′51″W
274	Clara Castle	Castle		Clara Upper	52°40′10″N 7°09′08″W
77	Clonamery Church	Church		Clonamery	52°28′01″N 7°01′54″W
646	Coolhill Castle	Donjon		Coolhill	52°27′54″N 6°55′56″W
321	Burnchurch Castle	Castle & Tower		Farmley	52°34′34″N 7°17′51″W
522	Magdalan Castle	Castle		Gardens; Kilkenny City	52°39′10″N 7°14′41″W
331, 344	St. John's Abbey, Kilkenny	Priory (Augustinian) (part of & chancel)		Gardens; Kilkenny City	52°39′13″N 7°14′54″W
626	Kells Castle	Motte & Bailey		Garrynamann Lower; Kells, County Kilkenny	52°32′18″N 7°16′01″W
214	St. Mary's Collegiate Church Gowran	Collegiate Church		Gowran	52°37′45″N 7°03′48″W
620	Graiguenamanagh Abbey	Abbey (Cistercians)		Graiguenamanagh	52°32′27″N 6°57′16″W
74	Grangefertagh	Round Tower & Church		Grangefertagh	52°46′42″N 7°32′41″W
80	Jerpoint Abbey	Abbey (Cistercian)		Jerpointabbey	52°30′39″N 7°09′28″W
300	Kilfane Church	Church		Kilfane Demesne	52°33′15″N 7°07′06″W
75	Killamery High Cross	High Cross		Killamery	52°28′31″N 7°26′45″W
324	Kilmogue Portal Tomb	Portal Tomb		Kilmogue, Harristown	52°24′11″N 7°15′45″W
76	Kilree	Church, Round Tower & Cross		Kilree	52°31′05″N 7°16′07″W
655	Knockroe Passage Tomb	Passage Tomb		Knockroe (Kells, Killamery)	52°25′54″N 7°23′59″W
399	Dunmore Cave	Cave		Ballyfoyle	52°44′02″N 7°14′48″W
180	Kells Priory	Priory (Augustinian)		Rathduff (Madden)	52°32′19″N 7°16′01″W
376	Rathealy Ringfort	Ringfort		Rathealy	52°41′41″N 7°25′57″W
73	Sheepstown Church	Church		Sheepstown	52°29′06″N 7°14′36″W
72	St. Francis Abbey (Kilkenny)	Friary (Franciscan)		St. Mary's Parish	52°39′21″N 7°15′12″W
191	Thomastown Church	Church		Thomastown	52°31′33″N 7°08′22″W
161	Tullaherin	Round Tower		Tullaherin	52°34′45″N 7°07′50″W
670	Tullaroan Church	Church		Tullaroan	52°39′29″N 7°26′01″W
78	Ullard Church	Church		Ullard	52°34′49″N 6°55′59″W
372	Callan Motte	Motte		Westcourt Demesne	52°32′48″N 7°23′29″W
	St. Lachtain's Church, Freshford	Church		Freshford Lots	52°43′58″N 7°23′52″W
	Shee Alms House	Almshouse		Gardens	52°39′05″N 7°15′06″W
	Kyteler's Inn	Public house		Gardens	52°39′11″N 7°15′12″W
	Archer Mansion	early modern townhouse		Gardens	52°39′05″N 7°15′11″W
	Rothe House	early modern townhouse		Gardens	52°39′15″N 7°15′18″W

== See also ==
- List of National Monuments of Ireland
