= List of monastic houses in County Kilkenny =

The smaller establishments such as monastic cells and notable monastic granges (particularly those with resident monks) and camerae of the military orders of monks (Knights Templars and Knights Hospitallers) are included. The numerous monastic hospitals per se are not included here unless at some time the foundation had, or was purported to have, the status or function of an abbey, priory, or preceptory/commandery.

== Layout ==
Communities/provenance: shows the status and communities existing at each establishment, together with such dates as have been established as well as the fate of the establishment after dissolution, and the current status of the site.

Formal name or dedication: shows the formal name of the establishment or the person in whose name the church is dedicated, where known.

Alternative names: some of the establishments have had alternative names over the course of time. In order to assist in text-searching such alternatives in name or spelling have been provided.

== Abbreviations and key ==
The sites listed are ruins or fragmentary remains unless indicated thus:
*	current monastic function
+	current non-monastic ecclesiastic function
^	current non-ecclesiastic function
=	remains incorporated into later structure
#	no identifiable trace of the monastic foundation remains
~	exact site of monastic foundation unknown
ø	possibly no such monastic foundation at location
¤	no such monastic foundation
≈	identification ambiguous or confused

Locations with names in italics indicate probable duplication (misidentification with another location) or non-existent foundations (either erroneous reference or proposed foundation never implemented).

Trusteeship denoted as follows:
NIEA	Scheduled Monument (NI)
NM	National Monument (ROI)
C.I.	Church of Ireland
R.C.	Roman Catholic Church

Foundation	Image	Communities & provenance	Formal name or dedication & alternative names	References & location
Achardensis Friary ^{ø~}		supposed Augustinian Friars, possibly in the barony of Ossory location unknown	Achiardensis; Archer?	
Aghaviller Monastery		early monastic site, patronised by St Brendan of Birr	Achad-biroir	52°27′56″N 7°16′05″W
Anothmolt Abbey		Cistercian monks — from Stanley, Wiltshire (community founded at Loughmerans c.1202); transferred here c.1204; dissolved c.1207, transferred to new site at Graiguenamanagh	Annamult; Achermolt; Athermolt	
Ballylarkin Abbey ^{ø}		asserted monastic site, order unknown founded 13th century?; 'abbey'; (Note: Ordnance Survey) ruins of a parish church; (NM)		
Calime in Leinster ^{~≈?}		Augustinian Friars, probably a duplication of Callan	possibly Callan	
Callan Priory		Augustinian Canons Regular founded c.1215	'Callan Abbey'	
Callan Augustinian Friary		Augustinian Friars founded 1461 (1468-9) by James (buried here), son of Edmund Butler (son of Sir Richard Butler) who, with his wife, petitioned the Pope who instructed the Abbot of Ferns to instigate the foundation; Observant Augustinian Canons Regular refounded 1472; ruinous by 1540; dissolved 1540, surrendered by Prior William O'Fogarty; held by the executors of the estate of the late Earl of Ormond 1548; granted to Thomas, Earl of Ormond 1557-8 with friars in occupancy periodically	Calainn; Calime	52°32′45″N 7°23′14″W
Callan Friary		Augustinian Friars founded 1766		
Clonamery Monastery		early monastic site	St Bronndan	52°28′31″N 7°02′18″W
Clonfert Kerpan Abbey^{~}		early monastic site, founded 503		
Clonmore Monastery		early monastic site, granted to St Mochoemoc (Pulcherius)	Cluain-or, in Ossory	52°18′20″N 7°17′20″W
Columbkille Monastery		early monastic site, founded 6th century by St Colmcille	Kilgriffin	52°32′30″N 7°07′56″W
Duiske Abbey ^{+}, Graiguenamanagh		Cistercian monks — from Stanley, Wiltshire (community founded at Loughmerans c.1202) transferred here from Annamult c.1207, built by William the elder, Earl of Pembroke; dissolved 1536; part of church is in R.C. ecclesiastical use; (NM)	Graiguenamanach; Graignambreathach; Douske; Duiske; Donyske; Vallis S. Salvatoris	52°32′28″N 6°57′17″W
Drumdelig Friary		Dominican Friars (Note: Tomas de Burgo, Hibernica Dominicana, 1762 edition, p.206, no.iv, repeated by Mervyn Archdall, Monasticon Hibernicum, 1786, p.373) novices house, or Franciscan Friars (Note: W. Carrigan, History and Antiquities of the Diocese of Ossory, 1905 iii. p.195) (the latter had land near Dromdelygen 1541)	Thornback; Druim-Deilgneach; Dhrime-Dhilignach	52°41′18″N 7°17′14″W
Ennisnag Monastery^{# C.I.}		early monastic site, founded c. 6th century, by Manchan; Prebend Church, founded 1291 by papal authority suppressed c. 16th century; ruins new Protestant church, St. Peters, founded 19th century.	Saint Manchan, Saint Máedóc -------------- Inis-Snaig; Inisnag	52°33′12″N 7°14′08″W
Fertagh Priory		early monastic site, founded 5th century by St Ciaran of Seirkieran (St Keiran); Augustinian Canons Regular founded before 1251 by the English family of Blanchfield; destroyed and ruinous 1421; rebuilt 1455 by Thady Megirid, a canon of Inchmacnerin; dissolved 1540; priory church in parochial use by 6 January 1541; occupied by Nicholas Cowlye; held by Sir Edward Butler 1566; reverted to James Butler, Jr 1566-7;-1780; now part of a handball alley	St Keirman ____________________; Fertae-cairech; Fertnegeragh; Fertakeyra; Frattakyreach; Grangefertagh	52°46′43″N 7°32′39″W
Fiddown Monastery		early monastic site, founded before late 6th century; coarbs at least until 1073; church demolished 1870	Fedh-duin; Fiodh-duin; Fid-duin	52°19′33″N 7°18′10″W
Freshford Monastery ^{+}		early monastic site, founded 655-7 by St Lachtain mac Torben, Abbot of Achaid-Ut; probably continuing after 1111; site currently occupied by 17th-century St Lachtain's parochial church incorporating 12th century doorway	Achad-ur; Aghoure	52°43′58″N 7°23′52″W
Gowran Camera		Knights Templar founded before 1253; dissolved 1308, church passed to the Hospitallers	Gabran; Gawran	52°37′56″N 7°03′34″W
St. Mary's Collegiate Church Gowran		Collegiate Church; Founded before 1225, Contains a Christianised Ogham Stone from 3rd/4thc. Also the oldest inscribed effigy in Ireland of Ralph, portrieve of Gowran in 1218. The effigy is dated 19 March 1253. The church also contains tombs and effigies of the Butlers of Ormonde. Experts believe that St. Mary's Church was built on the site of an earlier monastery. dissolved 1308, church passed to the Hospitallers	Gabhrán; Gowran	52°37′56″N 7°03′34″W
Inistioge Abbey ^{=+}		early monastic site, possibly founded 6th century, purportedly by St Colmcille; Augustinian Canons Regular founded c.1206 by Thomas Fitz Anthony; dissolved 1540; church in parochial use by 8 January 1541; occupied by Richard Butler; granted to Sir Edmond Butler 1566; incorporated into current C.I. parish church	St Mary and St Colmcille ____________________; St Columba; Inis-teoc; Inis-tiock; Ynysteoc	52°29′21″N 7°03′56″W
Jerpoint Abbey		probably Benedictine monks founded 1158 (1166–70); Cistercian monks — from Baltinglass founded 1180, grant of church confirmed by charter of John, Lord of Ireland, Earl of Morton c.1185; dissolved 1540; church in parochial use by 7 January 1541; granted to Thomas, Earl of Ormond and Ossory 1558; (NM). Thomastown R.C. church contains the high altar from the abbey	Baleochellam; de Geriponte	52°30′39″N 7°09′29″W
Jerpoint Nunnery		Cistercian(?) nuns foundation unknown adjacent to the monks' abbey; dissolved 1228, removal ordered by Stephen of Lexington		52°30′37″N 7°09′26″W (approx)
Kells Priory		early monastic site, founded by St Ciaran of Seirkieran; secular college founded 1183 by Geoffrey fitz Robert, confirmed by Felix Ua Duib Sláin, Bishop of Ossory; Augustinian Canons Regular — from Bodmin, Cornwall founded 1193 by Geoffrey fitz Robert; burnt by William de Bermingham 1252; dissolved 1540, surrendered by Nicholas Tobin 18 March, or Philip Howleghan, 8 March; occupied by James, Earl of Ormond; church in parochial use by 31 January 1541; part leased to Sir Henry Ratcliff 1576; (NM)	St Mary ____________________; Kells in Ossory; Cananus; Keananas	52°32′20″N 7°16′00″W
Kilcolumb Monastery		early monastic site, founded 6th century by St Colmcille; probably continuing after 1161	Cell-colum	52°19′39″N 7°02′02″W
Kilfane Monastery		early monastic site, purported 'abbey' founded by St Phian	Cell-phaain	
Kilferagh Monastery		early monastic site, purportedly founded by St Fiachrius; church in the monastery of Rathen	Kil-fiachra; Kil-feara	52°37′08″N 7°10′46″W
Kilkenny Augustinian Friary		Augustinian Friars "former canons' monastery" (Note: Louis Augustin Alemand, Monasticum Hibernicum, translated and edited by J. Stevens, 1722, pp.309,312,317)		
Kilkenny Black Abbey^{+}		Dominican Friars founded 1225 by William Marshal the younger, Earl of Pembroke (purportedly buried here, but actually at Temple Church, London); dissolved 1540; granted to the Sovereign and commonality of Kilkenny 1543; friars apparently remained in the vicinity reoccupied during the right of Queen Mary; used as a courthouse; church restored 1970s; now in parochial use	Holy Trinity Priory	52°39′15″N 7°15′28″W
Kilkenny Carmelite Friary		listed as not restored c.1737 (Note: Arch. Ord. Rome (Carmelite Order), Manuscripts II, C.O. II, 26, p.13 (compiled 1739-59))		
Kilkenny Cathedral Monastery^{+}		early monastic site, founded before 599/600 by St Canice; episcopal diocesan cathedral 1111; extant		52°39′15″N 7°15′27″W
Kilkenny Grey Friary		Franciscan Friars Minor, Conventual founded 1232-40; dissolved 1540; granted to the Sovereign and the commonality of Kilkenny 1543; friars expelled by John Bale c.1550; returned 1553; expelled 1559, abandoned; Observant Franciscan Friars reformed 1609; convent refounded 1612; refounded 1640	The Abbey Church of Saint Francis, Kilkenny	52°39′21″N 7°15′13″W
Kilkenny Hospitallers		Knights Hospitaller "liberum hospicum" 1335; "frankehouse" 1541		
Kilkenny Hospital		Knights of St Thomas of Acon founded before 1219 by William Marshall, Earl of Pembroke, confirmed to the knights and brothers by charter of Gilbert Marshall, Earl of Pembroke	The Hospital of Saint John the Baptist	
Kilkenny, St John's Priory		hospital, founded c.1202 by William Marshal the elder, Earl of Pembroke; Augustinian Canons Regular founded 1211; dissolved 1540, surrendered by Richard Cantwell, 19 March; in parochial use by 4 January 1541; granted to the Mayor and citizens of Kilkenny	Hospital of St John the Evangelist; The Priory Church of Saint John, Kilkenny ____________________; St John's Priory without the walls; St John the Baptist	
Kilkenny Nunnery				
Kilkieran Monastery		early monastic site, high crosses	Cell-cainnig; Canocopolis	52°23′52″N 7°22′51″W
Killaloe Monastery		early monastic site, founded c.540 by St Mochua	Cell-molua	52°34′55″N 7°26′26″W (approx)
Killamery Monastery		early monastic site, possibly founded c.632 by St Gobhan; probably not continuing after 10th century	Cell-Lamhraighe; Killamruidhe	52°30′44″N 7°25′48″W (approx)
Killenny Abbey		possible Benedictine monks founded 1162-5, site granted by Dermot O'Ryan, liegeman of Dermot Mac Murrough, King of Leinster, to Felix Ua Duib Sláin, Abbot of Ossory, confirmed by Dermot; Cistercian monks — from Jerpoint founded 1184; united to Graiguenamanagh 22 July 1227, confirmed by Stephen of Lexington grange of Graiguenamanagh; granted to Charles Cavenagh, Abbot of Graiguenamanagh for 61 years 10 June 1525; dissolved 1540, remaining in possession of Cavenagh at least until 1548, unknown whether monks remained in occupation	St Mary and St Benedict ____________________; Vallis Dei; Glandy; Barrowmount; Old Abbey	
Kilmanagh Monastery		early monastic site, founded before 563? by St Natalis (or Notan); probably not continuing after 10th century	Cell-na-manach	52°37′16″N 7°25′42″W (?)
Kilree Monastery		early monastic site, reputedly founded by St Brigid; apparently erroneous reference to foundation of an abbey 1176	Cell-righ	52°31′05″N 7°16′07″W
Knocktopher Friary^{^}		Carmelite Friars founded 1356 by James Butler, 2nd Earl of Ormond for the friars already in the town; dissolved before c.1541; granted to Margaret, Countess of Ormond; friars returned 17th century; expelled before 1654; friars returned 1735; convent in existence 1737; remains incorporated into private house, currently in use as a guest house named 'Knocktopher Abbey'	St Mary; The Friary of St Saviour (Note: Lord Killanin & M. V. Duignan, Shell Guide to Ireland, 1962, (new edition 1967), pp.343-4)	52°28′59″N 7°13′00″W
Knocktopher Carmelite Friary *		Carmelite Friars returned 1735; convent in existence 1737; new church consecrated 1843; extant		52°28′57″N 7°12′52″W
Loghmere Abbey		Cistercian monks — from Stanley, Wiltshire founded c.1202/4; transferred to Anothmolt before 1207	Loughmerans Abbey	52°40′58″N 7°15′41″W (approx)
Ossarge Abbey		Benedictine monks dependent on Wurzburg; founded before 1148? (before 1162-5); if Kilkenny, apparently transferred to Jerpoint in, or soon after, 1165; dissolved 1541	Ossory; possibly Jerpoint; possibly Kilkenny	
Rosbercon Abbey		Dominican friars founded 1267, purportedly by the Grace family or the Walsh family; dissolved 1539, surrendered by Prior Matthew Flemynge 20 June	St Mary; The Assumption of the Blessed Virgin Mary	
Shankill Monastery		"site of Abbey"	Seincheall	52°41′09″N 7°03′31″W (approx)
Tibberaghny Monastery		early monastic site, founded 6th century, patronised by St Mo-Dhomnog of Lann Beachaire	Tipra-fachtnai	52°20′46″N 7°21′33″W (approx)
Tiscoffin Monastery		early monastic site, 'cella' founded 6th century by St Scuithin (Scuithin)	Tech-scruithin; Tech-scoithin; Tascoffin	52°40′42″N 7°06′01″W (approx)
Tullaherin Monastery		early monastic site, reputedly founded by St Cainnnech; round tower on site	Tulach-tirm; Tulach-Iarain	52°34′44″N 7°07′41″W
Tullamaine Monastery		early monastic site; plundered 1026	Tealach-dimainn; Tealach-n-ionmainne	
Ullard Monastery		early monastic site, founded before 670 by St Fiachra high cross (9th c.) and ruined church (12th c.)		52°34′49″N 6°55′59″W
Woolengrange ^{~}		Cistercian monks grange of Jerpoint; leased out 1541		

== Map link to lists of monastic houses in Ireland by county ==
Click on a county to go to the corresponding article.	Antrim; Armagh; Down; Fermanagh; Londonderry; Tyrone; Carlow; Cavan; Clare; Cork; Donegal; Dublin; Galway; Kerry; Kildare; Kilkenny; Laois; Leitrim; Limerick; Longford; Louth; Mayo; Meath; Monaghan; Offaly; Roscommon; Sligo; Tipperary; Waterford; Westmeath; Wexford; Wicklow

== See also ==
- List of monastic houses in Ireland
