= Kells Castle =

Castle in Kells, County Kilkenny, Ireland

- Móta Cheanannais (Irish)
- Kells Motte
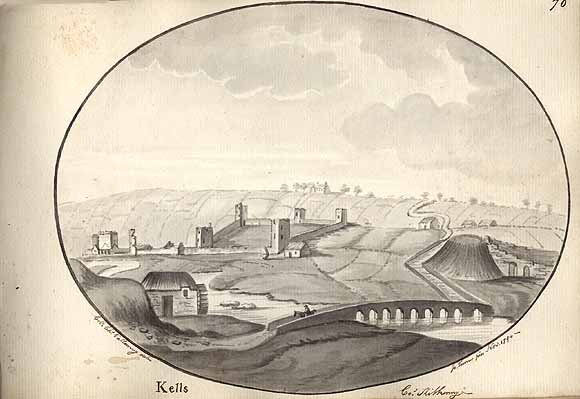
- Panorama of Kells in 1794. Motte is visible to the right.

- Location within Ireland
- 52.541647°N 7.272985°W
- Type: motte
- Periods: Norman Ireland
- Cultures: Cambro-Norman
- Associated with: Normans
- Location: Kells Road, Kells, County Kilkenny, Ireland
- Region: Kings River Valley

History
- Built: late 12th century
- Built by: Geoffrey FitzRobert

Site notes
- Material: earth
- Diameter: 12 m (39 ft)
- Public access: yes

Designations
- Designation

National monument of Ireland
- Official name: Kells Castle
- Reference no.: 626

Kells Castle or Kells Motte is a motte-and-bailey and National Monument in Kells, County Kilkenny, Ireland.

== Location ==
Kells Castle is located just south of the Kells Bridge which crosses the Kings River, immediately behind Delaney's Bar.

== History and archaeology ==
Motte-and-bailey castles were a primitive type of castle built after the Norman invasion, a mound of earth topped by a wooden palisade and tower. Kells motte was built on a gravel platform (possibly originally an island in the Kings River) by Geoffrey FitzRobert in the late 12th century. It was an important site for extending Norman colonisation and economic exploitation in the region, which was formerly the Gaelic Irish Kingdom of Osraige. It was abandoned by the following century when the focus of the town shifted to the bailey, and later to Kells Priory.
