= Burnchurch Castle =

15th-century tower house in County Kilkenny, Ireland

- Caisleán an Teampaill Loiscthe
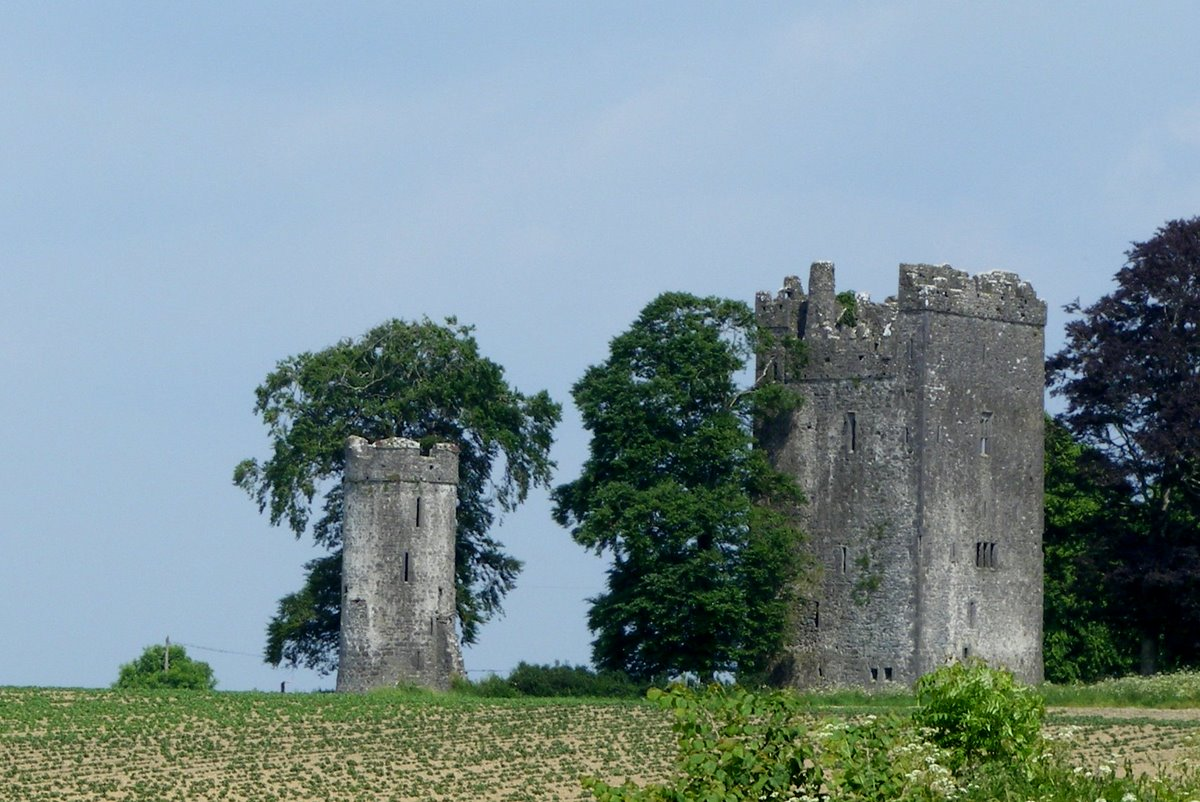
- Burnchurch Castle and Turret
- Interactive map of the Burnchurch Castle area

General information
- Type: Tower house
- Location: County Kilkenny, Ireland
- Coordinates: 52.5759°N 7.2969°W
- Construction started: 15th century

National monument of Ireland
- Reference no.: 321

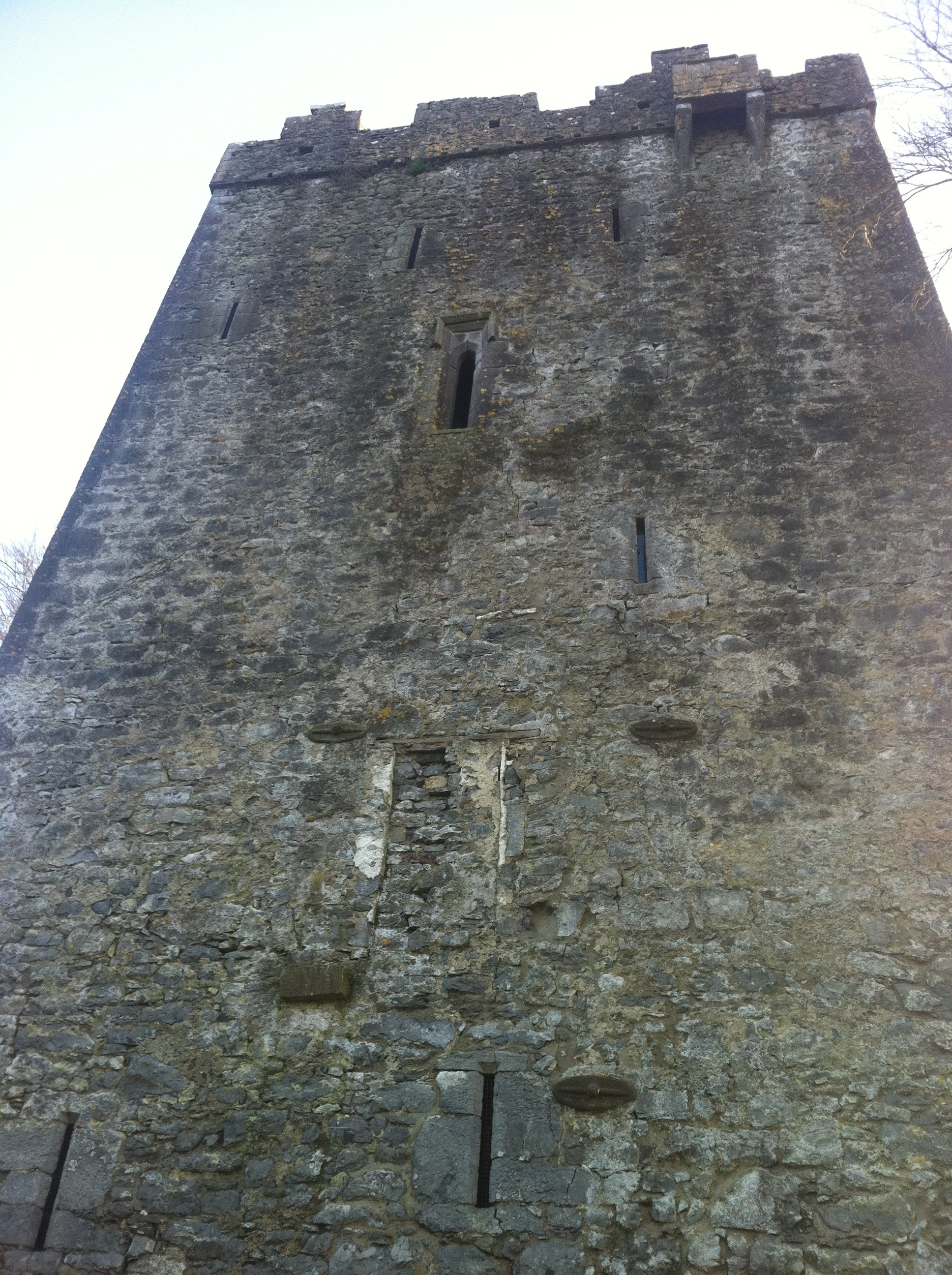
Burnchurch Castle

Burnchurch Castle is a well-preserved 15th century Norman tower house with a round gate tower, located in the parish of Burnchurch, County Kilkenny, Ireland. Burnchurch Castle and tower, along with the nearby Church of Ireland church and lime trees, became a National Monument in 1993.

The tower house is said to have been built and owned by the Fitzgeralds of the house of Desmond in the 15th or 16th century. It continued to be occupied until 1817. It is 6.5 km (4.0 mi) south west of Kilkenny, off the Clonmel Road, 6 km from Ballybur near Cuffesgrange, outside the town of Callan, near to Kells Priory. It is located in Burnchurch parish and was in the barony of Shillelogher.

== Architecture ==
The castle's 12.5m high circular turret still remains. A walled courtyard was originally attached to the castle. It is six storeys high, and has an unusually large number of passages and chambers inside the walls. A great hall was formerly attached to the tower's outside wall, but this has now vanished, as has most a bawn with a 41 foot tall tower at one corner. Old drawings, date unknown, show remnants of buildings.

Many tower houses have mural chambers and passages hidden away within their walls, though few have the number and complexity of those found in Burnchurch Castle. Beneath there is a vault with the principal chamber above, lying just below a gabled roof. There are numerous narrow rooms in the walls, including a "secret room" on the fourth floor.

A curved outside staircase still provides access to the three upper floors of this little tower so it can be explored. It has mullioned windows and is noteworthy for its finely carved fireplace with a joggled voussoir arch and its tall round chimney. The rounded chimney may be a later improvement.

It is broadly similar in size and layout to Clara Castle in Clara, but differs in that the gable-end walls are carried up one story higher than the other two walls and form to elongated turrets with their won rampart walls at the highest part of the building. Burnchurch Castle and Clara are good examples of the characteristic Irish-style of stepped battlements.

It is known for being one of several Irish towers with the slightly narrower sides of the castle extending up an additional floor, creating in essence a pair of tower wide turrets.

== See also ==
- List of National Monuments in County Kilkenny
