= Callan Augustinian Friary =

Ruined Augustinian Friary in Kilkenny, Ireland

- Mainistir Agaistínigh Challainn
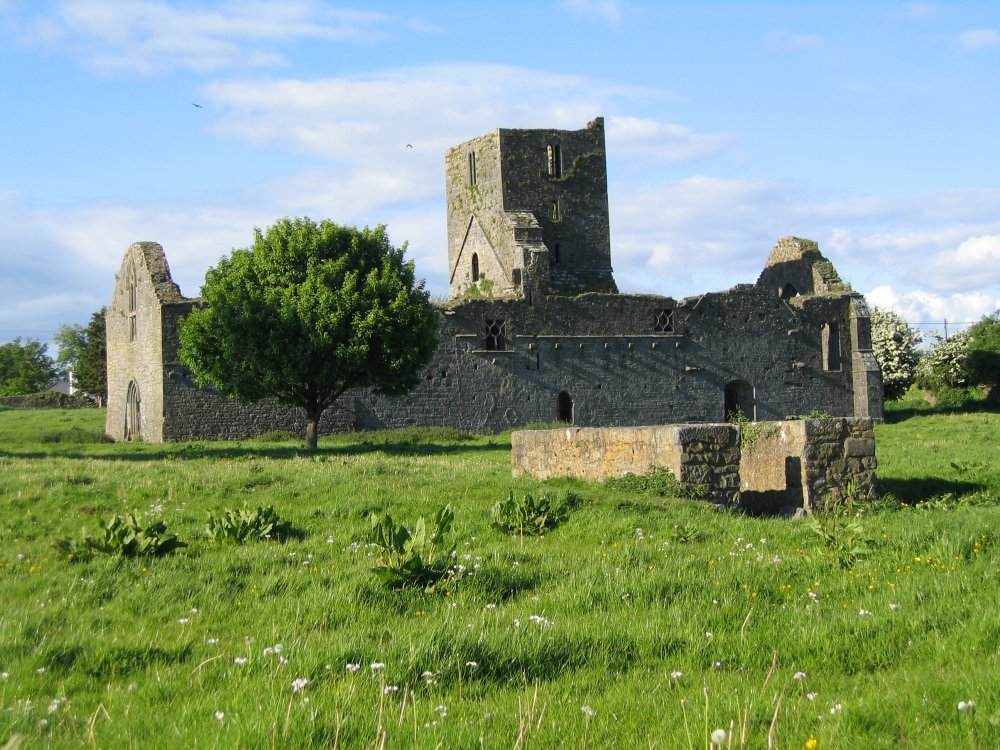
- The church and bell tower (background) and well (foreground) of Callan Augustinian Friary

Monastery information
- Order: Augustinians
- Established: c.1461

Architecture
- Status: Inactive

Site
- Coordinates: 52.5458°N 7.3873°W
- Public access: Yes

National monument of Ireland
- Official name: Callan Abbey
- Reference no.: 475

Remains of Abbeys bell tower and east window

The Callan Augustinian Friary (Irish: Mainistir Agaistínigh Challainn) is an Augustinian friary in Callan, County Kilkenny, Ireland. Originally founded in the 15th century, it is located in what is known locally as the "Abbey Meadow", in the north-east of the town, on the banks of the Kings River. The friary forms part of the Callan Heritage Trail, which opened in May 2024.

== History ==
In 1461, Edmund MacRichard Butler successfully petitioned Pope Pius II for the foundation of the friary. After Edmund died in 1462, the buildings were erected by his son, James Butler who is regarded as the founder of the monastery. The foundation date of the friary is typically given as 1471, is likely to have actually been two or three years earlier, in 1468 or 1469.

In 1472 the friary became observant—its community adopted the fashion then spreading across Europe for the strictest observance of the monastic rules — and in 1479 it became the centre of the Irish Observant Congregation.

The friary was dissolved and its lands confiscated by the order of Henry VIII in 1540. It passed into the hands of the Earls of Ormond.

The history of the Augustinians in Callan from 1540 - 1766 is now lost, but it is known that members of the order returned to the monastery, and there is a wealth of documentary evidence indicating that Augustinian friars were resident in Callan from the mid 17th century.

A new monastery for the Augustinian friars was founded in the town of Callan in 1766. This was closed by the order in Easter 2001.

== Architecture ==
The friary church is a long, rectangular building with a central bell-tower. The east end or choir, is lit by an east window and in its south wall is one of the finest sedilia (a seat for officiating priests) in Ireland.

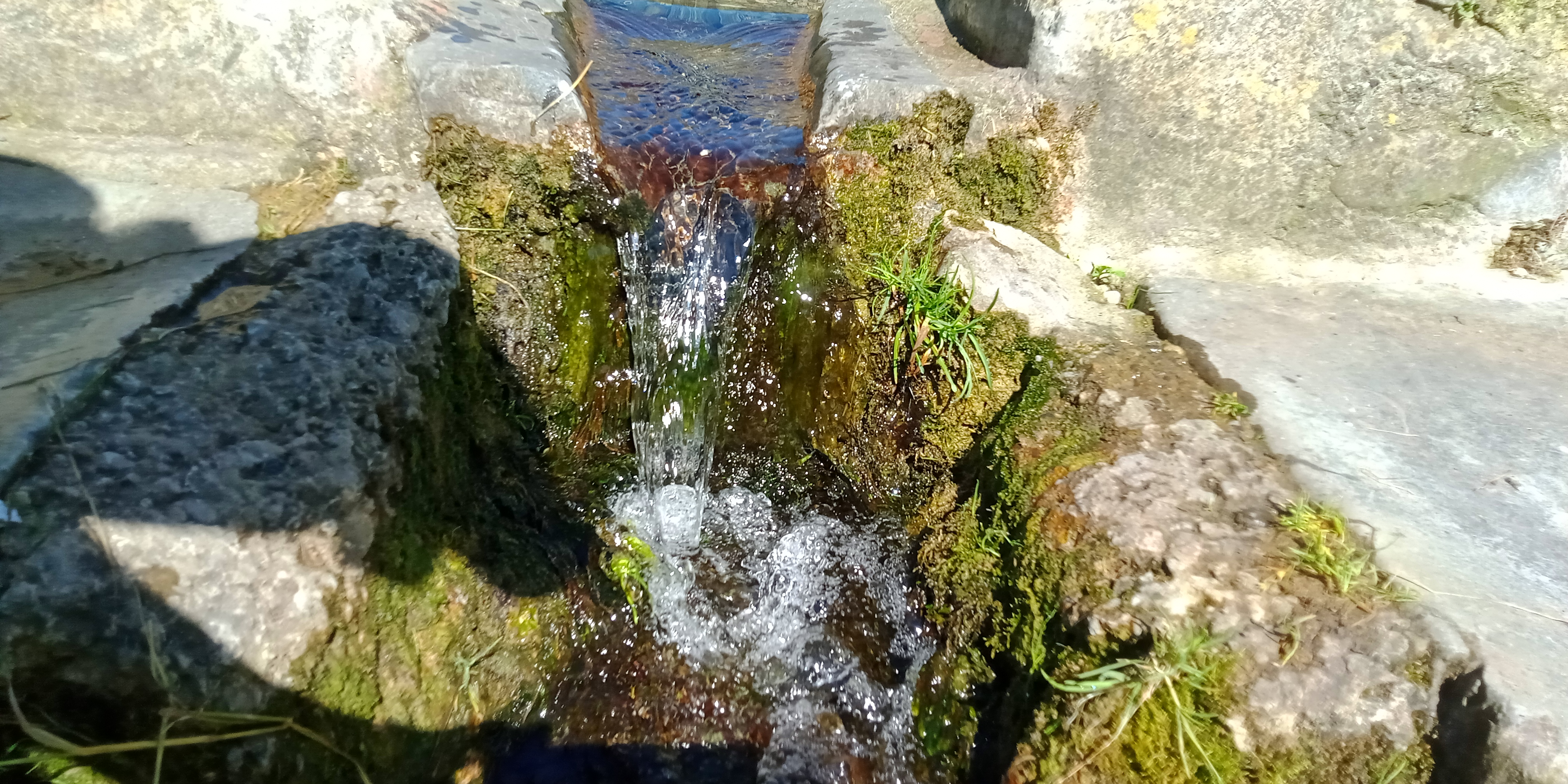
Detail of the outlet at the well

While the domestic buildings and the cloister court no longer survive, a freshwater well remains on the grounds of the abbey. This well, known as "Saint Augustine's Well" or the "Abbey Well", is situated at the southern end of the abbey site in what is now usually referred to as Abbey Meadow. It is recorded in the Record of Monuments and Places (RMP) as a holy well, with record number "KK026-010018-", and contains limestone gutter-spout which might have been part of the abbey. The well is a rectangular area of c. 1.2-3m surrounded by a wall with an opening to the south from where the water flows to join the King's River.

The Callan-born poet, John Locke, described the well in his 1885 poem The Old Abbey Well. In the poem, he describes how "a drink from its depths [..] Would act on one's frame like a magical spell", and that "nothing in life so refreshing [..] As the water which shone in the old abbey well". According to local folklore, the water from the holy well was used as a cure for swellings and strains.

== See also ==
- List of National Monuments in County Kilkenny
- List of abbeys and priories in Ireland (County Kilkenny)
