= Kilree =

Christian monastery located in County Kilkenny, Ireland

- Cill Rí
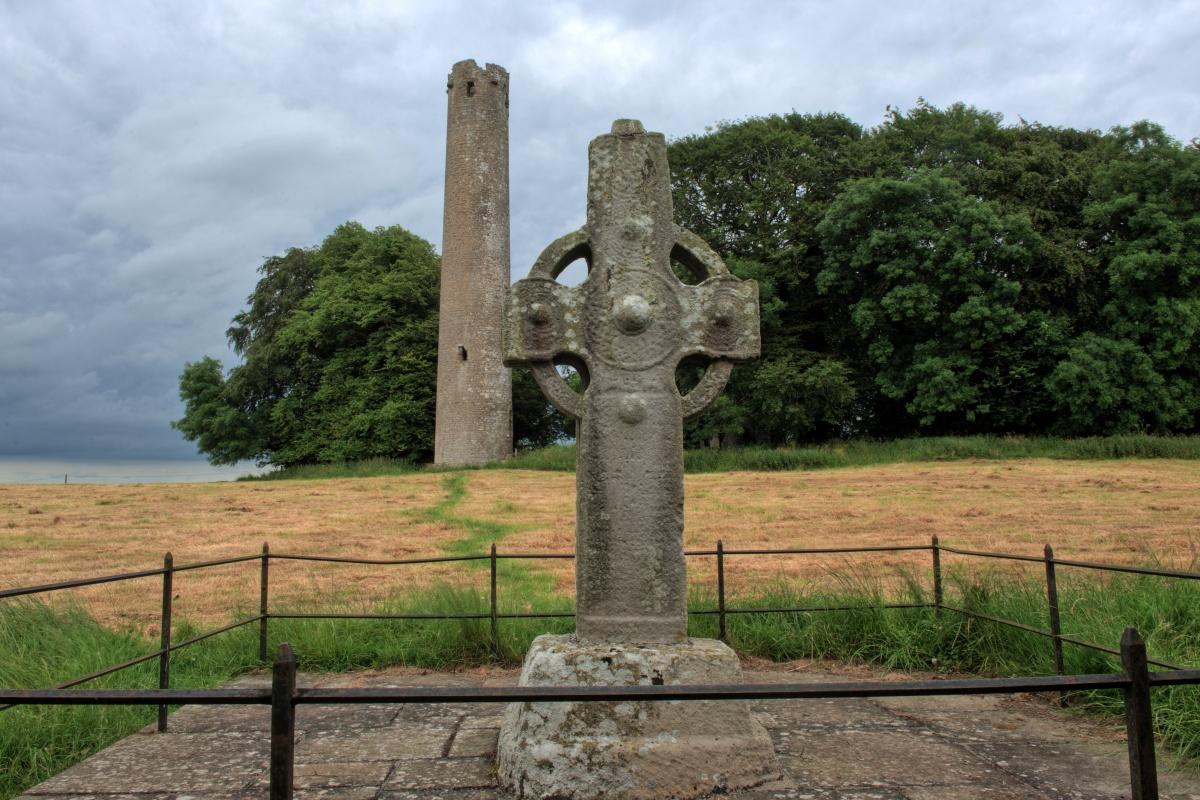

- Location within Ireland
- Interactive map of Kilree

Monastery information
- Other names: Cell-righ; Cill Ruidhehi; Kell Rudi
- Established: 6th century
- Disestablished: 1539
- Diocese: Ossory

People
- Founder: Rhuidche

Architecture
- Status: ruined
Heritage designation
Designations
National monument of Ireland
- Official name: Kilree
- Reference no.: 76
- Style: Celtic monastic

Site
- Location: Kilree, Kells, County Kilkenny
- Coordinates: 52.518056°N 7.268611°W
- Visible remains: church, round tower, cross
- Public access: yes

Kilree is a former Christian monastery and national monument located in County Kilkenny, Ireland.

== Location ==
Kilree is located 2.4 km (1 1/2 mile) south of Kells, County Kilkenny.

== History ==
The monastery at Kilree was supposedly founded in the 6th century by Saint Rhuidche, from which the name Cell-righ derives.

Niall Caille, High King of Ireland, is locally believed to have drowned in the Kings River at Callan in AD 846 and his body washed up near Kells, County Kilkenny. However the Annals of the Four Masters and Annals of Inishfallen are clear the king drowned in the river Callan near Armagh. Some local histories claim he was buried under the high cross at Kilree, others that he was buried outside the church grounds there because he was a pagan. The Annals however record he was heavily involved in a power struggle between two dominant monastic traditions - that of Patrick versus Brigit, with Niall favouring the latter, so the tale of his paganism is not credible. He was primarily the king of Ailech, which was in western County Londonderry, again making it unlikely he is connected with Kilree.

The site came into the possession of Kells Priory by 1340. It was surrendered to Henry VIII in 1539, and he granted the abbot a life pension.

== Buildings ==
=== Church ===
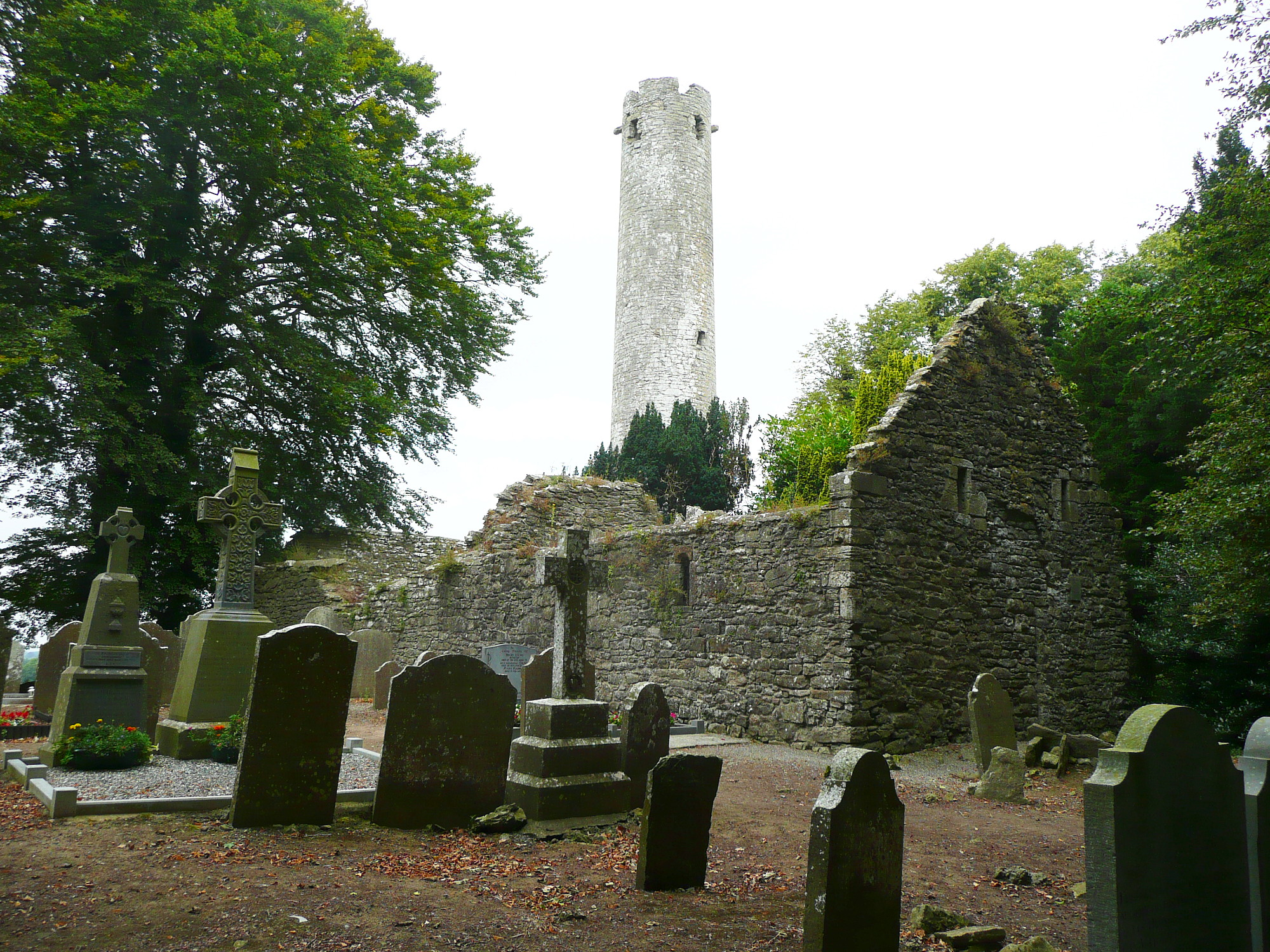
The church wall and bell tower

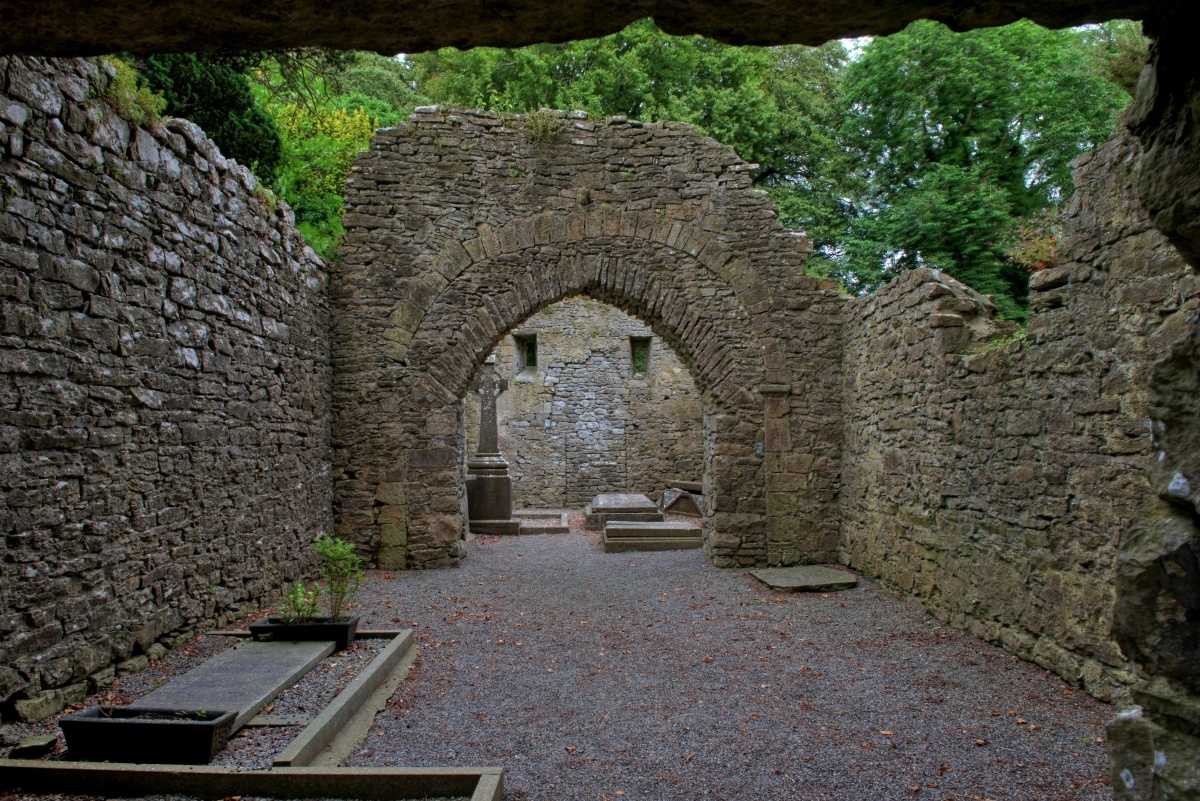
Kilree Church insides

This is an early church with pronounced antae, indicating that it is pre-Romanesque in date. It still retains its oval enclosure.

=== Round tower ===
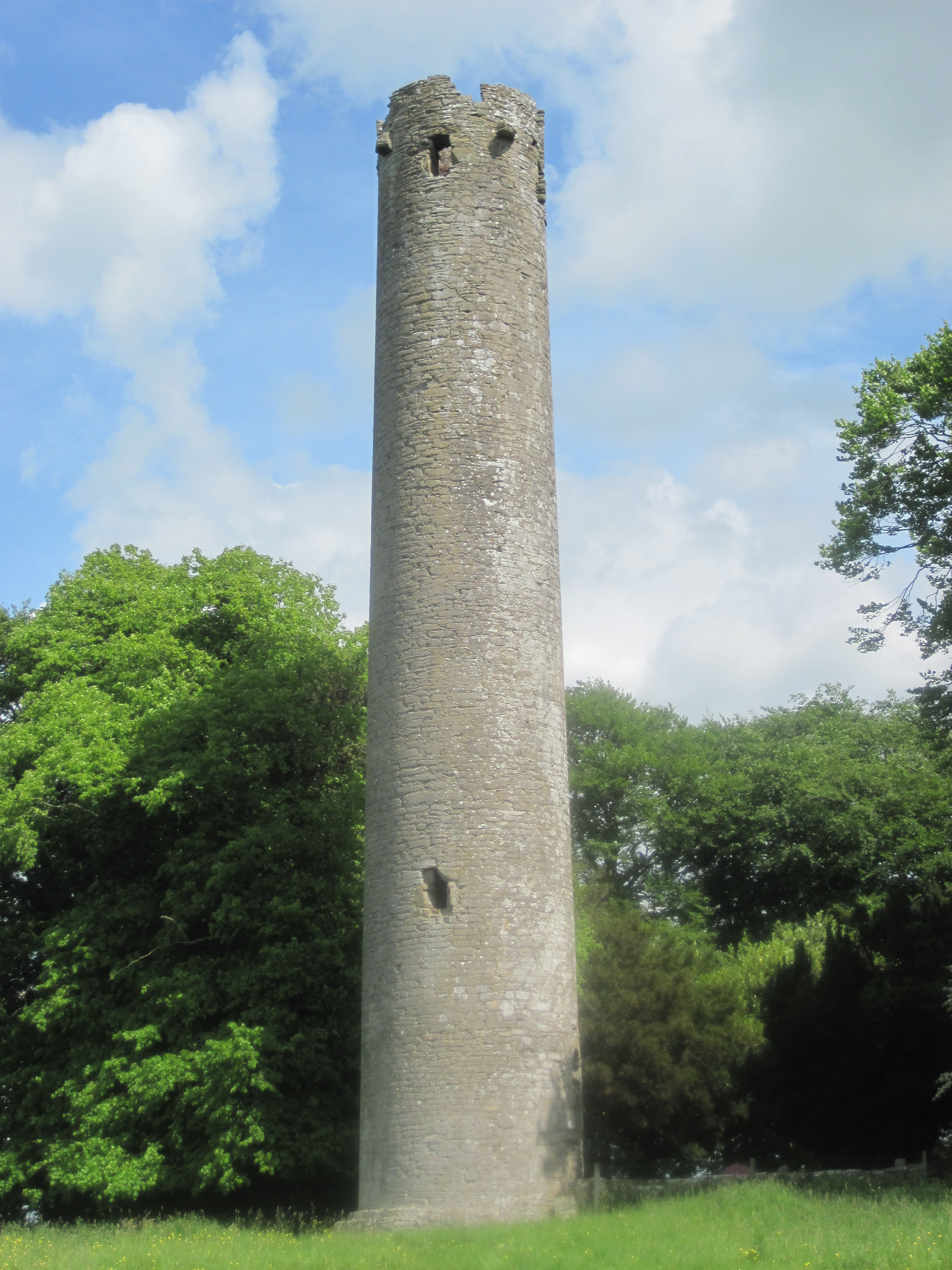
Round tower

The round tower is about 26 m (85 ft) tall, depending on which ground level it is measured from. The arched sandstone doorway is 1.64 m (5 ft 5 in) above ground level and is framed by moulding. The bell-storey has four lintelled windows facing the cardinal directions. The cap is gone but battlements remain.

The tower stands on a rectangular stone pad-foundation, only found here and at Aghaviller.

=== High cross ===
Kilree High Cross was erected in the 8th/9th Century. It is 2.75 m (9 ft 0 in) tall and covered with bosses and geometric designs. The east face has a hunting scene. The west face has a central boss with four outer bosses surrounding it. The west face depicts the Adoration of the Magi and Daniel in the Lions' Den.

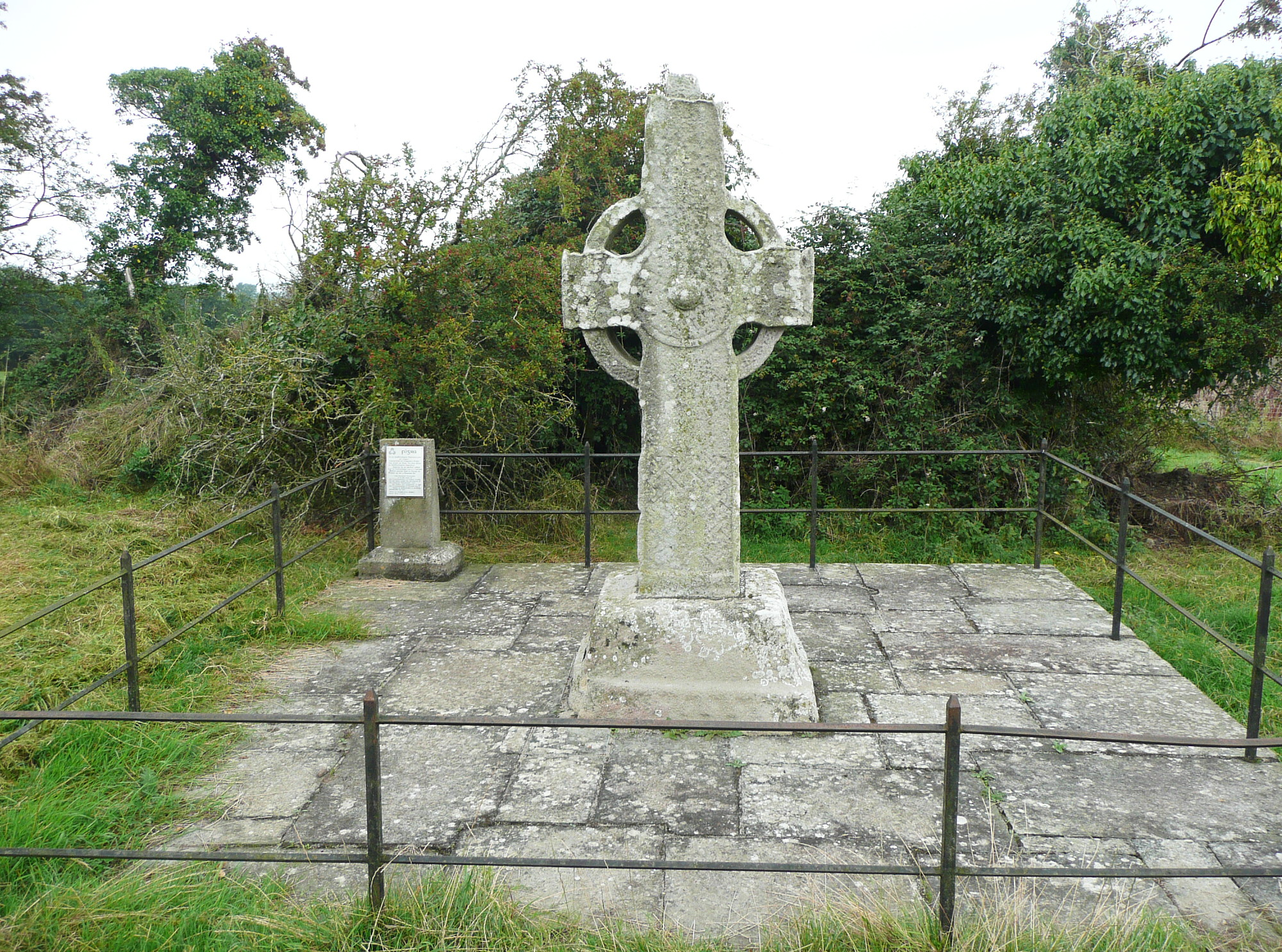
Kilree High Cross
