= Aghaviller =

- Áth an Bhiolair
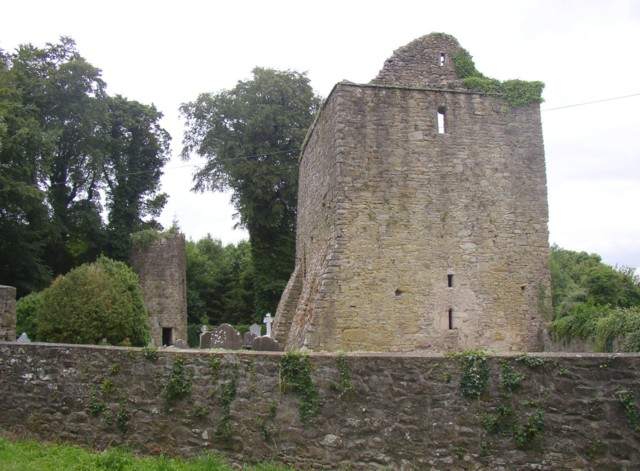
- Ruined church and round tower

- Location within Ireland
- Former names: Aghavirrer

General information
- Type: Church and round tower
- Location: County Kilkenny, Ireland
- Coordinates: 52°27′59″N 7°16′3.25″W
- Construction started: 12th century

National monument of Ireland
- Reference no.: 334

Aghaviller (Irish: Áth an Bhiolair, meaning 'field of the watercress') is the site of a church and round tower in County Kilkenny, Ireland. It is a protected national monument.

Aghaviller gives its name to the wider townland, civil parish, and electoral district.

Located south of Kilkenny, about 12 kilometres southwest of Thomastown near Knocktopher.

== Etymology ==
The Annals of the Four Masters call it Achadh-biorair (Ahabirrer), meaning the field of watercresses. Tighe refers to Agha-oillir, meaning field of the pilgrim.

== Church and tower ==
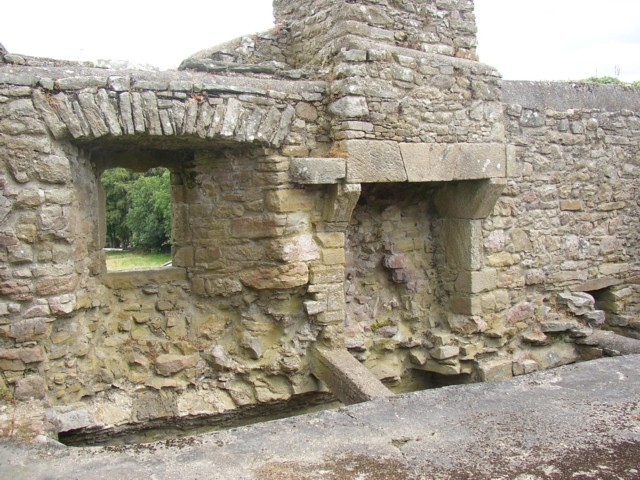
Interior of Aghaviller ruined church

A few yards distant from the site of the old church, is the remains of the lower part of an ancient round tower composed of breccia.

The Statistical Survey of 1802, makes reference to the tower, (Note: Tighe's description of the tower: "A fifth tower stood at Aghaviller, (probably Agha-oillir, field of the pilgrim) the lower part only remains; above the foundation it measured fifty feet round; beneath this, it has a circular base, projecting six inches, and fourteen inches high, resting on a square foundation; that at Kilree is built in the same way, as the others probably are: this tower is peculiar by having a door-way even with the ground, and apparently co-eval with the building; this door way is five feet one inch high, two feet nine inches wide at top, and from two to three feet wide at bottom: internal diameter of the building, eight feet ten inches, wall four feet thick, two courses remain for floors, and part of a third story with a small window: on the first, an old floor is remembered to have stood about forty years ago. The first story within, is twelve feet high; without, it is thirteen feet to the old door way, which this had, like others, opening to the first floor, but which has been modernly walled up. The tower stands twenty feet to the S. of the foundation of the old church and at the S. W. angle; it is built of siliceous breccia.") as does the 1855 Kilkenny Archaeological Society. (Note: O'Neill's description of the tower:: "The pillar tower is fifty-one feet in circumference at the base; hence the diameter is sixteen feet two inches. There are two doorways; one at the ground level, of cut stone, rectangular, with places for hanging-irons; a small bolt hole and a rabate are on the inside; it is five feet two inches high by two feet ten and a half inches wide and looks N.E. The other doorway, and in all probability the original one is about 13 feet up from the ground to the door-still. The higher and narrow that on one below, and looks north. A rectangular open, of dressed stone, is situated at about twenty-seven feet up; it may be three feet high by two wide; its aspect is S.S.W. The tower terminates a few feet above this open, begin only a dilapidated stump." "At about twelve, and twenty-six feet high, from the ground level, there are, on the inside, bearing-courses made of flag-stones about six inches thick and projecting four inches- the wall above them recesses for a short way. The inside of the tower is rather rough, but on the outside, where not weathered, the wall is very smooth, of excellent stone, carefully spawned, and dressed to the curve." "If this pillar-tower had originally the usual proportions of such building, it was in all probability at least on hundred and ten feet high.")

It is one of five round towers located around the county, the others are at Kilkenny, Tullaherin, Kilree and Grangefertagh. The tower is different from many round towers as it has two doors. Nearby is a holy well and Castlemorres Demesne.

== Civil parish ==
In 1851, the civil parish of Aghaviller contained the townlands of Aghaviller, Ballinteskin, Ballinva, Barnadown, Bartonsfarm, Boolyglass, Brownstown, Carrickmerlin, Castlemorris, Catstown, Coalpitparks, Condonstown, Croan, Hugginstown, Kingsmountain or Mylerstown, Kyleva, Mabbotstown, Mylerstown or Kingsmountain, Newmarket and Westmoreland.

== Roman Catholic parish ==
Part of civil parish of Aghaviller is in the Roman Catholic Parish of Aghaviller (earliest record: b. Oct 1847; m. Feb 1848), and part is in the Roman Catholic Ballyhale Parish (earliest record: b. Aug 1823; m. 1876). It was included within the union of Knocktopher or Ballyhale. Ballyhale was part of Aghaviller Catholic parish prior to September 1847.

== See also ==
- List of National Monuments in County Kilkenny
- List of National Monuments in Ireland
