= Callan Motte =

- Móta Challainn (Irish)
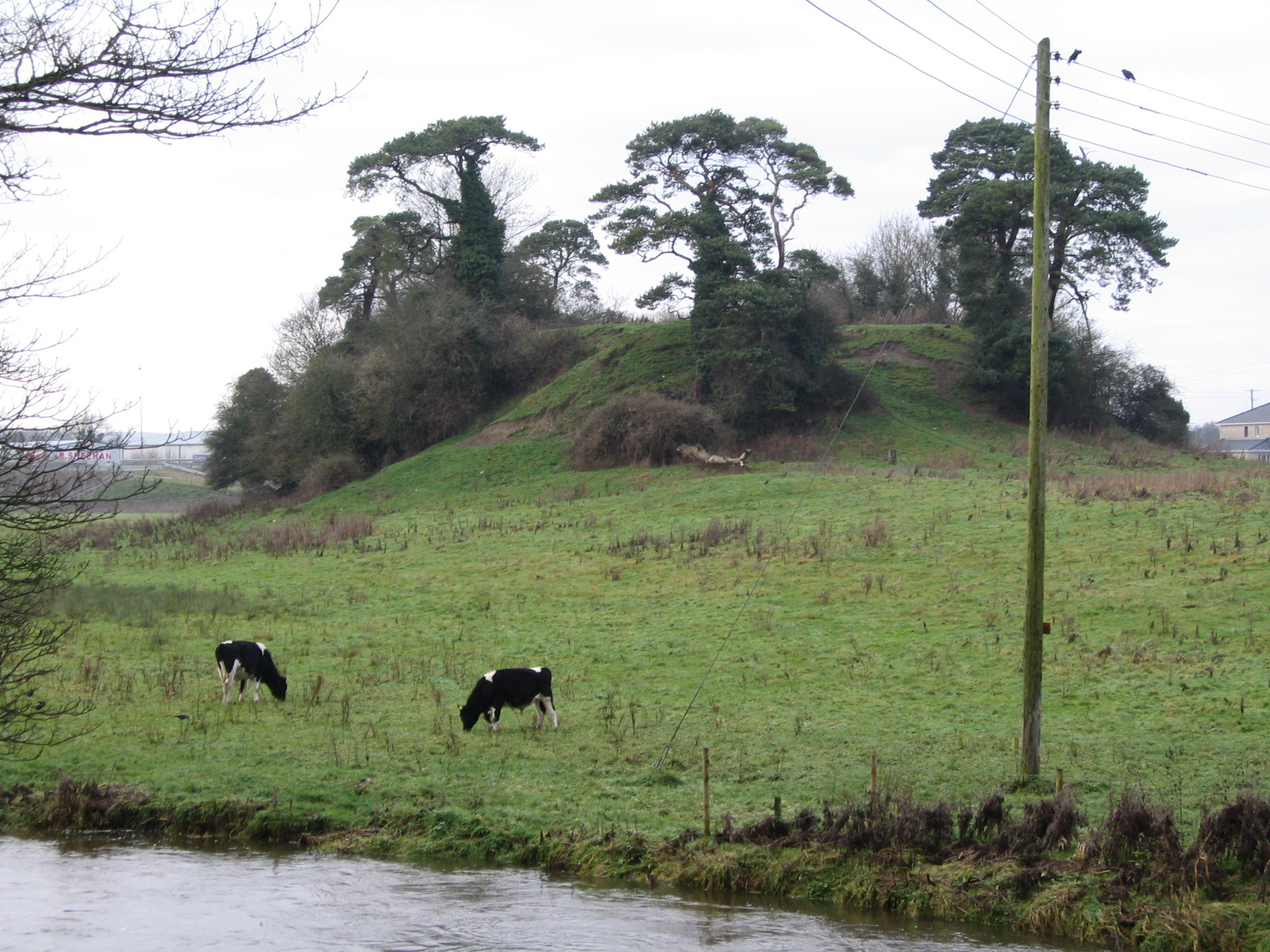

- Location within Ireland
- 52.546657°N 7.391781°W
- Type: motte
- Periods: Norman Ireland
- Cultures: Cambro-Norman, Old English
- Associated with: Normans
- Location: Westcourt Demesne, Callan, County Kilkenny, Ireland
- Region: Kings River Valley

History
- Built: c. 1217
- Built by: Geoffrey FitzRobert

Site notes
- Material: earth
- Height: 12 metres (39 ft)
- Length: 66 m (217 ft) (at base)
- Width: 48 m (157 ft) (at base)
- Area: 780 m^{2} (8,400 sq ft) (summit area)
- Diameter: 40 m (130 ft)
- Public access: yes

National monument of Ireland
- Official name: Callan Motte
- Reference no.: 372

Callan Motte is a motte-and-bailey and National Monument in Callan, Ireland.

== Location ==
Callan Motte is in the centre of Callan, north of the Kings River, west of Upper Bridge Street and east of the N76. The eastward facing base of the Motte is situated approximately 100m from the King's River and its floodplain. This floodplain extends along the western riverbank, interrupted only by a small series of riverside residences adjoining both sides of the bridge.

As of January 2021, the immediate area is currently being developed to provide pedestrian and disabled access via a graduated tarmac walkway. This includes significant access improvements to the adjoining Moat Lane. This walkway was submerged by seasonal flooding in early December 2000 and is not expected to subside until at least April 2001, when the damage can be assessed. Due to ongoing COVID19 restrictions, an expected completion date is currently indeterminate.

== History and archaeology ==
Motte-and-bailey castles were a primitive type of castle built after the Norman invasion, a mound of earth topped by a wooden palisade and tower.

Callan Motte was built c. 1217 by Geoffrey FitzRobert, seneschal to William Marshal, 1st Earl of Pembroke. In 1307 it was described as ‘a castle, in which there is a hall constructed of wood covered with wooden shingles, a stone chamber, a kitchen and other wooden chambers’. It was abandoned as a lordly residence in the 14th century.

Local legend claims that cannons were placed on the Motte by Oliver Cromwell's soldiers during the 1650 Siege of Callan.

== Moat Carnivals ==
The Motte known locally as 'The Moat', came to prominence again for several years between the late 1950s and 1963 when week-long Moat Carnivals were held on the Moat field and on the hill where the castle once stood. Marquees holding several hundred were erected and lengthy dancing sessions brought the hilltop to life. The annual highlight was the crowning of the 'Carnival Queen. Future legendary RTE radio personality Larry Gogan crowned the final 1963 Carnival Queen. These dances were extremely popular and to safely accommodate the increasing number of attendees were subsequently relocated to a very large Marquee on the Fairgreen which was erected for several months each year until the mid 1980s. Another annual highlight was the Street Leagues, which pitted teams representing Callan’s streets against each other in hurling or football games.

== Information Panels ==
As part of the redevelopment of the Moat Field, information panels have been installed around the Moat field. These panels highlight the historical, social, and flora and fauna of the Moat Field.
