= Rathealy Ringfort =

Ancient ringfort in County Kilkenny, Ireland

- Ráth Éalaigh (Irish)
- Stuaic of Rathealy
- Location within Ireland
- 52.694722°N 7.432500°W
- Type: ringfort
- Periods: Early Christian Ireland
- Associated with: Gaelic Irish
- Location: Rathealy, Tullaroan, County Kilkenny, Ireland
- Region: Nore Valley

History
- Built: 6th–12th century
- Built by: Síol Elaigh

Site notes
- Material: earth
- Elevation: 247 m (810 ft)
- Height: 3 m (9.8 ft)
- Area: 0.8 ha (2.0 acres)
- Diameter: 99 m (325 ft)
- Public access: yes

National monument of Ireland
- Official name: Rathealy
- Reference no.: 376

Rathealy Ringfort is a ringfort (rath) and National Monument located in County Kilkenny, Ireland.

== Location ==
Rathealy Ringfort is located on a hilltop 3.5 km (2.2 mi) north of Tullaroan.

== History ==
Rathealy is believed to derive its name from Élothach mac Fáelchon, king of the Uí Cheinnselaig of South Leinster. There is a surrounding wall 3 m (9.8 ft) high and a ditch 6 m (20 ft) deep. It also known as the Stuaic of Rathealy, the Irish word meaning "peak" or "spike". A standing stone nearby may be pre-Christian.

== Description ==
Rathealy Ringfort is a trivallate rath with a rectangular house, circular house and souterrain entrance clearly visible.
