= Thomastown Church =

- Cill Bhaile Mhic Andáin
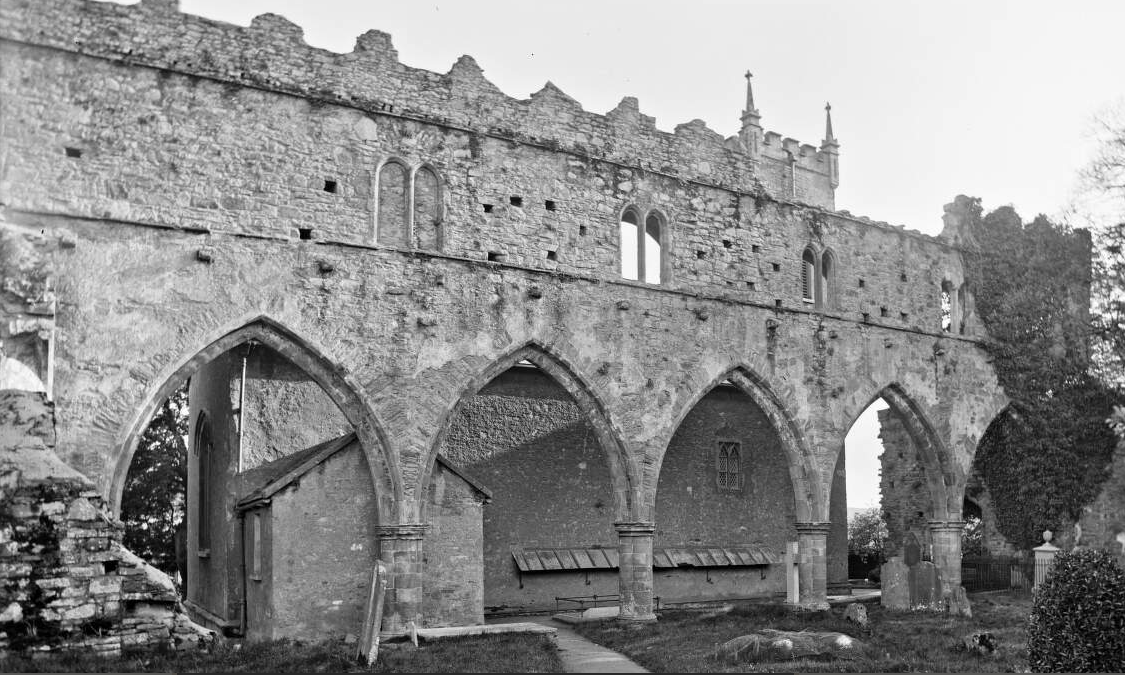
- Aisle arcade

- Location within Ireland
- 52.526122°N 7.139052°W
- Location: Pipe Street, Thomastown, County Kilkenny
- Country: Ireland
- Denomination: Church of Ireland
- Previous denomination: Pre-Reformation Catholic

History
- Founder: Thomas FitzAnthony

Architecture
- Functional status: inactive
- Heritage designation

National monument of Ireland
- Official name: Thomastown Church
- Reference no.: 191
- Style: French Gothic
- Years built: between 1215 and 1229

Administration
- Diocese: Ossory

Thomastown Church is a medieval church and National Monument in County Kilkenny, Ireland.

== Location ==
Thomastown Church is located in the centre of Thomastown, immediately behind the Protestant Church and north of the River Nore.

== History ==
The church was founded by Thomas FitzAnthony, a Cambro-Norman knight who was granted land here in 1215 by John, King of England and Lord of Ireland. It belonged to Inistioge Augustinian Priory (est. 1210). It may also have had Dominican associations. After the Reformation the nave was modified for use by the Anglican Church of Ireland. In 1809 the present Church of Ireland church was built on the site of the south aisle which was restored and converted for use as a private dwelling 2003-2004.

== Church ==
Thomastown Church was built as a nave and chancel with north and south aisles. The ruins today consist of the north aisle arcade (five arches with quatrefoil pillars, decorated capitals and clerestory) the west gable and a fragment of the crossing tower.
