= John Locke (poet) =

- Born: 26 July 1847; Callan, County Kilkenny, Ireland
- Died: 31 January 1889 (aged 41); New York City, United States
- Spouse: Mary Cooney (m. 1882)
- Children: 1
- Writing career
- Language: English
- Period: 1863–1880s
- Subject: Irish nationalism
- Notable works: "Morning on the Irish Coast" "Evening Twilight on a Tipperary Hillside" "Old Abbey Well" "Calm Avon Ree"
- Literary movement: Symbolism

John Locke (26 July 1847 – 31 January 1889) was an Irish writer and Fenian activist, exiled to the United States, and most famous for writing "Dawn on the Irish Coast", also known as "The Exiles Return, or Morning on the Irish coast".

== Early life ==
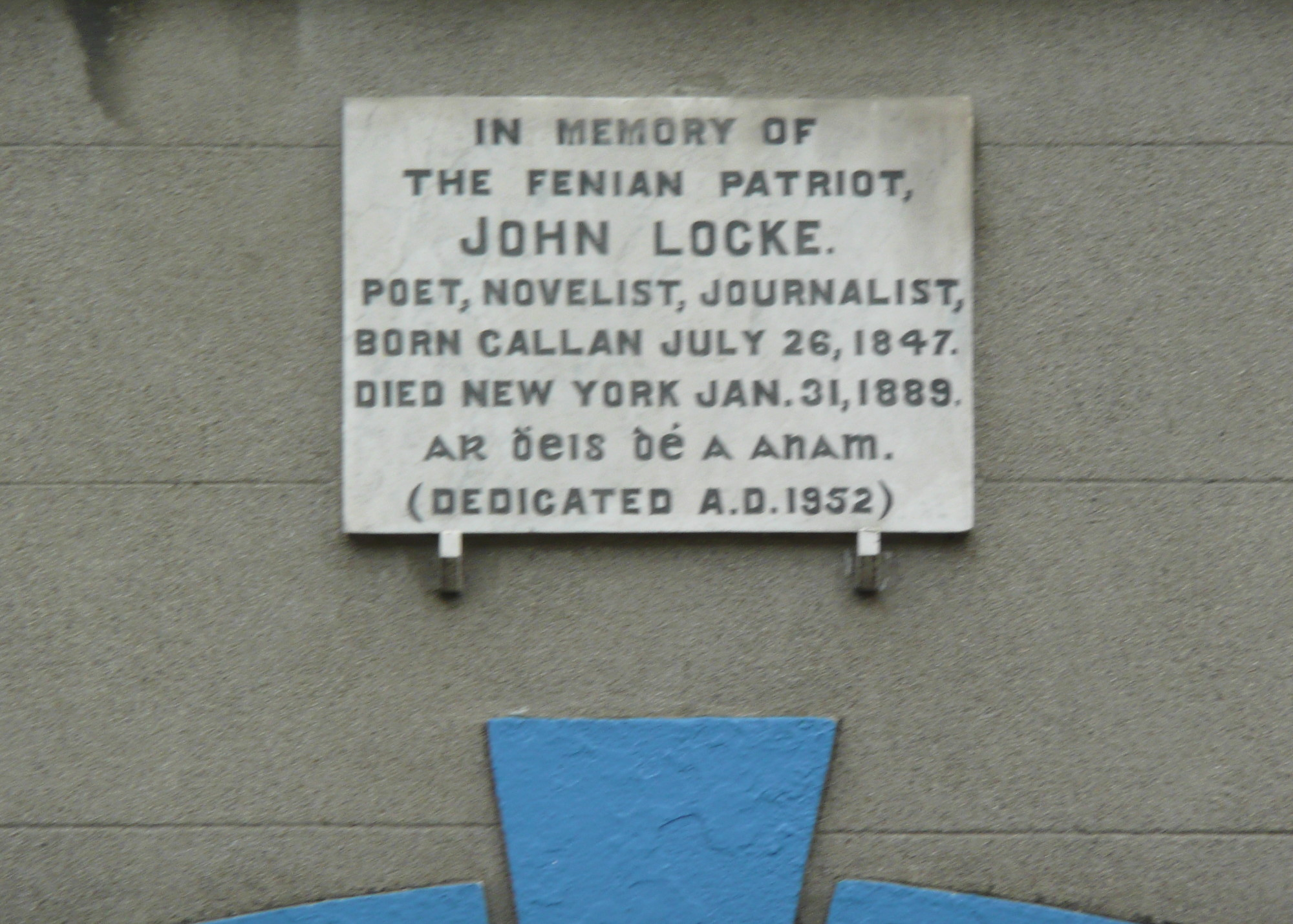
Plaque in Locke's memory in Callan; the Irish-language text is ar dheis Dé a anam, '[may] his soul [be] at [the] right [hand] of God.'

Locke was born in 1847, in the worst period of the Great Famine, in Minnauns (Irish: Na Mionnáin), east of Callan, County Kilkenny. When in school he used to write verses of poetry on slips of paper and went on to have his first of many poems published in 1863 at the age of 16 years. He is best remembered in Callan for his poem "The Calm Avonree", where a plaque on the Town Hall building is dedicated to the patriot poet. His many poems included "The Old Abbey Well", "The Burial of Sarsfield" and "Twilight on Slievenamon". However, his most famous poem was "Dawn on the Irish Coast", written in 1877 and later included in school books by the Irish Christian Brothers whose founder Edmund Rice was also born in Callan. This poem under the title of "Morning on the Irish coast" is printed in Volume 5 of Irish Literature edited by Justin McCarthy and published by John D Morris, Philadelphia. Under the title "Dawn on the Irish Coast" it is printed in Werner's Readings no. 3, published by E S Werner & Co., New York.

He had a reputation as a talented hurler in his younger years, and the local Callan hurling team, John Locke's GAA, was named in his honour when it was federated in 1902. Whilst still in his teens, he became involved with the Fenian movement writing articles and poems for the Irish People newspaper critical of British rule in Ireland. The paper was suppressed, and Locke was arrested and given a six-month term in Kilkenny jail. Upon his release, he spent some time in Manchester, where he helped organise emigrant Irish groups opposed to the Union. He then set sail for America, settling in New York and went into full-time journalism. His reputation had preceded him to America and soon became friends with a number of its finest journalist and counted among his associates, the scholar-patriot John O'Mahony. He continued to write poetry, much of it focusing on the people and places he had left behind in Ireland.

== Marriage and death ==
In 1881 John Locke married Mary Cooney – a native of Kilkenny city and herself a poet – in Villanova College in New York. This ceremony was performed by Rev. Dr. Joseph Locke, O.S.A., John's brother. They had one child. On 31 January 1889 John Locke died at 296 Henry Street in the Lower East Side, aged 41.

== Poetry ==
John Locke was a prolific writer of short stories as well as a number of full-length novels. After joining the staff of the Celtic Monthly Locke wrote what is considered his finest full-length novel, The Shamrock and Palmetto. He followed this with an historical novel Ulick Grace: A Tale of the Tithes. However, he is today best remembered for one of his poems, "Dawn on the Irish Coast"[2] also known as the "Emigrants Anthem". The poem was set to music in 1896 by A A Needham and popularised in song by Harry Plunket Greene. It was inspired by a friend's account of a brief return visit to Ireland. The aged gentleman described how he felt when the ship slowly approached the Irish coast as dawn broke.

Standing on the deck, his weary eyes beheld a vision of beauty as the emerald green of the Kerry coastline came into view. For the first time in 30 years, he looked upon his native land.

As an exile and one destined never to see Ireland again, Locke was deeply moved by the man's emotional account of his return to the Emerald Isle. The resulting poem has been quoted at parties, conferences, patriotic rallies and in thousands of pubs and hotels over the past 120 years.

When US President Ronald Reagan visited Ireland in 1984, he quoted the first verse to rousing applause.

"The Exiles Return, or Morning on the Irish coast"

D'anam chun De! but there it is—
The dawn on the hills of Ireland !
God's angels lifting the night's black veil
From the fair, sweet face of my sireland !
O, Ireland! isn't grand you look—
Like a bride in her rich adornin !
With all the pent-up love of my heart
I bid you the top of the morning !

This one short hour pays lavishly back
For many a year of mourning;
I'd almost venture another flight,
There's so much joy in returning—
Watching out for the hallowed shore,
All other attractions scornin;
O, Ireland! don't you hear me shout?
I bid you the top o' the morning!

O, kindly, generous Irish land,
So leal and fair and loving!
No wonder the wandering Celt should think
And dream of you in his roving.
The alien home may have gems and gold,
Shadows may never have gloomed it;
But the heart will sigh for the absent land
Where the love-light first illumed it

Ho, ho ! upon Cliodhna's shelving strand
The surges are grandly beating,
And Kerry is pushing her headlands out
To give us the kindly greeting!
Into the shore the sea- birds fly
On pinions that know no drooping,
And out from the cliffs, with welcomes charged,
A million of waves come trooping.

For thirty Summers, a stoir mo chroidhe,
Those hills I now feast my eyes on
Ne'er met my vision save when they rose
Over memory's dim horizon.
E'en so, 'twas grand and fair they seemed
In the landscape spread before me;
But dreams are dreams, and my eyes would open
To see a Texas' sky still o'er me.

And doesn't old Cobh look charming there
Watching the wild waves' motion,
Leaning her back up against the hills,
And the tip of her toes in the ocean.
I wonder I don't hear Shandon's bells—
Ah! maybe their chiming's over,
For it's many a year since I began
The life of a western rover.

Oh! often upon the Texas plains,
When the day and the chase were over,
My thoughts would fly o'er the weary wave,
And around this coastline hover;
And the prayer would rise that some future day-
All danger and doubting scorning—
I'd help to win for my native land
The light of young Liberty's morning!

Now fuller and truer the shoreline shows—
Was ever a scene so splendid?
I feel the breath of the Munster breeze,
Thank God that my exile's ended!
Old scenes, old songs, old friends again,
The vale and the cot I was born in—
O, Ireland, up from my heart of hearts
I bid you the top o' the mornin!
