= St. Mary's Church, Callan =

- Old Callan Church
- Cill Mhuire, Callainn
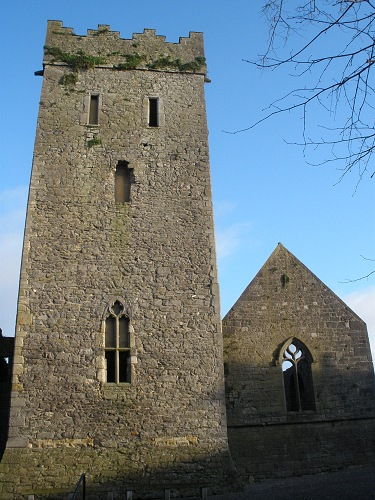

- Location within Ireland
- 52.544064°N 7.39015°W
- Location: Green Street, Callan, County Kilkenny
- Country: Ireland
- Denomination: Church of Ireland
- Previous denomination: Pre-Reformation Catholic

History
- Dedication: Mary, mother of Jesus

Architecture
- Functional status: inactive
- Style: Late Gothic
- Years built: c. 1250

Specifications
- Materials: stone

Administration
- Diocese: Ossory

National monument of Ireland
- Official name: Callan Church
- Reference no.: 455

St. Mary's Church is a medieval church and National Monument in Callan, Ireland.

== Location ==
St. Mary's is located in the centre of Callan, on the corner of Green Street and Mill Street (Augustine Street).

== History ==
St. Mary's Church was built c. 1250 by Hugh de Mapilton, Bishop of Ossory. All but the west tower was replaced c. 1460.

A carved "Trinity Stone," depicting the Trinity, is one of only a few surviving and was sculpted by Rory O'Tunny c. 1520. It was rediscovered in 1974. A chapel was added in 1530.

The chancel continued as a Church of Ireland (Anglican) place of worship until the 1970s.

== Church ==
1784 drawing

The church is a nave and chancel with north and south aisles, which have four-arch arcades. The chancel and choir are roofed, and inside the choir is a square baptismal font.

There are tomb-chests in the church but no effigies: one depicts a skeleton and another vaulting and tracery.

The north doorway depicts a carved head of a woman wearing a distinctive horned headdress of the Tudor era.
