= Kells, County Kilkenny =

Kells Irish: Ceanannas
- Village
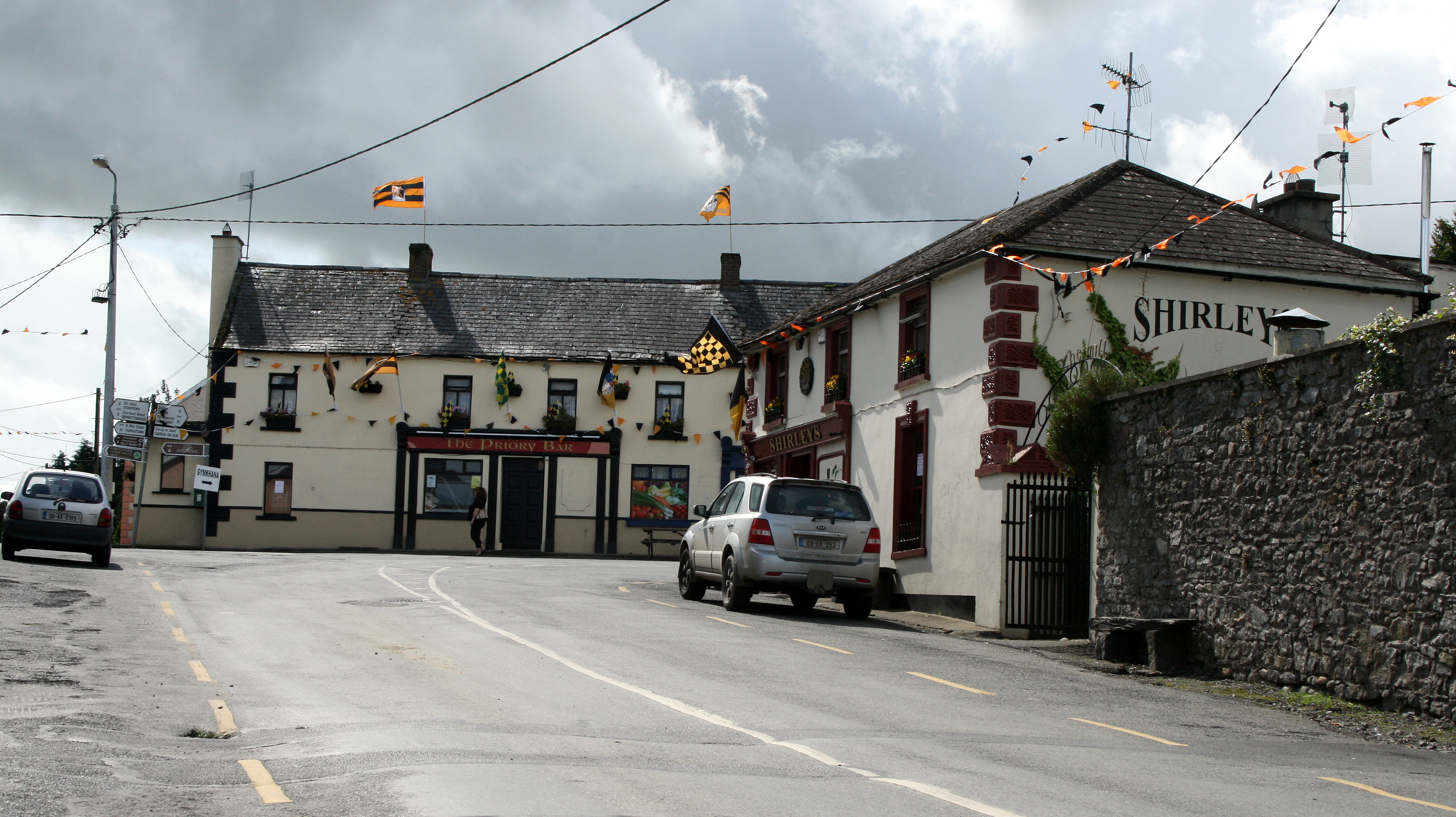
- Main St, Kells

- Location in Ireland
- Coordinates: 52°32′24″N 7°16′26″W
- Country: Ireland
- Province: Leinster
- County: Kilkenny

Population (2016)
  - Total: 274
- Time zone: UTC+0 (WET)
  - Summer (DST): UTC-1 (IST (WEST))
- Website: www.historickells.com

Kells (Irish: Ceanannas) is a village in County Kilkenny in Ireland. It is about 15 km south of Kilkenny. It is situated on high ground to the south of the Kings River. The village is in a townland and civil parish of the same name.

Kells Priory, though in ruins, is one of the best preserved in Ireland.

The Cotterell family were the leading landowners in Kells in medieval times. One member of the family, Sir John, was executed for treason in 1346. On the other hand, his cousin Walter Cotterell (who died after 1388) was a valued servant of the English Crown who frequently sat as an extra judge.

Kilree round tower and 9th century high cross, said to be the burial place of Niall Caille, is located 2 km south of Kells.

The champion racehorse Red Rum was bred at Rossenarra stud in Kells.

Olympian Michelle Smith de Bruin lives in Kells.

== Notable people ==
- Walter Cotterell (died c.1388/9), barrister and Crown official

== See also ==
- List of towns and villages in Ireland
