= St. Lachtain's Church, Freshford =

Coordinates: 52.732684°N 7.397826°W

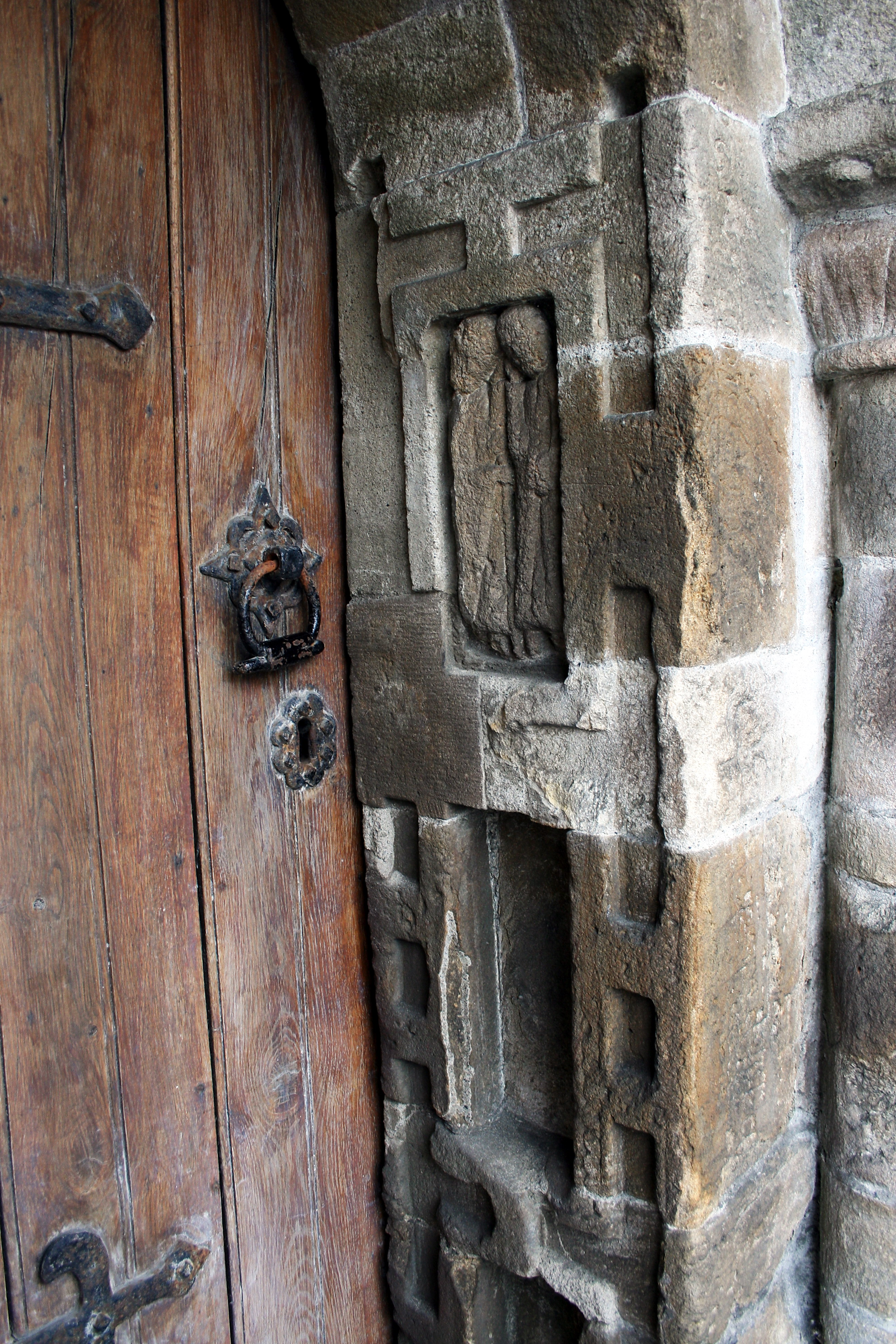
Sandstone portal built in 1100

St. Lachtain's Church was built in 1731 in the village of Freshford, County Kilkenny, Ireland. The church is named after St. Lachtain who died in Donoughmore, County Cork, in 622. It is almost certain that a church was built on the present site soon after St Lachtain's death. During the period of Viking raiding of Ireland, St Lachtain's was robbed of its gold and silver ornaments and its books were burned.

The arch bears an inscription in old Irish and translates into English as:

A prayer for Niamh, daughter of Corc, and for Mathgamhan O Chearmaic for whom this church was made. A prayer for Gille Mocholmoc O Chearmaic for whom this church was made. A prayer for Gille Mocholmoc O Ceannucain who made it.

St. Lachtain's church was rebuilt in 1100. The Hiberno-Romanesque porch and doorway being the only remaining part of the former structure.

During St. Lachtain's time, Freshford was a diocese and by 1225 a Bishop's palace for the diocese was built in nearby Uppercourt. The palace was used as a summer residence for over 300 years.

The remainder of the present church was built in 1731 for the Church of Ireland.

In the 19th century gates were placed in front of the main entrance to stop the locals from sharpening their knives on the stone doorway.

== National Monument ==
The sandstone Romanesque portal is deemed a National Monument.
