= Callan, County Kilkenny =

Town in County Killkenny, Ireland

Callan Callainn
- Town
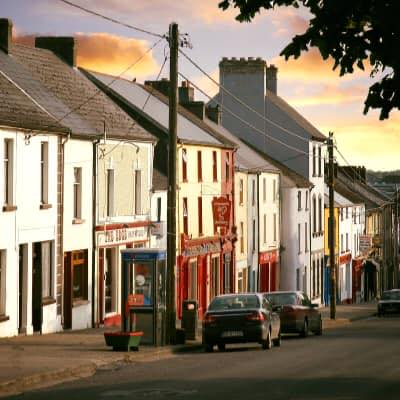
- Green Street

- Location in Ireland
- Coordinates: 52.55°N 7.383333°W
- Country: Ireland
- Province: Leinster
- County: County Kilkenny

Area
  - Total: 5 km^{2} (1.9 sq mi)
- Elevation: 65 m (213 ft)

Population (2022)
  - Total: 2,678
- Irish Grid Reference: S410440

Callan (Irish: Callainn) is a town and civil parish in County Kilkenny, Ireland. Situated about 16 km (10 mi) south of Kilkenny on the N76 road to Clonmel, it is near the border with County Tipperary. It is the second largest town in the county, with a population of 2,678 at the 2022 census. Callan is the principal settlement in the barony of the same name.

== History and name ==
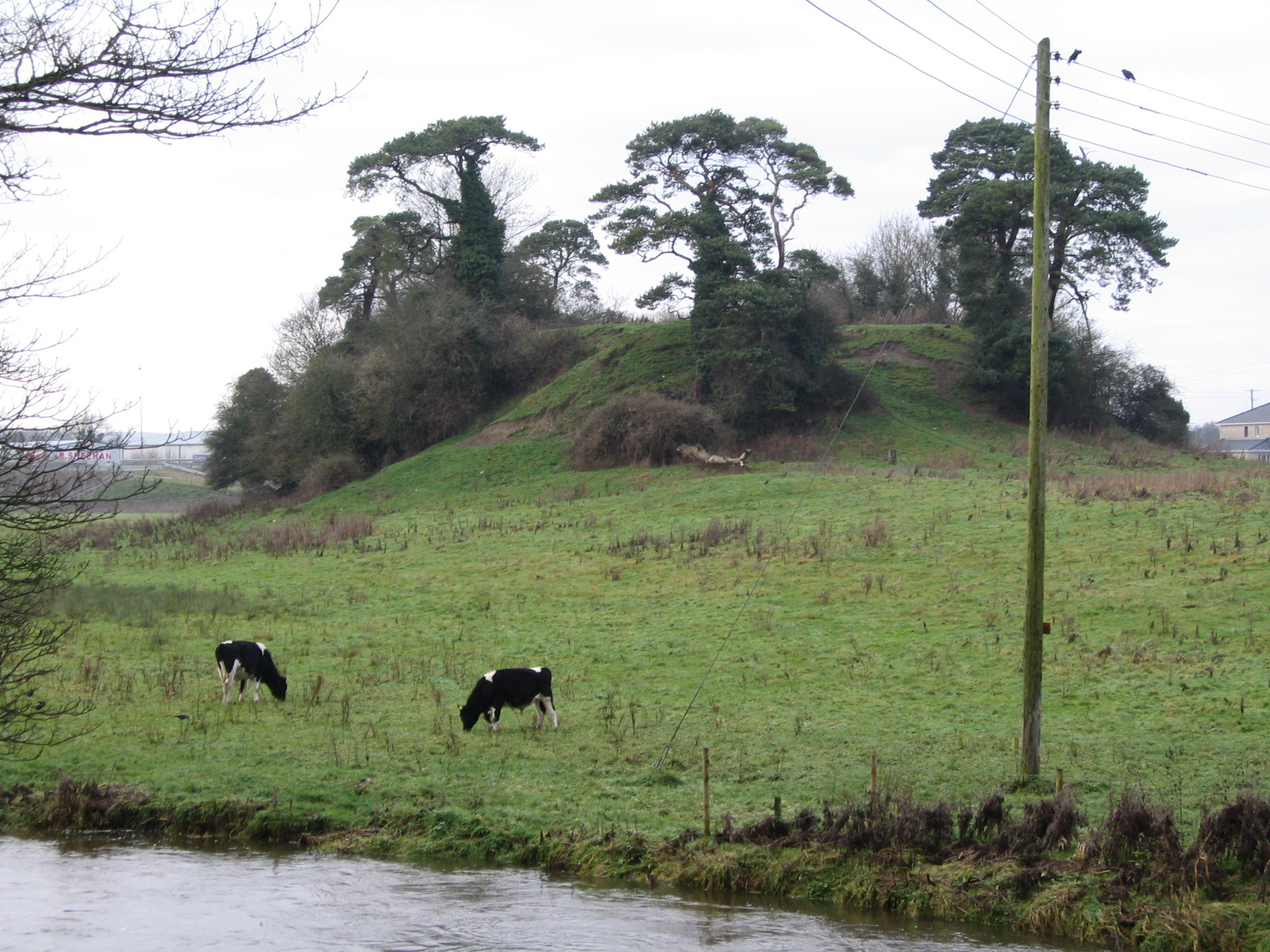
"The Moat" situated in Callan

Callan was founded by William the Marshal in 1207 and reputedly gets its name from the High King of Ireland, Niall Caille. It is reported that while at war with the Norsemen, Niall Caille arrived in Callan to find that its river was in flood. The king witnessed his servant trying to cross the river and being swept away by the fast-flowing current. According to the legend, the king, seeing the impending disaster, impetuously urged his horse into the fast-flowing river in a vain bid to save his servant, only to be also overcome and drowned by the torrent. The river in question is now named the "Kings River". The town received its first charter in 1217 and was entitled to choose two elected members of Parliament.

In 1650, Oliver Cromwell and his New Model Army laid siege to Callan. Although Sir Richard Talbot, the commander of the main defence had secretly organised to surrender, some of the other defenders refused to do so, leading to a battle for the town. All of the defenders and many of the townspeople who sought safety in the stone castle and parish church were killed. In the late 19th century, a large number of human bones and cannonballs were discovered during excavations of the ruins of the old parish church.

On 15 February 1885, the first game of Gaelic football played under unofficial rules, drawn up by the newly formed Gaelic Athletic Association, was played at the Fair Green in Callan. A local team from Callan played a Kilkenny Commercials team who travelled from Kilkenny City. 21 men lined up aside & the game finished with no score a piece.

The Fair Green was home to John Locke's GAA Club for nearly 100 years until the new facilities were developed alongside.

Historical population
Year	Pop.	±%
1841	3,111	—
1851	2,368	−23.9%
1861	2,331	−1.6%
1871	2,387	+2.4%
1881	2,340	−2.0%
1891	1,973	−15.7%
1901	1,840	−6.7%
1911	1,987	+8.0%
1926	1,500	−24.5%
1936	1,516	+1.1%
1946	1,545	+1.9%
1951	1,506	−2.5%
1956	1,461	−3.0%
1961	1,346	−7.9%
1966	1,263	−6.2%
1971	1,283	+1.6%
1981	1,431	+11.5%
1986	1,266	−11.5%
1991	1,246	−1.6%
1996	1,224	−1.8%
2002	1,325	+8.3%
2006	1,771	+33.7%
2011	2,330	+31.6%
2016	2,475	+6.2%
2022	2,678	+8.2%

In order to commemorate those who died in the Callan area during World War One, a statue was erected outside the Church of the Assumption on Green Street.

In 2007, Callan celebrated its 800th year. President Mary McAleese launched the 800th celebrations of the town being granted a charter.

== Places of interest ==
Callan Motte (also known locally as simply "The Moat") is located at the top of Moat Lane just off Bridge Street. It is one of Ireland's best-preserved Motte-and-bailey's.

Callan Augustinian Friary, known locally as the "Abbey Meadow", is at the North-East end of Callan and accessible via Bridge Street or a lane and footbridge off Mill Street. The "Abbey Meadow" also contains a holy well site.

St. Mary's Church is a medieval church located on Green Street. A historic workhouse is located in Prologue.

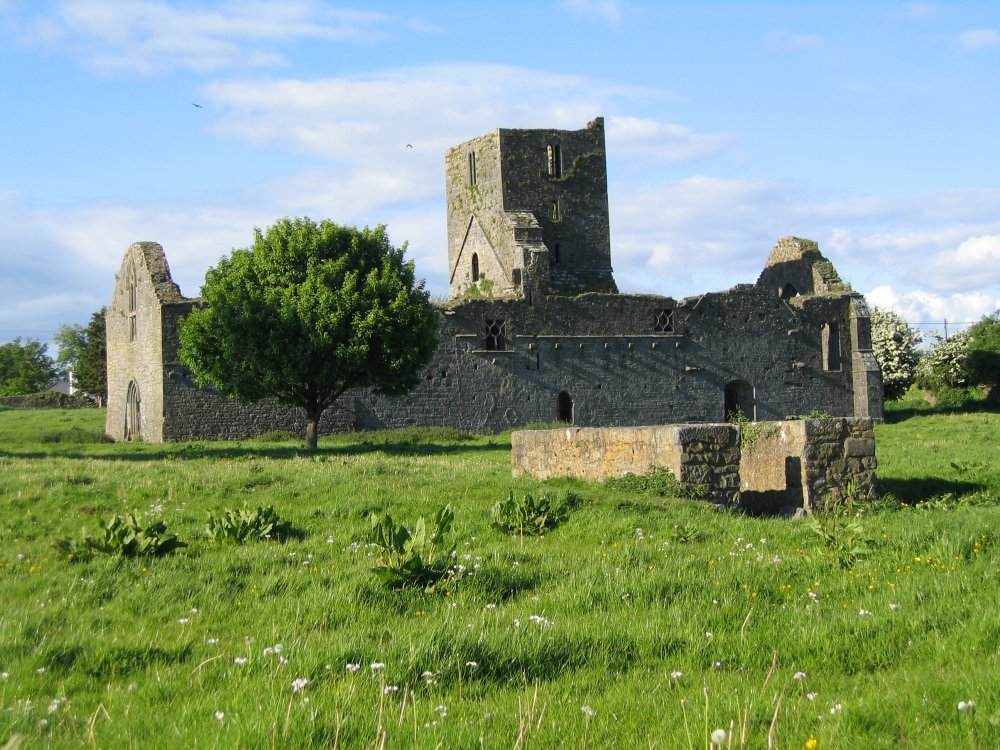
Callan Augustinian Friary

== Education ==
Callan had two primary schools, Scoil Mhuire and Scoil Iognáid Rís. The two schools amalgamated in 2007 to form Bunscoil McAuley Rice. Callan also has two secondary schools; the boys' school, Coláiste Éamann Rís, and the girls', St. Brigid's College.

== Callan local electoral area ==
The Callan–Thomastown local electoral area of County Kilkenny includes the electoral divisions of Aghaviller, Ballyhale, Ballyvool, Bennettsbridge, Boolyglass, Bramblestown, Brownsford, Burnchurch, Callan Rural, Callan Urban, Castlebanny, Coolaghmore, Coolhill, Danesfort, Dunbell, Dunnamaggan, Dysartmoon, Earlstown, Ennisnag, Famma, Freaghana, Graiguenamanagh, Grange, Inistioge, Jerpoint Church, Kells, Kilfane, Killamery, Kilmaganny, Kiltorcan, Knocktopher, Mallardstown, Outrath, Pleberstown, Powerstown, Rosbercon Rural, Scotsborough, Stonyford, The Rower, Thomastown, Tullaghanbrogue, Tullaherin, Tullahought, Ullard and Woolengrange.

== In popular culture ==
Neil Jordan's film Breakfast on Pluto, with Cillian Murphy and Liam Neeson, was filmed in Callan during August–September 2005. During the two weeks of filming in Callan, the main streets of the town were transformed for use in the film.

Callan was the set and stage for The Big Chapel X, a large-scale theatre production and community engagement project that drew on the history of the Callan schism, in August 2019, created by Asylum Productions in partnership with the Kilkenny Arts Festival supported by the Abbey Theatre and the Arts Council.

Callan was the fictional birthplace of the Walter O'Brien character in the CBS TV show, Scorpion.

The area is home to a number of arts organisations including KCAT Arts Centre, Workhouse Union, Monkeyshine, Trasna Productions and Fennelly's Cafe.

== People ==
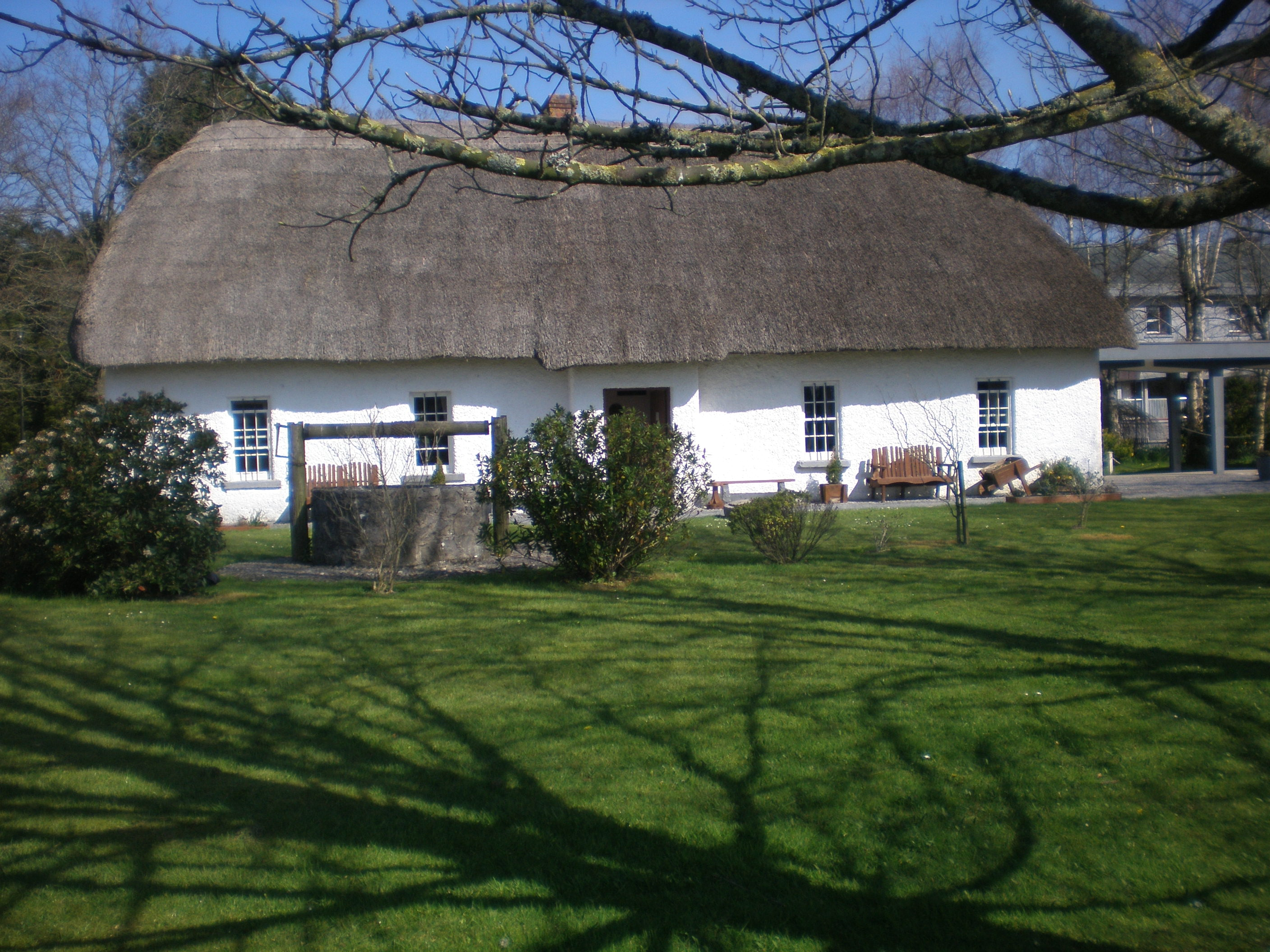
Edmund Rice's childhood home at Callan

Callan is the birthplace of a number of notable people, including:

- Edmund or Edward Butler (died 1584), a member of the Butler dynasty, Attorney General for Ireland and a justice of the Court of King's Bench (Ireland), lived in Callan for most of his life.
- Gerald Comerford (died 1604), the principal landowner in Callan in the late sixteenth century and also an influential politician and judge; his tomb can still be seen at St Mary's Church
- Patrick Cudahy (1849–1919), American industrialist and philanthropist
- James Hoban who designed The White House and Leinster House among others was born in Desart, near Callan.
- Linda Hogan (born 1964), Professor of Ecumenics at Trinity College Dublin, and its former vice-provost
- Edmund Ignatius Rice, founder of the Irish Christian Brothers and the Presentation Brothers
- Thomas Kilroy Irish playwright and novelist. Author of the historical novel The Big Chapel.
- John Locke, Ireland's "poet in exile", was born here in 1847.
- Seamus Moore (singer), Irish singer/songwriter
- Thomas Nash (Newfoundland) Irish fisherman, settled in Newfoundland and Labrador, Canada. Founder of Branch, Newfoundland and Labrador
- Tony O'Malley, Irish painter
- Amhlaoibh Ó Súilleabháin (1780–1838), was a schoolmaster and linen-draper in the town, and kept a diary in the Irish language between 1827 and 1835.

== See also ==
- John Locke's GAA
- List of abbeys and priories in Ireland (County Kilkenny)
- List of towns and villages in Ireland
- Market Houses in Ireland
