= King's River, County Kilkenny, Ireland =

River in southeastern Ireland, tributary of the Nore

King's River
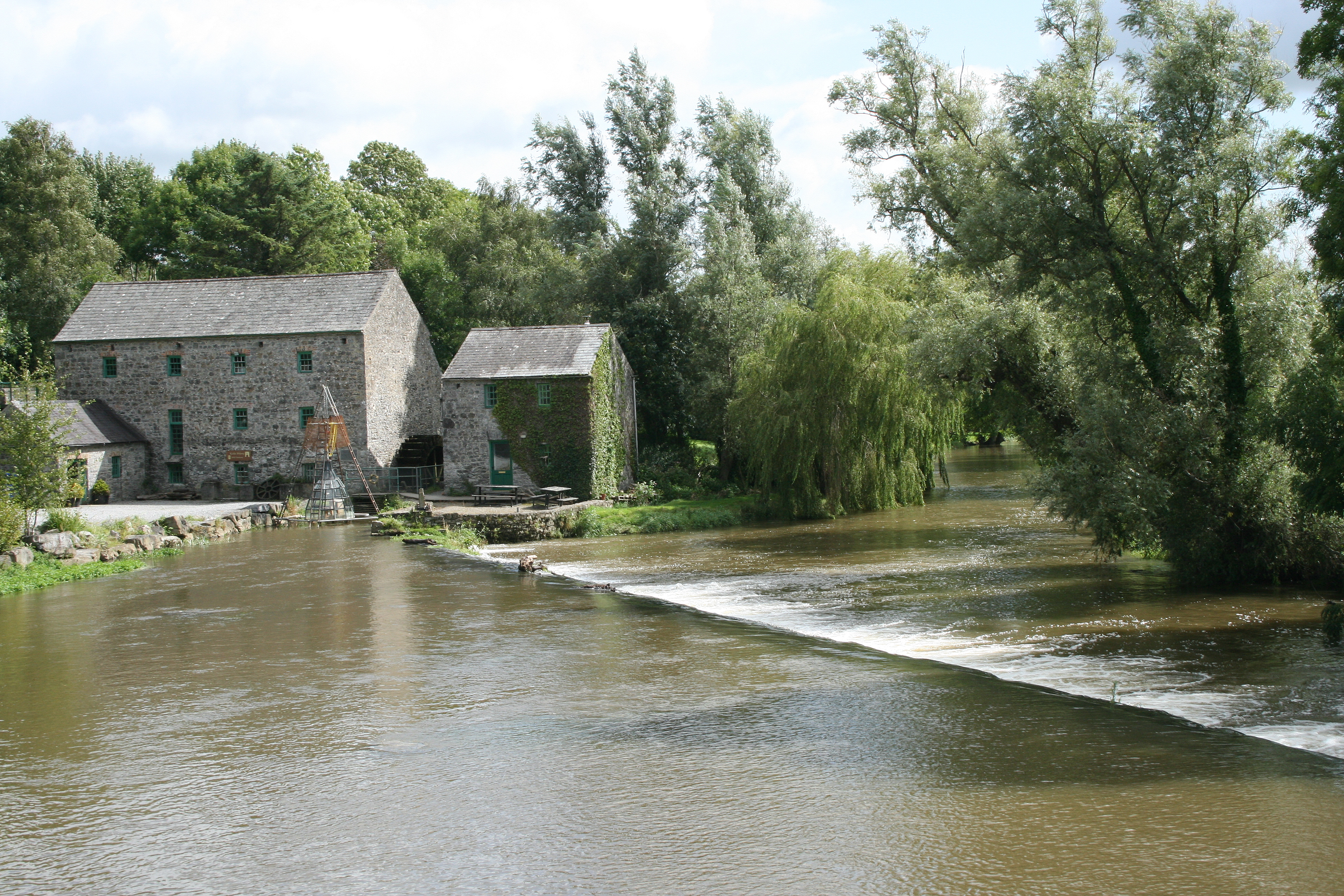
- Kings River at Kells

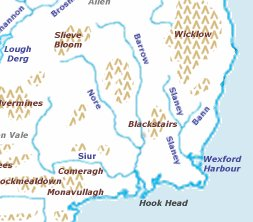
- Map showing the location of the Three Sisters rivers.

- Location of the mouth in Ireland.
- Native name: Abhainn Rí (Irish)

Location
- County: Ireland
- Counties: Tipperary/Kilkenny

Physical characteristics
- Source
  - location: Slieveardagh Hills
  - coordinates: 52.5894521°N 7.5587721°W
- Mouth: River Nore
  - location: Celtic Sea, as the River Nore
  - coordinates: 52.5624522°N 7.192368°W
  - elevation: 0 m (0 ft)
- Length: 46.27 kilometres (28.75 mi)

Basin features
- Progression: River Nore—Celtic Sea
- River system: River Nore/ Three Sisters

The King's River (Irish: Abhainn Rí) is a river in Ireland that flows through the counties of Tipperary and Kilkenny. It is part of the Nore catchment area and is a tributary of the River Nore.

== Course ==
=== Overview ===
From the townland of Graigaman, in the civil parish of Buolick in the barony of Slievardagh, the King's River drains the southern side of the Slieveardagh Hills. Flowing southeast, it crosses into County Kilkenny where it is joined by the Munster River. It then passes through the town of Callan. Continuing eastwards, it passes Kells. To the west of Thomastown, it finally joins the River Nore.

=== Detail and tributaries ===
The King's River begins with the Coalbrook and Garranacoll streams. It carries on for over 70 kilometres (43 mi) where it is joined by the River Modeshil and River Munster over the next 60 kilometres (37 mi). The River Kilbride also joins after Callan. The next 40 kilometres (25 mi) sees the tributaries of Caherlesk and Desart streams, as well as the River Glory and the Stonyford stream. The King's River is then joined by the Ennisnag stream before flowing into the Nore.

Additional tributaries include one that starts as a spring in the townland of Ballyphilip, Balingarry Civil Parish, joining the river above Wilford, one above Enterprise Centre, near Ballingarry, and one at Rivergrove, Kilkenny.

== Governance ==
The responsible local authorities are Tipperary County Council and Kilkenny County Council.

== See also ==
- Rivers of Ireland
