= Grangefertagh =

- Gráinseach na Fearta; Fearta-Caerach
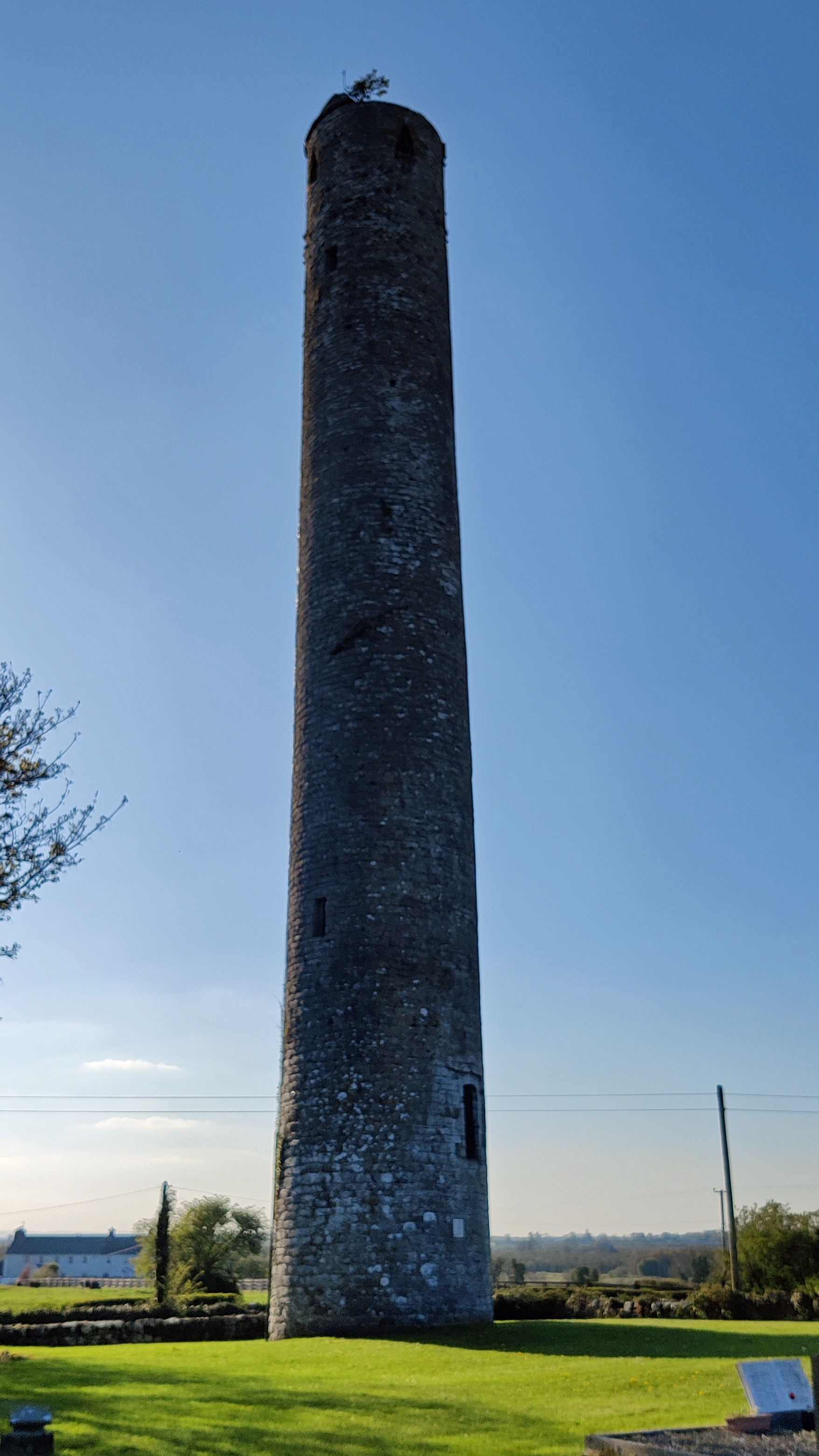
- Round tower

- Location within Ireland
- Interactive map of Grangefertagh

Monastery information
- Other name: Fertagh
- Order: Canons Regular of Saint Augustine
- Established: early 6th century
- Disestablished: 1536
- Diocese: Ossory

People
- Founder: Ciarán of Saigir

Architecture
- Functional status: In ruins
- Style: Celtic monastic

Site
- Location: Grangefertagh, Johnstown, County Kilkenny, Ireland
- Coordinates: 52.778459°N 7.544599°W
- Public access: yes

Grangefertagh is a former abbey located in County Kilkenny, Ireland. It is today a National Monument.

== Location ==
Grangefertagh is located about 3.3 km (2.1 mi) north of Johnstown, County Kilkenny, near a crossing-point on the River Goul.

== History ==
Grangefertagh was founded in the sixth century AD by Saint Ciarán of Saigir, and known as Fearta-Cáerach ("Sheep's Tomb"). In 861 Cerball mac Dúnlainge killed a host of Vikings at Fertagh, taking forty heads. A round tower was later built. In 1156 the high king Muirchertach Mac Lochlainn burned the tower with the lector inside.

The monastery was reopened by the de Blancheville family for the Canons Regular of St Augustine in the early 13th century. In 1421 it was so destroyed and desolated that its religious could not 'remain therein, but must wander about and beg their daily bread' but in 1455 it was rebuilt by Thady Megirid/Magriyd, a canon of Inchmacnerin. The monastery was dissolved in 1541 but the church was in use until 1780 and now forms part of a Gaelic handball alley.

== Buildings ==
=== Round tower ===
The tower is 31 m (102 ft) tall. It has nine windows: six angle-headed and three lintelled. Four of the angle-headed windows are on the top storey facing the four cardinal directions. The tower is complete to the cornice but only part of the cap remains.

The doorway faces northeast and is 3.3 m (11 ft) above the ground. Sometime before 1800, a local farmer removed some stones from the original doorcase because he believed that they had magical fire-resistant properties. The doorway as it appears now is a later repair job.

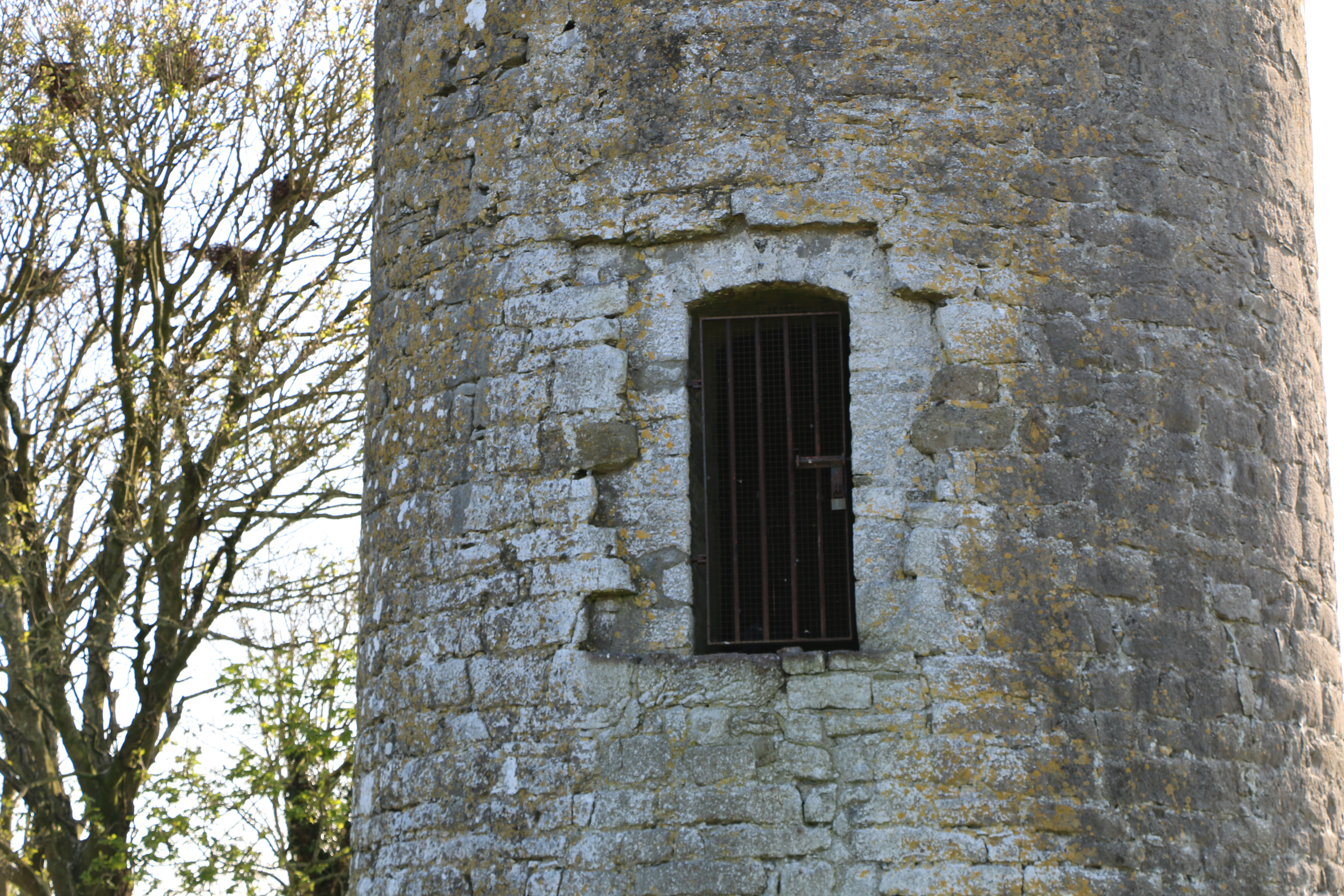

=== Church ===
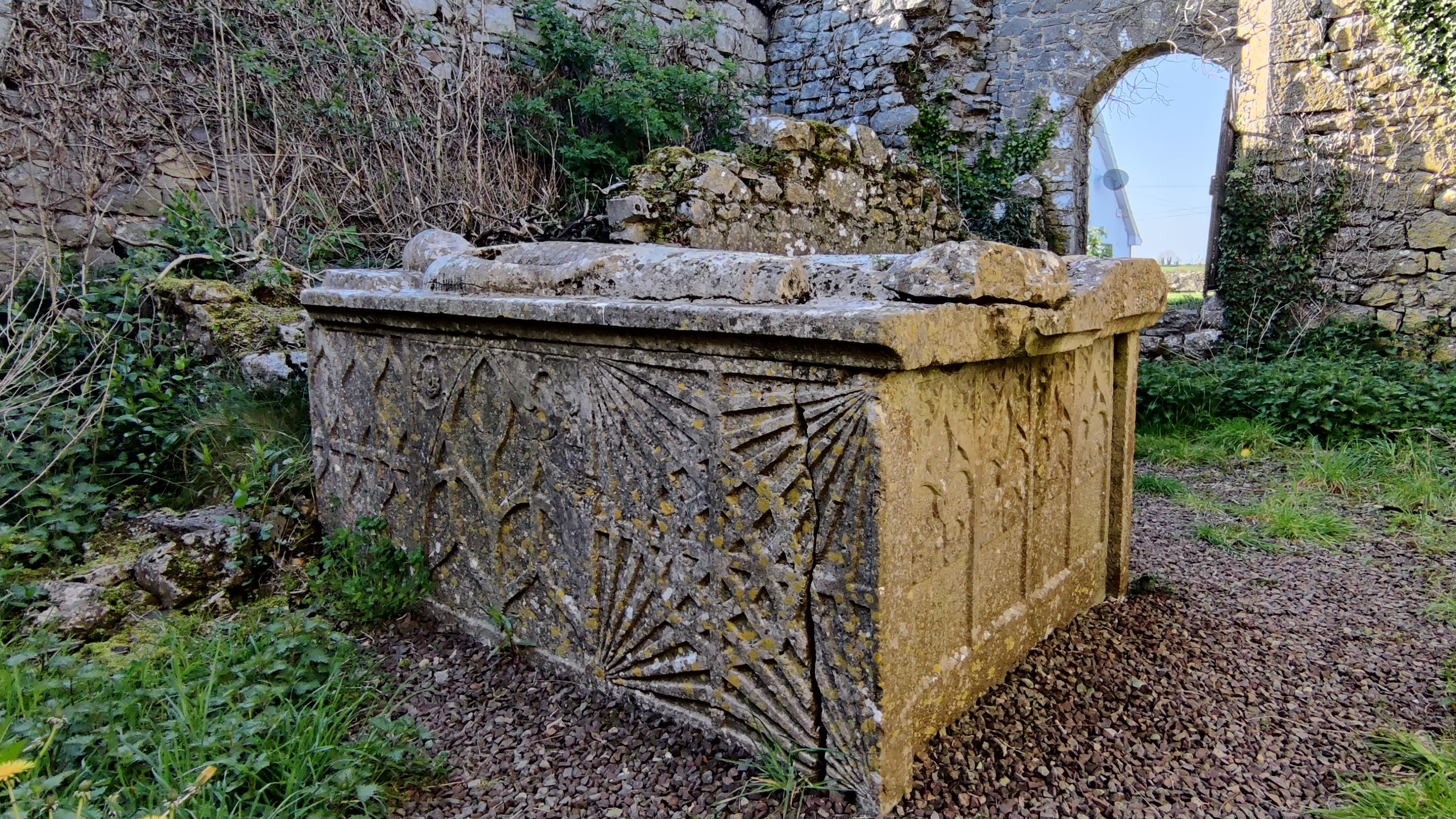

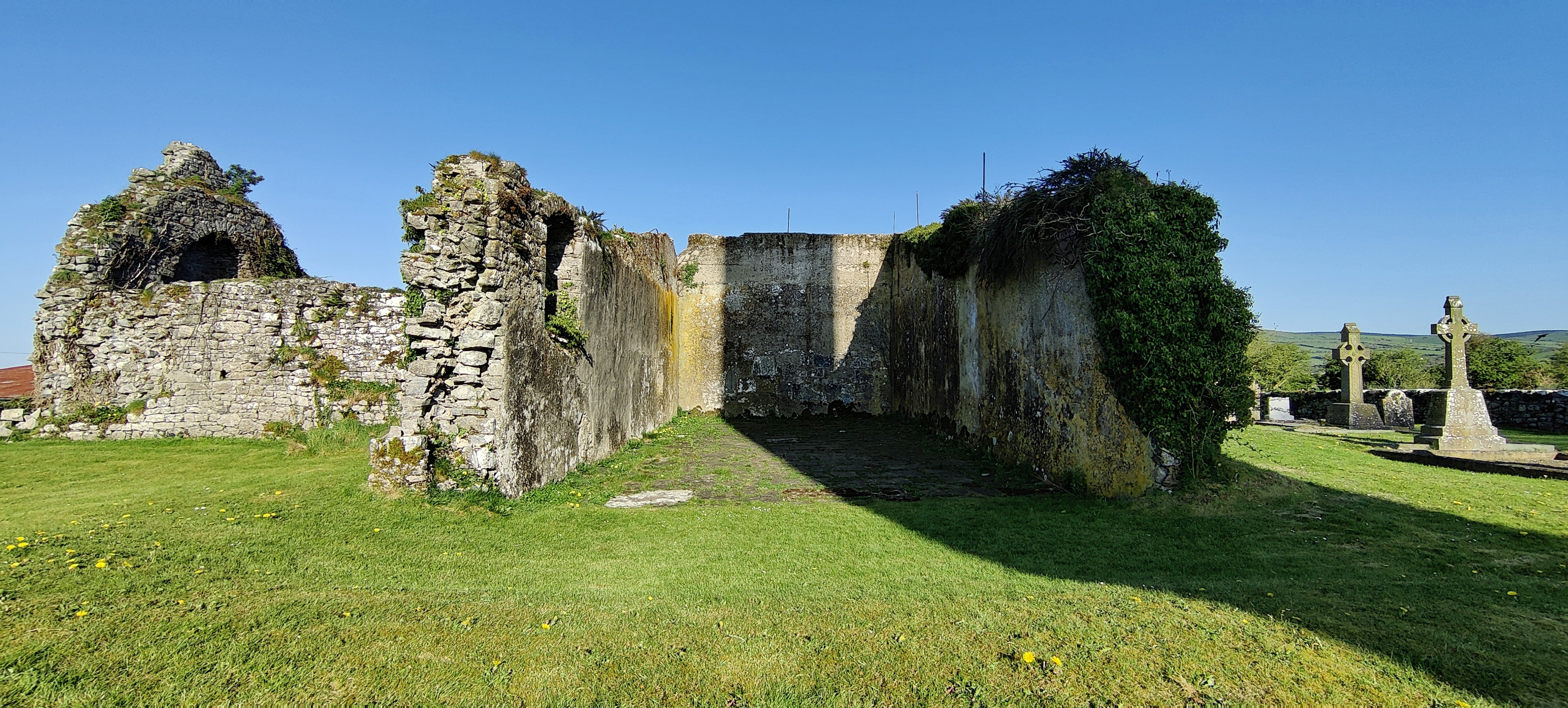

There is an Augustinian monastery church (13th century) west of the tower. A side chapel contains a 16th century tomb said by Carrigan to be that of Seán Mac Giolla Phádraig, King of Osraige. The tomb has effigies of a man in armour and a woman, said to be Seán’s wife Nóirín Ní Mórdha. Carrigan claimed other members of the Mac Giolla Phádraig dynasty also rest there. The chest is decorated with tracery and lierne vaulting in relief. A 2020 article reviews various unusual aspects of the tomb that scholars, including Carrigan, have found make it an exception compared with other similar tombs built by Ormond sculptors.
