= Kells Priory =

Ruined Augustinitan monastery in County Kilkenny, Ireland

- Prióireacht Cheanannais
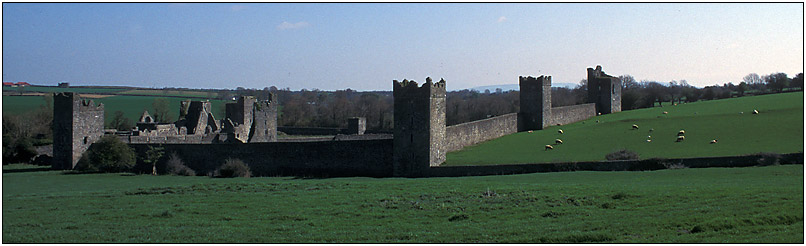
- Kells Priory

- Location within Ireland

Monastery information
- Order: Augustinians
- Established: 1193
- Disestablished: 1540

People
- Founder: Geoffrey FitzRobert

Architecture
- Heritage designation: National Monument

Site
- Location: Kells, County Kilkenny, Ireland
- Coordinates: 52°32′18″N 7°16′01″W
- Public access: Yes

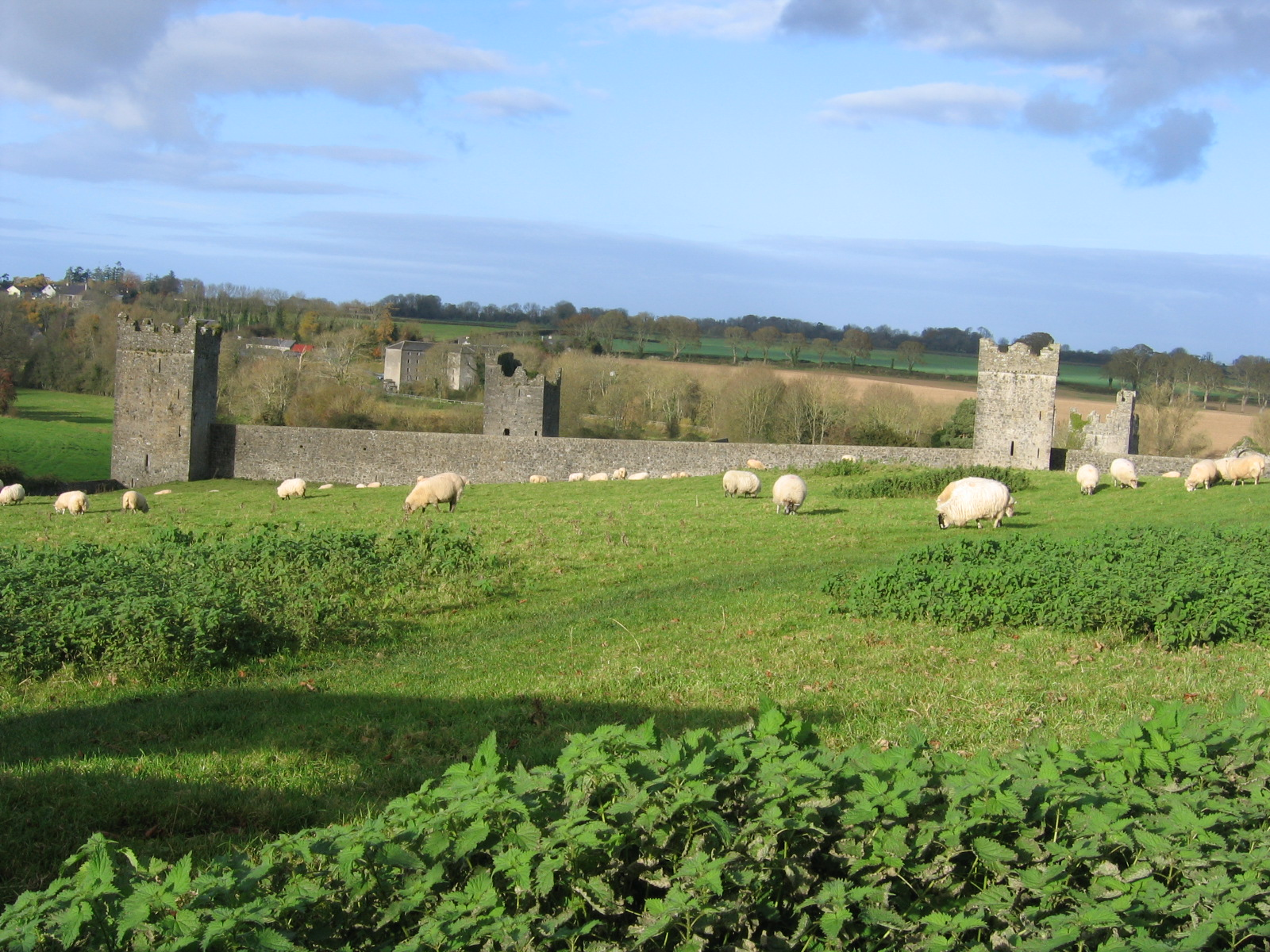
Kells Priory

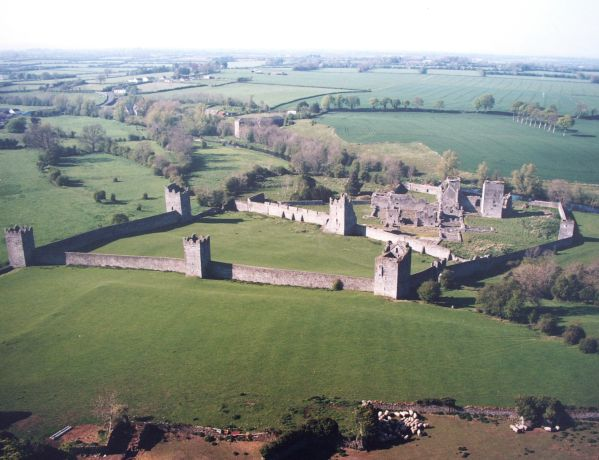
Kells Priory from above

Kells Priory (Irish: Prióireacht Cheanannais) is one of the largest medieval monuments in Ireland. The Augustine priory is situated alongside King's River beside the village of Kells in the townland of Rathduff (Madden), about 15 km south of the medieval city of Kilkenny. The priory is a National Monument and is in the guardianship of the Office of Public Works. One of its most notable features is a collection of medieval tower houses spaced at intervals along and within walls which enclose a site of just over 3 acres (12,000 m^{2}). These give the priory the appearance more of a medieval fortress than of a place of worship and from them comes its local name of "Seven Castles".

4 km southeast of the priory on the R697 regional road is Kilree round tower and 9th century High Cross, said to be the burial place of Niall Caille. It was used in the film Barry Lyndon as the location for the English Redcoat encampment.

Kells Priory was founded by Geoffrey FitzRobert most probably in 1193. FitzRobert was brother-in-law to Strongbow and the priory succeeded an earlier church that was dedicated to St. Mary, the Blessed Virgin and served as the parish church to nearby Kells village.

During its first century and a half, the priory was attacked and burned on three occasions, first by Lord William de Bermingham in 1252, by the Scots army of Edward Bruce on Palm Sunday 1316, and by a second William de Bermingham in 1327.

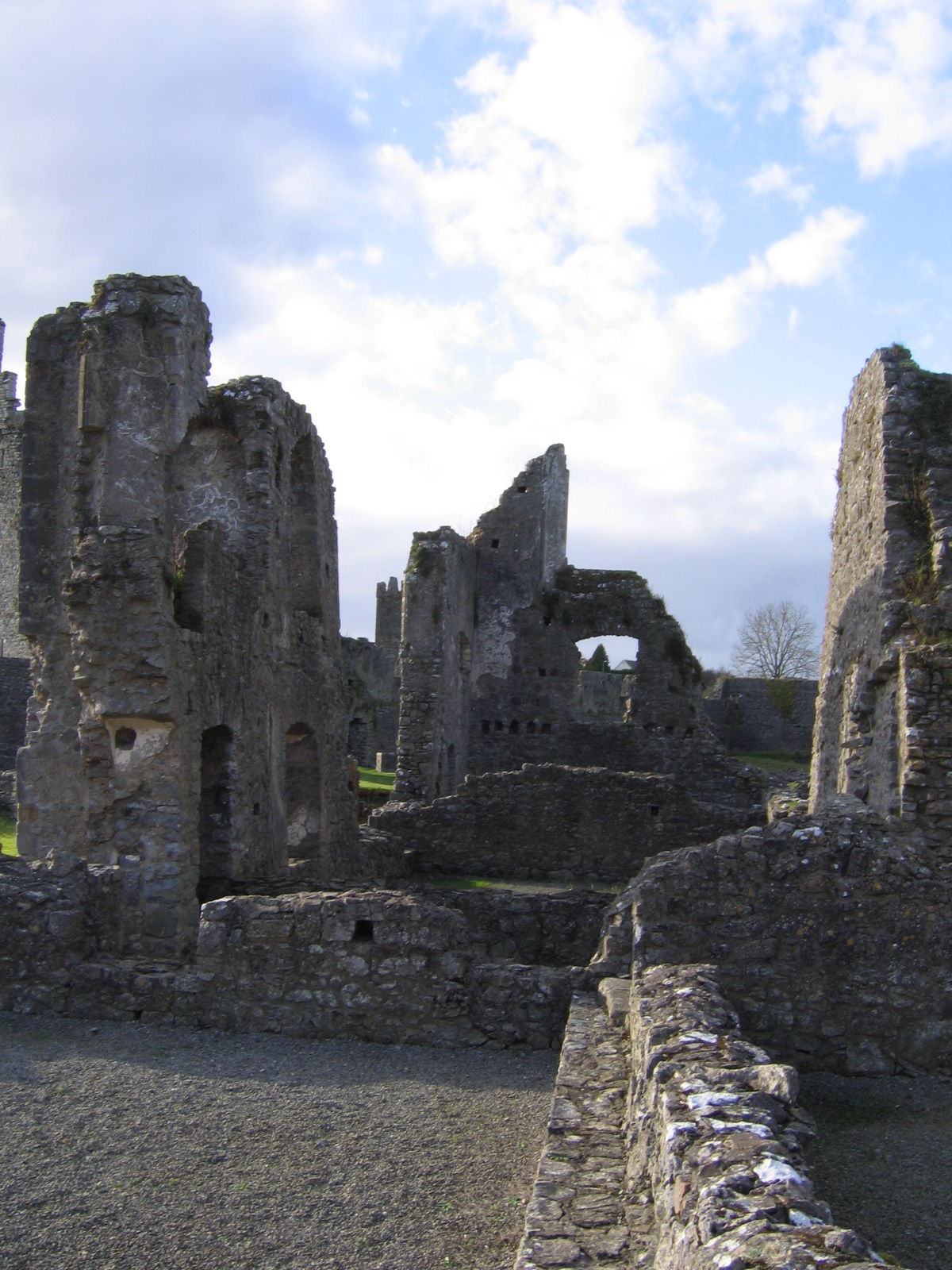
Interior walls

In 1324 the Bishop of Ossory, Richard de Ledrede, paid a lenten visit to the priory. Following an inquisition into a Kilkenny sect of heretics, Alice Kyteler and William Outlawe were ordered to appear before the Bishop to answer charges of witchcraft. Outlawe was supported by Arnold de Poer, Lord of Kells who arrested the Bishop and had him imprisoned in Kilkenny Castle for 17 days. This caused great scandal and on his release, the Bishop successfully prosecuted the heretics. Alice Kyteler fled to England and remained there, Alice Smith also fled, but her maidservant Petronilla de Meath became Ireland's first heretic to be burned at the stake.

Dissolution of Kells Priory finally took place in March 1540 and the church and property were surrendered to James Butler, 9th Earl of Ormonde.

== Layout ==
The priory is divided into two parts, an inner monastic precinct alongside the river and a large outer enclosure to the south. The latter was built in the fifteenth century and was referred to as Villa Prioris or villa and might have served as a safe place for people and their animal residing in the neighbouring houses. Actual function of the villa remains uncertain.

Beside the second wall, closer to the river, was the primary church. It was built in the early XIII century and had a nave stretching about 25 meters and with a chancel and crossing spanning about 40 meters.

Various utility buildings for the canons surrounded the church and were first built with wood and later with stone, with some claustral ranges possibly being finished before the main church.

== Excavations ==
Tom Fanning, a state archaeologist and subsequently senior archaeology lecturer in NUI Galway began an excavation of the site in 1972. His work was completed by Miriam Clyne after Fanning's death in 1993. The excavation is one of the largest ever undertaken in Ireland at a monastic house and the publication by Clyne (2007), Kells Priory, Co. Kilkenny: archaeological excavations by T. Fanning & M. Clyne, is one of the largest ever published on a rural medieval site.

There were approximately 20,000 archaeological finds which range from pieces of carved stone, pottery including Ham Green, floor and ridge tiles, metal objects as well as a collection of painted window glass which has allowed the reconstruction of what some of the window patterns may have looked like.

== Burials ==
- Patrick Barrett

== See also ==
- Kilree – nearby abbey
- List of abbeys and priories in Ireland (County Kilkenny)
