= List of national monuments in Leinster =

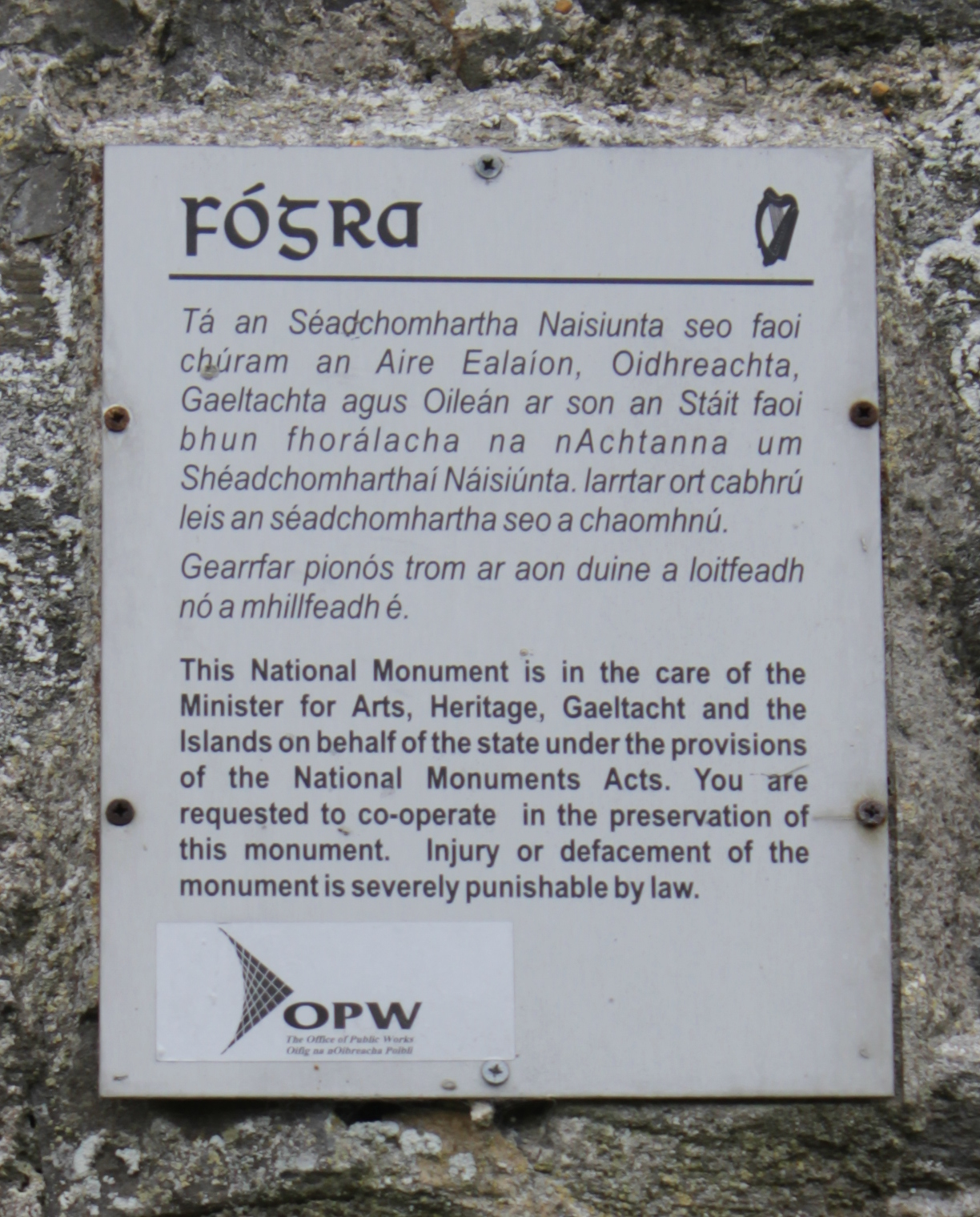
Photo of a typical notice at a national monument in Ireland.

The Irish state has officially approved the following list of national monuments of Ireland. In Ireland, a structure or site may be deemed to be a "national monument", and therefore worthy of state protection, if it is of national importance. If the land adjoining the monument is essential to protect it, this land may also be protected.

== National Monuments in Leinster ==
Carlow - Dublin - Kildare - Kilkenny - Laois - Longford - Louth - Meath - Offaly - Westmeath - Wexford - Wicklow

This list is initially sorted by county. If the list is sorted under another heading, the county links above will take you to the first item from the county in the sorted list

NM#	Monument name	Description	Image	Townland	County	Location
347	Aghade Holed Stone (Cloghaphoill)	Holed Stone		Aghade	52°46′12″N 6°44′48″W	
351	Ballyloughan Castle	Castle		Ballyloughan	52°40′23″N 6°53′53″W	
486	Ballymoon Castle	Castle		Ballymoon	52°42′00″N 6°54′25″W	
566	Baunogenasraid	Burial Mound (Cist)		Baunogenasraid	52°48′45″N 6°49′25″W	
306	Carlow Castle	Castle		Carlow	52°50′11″N 6°56′09″W	
545	Castlemore Moat	Motte and Bailey & Cross Slab		Castlemore	52°48′34″N 6°46′21″W	
613	Browneshill	Portal Tomb		Kernanstown	52°50′14″N 6°52′52″W	
393	Killoughternane Church	Church		Killoughternane	52°38′02″N 6°51′13″W	
603	Rathvilly Moat	Burial Mound or Motte		Knockroe	52°52′50″N 6°40′42″W	
438	Leighlinbridge Castle	Castle		Leighlinbridge	52°44′09″N 6°58′41″W	
350	Lorum High Cross	Cross Fragment		Lorum	52°39′51″N 6°55′56″W	
352	Nurney Cross	Cross		Nurney	52°45′06″N 6°54′44″W	
3	St. Mullin's	Early Medieval Ecclesiastical Site		St Mullin's	52°29′20″N 6°55′42″W	
452	Straboe Grave Slab	Medieval Grave Slab		Straboe	52°51′41″N 6°46′19″W	
310	Baldongan Church	Church & Tower		Baldongan	53°33′11″N 6°07′44″W	
437	Ballyedmonduff Wedge Tomb	Wedge Tomb		Ballyedmonduff	53°13′45″N 6°13′34″W	
590	Balrothery Tower	Church Tower		Balrothery	53°35′12″N 6°11′24″W	
291	Brennanstown Portal Tomb	Portal Tomb		Brennanstown	53°15′14″N 6°09′32″W	
32	Clondalkin Round Tower	Round Tower & Cross		Clondalkin	53°19′19″N 6°23′43″W	
285	Tully's Castle	Castle		Clondalkin	53°19′15″N 6°23′24″W	
444	Archbold's Castle	Castle		Dalkey	53°16′40″N 6°06′23″W	
33	Dalkey Island Church	Church		Dalkey Island	53°16′22″N 6°05′08″W	
401	St. Mary's Abbey	Abbey (Cistercian) (Chapter house)		Northside Dublin	53°20′51″N 6°16′09″W	
34	St. Audoen's Church	Church		Southside Dublin	53°20′37″N 6°16′27″W	
	St. Stephen's Green	Park		Southside Dublin	53°20′17″N 6°15′33″W	
230	Dunsoghly Castle	Castle		Dunsoghly	53°25′37″N 6°19′06″W	
276	Glencullen Standing Stone	Standing Stone		Glencullen	53°13′11″N 6°13′03″W	
605	Grange Abbey	Church		Donaghmede	53°23′57″N 6°09′38″W	
36	Howth Church	Church		Howth	53°23′15″N 6°03′57″W	
226	Kilgobbin Cross	Cross		Kilgobbin	53°15′23″N 6°13′04″W	
207, 587	Kill of the Grange	Church, Well & Bullaun Stone		Kill of the Grange	53°16′53″N 6°09′40″W	
35	Cill Iníon Léinín	Church		Killiney	53°15′17″N 6°06′59″W	
675	Kilmainham Gaol	Prison		Kilmainham	53°20′31″N 6°18′35″W	
493	Kilmashogue	Wedge Tomb		Rathfarnham	53°15′28″N 6°16′32″W	
343	Kiltiernan Tomb	Portal Tomb		Kiltiernan	53°14′20″N 6°12′26″W	
216	Laughanstown	Crosses and wedge tomb		Laughanstown	53°14′32″N 6°09′06″W	
225	Tully Church	Church		Laughanstown	53°14′49″N 6°09′08″W	
157	Lusk	Round Tower & Church Tower		Lusk	53°31′34″N 6°10′02″W	
302	Casino at Marino	Demesne Building		Marino	53°22′16″N 6°13′37″W	
494	Monkstown Castle	Castle		Monkstown	53°17′20″N 6°09′02″W	
628	Rathfarnham Castle	Castle or Fortified House		Rathfarnham	53°17′53″N 6°17′01″W	
162	Rathmichael	Early Medieval Ecclesiastical Site		Rathmichael	53°13′58″N 6°08′46″W	
340	Swords Castle	Castle		Swords	53°27′35″N 6°13′12″W	
464	Tibradden	Cairn		Rathfarnham	53°14′19″N 6°16′49″W	
681	Conolly's Folly	Folly/Obelisk		Barrogstown West	53°22′10″N 6°33′36″W	
471	Castledermot Round Tower	Round Tower & Crosses		Castledermot	52°54′38″N 6°50′06″W	
200	Castledermot Abbey	Friary (Franciscan)		Castledermot	52°54′31″N 6°50′14″W	
394	Furness Church	Church		Forenaghts Great	53°13′25″N 6°36′09″W	
629	Grange Castle	Castle		Grange West	53°22′30″N 7°04′05″W	
528	Jigginstown House	House - 16th/17th Century		Jigginstown	53°12′50″N 6°40′57″W	
275	Kilteel Castle	Castle & Cross		Kilteel Upper	53°13′57″N 6°31′39″W	
485	Maynooth Castle	Castle		Maynooth	53°22′51″N 6°35′40″W	
674	Moone High Cross	High Cross		Moone	52°58′46″N 6°49′31″W	
589	Mullaghreelan Rath	Ringfort		Mullaghreelan	52°56′09″N 6°52′24″W	
71	Old Kilcullen	Church, Round Tower & Crosses		Old Kilcullen	53°06′28″N 6°45′39″W	
190	Oughter Ard Tower	Round Tower & Church		Oughter Ard	53°16′40″N 6°33′57″W	
305	Punchestown Longstone	Standing Stone		Punchestown Great	53°11′31″N 6°37′42″W	
404	Rathcoffey Castle	Castle gatehouse		Rathcoffey Demesne	53°19′53″N 6°39′53″W	
503	St John's Tower	Tower, formerly part of hospital		Skenagun	52°54′50″N 6°50′16″W	
70, 578	Taghadoe	Round Tower and Church		Taghadoe	53°21′12″N 6°36′48″W	
334	Aghaviller	Church & Round Tower		Aghaviller	52°27′55″N 7°16′05″W	
599	Ballyboodan Ogham Stone	Ogham Stone (AD 700-900)		Ballyboodan	52°28′12″N 7°13′22″W	
282	Ballylarkin Church	Church		Ballylarkin Upper	52°43′22″N 7°25′39″W	
475	Callan Augustinian Friary	Friary (Augustinians)		Callan North	52°32′45″N 7°23′14″W	
455	Callan Church (St. Mary's)	Church		Callan South	52°32′39″N 7°23′25″W	
79	Kilkieran High Crosses	High Crosses		Castletown (Iverk barony)	52°23′52″N 7°22′51″W	
274	Clara Castle	Castle		Clara Upper	52°40′10″N 7°09′08″W	
77	Clonamery Church	Church		Clonamery	52°28′01″N 7°01′54″W	
646	Coolhill Castle	Donjon		Coolhill	52°27′54″N 6°55′56″W	
321	Burnchurch Castle	Castle & Tower		Farmley	52°34′34″N 7°17′51″W	
522	Magdalan Castle	Castle		Gardens; Kilkenny City	52°39′10″N 7°14′41″W	
331, 344	St. John's Abbey, Kilkenny	Priory (Augustinian) (part of & chancel)		Gardens; Kilkenny City	52°39′13″N 7°14′54″W	
626	Kells Castle	Motte & Bailey		Garrynamann Lower; Kells, County Kilkenny	52°32′18″N 7°16′01″W	
214	St. Mary's Collegiate Church Gowran	Collegiate Church		Gowran	52°37′45″N 7°03′48″W	
620	Graiguenamanagh Abbey	Abbey (Cistercians)		Graiguenamanagh	52°32′27″N 6°57′16″W	
74	Grangefertagh	Round Tower & Church		Grangefertagh	52°46′42″N 7°32′41″W	
80	Jerpoint Abbey	Abbey (Cistercian)		Jerpointabbey	52°30′39″N 7°09′28″W	
300	Kilfane Church	Church		Kilfane Demesne	52°33′15″N 7°07′06″W	
75	Killamery High Cross	High Cross		Killamery	52°28′31″N 7°26′45″W	
324	Kilmogue Portal Tomb	Portal Tomb		Kilmogue, Harristown	52°24′11″N 7°15′45″W	
76	Kilree	Church, Round Tower & Cross		Kilree	52°31′05″N 7°16′07″W	
655	Knockroe Passage Tomb	Passage Tomb		Knockroe (Kells, Killamery)	52°25′54″N 7°23′59″W	
399	Dunmore Cave	Cave		Ballyfoyle	52°44′02″N 7°14′48″W	
180	Kells Priory	Priory (Augustinian)		Rathduff (Madden)	52°32′19″N 7°16′01″W	
376	Rathealy Ringfort	Ringfort		Rathealy	52°41′41″N 7°25′57″W	
73	Sheepstown Church	Church		Sheepstown	52°29′06″N 7°14′36″W	
72	St. Francis Abbey (Kilkenny)	Friary (Franciscan)		St. Mary's Parish	52°39′21″N 7°15′12″W	
191	Thomastown Church	Church		Thomastown	52°31′33″N 7°08′22″W	
161	Tullaherin	Round Tower		Tullaherin	52°34′45″N 7°07′50″W	
670	Tullaroan Church	Church		Tullaroan	52°39′29″N 7°26′01″W	
78	Ullard Church	Church		Ullard	52°34′49″N 6°55′59″W	
372	Callan Motte	Motte		Westcourt Demesne	52°32′48″N 7°23′29″W	
	St. Lachtain's Church, Freshford	Church		Freshford Lots	52°43′58″N 7°23′52″W	
	Shee Alms House	Almshouse		Gardens	52°39′05″N 7°15′06″W	
	Kyteler's Inn	Public house		Gardens	52°39′11″N 7°15′12″W	
	Archer Mansion	early modern townhouse		Gardens	52°39′05″N 7°15′11″W	
	Rothe House	early modern townhouse		Gardens	52°39′15″N 7°15′18″W	
540	Aghnahily Ringfort	Ringfort		Aghnahily	53°01′33″N 7°12′21″W	
567	Coorlaghan Ringfort	Ringfort		Coorlaghan	52°50′14″N 7°00′39″W	
615	Dunamase Castle	Castle		Portlaoise and Stradbally	53°01′55″N 7°12′39″W	
113	St. Kieran's Church	Church & Cross		Errill	52°51′11″N 7°40′19″W	
114.01	Fossy Church	Church		Fossy Lower	52°57′27″N 7°11′25″W	
115	Killeshin Church	Church		Killeshin	52°50′51″N 7°00′05″W	
116	Sleaty Church	Church & Crosses		Sleaty	52°51′29″N 6°56′31″W	
114.02	Timahoe Church	Church & Round Tower		Timahoe	52°57′38″N 7°12′13″W	
630	Aghaward fort	Ringfort		Aghaward	53°47′32″N 7°38′41″W	
677	Corlea Trackway	Timber Trackway		Corlea	53°37′25″N 7°52′22″W	
91	Inchcleraun	Early Medieval Ecclesiastical Site		Inchcleraun	53°35′06″N 8°00′40″W	
640	Larkfield fort	Ringfort		Larkfield	53°50′30″N 7°32′46″W	
263	Granard Motte	Motte & Bailey		Granard	53°46′35″N 7°30′07″W	
598	Sonnagh fort	Ringfort		Sonnagh	53°49′51″N 7°36′02″W	
326	Aghnaskeagh Cairns	Two Cairns		Aghnaskeagh	54°03′39″N 6°21′28″W	
LH018-040	Athclare Castle	Castle		Athclare	53°29′08″N 6°14′07″W	
480	Mansfieldstown Church	Church		Bawn	53°53′49″N 6°26′45″W	
249	Carlingford Castle	Castle		Carlingford	54°02′36″N 6°11′13″W	
242	The Mint	Urban Tower House		Carlingford	54°02′24″N 6°11′11″W	
388	Dun Dealgan	Motte		Castletown	54°00′50″N 6°25′49″W	
526	Donaghmore Souterrain	Souterrain		Donaghmore	54°00′11″N 6°27′36″W	
511	St. Laurence's Gate	Town Gate		Drogheda	53°46′31″N 7°30′01″W	
92	Dromiskin	Church & Round Tower		Dromiskin	53°55′20″N 6°23′54″W	
144	Greenmount motte	Motte		Greenmount	53°52′41″N 6°23′08″W	
623	Carlingford Abbey	Friary (Dominican)		Carlingford	54°02′17″N 6°11′04″W	
579	Lisnaran Fort	Ringfort		Linns	53°52′58″N 6°20′49″W	
93	Mellifont Abbey	Abbey (Cistercian)		Drogheda	53°44′33″N 6°27′59″W	
94	Monasterboice	High crosses, churches & round tower		Monasterboice	53°46′39″N 6°25′05″W	
312	St. Mochta's House	Church		Priorstate	53°57′12″N 6°32′44″W	
476	Proleek Dolmen	Portal Tomb & wedge Tomb		Proleek	54°02′14″N 6°20′54″W	
474	Clochafarmore	Standing Stone		Rathiddy	53°58′28″N 6°27′57″W	
597	Ravensdale Park	Cairn		Ravensdale Park	54°04′45″N 6°19′18″W	
460	Castleroche Castle	Castle		Dundalk	54°02′47″N 6°29′18″W	
562	Rockmarshall Court Tomb	Court Tomb		Annaloughan	54°00′33″N 6°17′05″W	
298	Roodstown Castle	Castle		Roodstown	53°52′21″N 6°29′12″W	
178	Termonfeckin Castle	Castle		Termonfeckin	53°45′43″N 6°16′01″W	
529	Townleyhall passage grave	Passage Tomb		Townleyhall	53°43′16″N 6°27′05″W	
	Alexander Reid mound	Barrow mound		Alexander Reid	53°39′04″N 6°37′48″W	
546	Ardmulchan Passage Tomb	Passage Tomb		Ardmulchan	53°40′58″N 6°36′35″W	
496	Ardmulchan Fort	Ringfort		Ardmulchan	53°40′28″N 6°37′36″W	
239	Cannistown Church	Church		Ardsallagh	53°37′07″N 6°40′05″W	
539	Athcarne Castle	Castle		Athcarne	53°37′19″N 6°26′29″W	
287	Athlumney Castle	Castle		Athlumney	53°39′01″N 6°40′30″W	
186, 468	The Yellow Steeple & Nangle Castle	Priory (Augustinian) & Castle		Trim	53°33′23″N 6°47′19″W	
356	Balrath Cross	Cross		Balrath	53°37′25″N 6°29′18″W	
187	Bective Abbey	Abbey (Cistercian)		Bective	53°34′58″N 6°42′10″W	
469	Sheep Gate	Town Defences		Trim	53°33′19″N 6°47′16″W	
637	Calliaghstown Well (St. Columcille's Well)	Holy Well		Calliaghstown	53°40′17″N 6°19′46″W	
544	Carrickdexter Cross (Baronstown Cross)	Stone cross (early 17th century)		Carrickdexter	53°42′11″N 6°34′57″W	
676,148	Hill of Tara	Ritual & burial site, church & graveyard		Castletown Tara and Castleboy	53°35′03″N 6°36′53″W	
107	Castlekeeran Crosses	Crosses		Castlekeeran	53°44′28″N 6°57′16″W	
199	St. Patrick's Church	Church		Duleek	53°39′19″N 6°25′12″W	
179	Duleek Church	Church & Crosses		Commons	53°39′18″N 6°25′08″W	
440	Dowdall Cross (Duleek)	Cross		Commons	53°39′15″N 6°25′09″W	
290, 155	Loughcrew	Passage Tomb Cemetery & Other Monuments, Cairn & Standing Stone		Oldcastle	53°44′34″N 7°08′08″W	
264	Cruicetown Church	Church & Cross		Cruicetown	53°48′16″N 6°47′37″W	
309	Danestown Fort	Ringfort/Ringwork		Danestown	53°37′27″N 6°31′24″W	
106	Donaghmore Church	Church & Round Tower		Donaghmore	53°40′13″N 6°39′44″W	
232	Donore Castle	Castle		Donore (Lune barony)	53°29′37″N 6°56′31″W	
410	Dowth Mound	Mound, Standing Stone		Dowth	53°42′20″N 6°26′27″W	
652	Dowth Passage Tomb	Passage Tomb		Dowth	53°42′14″N 6°27′02″W	
482	Dunmoe Castle	Castle		Dunmoe	53°40′27″N 6°38′13″W	
489	Church of St. Nicholas	Church		Dunsany	53°32′11″N 6°37′03″W	
400	St. Seachnail's Church	Church		Dunshaughlin	53°30′52″N 6°32′22″W	
472	Fourknocks Passage Tomb	Passage Tomb		Fourknocks	53°35′48″N 6°19′35″W	
541	Gaulstown Barrow	Round barrow		Gaulstown	53°37′43″N 6°27′25″W	
257	Killeen Church	Church		Killeen	53°32′10″N 6°35′41″W	
409	Knowth Passage Tomb	Cemetery		Knowth	53°42′04″N 6°29′29″W	
549	Knowth Mound	Enclosure & Mound		Knowth	53°42′20″N 6°29′15″W	
543	Loughbracken Fort	Mound and bailey		Loughbrackan	53°50′09″N 6°40′38″W	
514	Trim Castle	Castle		Trim	53°33′15″N 6°47′23″W	
651	Mountfortescue Hillfort	Ringditch, Tumulus & Hillfort		Mountfortescue	53°45′43″N 6°34′34″W	
147.03	Newgrange	Passage Tomb		Newgrange	53°41′41″N 6°28′26″W	
110	Newtown Abbey	Cathedral		Newtown (Trim)	53°33′20″N 6°46′21″W	
551	Ninch	Barrow		Ninch	53°40′37″N 6°14′38″W	
261	Rath Meave	Ritual Enclosure (Henge)		Odder, Belpere	53°34′00″N 6°36′33″W	
289	Rathmore Church	Church, Cross & Base		Rathmore	53°38′35″N 6°52′21″W	
495	Realtogue Fort	Ringfort		Realtogue (Realtoge)	53°38′33″N 6°35′00″W	
322	Athcarne Cross	Wayside cross (c. 1700)		Gaulstown	53°37′39″N 6°26′58″W	
25	Robertstown Castle	Castle (17th century)		Robertstown	53°48′06″N 6°48′33″W	
542	Robertstown Fort	Bivallate ingfort		Robertstown	53°47′39″N 6°49′13″W	
553	Newtown Trim	St. John's Priory		Saint Johns	53°33′18″N 6°46′05″W	
547	Sarsfieldstown Cross	Wayside cross (c. 1500)		Sarsfieldstown	53°39′14″N 6°15′27″W	
109	Skryne Church	Church & Crosses		Skryne	53°35′10″N 6°33′47″W	
666	Slane Church/ St. Patrick's Church	Church		Slane	53°43′02″N 6°32′36″W	
188	Monastery	College		Slane	53°43′03″N 6°32′34″W	
108	St. Columb's House	Church		Kells	53°43′42″N 6°52′51″W	
158	Kells Round Tower	Round Tower & High Crosses		Kells	53°43′39″N 6°52′46″W	
679	Porch Fields	Town gate & medieval roadway		Trim	53°33′19″N 6°47′16″W	
150	Hill of Ward	Earthworks		Wardstown	53°37′33″N 6°53′19″W	
672	Cadamstown Bridge	Bridge		Cadamstown	53°07′53″N 7°39′25″W	
617	Cannakill	Deserted Medieval Village		Cannakill	53°20′45″N 7°17′31″W	
510	Kinnitty Cross	High cross & medieval wall		Kinnitty	53°06′11″N 7°41′51″W	
497	Saighir (Seir Kieran)	Early Medieval Ecclesiastical Site		Churchland and Clonmore	53°04′15″N 7°47′34″W	
336	Clonfinlough Stone	Rock Art		Clonfinlough	53°19′03″N 7°56′09″W	
532	Clonin Earthworks	Earthworks		Clonin and Bawnmore	53°14′16″N 7°18′46″W	
81	Clonmacnoise	Early Medieval Ecclesiastical Site		Clonmacnoise	53°19′37″N 7°59′10″W	
678,313	Durrow Abbey	Cross, Church, graveslabs & motte		Durrow	53°19′34″N 7°31′22″W	
504	Gallen Abbey	Church & Slabs		Gallen	53°15′45″N 7°49′24″W	
82	Rahan Churches	Churches		Rahan	53°16′45″N 7°36′45″W	
520	Athlone Castle	Castle		Athlone	53°25′23″N 7°56′34″W	
481	Delvin Castle	Castle		Delvin	53°36′40″N 7°05′37″W	
560	Dunnamona	Motte		Dunnamona	53°29′58″N 7°47′01″W	
610	Mortimer's Castle	Castle		Faughalstown	53°38′55″N 7°20′26″W	
220	Fore town gates	Town gates		Fore	53°40′45″N 7°13′32″W	
215	Fore Abbey	Abbey (Benedictine) & hermitage		Fore	53°41′02″N 7°13′38″W	
265	Taghmon Church	Church		Glebe	53°36′03″N 7°15′59″W	
213	Inchbofin	Early Medieval Ecclesiastical Site		Inchbofin	53°32′30″N 7°55′03″W	
155	Ushnagh Hill, Catstone	Ringfort, Barrow & Stone		Ushnagh Hill	53°29′18″N 7°33′44″W	
624	Portlick Motte	Motte		Portlick	53°29′28″N 7°54′38″W	
572	Raharney Ringfort	Ringfort		Raharney	53°31′18″N 7°06′15″W	
223	Bealin High Cross	High Cross		Twyford	53°26′07″N 7°50′42″W	
606	Wattstown Barrows	Two Barrows (tumuli)		Wattstown	53°34′32″N 7°26′06″W	
516	Ballyhack Castle	Castle		Ballyhack	52°14′46″N 6°58′03″W	
375	Ballymoty Motte	Motte		Ballymoty More	52°30′20″N 6°27′41″W	
521	Ferns Castle	Castle		Ferns	52°35′27″N 6°29′58″W	
665	Clone Church	Church		Clone	52°34′06″N 6°30′18″W	
644	Coolhull Castle	Fortified House		Coolhull	52°14′03″N 6°42′18″W	
192	Dunbrody Abbey	Abbey (Cistercian)		Dunbrody	52°17′01″N 6°57′33″W	
668	Duncannon Artillery Fort	Artillery fort		Duncannon	52°13′15″N 6°56′12″W	
457	Tacumshane Windmill	Windmill		Tacumshane	52°12′32″N 6°25′26″W	
133	Ferns Church	Church		Ferns	52°35′31″N 6°29′26″W	
133	Ferns Abbey	Priory (Augustinian)		Ferns	52°35′22″N 6°29′30″W	
443	St. Mary's Church	Church		New Ross	52°23′47″N 6°56′27″W	
434	Rathmacknee Castle	Castle		Rathmacknee Great	52°16′09″N 6°29′26″W	
229	Rathumney Castle	Castle		Rathumney	52°17′43″N 6°52′28″W	
429	Slade Castle	Castle		Slade	52°08′02″N 6°54′38″W	
392	Vinegar Hill Windmill	Windmill		Templeshannon	52°30′06″N 6°33′13″W	
506, 614	Tintern Abbey	Abbey (Cistercian), Church & bridge		Tintern	52°14′13″N 6°50′18″W	
445	St. Selskar's Priory	Church (Augustinian)		Wexford	52°20′29″N 6°27′57″W	
137	Aghowle Church	Church & Cross		Aghowle Lower (Shillelagh	52°46′04″N 6°37′13″W	
416	Piper's Stones	Stone Circle		Athgreany	53°04′19″N 6°36′46″W	
203	Baltinglass Abbey	Abbey (Cistercian)		Baltinglass	52°56′38″N 6°42′35″W	
418	Crossoona Rath	Ringfort & Ogham Stone		Boleycarrigeen	52°56′39″N 6°36′51″W	
134	Glendalough	Cathedral, Round Tower, Churches, Priory (Augustinian), Crosses, ringfort, hut site & cave		Glendalough	53°00′37″N 6°19′39″W	
280	St. Mark's Cross	High Cross		Burgage More	53°09′41″N 6°32′29″W	
442	Castleruddery Motte	Motte		Castleruddery Lower	52°59′34″N 6°38′40″W	
441	Castleruddery Stone Circle	Stone Circle		Castleruddery Lower	52°59′28″N 6°38′12″W	
304	Castletimon Ogham Stone	Ogham Stone		Castletimon	52°54′16″N 6°04′13″W	
662	Rath Turtle Moat	Ringfort		Deerpark	53°10′46″N 6°33′28″W	
449	Dwyer–McAllister Cottage	House with historical associations		Derrynamuck (Donard)	52°57′44″N 6°33′53″W	
337	Fassaroe Cross	Cross		Fassaroe, Bray	53°11′46″N 6°08′26″W	
267	Kilcoole Church	Church		Kilcoole	53°06′25″N 6°03′46″W	
417	Kilcroney Church	Church		Kilcroney	53°11′10″N 6°08′20″W	
323	Kindlestown Castle	Castle		Kindlestown Upper	53°08′28″N 6°05′20″W	
419	Lemonstown Motte	Motte		Lemonstown	53°05′07″N 6°39′27″W	
368	Moylisha Wedge Tomb	Wedge Tomb		Moylisha	52°45′05″N 6°37′20″W	
262	Raheenachluig Church	Church		Newcourt	53°11′38″N 6°05′26″W	
328	Rathcoran	Passage Tomb & Hillfort		Coolinarrig Upper, Pinnacle, Tuckmill Hill	52°56′49″N 6°41′00″W	
422	Rathgall	Hill Fort		Rath	52°48′08″N 6°39′47″W	
317	Seefin Passage Tomb	Passage Tomb		Scurlocksleap	53°11′10″N 6°23′42″W	
491	Threecastles Castle	Castle		Threecastles	53°10′54″N 6°29′14″W	
531	Tornant Moat	Ringfort & Barrows		Tornant Lower	53°02′43″N 6°42′04″W	
135	St. Mary's Church, Downsmill	Church (11th century)		Woodlands	53°07′47″N 6°06′38″W	

== See also ==
- National Monument (Ireland)
