= List of national monuments in County Meath =

Monuments in Meath, Ireland

The Irish state has officially approved the following list of national monuments in County Meath. In the Republic of Ireland, a structure or site may be deemed to be a "national monument", and therefore worthy of state protection, if it is of national importance. If the land adjoining the monument is essential to protect it, this land may also be protected.

== National Monuments ==
NM#	Monument name	Description	Image	Townland	Location
	Alexander Reid mound	Barrow mound		Alexander Reid	53°39′04″N 6°37′48″W
546	Ardmulchan Passage Tomb	Passage Tomb		Ardmulchan	53°40′58″N 6°36′35″W
496	Ardmulchan Fort	Ringfort		Ardmulchan	53°40′28″N 6°37′36″W
239	Cannistown Church	Church		Ardsallagh	53°37′07″N 6°40′05″W
539	Athcarne Castle	Castle		Athcarne	53°37′19″N 6°26′29″W
287	Athlumney Castle	Castle		Athlumney	53°39′01″N 6°40′30″W
186, 468	The Yellow Steeple & Nangle Castle	Priory (Augustinian) & Castle		Trim	53°33′23″N 6°47′19″W
356	Balrath Cross	Cross		Balrath	53°37′25″N 6°29′18″W
187	Bective Abbey	Abbey (Cistercian)		Bective	53°34′58″N 6°42′10″W
469	Sheep Gate	Town Defences		Trim	53°33′19″N 6°47′16″W
637	Calliaghstown Well (St. Columcille's Well)	Holy Well		Calliaghstown	53°40′17″N 6°19′46″W
544	Carrickdexter Cross (Baronstown Cross)	Stone cross (early 17th century)		Carrickdexter	53°42′11″N 6°34′57″W
676,148	Hill of Tara	Ritual & burial site, church & graveyard		Castletown Tara and Castleboy	53°35′03″N 6°36′53″W
107	Castlekeeran Crosses	Crosses		Castlekeeran	53°44′28″N 6°57′16″W
199	St. Patrick's Church	Church		Duleek	53°39′19″N 6°25′12″W
179	Duleek Church	Church & Crosses		Commons	53°39′18″N 6°25′08″W
440	Dowdall Cross (Duleek)	Cross		Commons	53°39′15″N 6°25′09″W
290, 155	Loughcrew	Passage Tomb Cemetery & Other Monuments, Cairn & Standing Stone		Oldcastle	53°44′34″N 7°08′08″W
264	Cruicetown Church	Church & Cross		Cruicetown	53°48′16″N 6°47′37″W
309	Danestown Fort	Ringfort/Ringwork		Danestown	53°37′27″N 6°31′24″W
106	Donaghmore Church	Church & Round Tower		Donaghmore	53°40′13″N 6°39′44″W
232	Donore Castle	Castle		Donore (Lune barony)	53°29′37″N 6°56′31″W
410	Dowth Mound	Mound, Standing Stone		Dowth	53°42′20″N 6°26′27″W
652	Dowth Passage Tomb	Passage Tomb		Dowth	53°42′14″N 6°27′02″W
482	Dunmoe Castle	Castle		Dunmoe	53°40′27″N 6°38′13″W
489	Church of St. Nicholas	Church		Dunsany	53°32′11″N 6°37′03″W
400	St. Seachnail's Church	Church		Dunshaughlin	53°30′52″N 6°32′22″W
472	Fourknocks Passage Tomb	Passage Tomb		Fourknocks	53°35′48″N 6°19′35″W
541	Gaulstown Barrow	Round barrow		Gaulstown	53°37′43″N 6°27′25″W
257	Killeen Church	Church		Killeen	53°32′10″N 6°35′41″W
409	Knowth Passage Tomb	Cemetery		Knowth	53°42′04″N 6°29′29″W
549	Knowth Mound	Enclosure & Mound		Knowth	53°42′20″N 6°29′15″W
543	Loughbracken Fort	Mound and bailey		Loughbrackan	53°50′09″N 6°40′38″W
514	Trim Castle	Castle		Trim	53°33′15″N 6°47′23″W
651	Mountfortescue Hillfort	Ringditch, Tumulus & Hillfort		Mountfortescue	53°45′43″N 6°34′34″W
147.03	Newgrange	Passage Tomb		Newgrange	53°41′41″N 6°28′26″W
110	Newtown Abbey	Cathedral		Newtown (Trim)	53°33′20″N 6°46′21″W
551	Ninch	Barrow		Ninch	53°40′37″N 6°14′38″W
261	Rath Meave	Ritual Enclosure (Henge)		Odder, Belpere	53°34′00″N 6°36′33″W
289	Rathmore Church	Church, Cross & Base		Rathmore	53°38′35″N 6°52′21″W
495	Realtogue Fort	Ringfort		Realtogue (Realtoge)	53°38′33″N 6°35′00″W
322	Athcarne Cross	Wayside cross (c. 1700)		Gaulstown	53°37′39″N 6°26′58″W
25	Robertstown Castle	Castle (17th century)		Robertstown	53°48′06″N 6°48′33″W
542	Robertstown Fort	Bivallate ingfort		Robertstown	53°47′39″N 6°49′13″W
553	Newtown Trim	St. John's Priory		Saint Johns	53°33′18″N 6°46′05″W
547	Sarsfieldstown Cross	Wayside cross (c. 1500)		Sarsfieldstown	53°39′14″N 6°15′27″W
109	Skryne Church	Church & Crosses		Skryne	53°35′10″N 6°33′47″W
666	Slane Church/ St. Patrick's Church	Church		Slane	53°43′02″N 6°32′36″W
188	Monastery	College		Slane	53°43′03″N 6°32′34″W
108	St. Columb's House	Church		Kells	53°43′42″N 6°52′51″W
158	Kells Round Tower	Round Tower & High Crosses		Kells	53°43′39″N 6°52′46″W
679	Porch Fields	Town gate & medieval roadway		Trim	53°33′19″N 6°47′16″W
150	Hill of Ward	Earthworks		Wardstown	53°37′33″N 6°53′19″W

== Sources ==
- National Monuments in County Meath
