= Robertstown =

Robertstown may refer to:

- Robertstown, County Kildare, village in Ireland
  - Robertstown GFC, Gaelic Football and Athletics Club
- Robertstown, County Limerick, civil parish in County Limerick, Ireland
- Robertstown, Moray, location in Moray, Scotland
- Robertstown, a village in Aberdare East, Rhondda Cynon Taf, Wales
- Robertstown, South Australia
  - Robertstown railway line
- Robertstown, Georgia, a community in the United States
- Robertstown Fort, County Meath, Ireland
- Robertstown Castle, County Meath, Ireland
- Robertstown University, a fake university formerly operated by an American fraud ring

== See also ==
- Roberts Township (disambiguation)
- Roberttown, village in West Yorkshire
