= Crutched Friars =

Former Catholic religious order

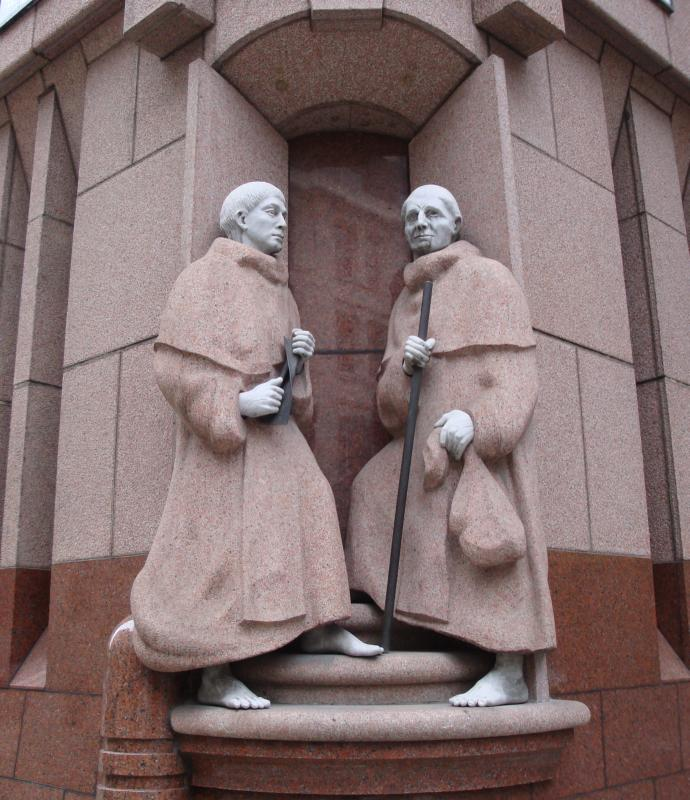
Statue of two Crutched Friars in London

The Crutched Friars (also Crossed or Crouched Friars, cross-bearing brethren) were a Roman Catholic religious order in England and Ireland. Their name is derived from a staff they carried with them surmounted by a crucifix. There were several orders devoted to the Holy Cross, collectively known as Crosiers, that had some presence in England and there is much confusion regarding which specific order the friars belonged to. Earlier literature linked most of the Crutched Friars to the Italian Crosiers, but later it was proven that they were a branch of the Belgian Canons Regular of the Order of the Holy Cross. The Crutched Friars were suppressed during the Dissolution of the Monasteries in 1538.

== England ==
Their first appearance in England was at a synod of the Diocese of Rochester in 1244, when they presented documents from the Pope and asked to be allowed to settle in the country. They established eight or nine houses in England, the first being at either Colchester (according to Dugdale), or at Reigate (according to Reyner), founded in 1245. They settled in London in 1249, where they gave their name to the locality, near Tower Hill, still called Crutched Friars. Other houses were at Oxford; York; Great Welnetham (Suffolk); Barham (Cambridgeshire) (a cell to Great Welnetham); Wotten-under-Edge, Gloucestershire; Brackley, Northamptonshire; and Kildale, Yorkshire. The order was dissolved, along with other Catholic orders, by Henry VIII in 1539.

== Ireland ==
The Fratres Cruciferi appeared in Ireland at some time before 1176 when they are first listed as being in possession of the Hospital of St. John without the New Gate in Dublin. It is likely that they based this hospital on the Hospital of St. John in Jerusalem. The founding of these hospitals gave care to both men and women from all religions. The Hospital (which became known in later centuries as Palmer's Hospital and had a capacity of 155 beds) had been founded by the Norse-Gael Ailred the Palmer and his wife some time prior to 1188 when Pope Clement III granted the Hospital certain privileges. The Hospital occupied the site on Thomas Street, Dublin now occupied by the Augustinian Church of Saint Augustine and Saint John the Baptist now served by the mendicant Order of St. Augustine (not to be confused with either the Augustinian Canons – who had many foundations in Ireland, introduced by St. Laurence O'Toole as Archbishop of Dublin to, amongst other churches, Christ Church Dublin – or the Fratres Cruciferi). The Register and Charters of the Hospital have survived in manuscript; they were published by the Irish Manuscripts Commission in 1937 (in the original Latin).

The order owned several hospitals and priories in Ireland, including Palmerstown (which was owned by the Hospital of St John the Baptist without the Newgate in Dublin pictures, County Dublin (the town of Palmerstown is named after [Ailred de] Palmer named the founder of the hospital); Kilkenny West, County Westmeath; the Priory and Hospital of St. John the Baptist of Nenagh, County Tipperary; Rindoon, County Roscommon; King's Island, Limerick City; Ardee, County Louth; Castledermot, County Kildare; Athy, County Kildare; New Ross, County Wexford; St. John's Priory, Trim, County Meath; and Dundalk, County Louth. The dissolution by Henry VIII of the Order in England in 1539 also applied in Ireland. George Dowdall, last head of the Irish order, was compensated by becoming Archbishop of Armagh.
