= Round barrow =

Hemispherical mound of earth and/or stone raised over a burial placed in the middle

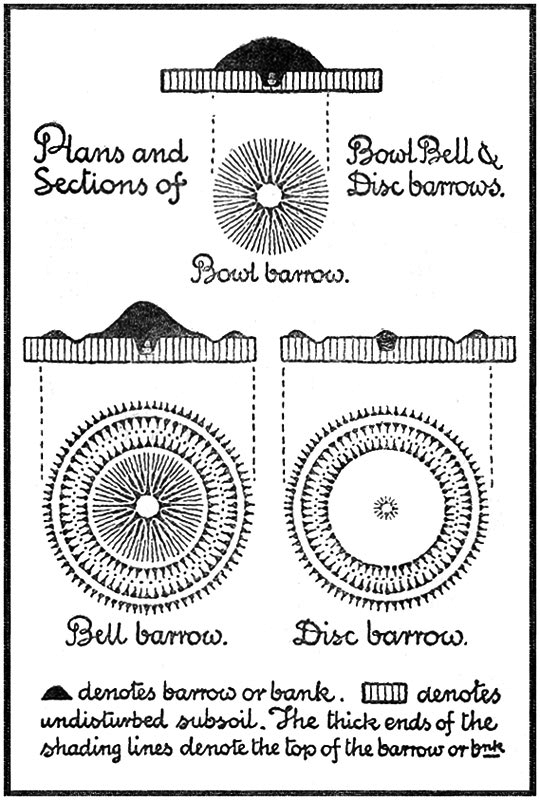
Schematic plans and sections of various types of round barrow

A round barrow is a type of tumulus and is one of the most common types of archaeological monuments. Although concentrated in Europe, they are found in many parts of the world, probably because of their simple construction and universal purpose.

In Britain, most of them were built between 2200BC and 1100BC. This was the Late Neolithic period to the Late Bronze Age. Later Iron Age barrows were mostly different, and sometimes square.

== Description ==
At its simplest, a round barrow is a hemispherical mound of earth and/or stone raised over a burial placed in the middle. Beyond this there are numerous variations which may employ surrounding ditches, stone kerbs or flat berms between ditch and mound. Construction methods range from a single creation process of heaped material to a complex depositional sequence involving alternating layers of stone, soil and turf with timbers or wattle used to help hold the structure together.

In the center may be placed a stone chamber or cist or a cut grave. Both intact inhumations and cremations placed in vessels can be found.

Many round barrows attract surrounding satellite burials or later ones inserted into the mound itself. In some cases these occur hundreds or even thousands of years after the original barrow was built and were placed by entirely different cultures.

Numerous subtypes include the bell barrow, bowl barrow, saucer barrow and disc barrow.

== Examples ==
=== Scandinavia ===
==== Denmark ====
Denmark has many tumuli, including round barrows. The round barrows here were built over a very broad span of time and culture, from the Neolithic Stone Age to the Viking Age. They show a large variation of construction design while sharing a common exterior look. Tumuli were protected by law in 1937.

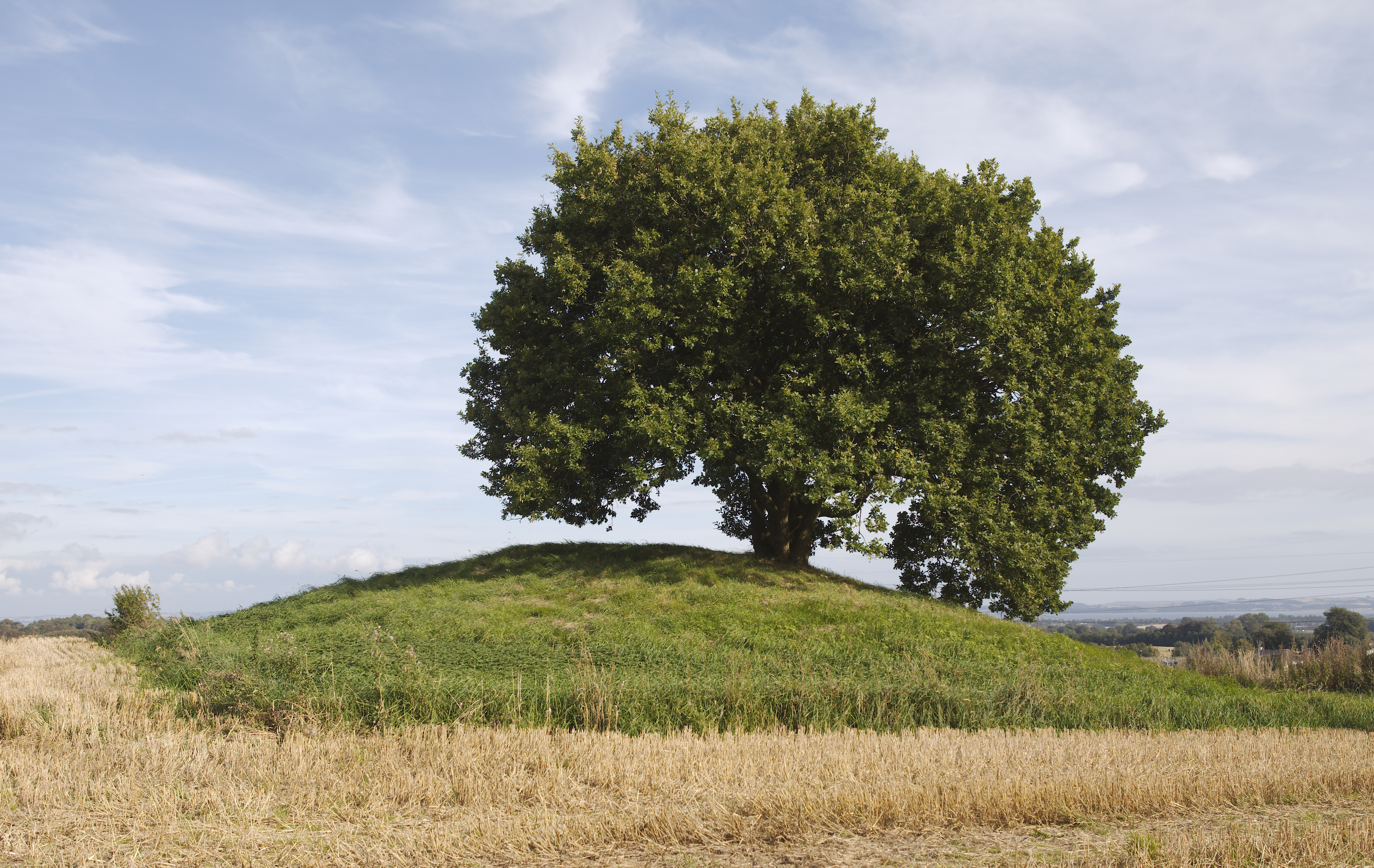
Loddenhøj near Aarhus. Many smaller round barrows in Denmark are encircled by agricultural fields.

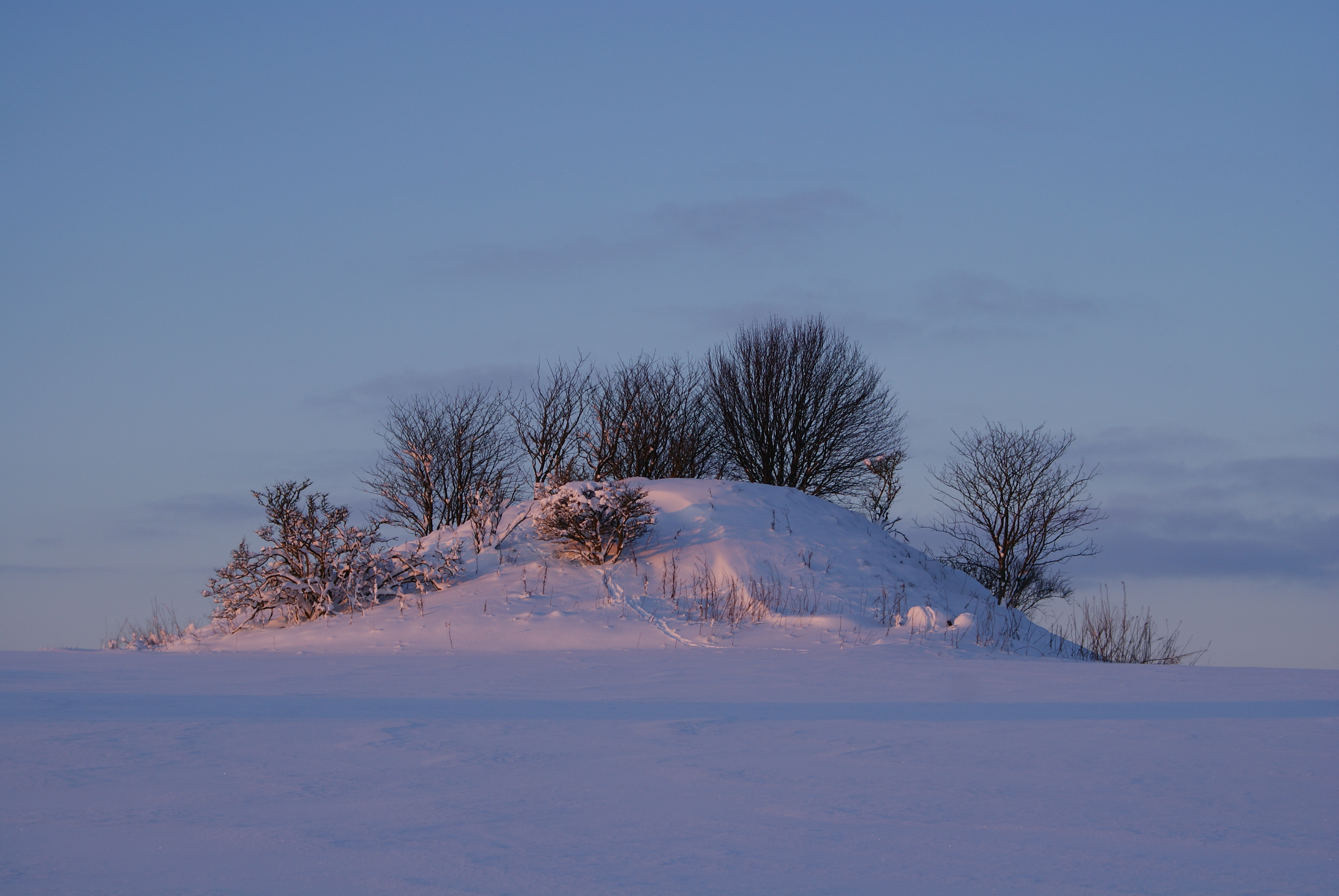
Tinghøjen near Randers. Many barrows are overgrown by shrubs or trees.

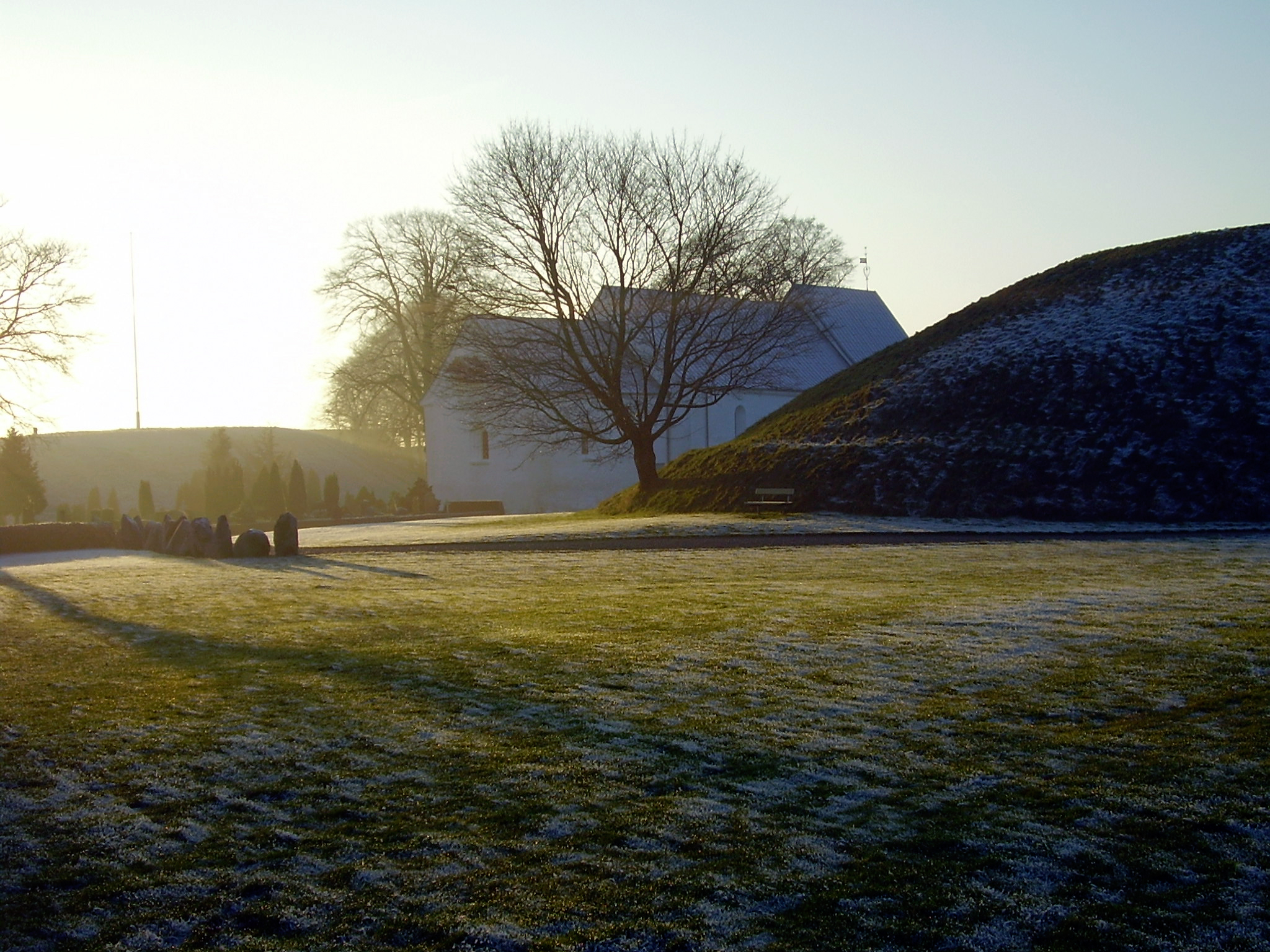
The two round barrows at Jelling from the Viking Age, are the youngest in Denmark.

=== Britain ===
In Britain round barrows generally date to the Early Bronze Age although Neolithic examples are also known. Later round barrows were also sometimes used by Roman, Viking and Saxon societies. Examples include Rillaton barrow and Round Loaf. Where several contemporary round barrows are grouped together, the area is referred to as a barrow cemetery.

==== England ====
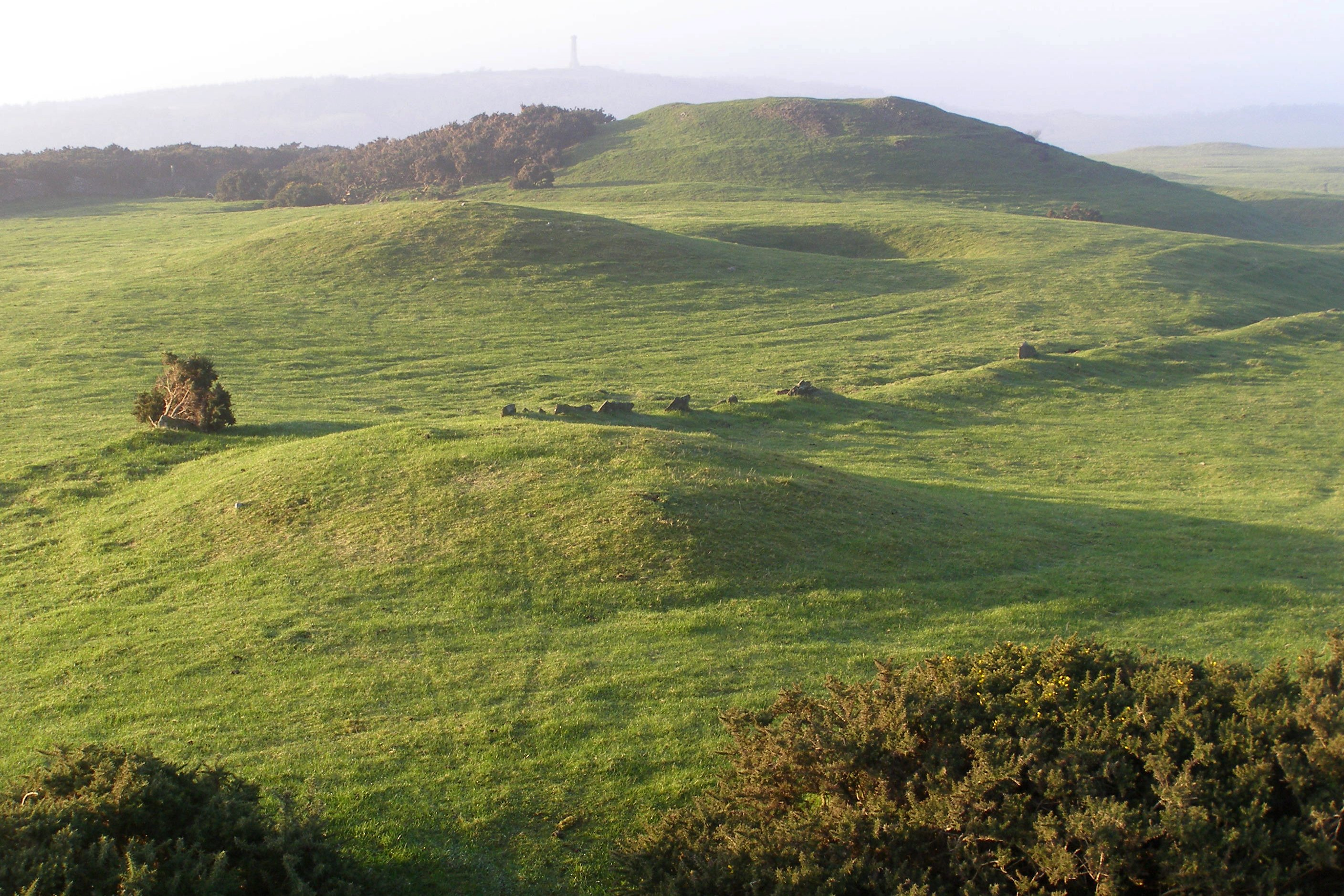
Round barrows on the chalk ridge of Bronkam Hill in Dorset, England. There are numerous round barrows along the south Dorset Ridgeway, including some well-preserved examples of the different sub-types.

===== Lincolnshire =====
- Beacon Hill, near Cleethorpes
- Bully Hill, near Tealby
- Bully Hills, Gräberfeld near Tathwell
- Burgh on Bain, Barrows near Burgh on Bain
- Burwell Wood, Barrows near Muckton
- Buslingthorpe, near Buslingthorpe
- Butterbumps, Gräberfeld near Willoughby
- Cleatham Barrow, near Manton
- Donnington-on-Bain, near Donington on Bain
- Folk Moot & Butt Mound, near Silk Willoughby
- Fordington Barrows, near Ulceby
- Grim's Mound, near Burgh on Bain
- Hagworthingham, near Hagworthingham
- Hatcliffe Barrow, near Hatcliffe
- Howe Hill, near Ulceby
- King's Hill, Barrow/Mound near Bardney
- Ludford Barrow, near Ludford
- Mill Hill, near Claxby
- Revesby Barrows, near Revesby
- Ring Holt, near Dalby

==== Ireland ====
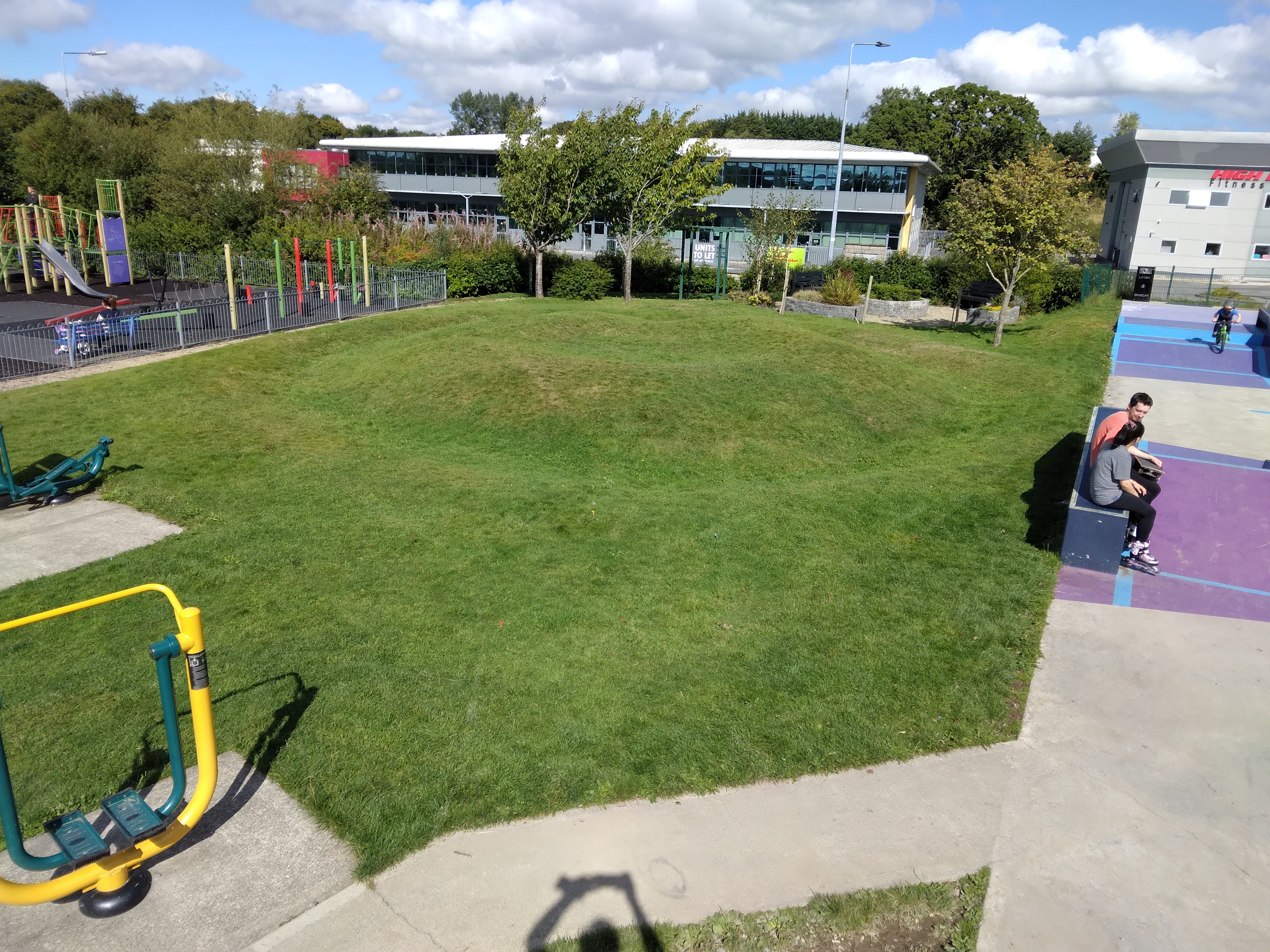
A barrow preserved in an urban environment between a skatepark, an outdoor gym, and a playground in Blessington, Ireland

- Blessington demesne barrow, County Wicklow
- Gaulstown Barrow, County Meath
- Mullyash Kerbed Cairn (bowl barrow), County Monaghan
- Wattstown Barrows, County Westmeath

== See also ==
- Kurgan
- Stupa
- Tumulus
