= Roberts Township =

Roberts Township may refer to:

- Roberts Township, Jefferson County, Arkansas, in Jefferson County, Arkansas
- Roberts Township, Marshall County, Illinois
- Roberts Township, Wilkin County, Minnesota
