= Mortimer's Castle =

- Caisleán De Moirtiméir (Irish)
- Fahatty Castle; The Old Court
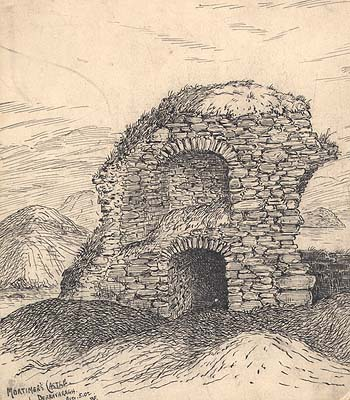
- Ink drawing by the Rev. William Falkiner, 1902.

- Location within Ireland
- 53.648607°N 7.341412°W
- Type: Castle
- Location: Faughalstown, County Westmeath, Ireland

History
- Built: 14th/15th century

Site notes
- Area: Inny Valley
- Architectural style: Anglo-Norman

National monument of Ireland
- Official name: Mortimer's Castle
- Reference no.: 610

Mortimer's Castle is a castle and National Monument located in County Westmeath, Ireland.

== Location ==
Mortimer's Castle is located on the east bank of Lough Derravaragh, 4.4 km (2.7 mi) southwest of Castlepollard.

== History ==
The castle is believed to derive its name from Roger Mortimer, 4th Earl of March (1374–98), who was Henry IV's Lord Lieutenant of Ireland for the last three years of his life, before dying in an ambush at Kells, County Meath (or maybe Kells, County Kilkenny or Kellistown, County Carlow).

Other accounts connect it with Edmund de Mortimer, 5th Earl of March and 7th Earl of Ulster (1391–1425), who was born at New Forest near Tyrrellspass.

A local legend said that a large amount of gold was buried in a cellar on the site, guarded by a black cat.

== Building ==
A large Anglo-Norman castle stood on the site, 52 m × 125 m (57 yd × 137 yd) in dimensions. The remains of a two-storey stone tower are in the northwest corner.
