= St. Patrick's Church, Duleek =

- St. Cianán's Church
- Daimhliag Chianáin
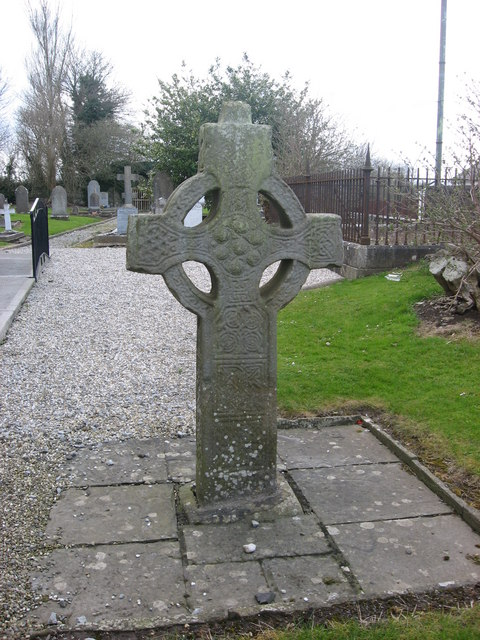
- 9th century high cross associated with St Patrick's Church

- Location within Ireland
- 53°39′19″N 6°25′12″W
- Location: Church Lane, Duleek, County Meath
- Country: Ireland
- Denomination: Celtic Christianity

History
- Status: Ruins
- Founder: Saint Patrick

Architecture
- Heritage designation

National monument of Ireland
- Official name: St. Patrick's Church
- Reference no.: 179
- Years built: 6th–7th centuries

Specifications
- Length: 12 m (39 ft)
- Width: 6.4 m (21 ft)
- Height: 2.15 m (7 ft 1 in)
- Materials: limestone

Administration
- Diocese: Meath

St. Patrick's Church, Duleek is a medieval church and National Monument in County Meath, Ireland. It is believed to have been the first stone church built in Ireland.

== Location ==
St. Patrick's Church is located just north of Church Lane in Duleek, 400 m (1,300 ft) northwest of the Nanny River.

== History ==
According to tradition, St Patrick established a bishopric here c. AD 450 and placed it in the care of Saint Cianán in 489. It acquires its name from the Irish damhliag, "stone house," as it is believed to have been the first stone church in Ireland. It is mentioned in the Annals of Ulster for AD 724. Other churches were known as dairthech, "oak house," as they were made of oak wood. Duleek was sacked by Vikings in 830. In 1014 the bodies of Brian Boru and his son Murchad mac Briain lay in state at Duleek. The Vikings plundered it again in 1149 and the Normans in 1171.

== Church ==
St. Patrick's Church, Duleek is a simple rectangular structure. The northeast wall is partially missing and the southwest wall is completely absent. There is a pointed doorway of undressed stone in the southeast wall. A limestone slab in the wall reads ÓR DO SCANLA_N ("pray for Scanlain").
