= Gaulstown Barrow =

- Dumha Ghallastúin (Irish)
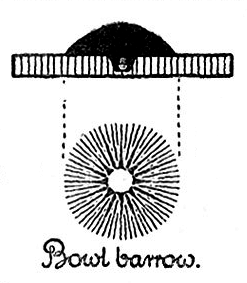
- Diagram of a bowl barrow

- Location within Ireland
- 53.628660°N 6.456907°W
- Type: round barrow
- Location: Gaulstown, Duleek, County Meath, Ireland

History
- Built: c. 3000–2000 BC

Site notes
- Material: earth
- Height: 2.7 m (8 ft 10 in)
- Area: 154 m^{2} (1,660 sq ft)
- Diameter: 14 m (46 ft)
- Owner: State

National monument of Ireland
- Official name: Gaulstown Barrow
- Reference no.: 471

Gaulstown Barrow is a round barrow (bowl barrow) and national monument located in County Meath, Ireland.

== Location ==
Gaulstown Barrow is 2.3 km (1.4 mi) southwest of Duleek, just north of the River Nanny.

== Description ==
Gaulstown Barrow is a circular bowl barrow built over a tomb, probably dating to the late Neolithic or early Bronze Age.
