= Alexander Reid mound =

- Dumha Alastar Reid (Irish)
- Location within Ireland
- 53.651107°N 6.629825°W
- Type: tumulus
- Periods: Bronze or Iron Age (c. 2400 BC – AD 400).
- Location: Alexander Reid, Athlumney, County Meath, Ireland

Site notes
- Material: earth, stone
- Height: 1.5 metres (4.9 ft)
- Diameter: 21 metres (69 ft)
- Circumference: 66 metres (217 ft)

Designations
- Designation: National monument

The Alexander Reid mound is a tumulus (barrow mound) and national monument located in County Meath, Ireland.

== Location ==
Alexander Reid mound is located on the summit of Carn Hill in the Alexander Reid townland, about 3.5 km (2 miles) east of Navan and the River Boyne. The name of the mound is derived from the townland, whose name is a corruption of 'Elyston Rede,' the name recorded in the 15th century, meaning something like "Ellis' settlement on the road."

== Description ==
Alexander Reid mound is a round tumulus made of earth and stones.
