= Athcarne Cross =

Wayside cross in County Meath, Ireland

- Cros Áth Carn (Irish)
- Gaulstown Cross; White Cross
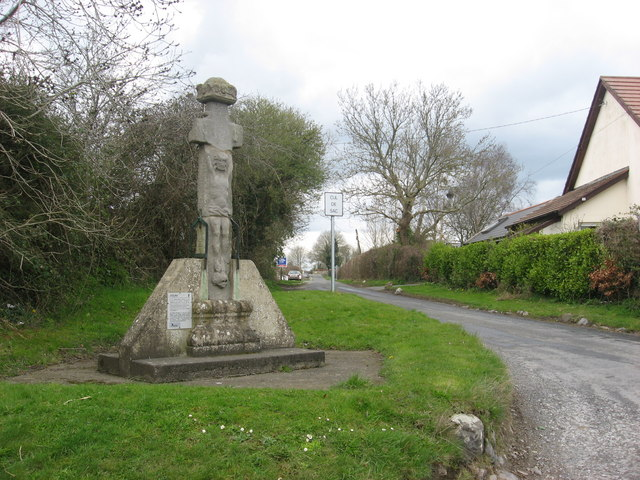

- Location within Ireland
- 53.627492°N 6.449501°W
- Type: Wayside cross
- Location: Gaulstown, Duleek, County Meath, Ireland
- Region: Nanny Valley

History
- Built: c. 1675
- Built by: Cecilia Bathe

Site notes
- Material: sandstone
- Height: 3.11 m (10.2 ft)
- Public access: yes

National monument of Ireland
- Official name: Athcarne (White Cross)
- Reference no.: 322

Athcarne Cross, also called Gaulstown Cross or the White Cross, is a wayside cross and National Monument located in County Meath, Ireland.

== Location ==
Athcarne Cross is located near the sources of the River Nanny, 3.6 km (2.2 mi) southwest of Duleek.

== History ==
The cross was erected in c. 1675 by Dame Cecilia Bathe (née Dowdall) as a memorial to herself and her husband Sir Luke Bathe. The cross had been incorporated into the wall of a cottage but it was conserved as a National Monument in 1935 and is known as Athcarne cross, after nearby Athcarne Castle.

== Description ==
On the east face of the cross is depicted the Crucifixion of Jesus with the arms of Jesus being held high above the head along the shaft of the cross, similar to a crux simplex. His feet rest on a skull and crossbones.

On the west face is the Madonna and Child, with the arms of the Bathe and Dowdall families and the Arma Christi.

The head of the cross has carved angels, similar to other wayside-crosses, and a small Maltese cross.
