= Balrath Cross =

16th-century stone cross in Ireland

- Cros Bhaile an Rátha (Irish)
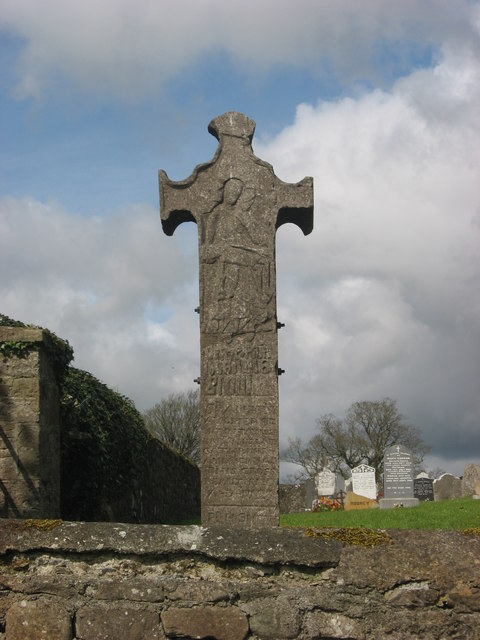
- East face

- Location within Ireland
- 53.62342636°N 6.48694251°W
- Type: Wayside cross
- Location: Balrath, Athboy, County Meath, Ireland

History
- Built: late 16th century AD
- Built by: John Broin?

Site notes
- Material: Stone
- Height: 182 cm (6 ft 0 in)
- Public access: Yes

Designations
- Designation: National Monument

Balrath Cross is a wayside cross and National Monument located in County Meath, Ireland.

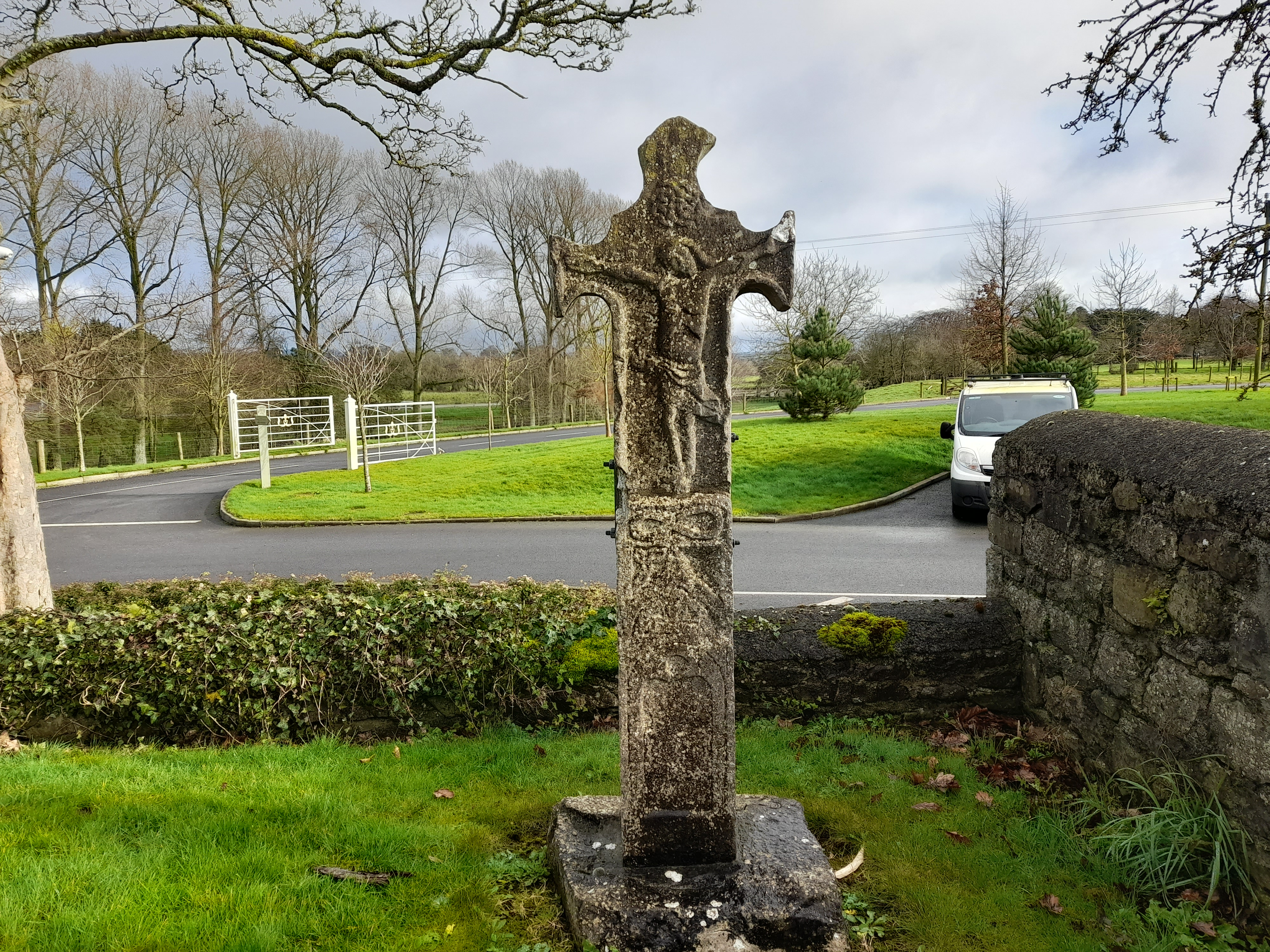
Crucifixion scene (west face)

== Location ==
Balrath Cross is located 3 kilometres (1.9 mi) southwest of Laytown.

== History ==
The cross is believed to have been carved in the late 16th century. It was re-erected in 1727 by the Aylmer family of Balrath. Around 2014 it was moved to accommodate the widening of the N2 road.

== Description ==
A stone cross 182 cm (6 ft 0 in) tall. The arms span 58 cm (1 ft 11 in), and the shaft is 28 cm × 23 cm (11 in × 9 in) at its base.

The east face contains a Pietà and a Latin inscription (ORATEPAIA JOHANIB ROIN, a shortening of Orate pro anima Johanis Broin, "pray for the soul of John Broin"). The west face shows a crucifixion scene.

There is an inscription on it saying Sir Andrew Aylmer of Mountaylmer Bart and his Lady Catherine Aylmer had this cross beautified A. D. 1727.
