= Sarsfieldstown Cross =

National monument in County Meath, Ireland

- Location within Ireland
- 53.653951°N 6.257573°W
- Type: Wayside cross
- Location: Sarsfieldstown, Julianstown; County Meath, Ireland

History
- Built: 1480–1513

Designations
- Designation: National Monument

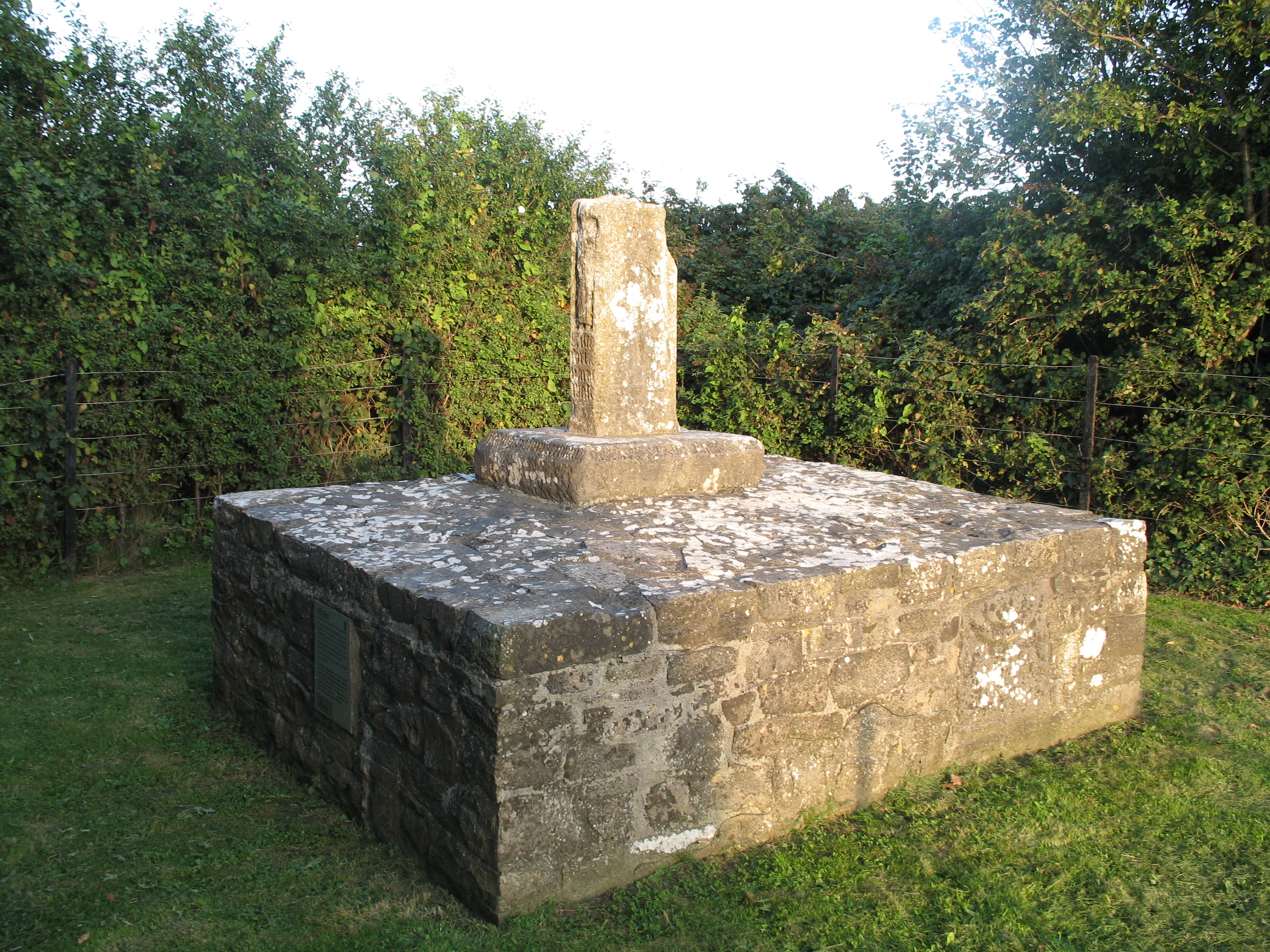
Barnewall Cross at The Gullet, Sarsfieldstown, Co Meath

Sarsfieldstown Cross is a wayside cross and National Monument located in County Meath, Ireland.

== Location ==
Sarsfieldstown Cross is located 3 kilometres (1.9 mi) southwest of Laytown.

== Description ==
Sarsfieldstown Cross is a late 16th-century memorial cross erected to remember Christopher Barnewall (1522–1575). The cross remains as a fragment of a shaft with figure sculpture in false relief and inscription. The inscription in Latin around the base reads: "Archbishop Octavian, Primate of all Ireland, has granted an indulgence in perpetuity, to every penitent, as often as they shall devoutly say an Our Father, and a Hail Mary, for the souls of Christopher Barnewall; Kt, and Elizabeth Plunket, and all the faithful departed."
