= Danestown Fort =

- Ráth Bhaile an Dainigh (Irish)
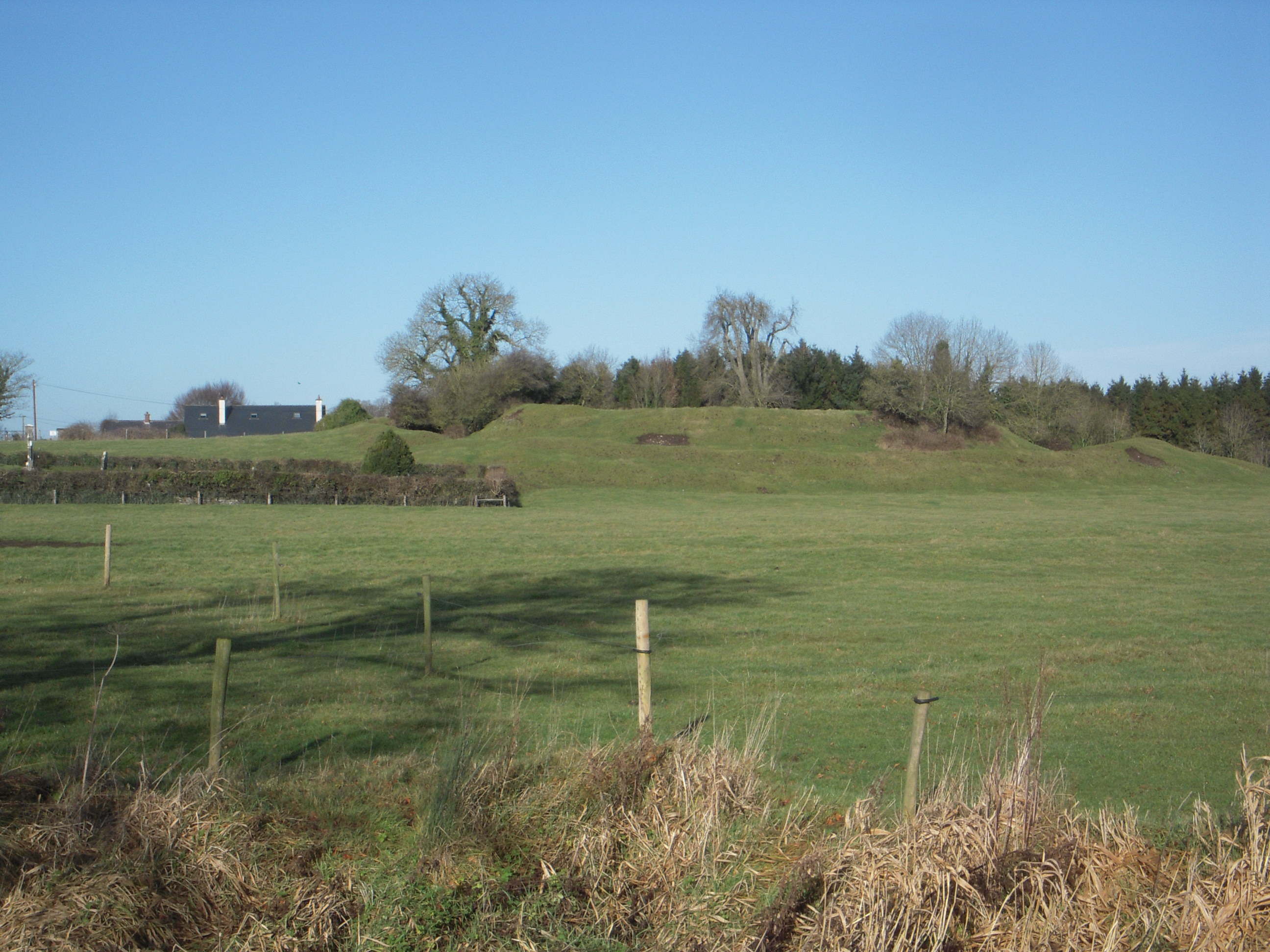

- Location within Ireland
- 53°37′27″N 6°31′24″W
- Type: Ringfort
- Cultures: Gaelic Ireland
- Location: Danestown, County Meath, Ireland

History
- Built: AD 500–1000

Site notes
- Material: Earth
- Area: 1,661 square metres (0.410 acres)
- Diameter: 46 metres (151 ft)

Designations
- Designation: National monument

Danestown Fort is a ringfort (rath) and protected national monument in County Meath, Ireland. It is located approximately 700 metres (770 yd) southeast of Kentstown and on the south bank of the Nanny River, a Boyne tributary. It is a rath with an inner platform over 4 metres (13 ft) high, surrounded by a fosse (ditch) and an outer bank.
