= Cruicetown Church =

- Cill Bhaile Chrúis
- Location within Ireland
- 53.8044°N 6.79366°W
- Location: Cruicetown, Nobber, County Meath
- Country: Ireland
- Denomination: Church of Ireland
- Previous denomination: Pre-Reformation Catholic

History
- Dedication: Saint James

Architecture
- Heritage designation

National monument of Ireland
- Official name: Cruicetown Church
- Reference no.: 264
- Style: Romanesque
- Years built: c. 1200

Specifications
- Length: 19 m (62 ft)
- Width: 4.3 m (14 ft)
- Height: 2.5 m (8 ft 2 in)
- Materials: sandstone, mortar

Administration
- Diocese: Meath

Cruicetown Church is a medieval church and National Monument in County Meath, Ireland.

== Location ==
Cruicetown Church is located 3.6 km (2.2 mi) southwest of Nobber, near the top of a hill overlooking the River Dee.

== History ==
Cruicetown is named after the Cruise family, ancestors of actor Tom Cruise. The church was built c. 1200, as evidenced by the round-headed windows with external rabbets for shutters. A church of the "vill de Cruicetoun" is listed in the ecclesiastical taxation (1302–06) of Pope Nicholas IV. It was described as ruined by 1641.

== Church ==
Cruicetown Church is a nave and chancel and was built around the year 1200. Within the nave is a red sandstone baptismal font and several carved fragments.

In the chancel is the double effigy tomb of Walter Cruice of Naul (d. 1663) and Elizabeth Cruice of Brittas which was erected in 1688 by their son Patrick Cruise. The grave is decorated with trumpet-blowing putti. A carved cross also stands in the graveyard.
