= Killeen Church =

- An Cillín
- Location within Ireland
- 53.536053°N 6.594722°W
- Location: Killeen, Dunsany, County Meath
- Country: Ireland
- Denomination: Church of Ireland
- Previous denomination: Pre-Reformation Catholic

History
- Founder: Sir Christopher Plunkett
- Dedication: Nativity of Mary

Architecture
- Heritage designation

National monument of Ireland
- Official name: Killeen Church
- Reference no.: 257
- Style: Gothic
- Years built: c. 1425
- Closed: 1641

Specifications
- Length: 34 m (112 ft)
- Width: 6.1 m (20 ft)
- Materials: sandstone, mortar

Administration
- Diocese: Meath

Killeen Church is a medieval church and National Monument in County Meath, Ireland.

== Location ==
Killeen Church is located immediately northwest of Killeen Castle, about 4 km (2.5 mi) northwest of Dunshaughlin.

== History ==
Archaeological studies indicate that a church stood on the site in the 7th–9th centuries. No trace of it remains. A second phase of activity saw a ringwork constructed on the site, and a church at Killeen is listed in the ecclesiastical taxation (1302–06) of Pope Nicholas IV.

The current Killeen Church was built by Sir Christopher Plunkett (c. 1370 – c. 1445), a grandson of Sir Richard Plunkett, in the early 15th century. In 1403 Sir Christopher married Lady Joan de Cusack, daughter of Sir Lucas Cusack. In 1432 Sir Christopher Plunkett was appointed deputy to the lord lieutenant, John I Stanley of the Isle of Man, on his recall to England. A chantry was established by Sir Christopher and Lady Joan within the parish church in 1431. A badly damaged fifteenth-century tomb in Killeen Church is probably their gravesite.

Killeen was until 1953 part of the holdings of the Earl of Fingall, and successive earls took care to preserve the church.

== Church ==
The church is a nave and chancel structure. Visible features include a triple sedilia, hagioscope (squint), newel stairs, octagonal baptismal font and decorative carvings including coats of arms and mason's mark.
