= Ardmulchan Fort =

- Ráth Ard Maolchon (Irish)
- Location within Ireland
- 53°40′28″N 6°37′36″W
- Type: Ringfort
- Periods: Middle Ages
- Location: Ardmulchan, County Meath, Ireland

History
- Built: AD 500–1000

Site notes
- Material: earth
- Height: 1.5 metres (4.9 ft)
- Diameter: 21 metres (69 ft)
- Circumference: 66 metres (217 ft)

Designations
- Designation: National Monument

Ardmulchan Fort is a ringfort (rath) and National Monument located in County Meath, Ireland.

== Location ==
Ardmulchan ringfort is located on the right bank of the River Boyne near to Taaffe's Lock, 3.5 km (2 mi) west of Yellow Furze. It should not be confused with another ringfort, also located in Ardmulchan townland, near Broadboyne Bridge, which is not a National Monument.

== Description ==
The ringfort is a flat-topped oval mound of earth (top dimensions 36 metres (118 ft) N–S 27 metres (89 ft) E–W). The height is 6.6 metres (22 ft) at the north end and 4.4 metres (14 ft) at the south. The rath is defined by a scarp around the base.
