= Castlekeeran =

Monastery in Ireland

- Díseart Ciaráin
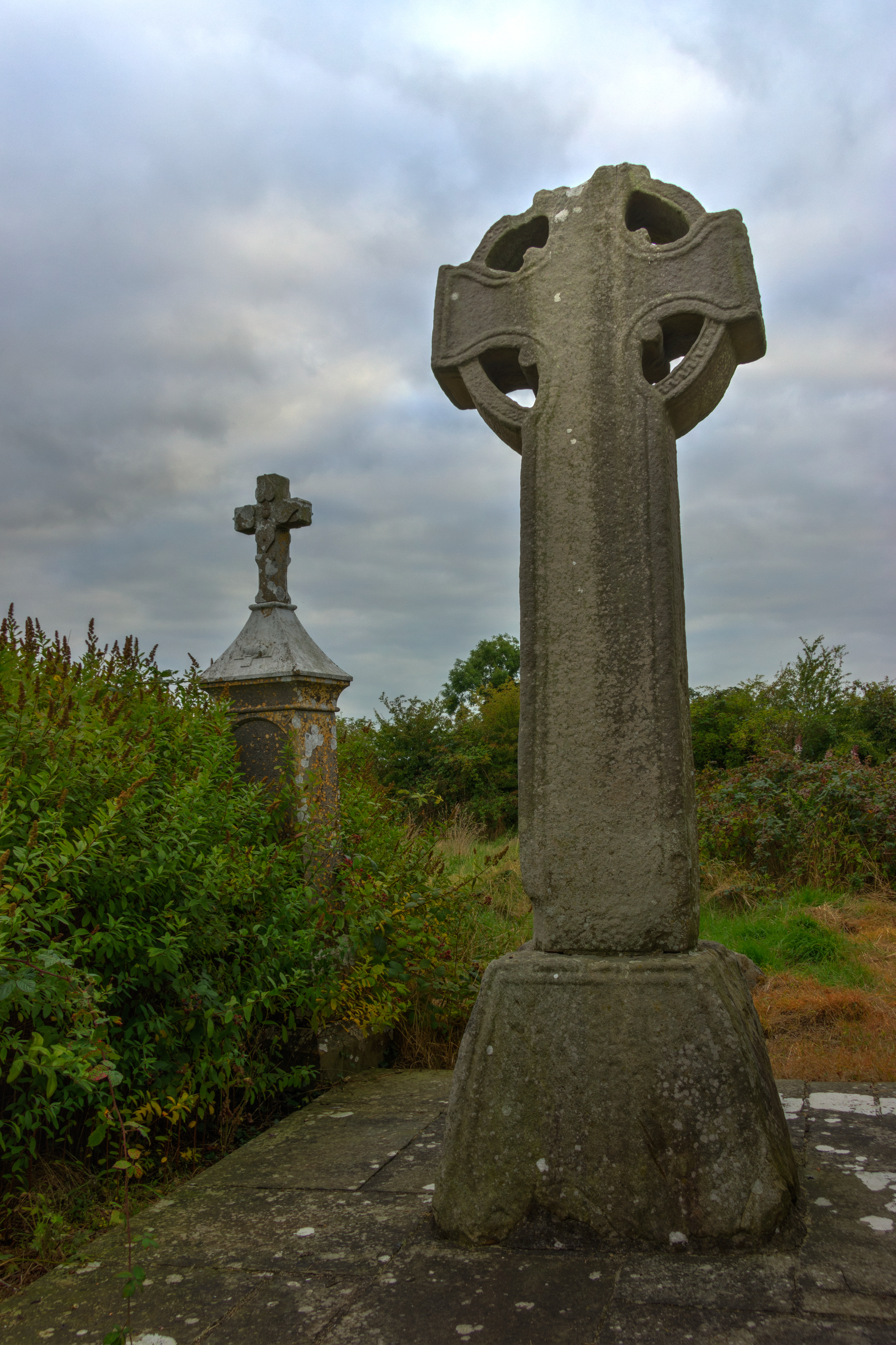
- North Cross

- Location within Ireland
- Interactive map of Castlekeeran

Monastery information
- Other names: Castlekieran; Bealach-duin
- Established: 8th century
- Diocese: Meath

People
- Founder: Ciarán the Pious

Architecture
- Style: Celtic monasticism

Site
- Location: Carnaross, County Meath, Ireland
- Coordinates: 53.741042°N 6.954343°W
- Public access: yes

Castlekeeran is a former monastery and a National Monument in County Meath, Ireland.

== Location ==
Castlekeeran survives as a walled graveyard, 1.1 km (0.68 mi) south of Carnaross and on the south bank of the Leinster Blackwater.

== History ==
Castlekeeran was founded by Ciarán the Pious of Bealach-duin (died 14 June 770). The monastery was raided by Vikings in 949 and by Diarmait Mac Murchada in 1170, before passing through the hands of the Knights Hospitaller and in after the Dissolution of the Monasteries to the Plunket family.

== Description ==
=== High crosses ===
Three sandstone high crosses are on the site. A fourth cross is in the river. According to legend, Columba was stealing the cross, was caught by Ciarán and quickly dumped the cross in the river. They are called termon crosses (from the Irish tearmann, "border") which marked the sānctissimus, the holiest part of the monastery around the church.

Castlekeeran

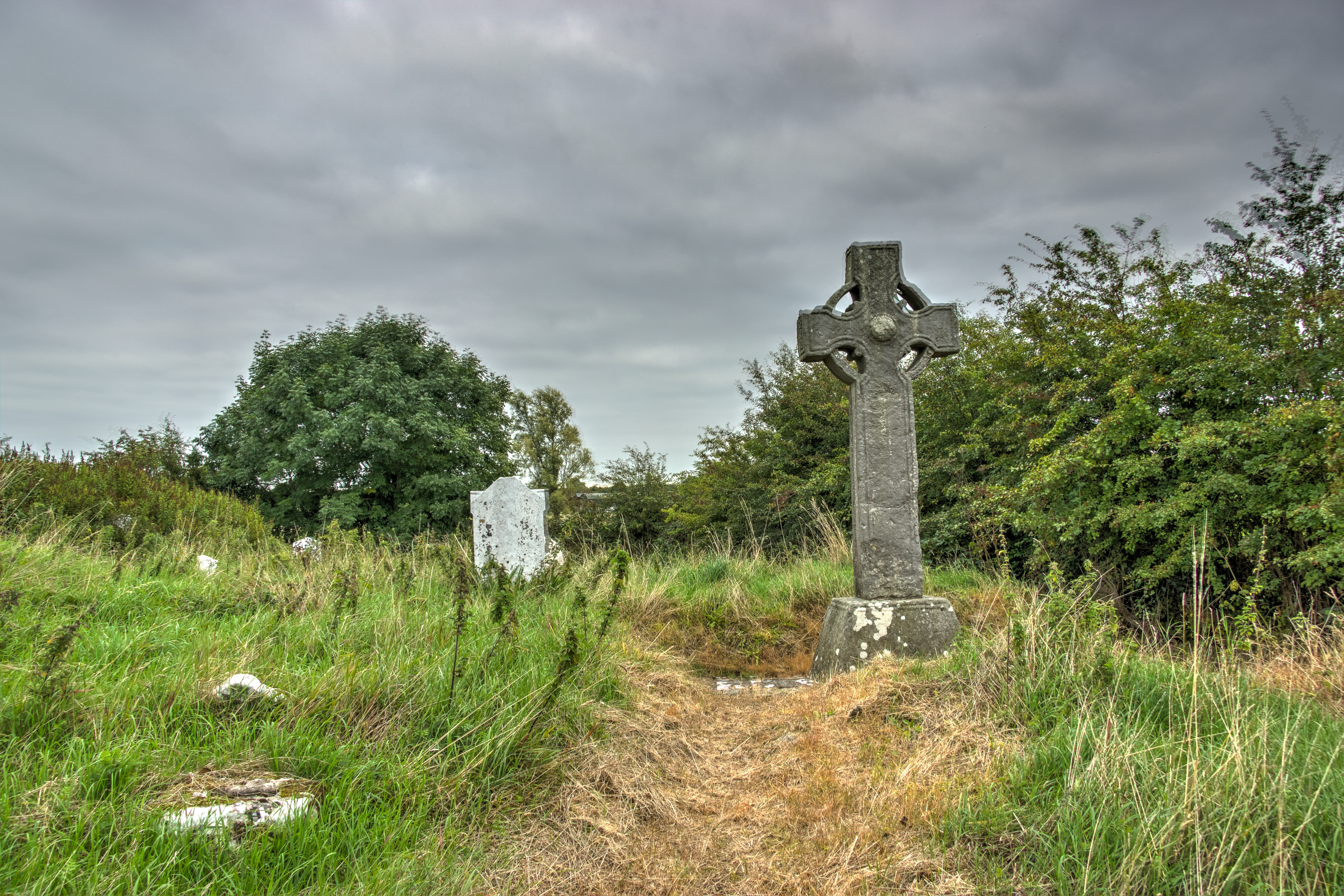
South Cross

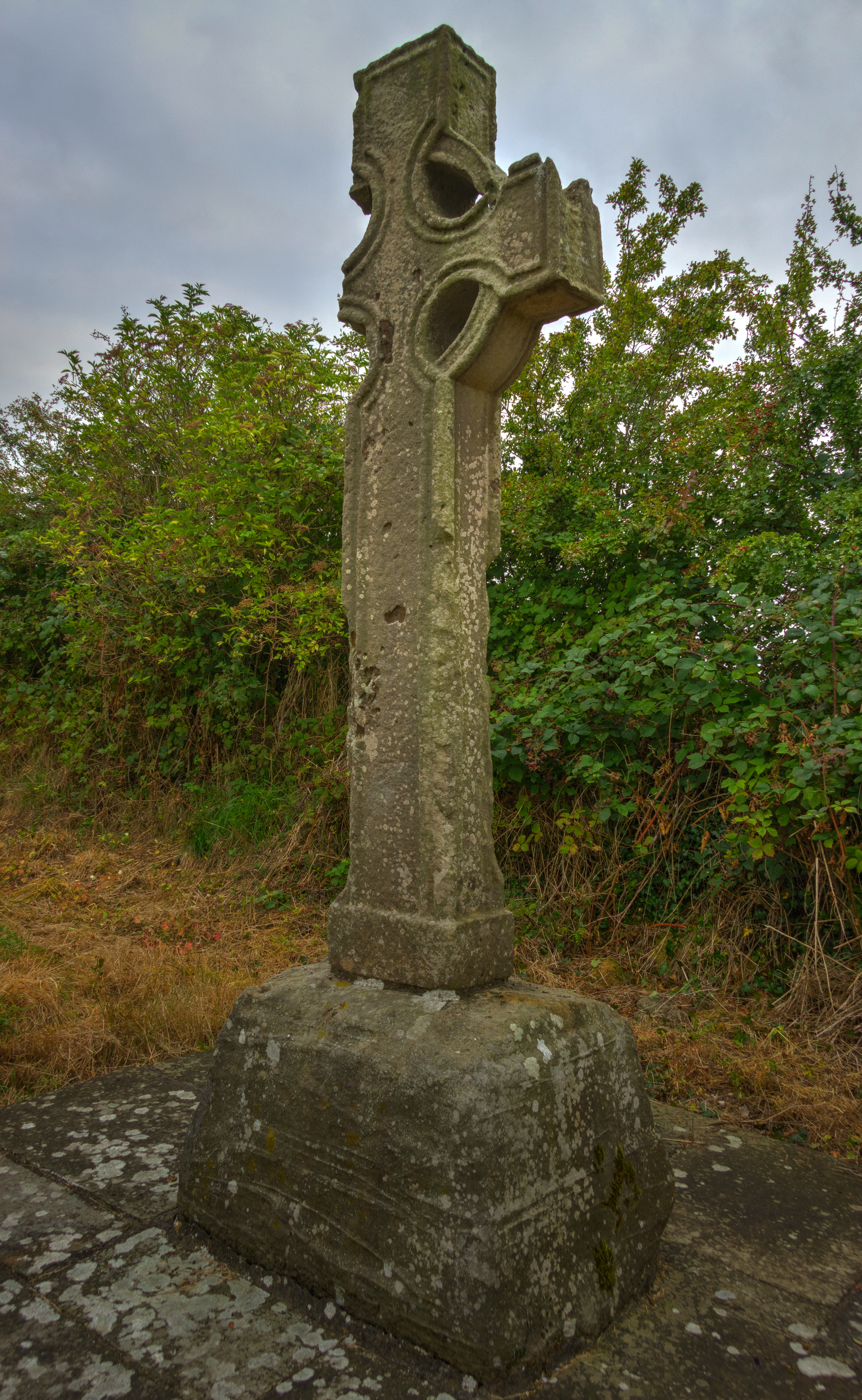
West Cross

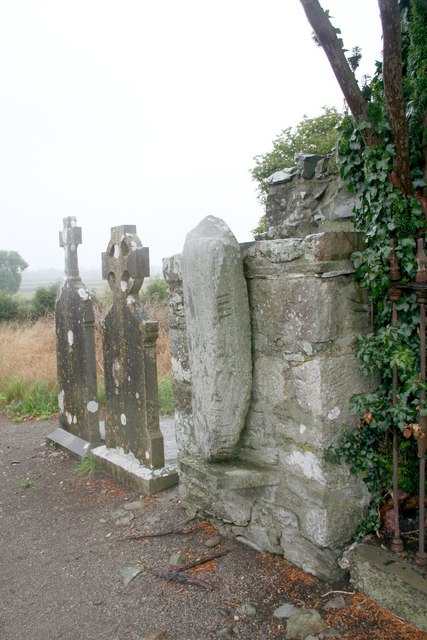
Ogham stone

=== Ogham stone ===
An Ogham stone present reads COVAGNI MAQI MUCOLI LUGINI, meaning "Cuana son of the people of Luigni." The Luigni were noted in Meath from the 8th century onward, and give their name to the barony of Lune.
