= Dunmoe Castle =

- Caisleán Dhún Mó (Irish)
- Dunmow Castle
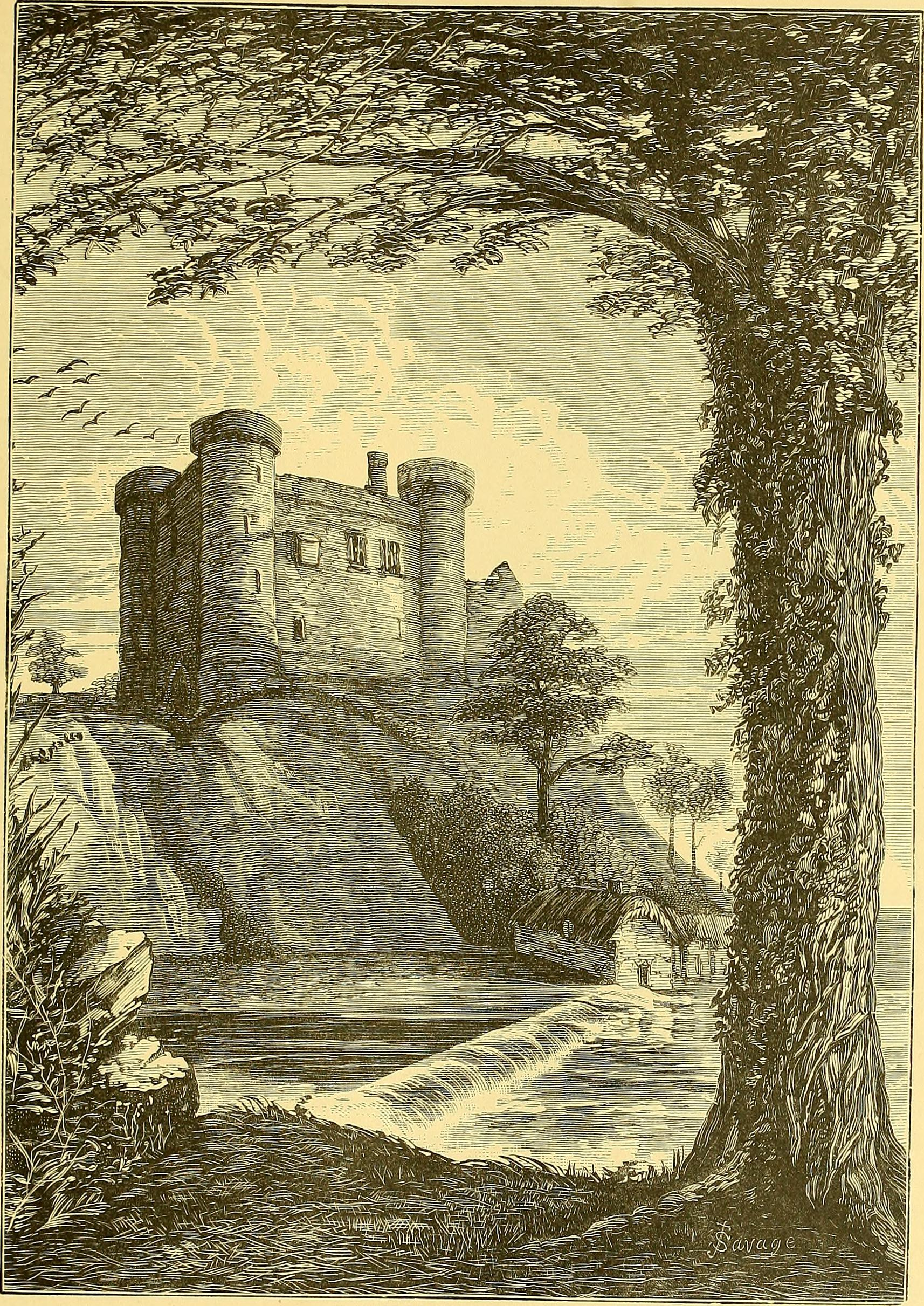
- Illustration from Picturesque Ireland (1885)

- Location within Ireland
- 53.674094°N 6.636899°W
- Type: Castle
- Location: Dunmoe, Navan, County Meath, Ireland

History
- Built: mid-15th century

Site notes
- Area: Boyne Valley
- Architect: Anglo-Norman

National monument of Ireland
- Official name: Dunmoe Castle
- Reference no.: 482

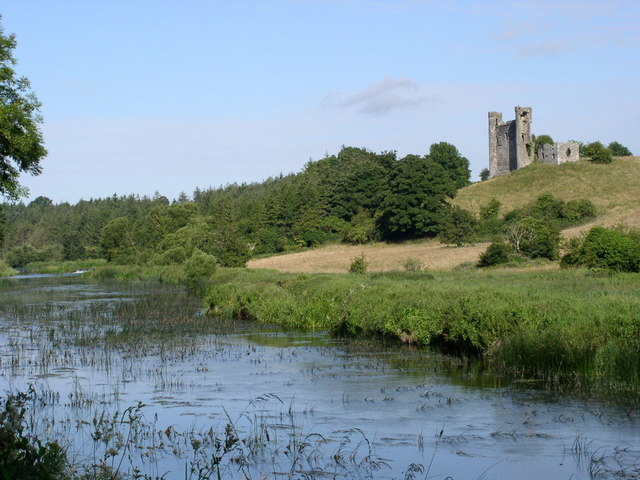
View of Dunmoe Castle overlooking the Boyne.

Dunmoe Castle (Irish: Caisleán Dhún Mó) is a castle and National Monument located near Navan, Ireland.

== Location ==
Dunmoe Castle is located on the northwest bank of the Boyne, 4 km (2.5 mi) northeast of Navan.

== History ==
The placename is probably derived from Irish Dún mBó, "hillfort of cattle," suggesting that a Gaelic Irish fort was on this site before the later castle. The castle was built for the D'Arcy family in the mid-15th century and marked the western edge of The Pale. According to the Civil Survey (1654–6) Thomas Darcy owned the entire parish and on the premises there was ‘a Castle, a Church, a Mill, an Orchard and a fishing weare’.

During the Cromwellian conquest of Ireland in 1649 the Castle was fired upon from the south bank by passing troops on their way from Drogheda to Athboy, but avoided any real damage.

According to legend, the occupant, George d'Arcy, entertained King James on the night before the Battle of the Boyne (1690) and King William the day after, inspiring the couplet: "Who will be king, I do not know, But I'll be d'Arcy of Dunmoe."

The two-storey building attached to the east may be an 18th-century addition. A drawing of 1795 shows the castle intact. It was burned down during the Irish Rebellion of 1798. Now only the two southern towers and some walls remain.

== Building ==
The castle is an Anglo-Norman donjon (keep). It was originally a rectangle (15 × 10 m, 16 × 11 yds) with a tower at each corner. Two of these towers have crumbled, as has the entire back part of the castle.

The ground floor is buried but was vaulted and had a loft and arrowslits on the south wall. The newel stairs in the southwest tower have a gun loop. A nearby chapel, by a church dedicated to Saint Catherine, contains the tombs of the D'Arcys.
