= Carrickdexter Cross =

Monument in County Meath, Ireland

- Cros Charraig an Dísirt (Irish)
- Baronstown Cross
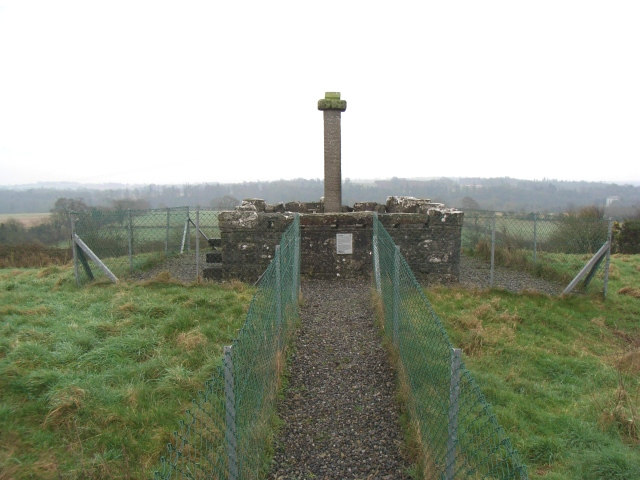

- Location within Ireland
- 53.702968°N 6.582497°W
- Type: Wayside cross
- Location: Carrickdexter, Slane, County Meath, Ireland

History
- Built: c. 1607

Designations
- Designation: National Monument

Carrickdexter Cross is a wayside cross and National Monument located in County Meath, Ireland.

== Location ==
Carrickdexter Cross is located 3 kilometres (1.9 mi) southwest of the Hill of Slane.
