= Mountfortescue Hillfort =

Hillfort in County Meath, Ireland

- Ráth Chnoc Réisc (Irish)
- Location within Ireland
- 53°45′43″N 6°34′34″W
- Type: Tumulus, Hillfort
- Periods: Middle Ages
- Location: Mountfortescue, County Meath, Ireland

History
- Built: AD 500–1000

Site notes
- Material: Earth
- Area: 2.12 hectares (5.2 acres) (ringfort)
- Diameter: 164 metres (179 yd) (ringfort)

Designations
- Designation: National Monument

Mountfortescue Hillfort is a National Monument consisting of a hillfort with tumuli located in County Meath, Ireland.

== Location ==
Mountfortescue Hillfort is located about 5 kilometres (3.1 mi) north of Slane Castle and overlooks the Delvin River, a Boyne tributary. It is 900 m (0.56 mi) southeast of Slieve Breagh.

== Description ==
A hillfort is a circular area surrounding a hilltop tumulus (barrow mound), defined by an earthen bank with an external ditch.

The Ordnance Survey records a circular enclosure (about 180 yards in diameter) with a mound at the Mountfortescue site. The archaeological monument consists of Mountfortescue Ringditch, Tumulus & Hillfort. The barrow cemetery at Slieve Breagh and excavation of a Neolithic settlement suggest the area had been a scene of activity throughout prehistory.
