= St. John's Priory, Trim =

- Prióireacht Naomh Eoin
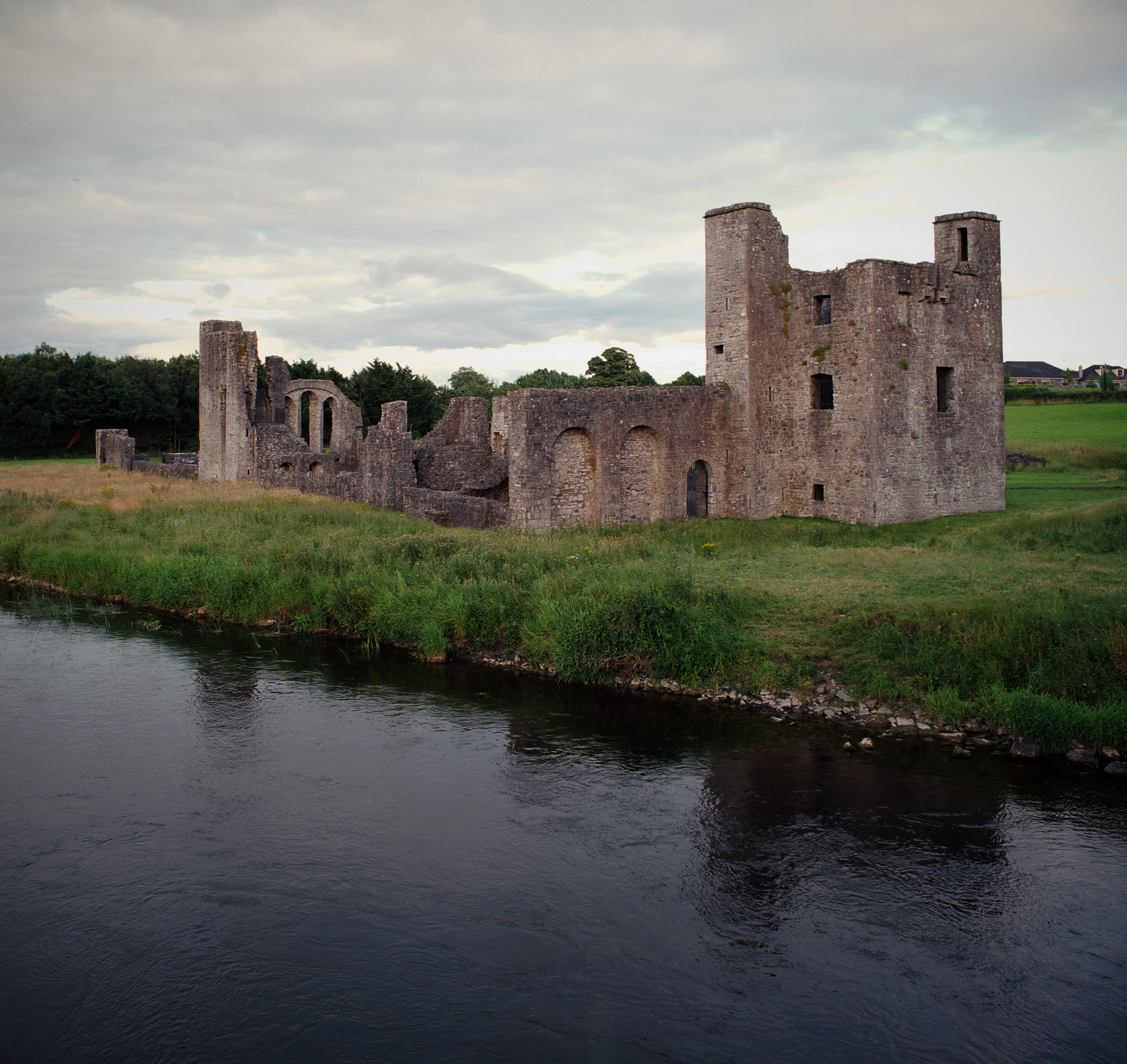

- Location within Ireland
- Interactive map of St. John's Priory, Trim

Monastery information
- Other names: Priory and Hospital of St John the Baptist
- Order: Crutched Friars
- Established: c. 1202
- Disestablished: 1540
- Diocese: Meath

People
- Founder: Simon Rochfort

Architecture
- Status: Inactive
- Heritage designation

National monument of Ireland
- Official name: Newtown Trim
- Reference no.: 553
- Style: Norman

Site
- Location: Saint Johns, Trim, County Meath
- Coordinates: 53.555216°N 6.768121°W
- Visible remains: church, tower, defensive wall
- Public access: yes

St. John's Priory is a medieval priory and hospital and National Monument located near Trim, County Meath, Ireland.

== Location ==
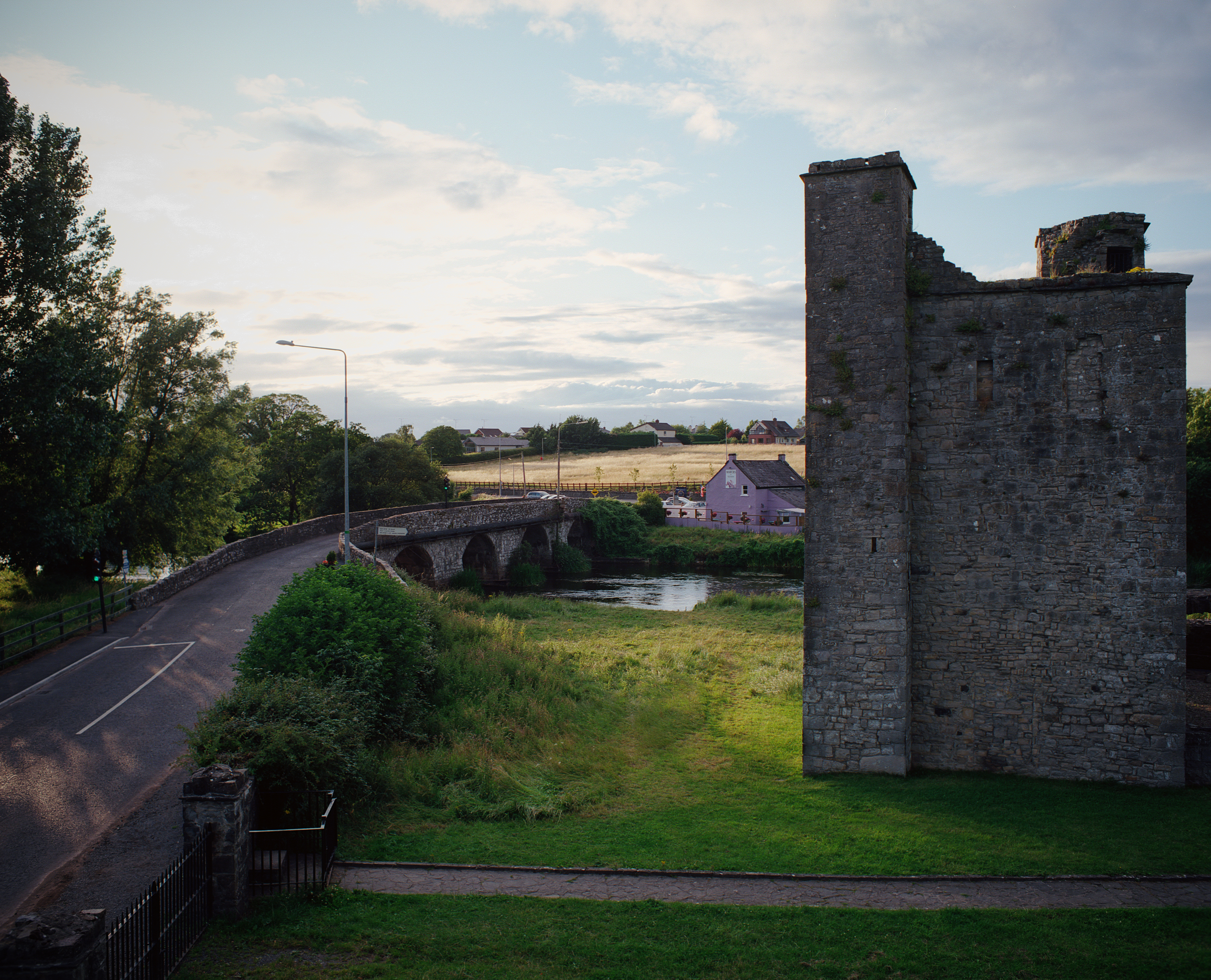
View of the main tower looking over Newtown Bridge and the Boyne.

St. John's Priory is located about 1.6 km (1 mile) east of Trim town centre, on the south bank of the Boyne. Newtown Abbey lies immediately to the northwest, across the river.

== History ==
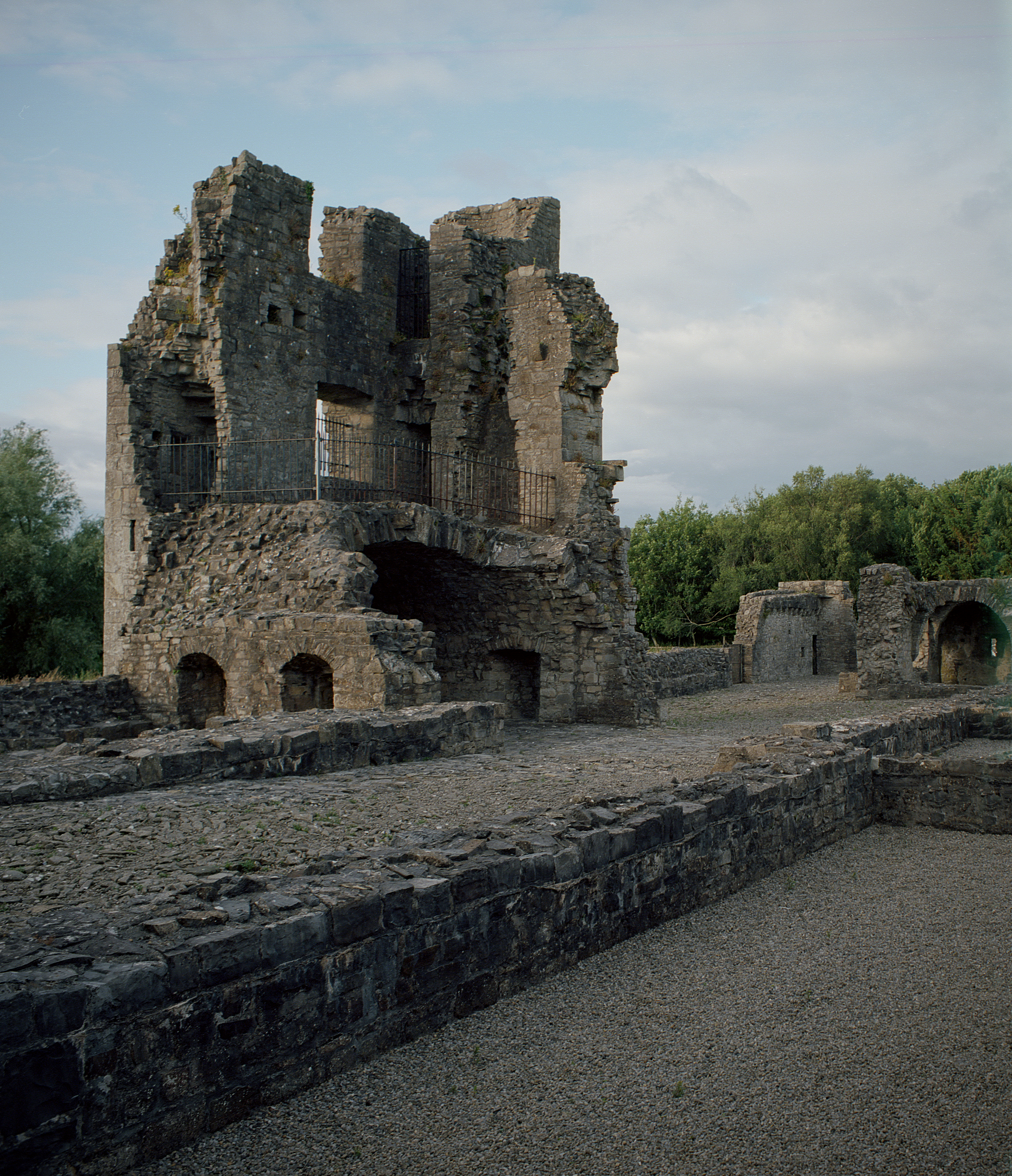
One of the main buildings of the priory.

St. John's Priory was established by Simon Rochfort, Bishop of Meath, c. 1202 for the Crutched Friars. The first record of the priory is in 1281 when there was a grant of alms from the manor of "Magathtreth."

In 1513 Edmund Dillon was prior of this monastery; his brother Thomas Dillon was prior of Saints Peter and Paul's at the time. Their brother Robert was granted the priory at the 1540 Dissolution of the Monasteries. At the time the priory consisted of a church, two towers, a hall, storehouse, kitchen, brewhouse, two granaries, a dovecote and a haggard (stackyard). There were 90 acres (36 ha) of arable land near the Boyne, land and a mill on the Leinster Blackwater, a castle and land at Longwood, County Meath and various other lands in the county.

He later sold it to the Ashe family. After they abandoned it, it was supposedly granted to the Catholic Bishop of Meath. After the Battle of the Boyne (1690) the building was granted to one of King William's men. According to one story, on his first night in the holy spot he saw a "most horrid vision" and at dawn he rode away never to return.

The site was excavated by David Sweetman in 1984, who found the remains of a 15th-century rood screen and a doorway in the gable end of the nave.

== Buildings ==
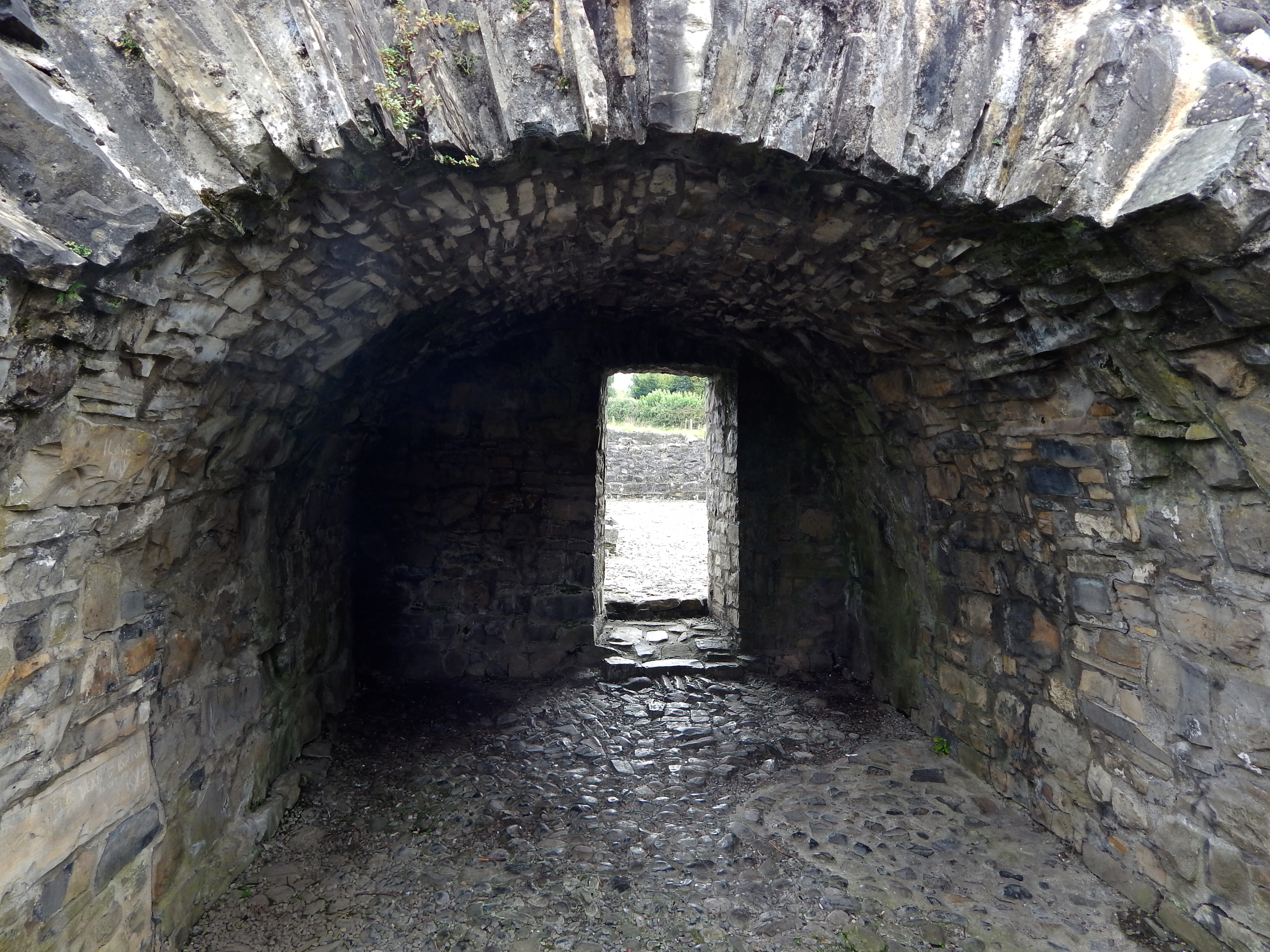
Small vaulted room inside the main building of St John's.

The hospitals of the Crutched Friars were built similar to all Canons Regular monasteries, but with special facilities for caring for the sick. One of the buildings shows the remains of a chute disposing of waste material into the river.

Among the remains is a church with nave and chancel and a large three-light window in the east wall, see above. Part of a long two-storey building remains, as does a 15th–16th century enclosing wall with a corner turret. There is also a 15th-century three-storey tower which is vaulted above ground level and forms part of the defensive wall.
