= Cannistown Church =

- Ardsallagh Church; Kennastown Church
- Teampall Bhaile Cheana
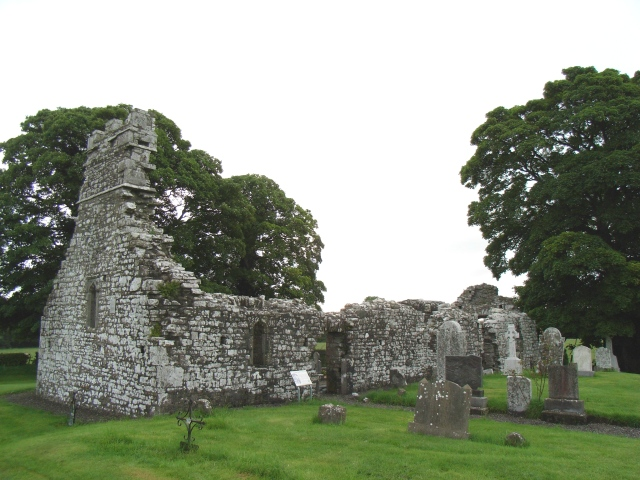

- Location within Ireland
- 53.618516°N 6.667914°W
- Location: Ardsallagh, Navan, County Meath
- Country: Ireland
- Denomination: Pre-Reformation Catholic

History
- Dedication: Brigit of Kildare

Architecture
- Functional status: Ruins
- Heritage designation

National monument of Ireland
- Official name: Cannistown Church
- Reference no.: 239
- Style: Anglo-Norman, Gothic
- Years built: 12th–15th century
- Groundbreaking: 12 century
- Completed: 15th century
- Closed: 16th century

Specifications
- Length: 22.85 m (75.0 ft)
- Width: 7.25 m (23.8 ft)
- Height: 7 m (23 ft)
- Materials: sandstone, mortar, Old Red Sandstone

Administration
- Diocese: Meath

Cannistown Church is a medieval church and National Monument in County Meath, Ireland.

== Location ==
Cannistown Church is located on the west bank of the Boyne, 4 km (2.5 mi) south of Navan. The Hill of Tara lies 5.8 km (3.6 mi) to the southeast.

== History ==
Ardsallagh (Irish árd saileach, "height of willows") is believed to be on the site of an early Christian monastery founded by Finnian of Clonard in the sixth century, known by various names: Escair-Branain (Brenan's ridge) Ard-bren-n Domnuich (Height of Brenan's church) or Airdleac (High stone). One hagiography claims that Saint Senach was educated by Finnian at Ardsallagh.

Cannistown Church, dedicated to Brigit of Kildare, was probably built in the 12th century by the de Angulo / Nangle family, the Anglo-Normans to whom Cannistown was granted by Hugh de Lacy, Lord of Meath. It was the parish church from the 13th century onward, and was rebuilt in the 15th/16th century, but some original features remain, most notably the chancel. A church at "Ardsalach" is listed in the ecclesiastical taxation (1302–06) of Pope Nicholas IV. The church was closed around the time of the Reformation: in 1612, George Montgomery, Church of Ireland Bishop of Meath, described it as "in ruins."

== Church ==
The church consists of a nave and chancel with high gables, and the remains of a bell-gable in the west. The arch leading into the chancel is of particular interest: Carved stones on each side of the arch show three dogs attacking an otter or fox, and another carving of three men, possibly depicting the Arrest of Jesus. There is a single lancet window and an ambry (recess for storing sacred vessels and vestments) at ground level on the north wall and a surviving lancet and piscina at the east end of the south wall. There is a small bullaun stone in the nave.
