= Loughbracken Fort =

Medieval fort in County Meath, Ireland

Loughbrackan Fort
- Ráth Loch Breacáin (Irish)
- Loughbracken Fort, Loughbrackan Mound
- Location within Ireland
- 53°50′09″N 6°40′38″W
- Type: Motte
- Location: Loughbrackan, County Meath, Ireland

History
- Built: late 12th, early 13th century AD

Site notes
- Material: earth
- Height: 3 metres (9.8 ft)
- Area: 314 square metres (0.078 acres)
- Diameter: 20 metres (22 yd)
- Circumference: 63 metres (69 yd)

Designations
- Designation: National Monument

Loughbracken Fort is a motte and National Monument located in County Meath, Ireland.

== Location ==
Loughbracken Fort is located to the west of Lough Bracken, and about 2.2 kilometres (1.4 mi) southwest of Drumconrath.

== Description ==
Loughbracken Fort is a circular flat-topped mound defined by a fosse. It is owned by the Office of Public Works. It dates to after the Norman conquest of Ireland (late 12th or 13th centuries).
