= Ardmulchan Passage Tomb =

Passage grave in County Meath, Ireland

- Tuama Pasáiste Ard Maolchon (Irish)
- Location within Ireland
- 53.6825°N 6.60988°W
- Type: passage grave
- Location: Ardmulchan, Navan, County Meath, Ireland

History
- Built: c. 3000–2500 BC

Site notes
- Elevation: 37 m (121 ft)
- Area: Boyne Valley

National monument of Ireland
- Official name: Ardmulchan Passage Tomb
- Reference no.: 546

Ardmulchan Passage Tomb is a passage grave and National Monument located in County Meath, Ireland.

== Location ==
Ardmulchan Passage Tomb is located 5.6 km (3.5 mi) northeast of Navan, on the southeast bank of the River Boyne, next to Broadboyne Bridge.

== History ==
Ardmulchan Passage Tomb dates to 3000–2500 BC.

== Description ==
Two carved stones bearing megalithic art (two "picked signs" and one "incised sign") were found in 1974 during the construction of a house. A mound of earth nearby may be the remains of a passage grave.
