= Calliaghstown Well =

Holy well in Ireland

- Tobar Cholm Cille (Irish)
- St. Columbkille's Well
- Location within Ireland
- 53.671492°N 6.329396°W
- Type: holy well
- Location: Calliaghstown, Julianstown, County Meath

Site notes
- Elevation: 28 m (92 ft)

National monument of Ireland
- Official name: Calliaghstown Well
- Reference no.: 637

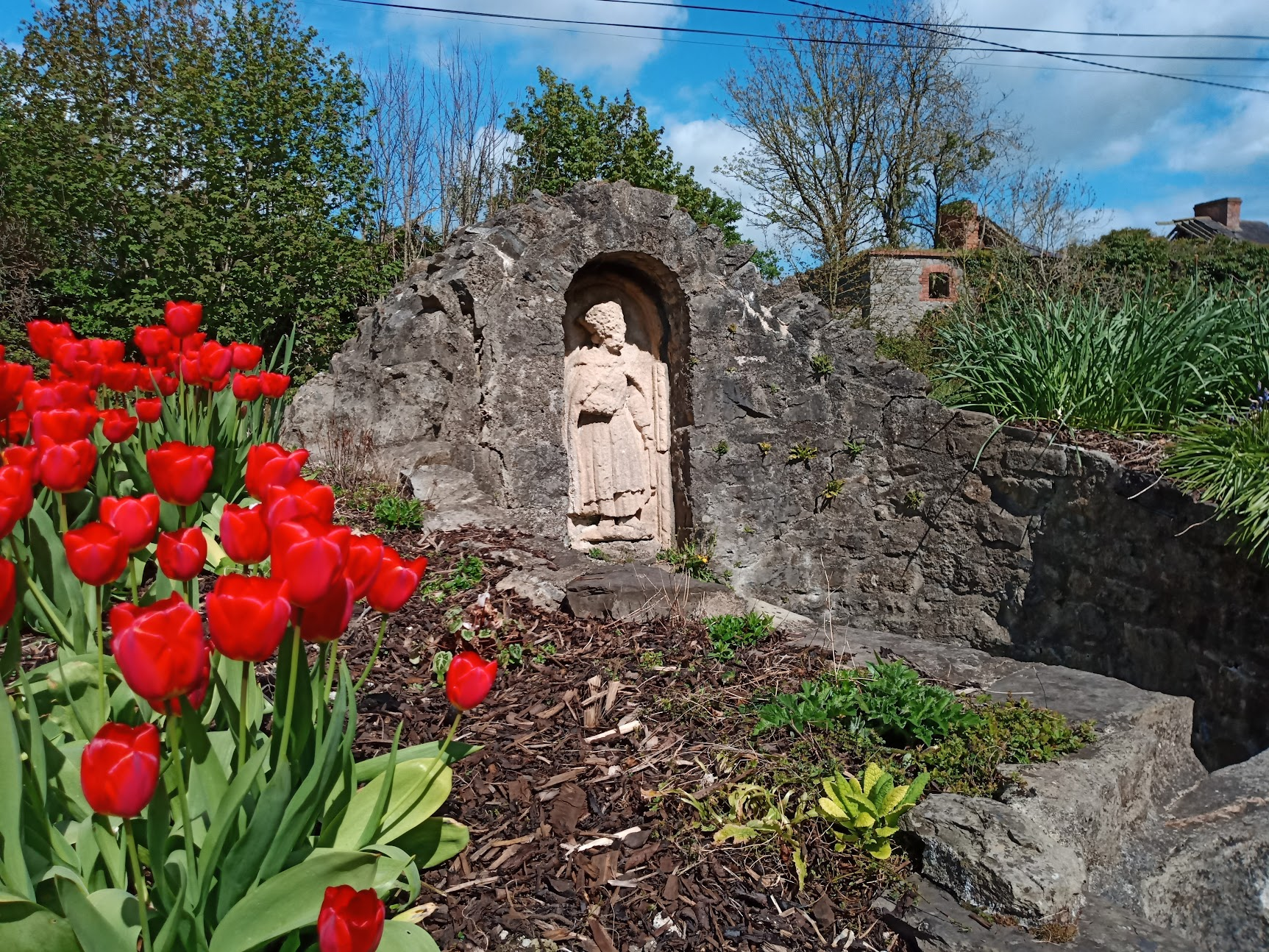
Calliaghstown Well

Calliaghstown Well, also called St. Columbkille's Well, is a holy well and National Monument located in County Meath, Ireland.

== Location ==
Calliaghstown Well is located beside a road just off the R150, 4.5 km (2.8 mi) south of Drogheda and the River Boyne and 5 km (3.1 mi) west of Julianstown.

== History and description ==
The well was a traditional site of pilgrimage for locals, and a pattern took place there each year on 9 June. A statue, erected perhaps in the mid-18th century, is called St Colm Cille, although with a mantle and crown it does not resemble traditional depictions of Columba/Colm Cille, who is usually depicted in a monk's habit (although he was of a royal family).

The statue is 1 m (3 ft 3 in) tall and composed of oolitic limestone, similar to Bath stone.
