= Realtogue Fort =

- Ráth Réaltóige (Irish)
- Realtoge Fort
- Location within Ireland
- 53°38′33″N 6°35′00″W
- Type: Ringfort
- Periods: Middle Ages
- Location: Realtogue, Navan; County Meath, Ireland

History
- Built: AD 500–1000

Site notes
- Material: Earth
- Area: 0.158 hectares (0.39 acres)
- Circumference: 142 metres (466 ft)

Designations
- Designation: National Monument

Realtogue Fort is a ringfort (rath) and National Monument located in County Meath, Ireland.

== Location ==
Realtogue ringfort is located about 3.5 km (2 miles) northwest of Kentstown and 1.6 km (1 mile) north of the River Nanny, a Boyne tributary. A holy well (Tobermurry) lies

== Description ==
The ringfort is an oval, measuring 49 metres (161 ft) NW–SE. There is a house site against the inner bank at the east.
