= Robertstown Fort =

Ringfort and national monument in County Meath, Ireland

- Ráth Bhaile Riobaird (Irish)
- Location within Ireland
- 53.794130°N 6.820141°W
- Type: Ringfort
- Periods: Middle Ages
- Location: Robertstown, Kilbeg; County Meath, Ireland

History
- Built: AD 500–1000

Site notes
- Material: earth
- Area: 855 square metres (0.211 acres)
- Diameter: 33 metres (108 ft)
- Circumference: 103 metres (338 ft)

Designations
- Designation: National Monument

Robertstown Fort is a ringfort (rath) and National Monument located in County Meath, Ireland.

== Location ==
Robertstown ringfort is located about 4.5 kilometres (2.8 mi) east of Moynalty and 1.3 kilometres (1,400 yd) north of the River Owenroe, a Boyne tributary.
