= List of national monuments in County Louth =

The Irish state has officially approved the following list of national monuments in County Louth. In the Republic of Ireland, a structure or site may be deemed to be a "national monument", and therefore worthy of state protection, if it is of national importance. If the land adjoining the monument is essential to protect it, this land may also be protected.

== National Monuments ==
NM#	Monument name	Description	Image	Townland	Location
326	Aghnaskeagh Cairns	Two Cairns		Aghnaskeagh	54°03′39″N 6°21′28″W
LH018-040	Athclare Castle	Castle		Athclare	53°48′55″N 6°23′52″W
480	Mansfieldstown Church	Church		Bawn	53°53′49″N 6°26′45″W
249	Carlingford Castle	Castle		Carlingford	54°02′36″N 6°11′13″W
242	The Mint	Urban Tower House		Carlingford	54°02′24″N 6°11′11″W
388	Dun Dealgan	Motte		Castletown	54°00′50″N 6°25′49″W
526	Donaghmore Souterrain	Souterrain		Donaghmore	54°00′11″N 6°27′36″W
511	St. Laurence's Gate	Town Gate		Drogheda	53°42′57″N 6°20′49″W
92	Dromiskin	Church & Round Tower		Dromiskin	53°55′20″N 6°23′54″W
144	Greenmount motte	Motte		Greenmount	53°52′41″N 6°23′08″W
623	Carlingford Abbey	Friary (Dominican)		Carlingford	54°02′17″N 6°11′04″W
579	Lisnaran Fort	Ringfort		Linns	53°52′58″N 6°20′49″W
93	Mellifont Abbey	Abbey (Cistercian)		Drogheda	53°44′33″N 6°27′59″W
94	Monasterboice	High crosses, churches & round tower		Monasterboice	53°46′39″N 6°25′05″W
312	St. Mochta's House	Church		Priorstate	53°57′12″N 6°32′44″W
476	Proleek Dolmen	Portal Tomb & wedge Tomb		Proleek	54°02′14″N 6°20′54″W
474	Clochafarmore	Standing Stone		Rathiddy	53°58′28″N 6°27′57″W
597	Ravensdale Park	Cairn		Ravensdale Park	54°04′45″N 6°19′18″W
460	Castleroche Castle	Castle		Dundalk	54°02′47″N 6°29′18″W
562	Rockmarshall Court Tomb	Court Tomb		Annaloughan	54°00′33″N 6°17′05″W
298	Roodstown Castle	Castle		Roodstown	53°52′21″N 6°29′12″W
178	Termonfeckin Castle	Castle		Termonfeckin	53°45′43″N 6°16′01″W
529	Townleyhall passage grave	Passage Tomb		Townleyhall	53°43′16″N 6°27′05″W

== Sources ==
- National Monuments in County Louth
