= Donaghmore =

Donaghmore, Donoughmore or Domhnach Mór (Irish "large church") may refer to:

Northern Ireland, UK

- Donaghmore, County Down, a parish and hamlet
- Donaghmore, County Tyrone, a village
- Dunnamore, County Tyrone, a village and townland (also spelt Donamore/Dunamore)

Republic of Ireland

- Donaghmore, County Cork, a parish, see Barretts (barony)
- Donaghmore, County Donegal, a parish
- Donaghmore, County Kildare, a civil parish
  - including Grangewilliam a monastic settlement also known as Donaghmore or Domhnach Mór
- Donaghmore, County Laois
- Donaghmore, County Louth
  - Donaghmore Souterrain
- Donaghmore, County Meath
- Donaghmore, County Tipperary
- Donaghmore, County Wicklow
- Ballyragget, County Kilkenny, also known as Donaghmore/Donoughmore
