= Triple pipes =

Musical instrument

This article focuses on the Gaelic-tradition instrument. For the Sardinian instrument see launeddas.

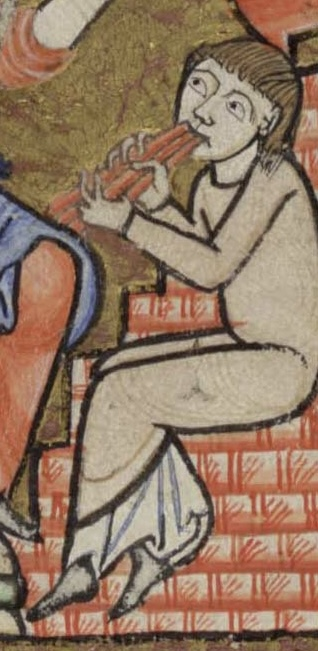
Triple pipes, circa 1170 A.D. in the Hunterian Psalter, Glasgow University Library.

Triple pipes are reedpipes used in Europe, played in a set of three (two chanters with fingerholes and one drone). Once played in the medieval era in Ireland, Scotland, England, France and Spain (as evidenced in artwork), they survive mainly today in the traditions of Sardinia as the launeddas.

The instruments fit into a wide family of single-reed reedpipes, which includes the ancient Greek aulos and ancient Egyptian memet, and today includes the Egyptian arghul, Sardinian launeddas, Balkan diplica, Greek/Turkish zummara, Iranian dozaleh, Iraqi mijwiz, Basque/Spanish alboka/albogue, and Berber zamar.

== Gaelic tradition ==
No original instruments from the Gaelic tradition are known to exist today. Musicians have begun to revive the instrument, borrowing from the launeddas playing traditions in Sardinia, which did not go extinct.

Triple pipes, Cumbrian pipes or the cuisle were woodwind musical instruments of medieval Celts, featured in medieval artwork of the Irish, and Scottish and English peoples during the 8th to 12th centuries. They were possibly "precursors" to Irish and English bagpipes and functioned as an organ for the Irish Celtic Church.

Images of the instrument survive in Scotland and Ireland in sculptured stone, including the Cross of Scriptures at Clonmacnoise, Ireland (circa 900 A.D.), a Picto-Scottish relief carving at Lethendy, Perthshire, Scotland (10th century A.D.), Muiredach's High Cross at Monasterboice, Ireland (9th-10th century A.D.), one at Ardchattan Priory, Argyll, Scotland (9th century), one on the Saint Martin's Cross at Iona Abbey (8th century A.D.), an example at St John's, Hawkchurch, Devon, England (circa 1200), and an example in Westminster Abbey, London (13th century).

Besides the sculptures, the instrument was also portrayed in a miniature painting in the Hunterian Psalter, York, England (circa 12th century A.D.), the Cantigas de Santa Maria Codex of the Musicians (circa 1280), and the English Bestiary at the Oxford, Bodleian Library (12th century).

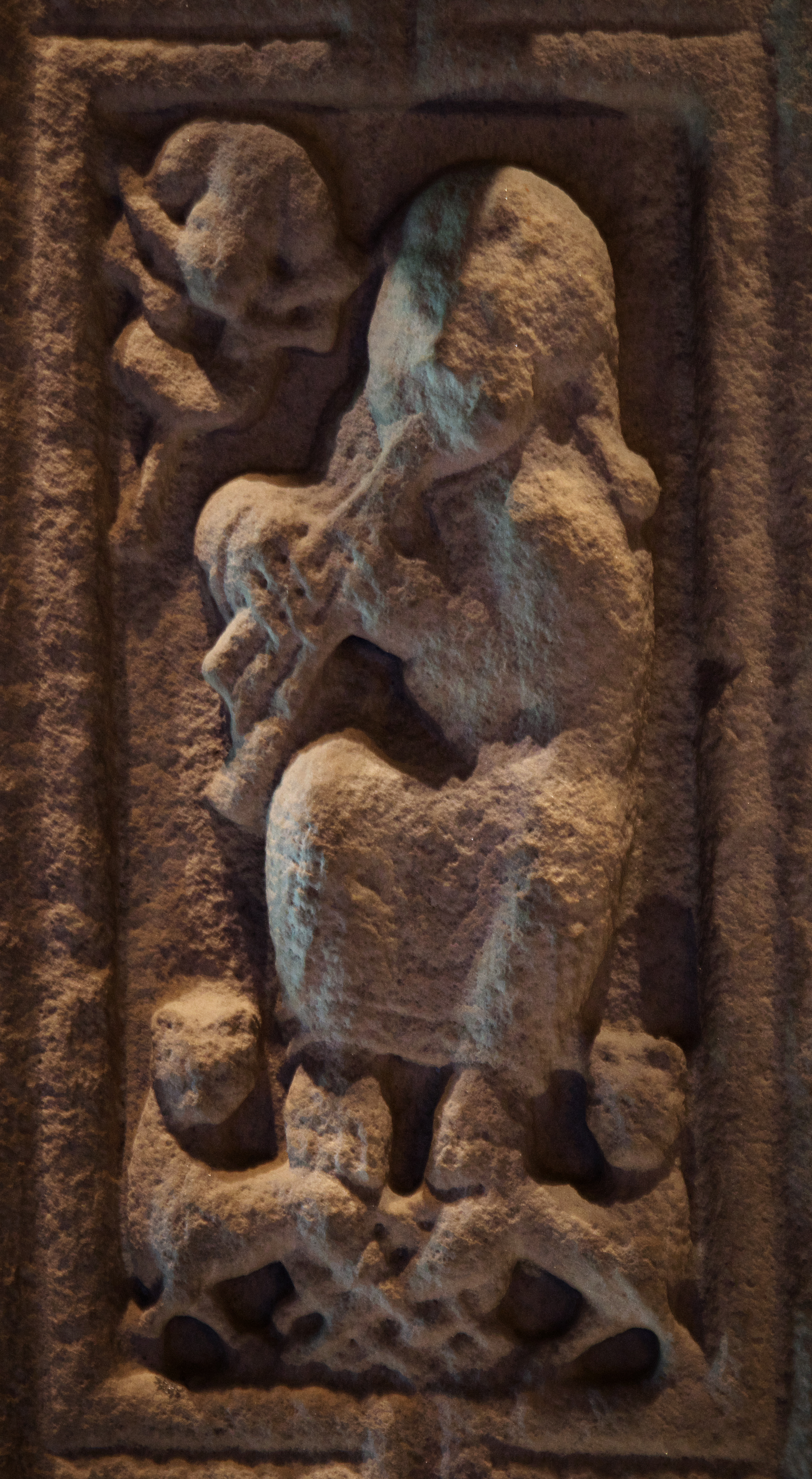
A musician playing triple pipes on the Cross of Scriptures at Clonmacnoise, circa 900 A.D.

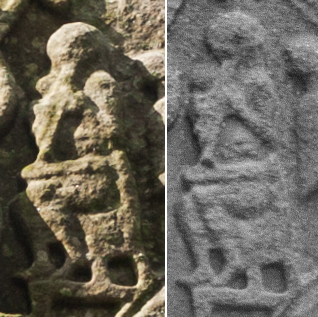
Circa 922 A.D., Ireland. Triple pipes from the head of Muiredach's High Cross (Monasterboice South Cross, East Face). Two images shown for detail.

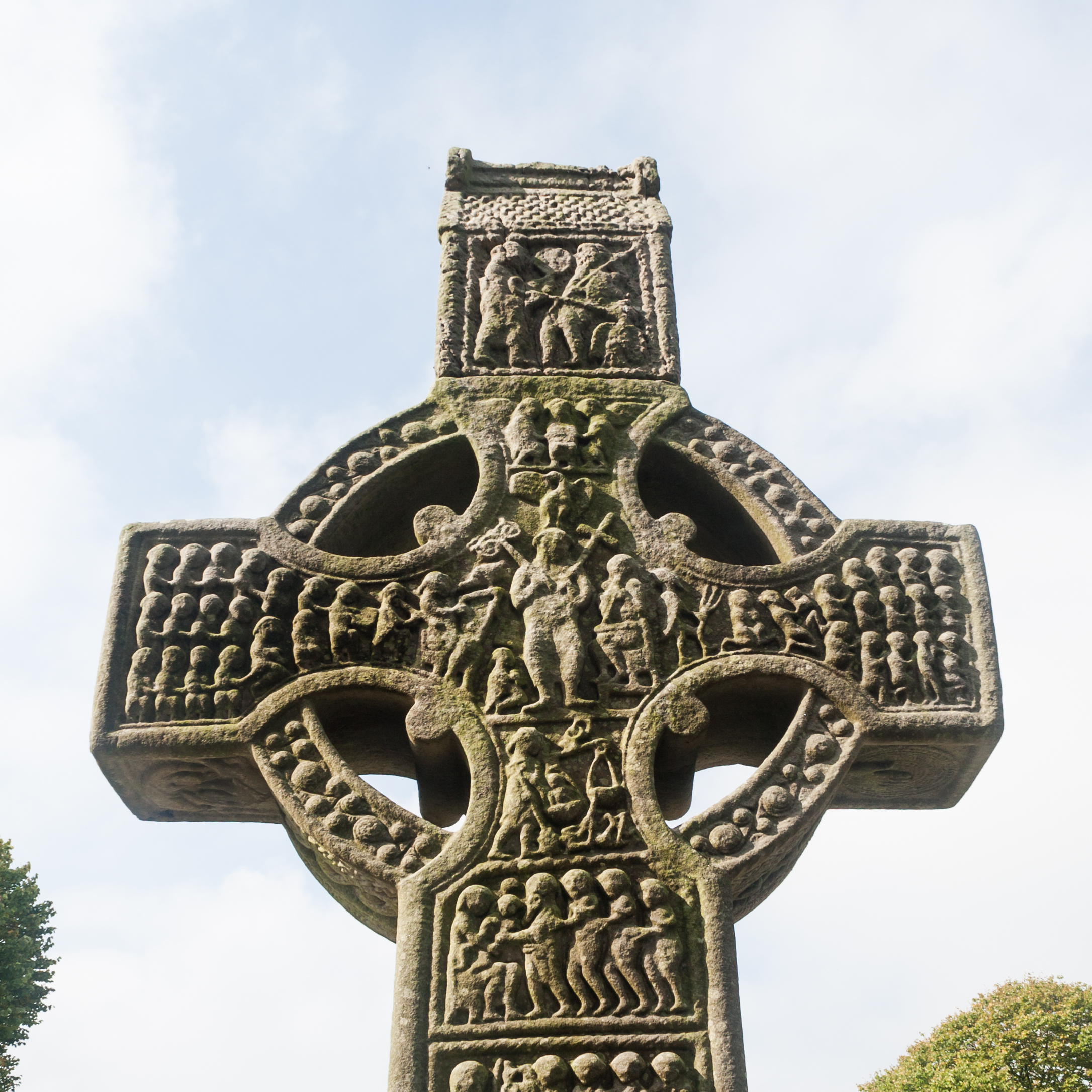
Circa 922 A.D., Ireland. Muiredach's High Cross: Christ (center), David plays the harp (left) with a trumpet and singers behind him; a man plays the triple pipes (right) with a devil driving away condemned souls behind him.

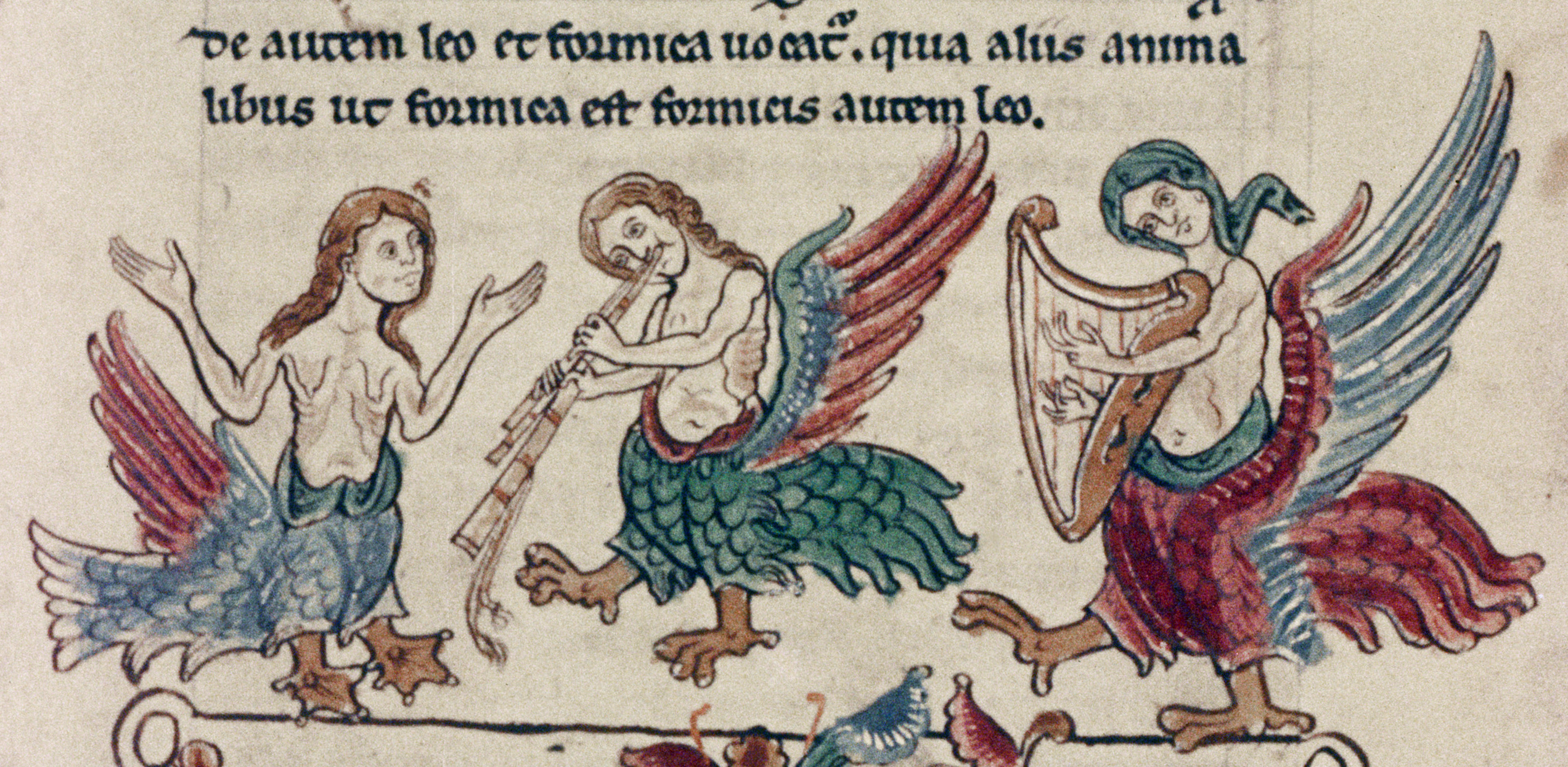
13th century, England. Harpies with triple pipes and harp, Bodleian-Library-MS-Bodl-602, folio 10r.

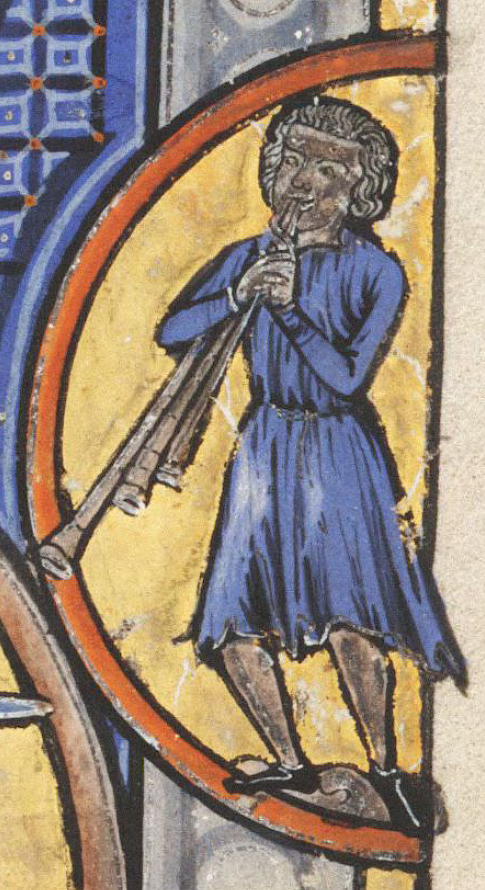
Circa 1225-1240, France. Triple pipes from the Lewis Psalter, Lewis E 185, folio 1v. The instrument does not appear to have fingerholes.

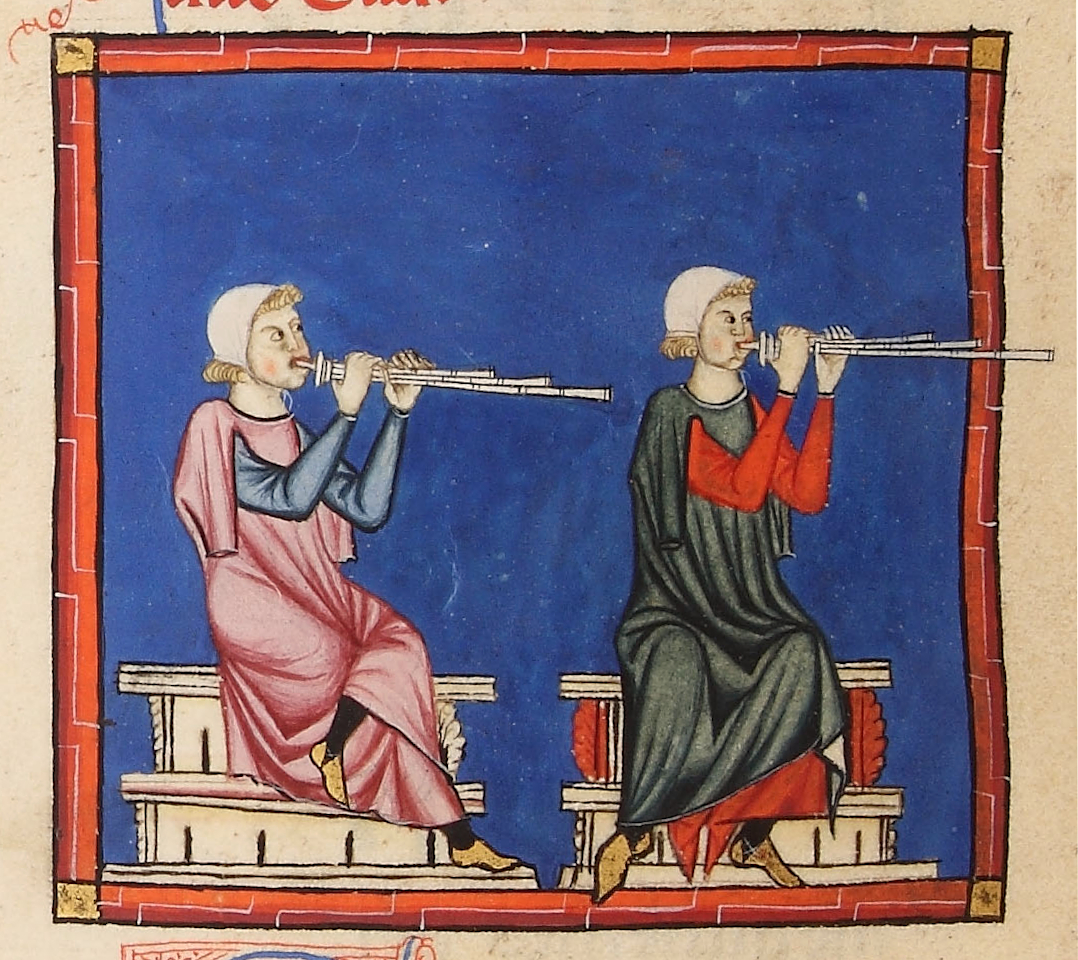
Circa 1280 A.D., Spain. Triple pipe illustrated in the Cantigas de Santa Maria, Codex of the musicians. Spain was a mixing ground with Hispano-Celtic, Mediterranean and North African or Muslim traditions.

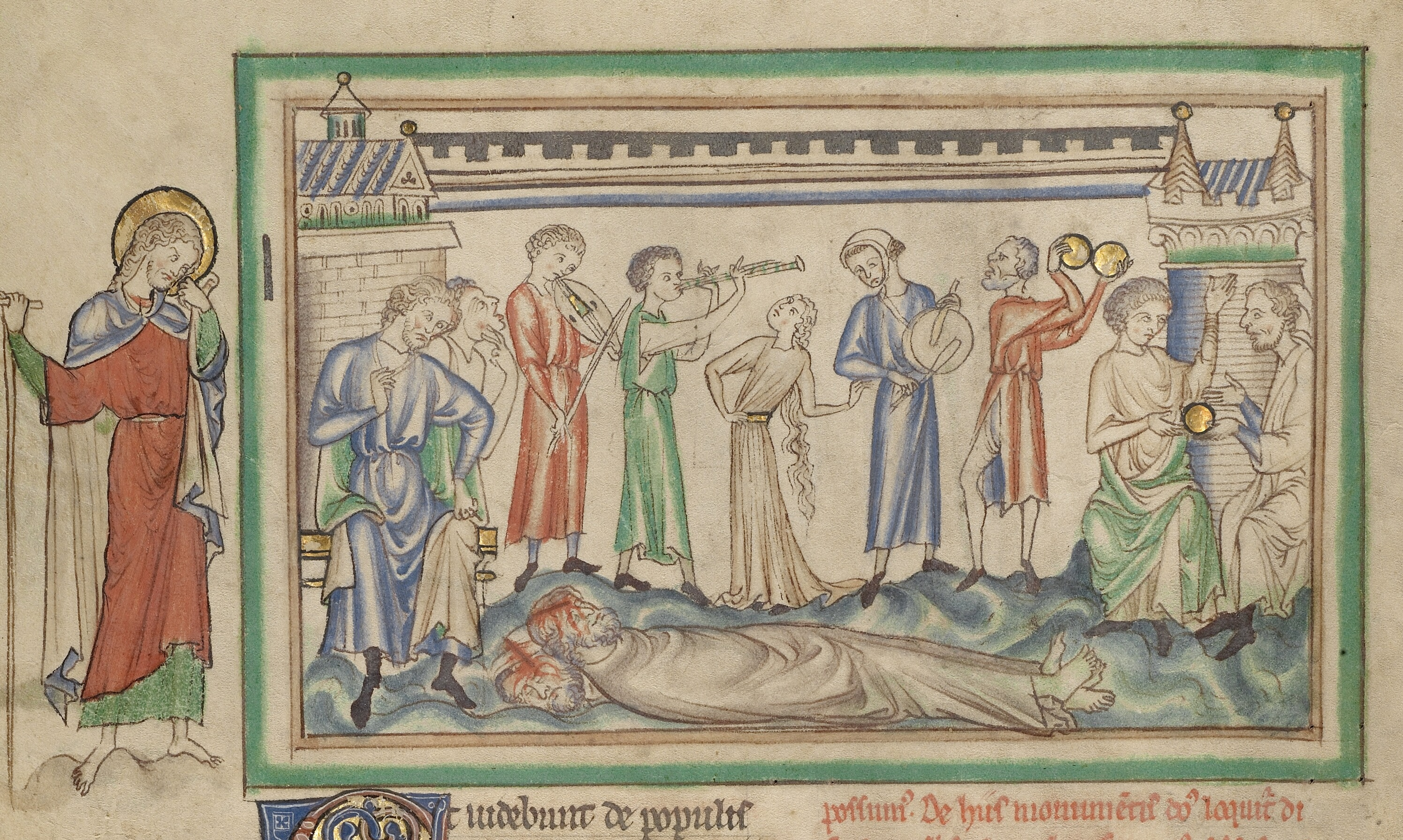
Circa 1255-1260 A.D., England. Saint John looks on a scene, where people celebrate with music and dance the death of the Two witnesses. From the left, vielle, triple pipes, tabor and cymbals.

== The instrument ==
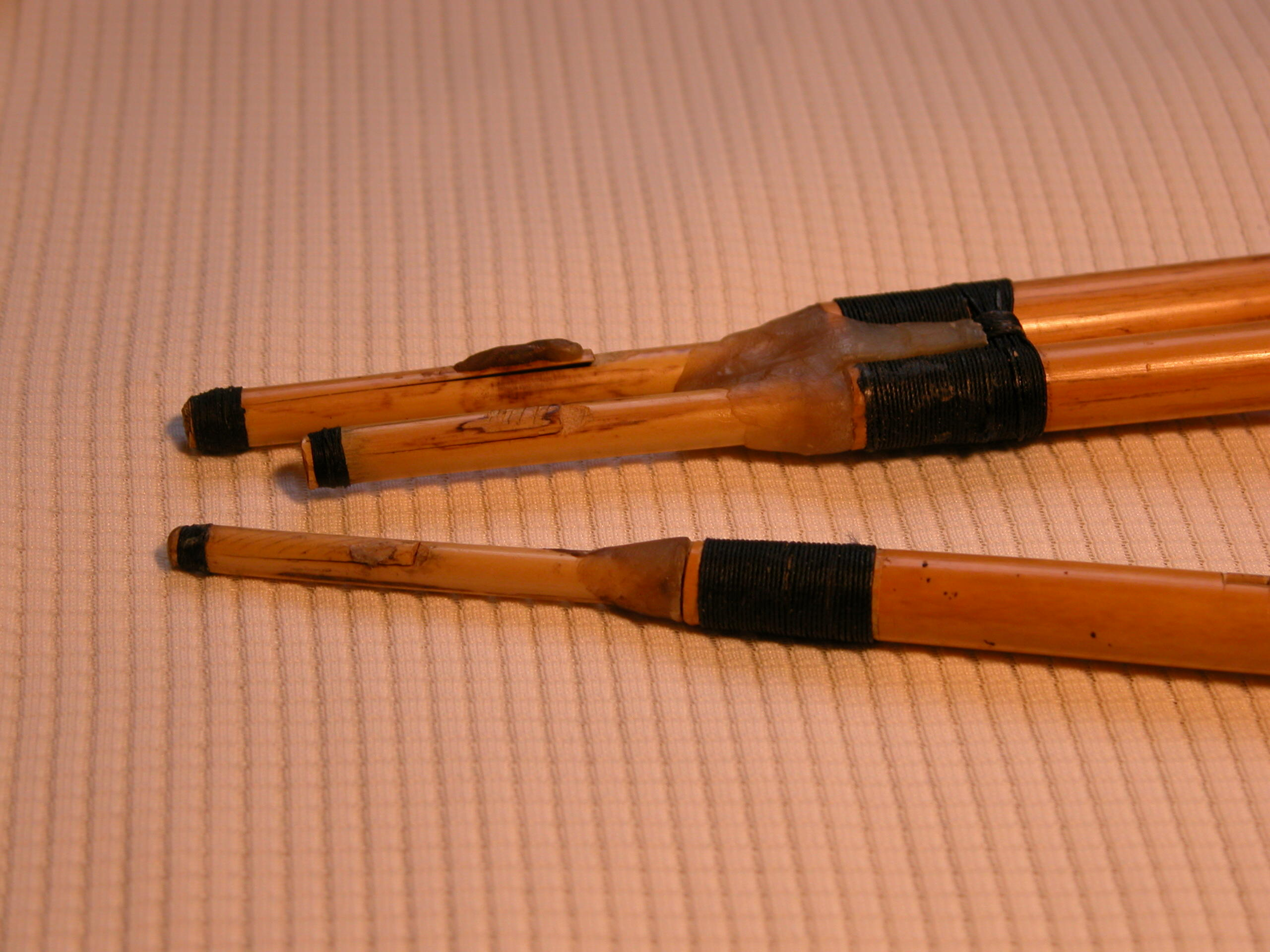
Single-reed tips of a launeddas. Reeds are split in the sidewall to create a tongue that vibrates when the player blows through it.

The pipes were reedpipes, each pipe tipped with a single reed held in place with beeswax. The instrument included a single pipe with fingerholes held in the player's right hand and a pair of pipes (joined together) held in the player's left hand. The right-hand pair consisted of a shorter pipe with fingerholes and a longer drone pipe. Researchers have indicated that the drone may have had a cup on the end made of animal horn. The combination is likely similar to the launeddas of Sardinia, and researcher Barnaby Brown has begun a revival of the instrument based on his experience with the launeddas.

== Place in culture ==
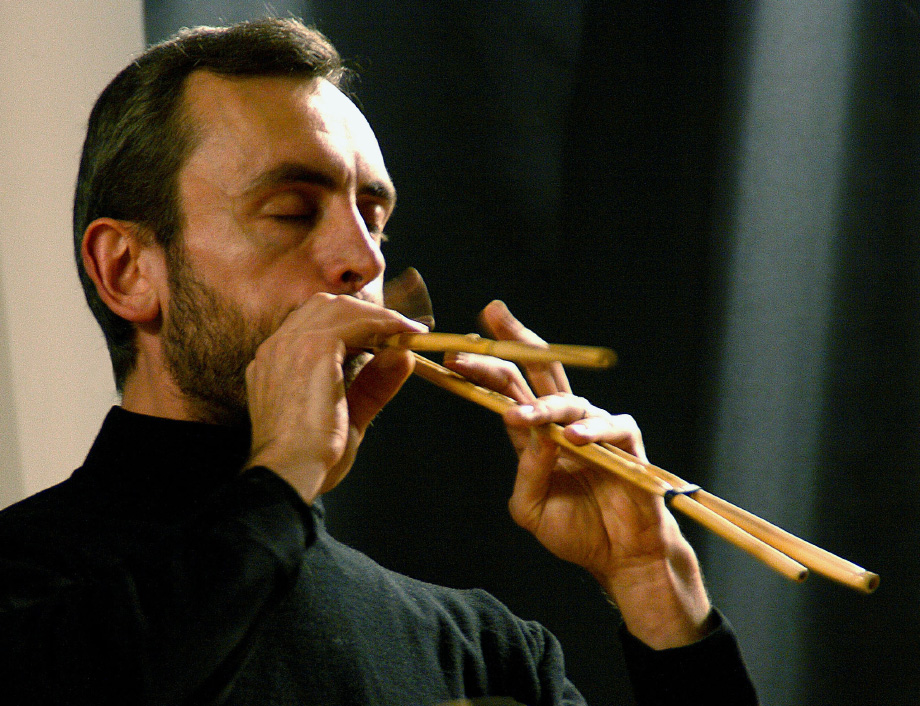
Barnaby Brown playing launeddas at Gavoi, Sardinia, 2007. Brown explored using the instrument for pibroch music.

Modern interest in the instrument is tied to interest in reviving Celtic or Scottish musical traditions. Barnaby Brown has speculated that pibroch music may have descended from triple-pipe playing, where today the music is tied to the Celtic harp-playing traditions. He suggested that early references to "pipes" in medieval texts may refer to the triple-pipe tradition, rather than the later bagpipe tradition.

Looking in art for clues to the triple-pipe's place in culture, Brown notes that the instruments were carved into the artwork in high crosses, played by clerical figures, placed musically with a harp or lyre. These things possibly indicate an elevated status for the instrument in medieval Gaelic society. The instrument may have been played as late as the 14th century, supplanted by the bagpipe, which was easier to play (because it did not require circular breathing).

== See also ==
- Aulos
- Launeddas
