= Buíte of Monasterboice =

6th-century Irish saint

Saint Buíte
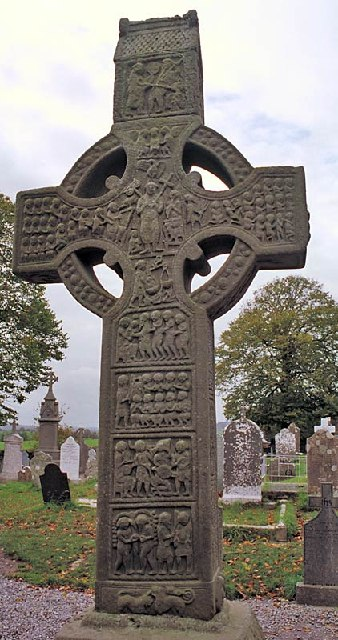
- "Muiredach's Cross" at Monasterboice
- Born: Ireland
- Died: c. 521
- Venerated in: Catholic Church
- Feast: 7 December

Buíte (died c. 519/20 or 521), also known as Buíte mac Bronach (Brónaig), and Boetius, was a sixth-century Irish monastic. He was born near Mellifont, Louth; visited Wales and Italy; returned through Germany and Scotland to Antrim, and thence to Louth, where he built Monasterboice, i.e. the Monastery of Buite.

== Ancestry ==
Buíte, son of Bronach, was descended from Tadhg, son of Cian, and therefore belonged to the Ciannachta. He was known as the "bishop of the monastery", that is of Monasterboice. The date of his birth is not known, but his death took place in 521, and this date is of special interest as determining that of Columba's birth, which is not given in the Annals of the Four Masters, but is stated in the following lines from Tigernach of Clones to have taken place on the same day:

The beloved Columba the clerk is born,
This day in Ireland the most learned,
On the same festival, I do not speak ignorantly,
With the fair triumphant death of the son of Bronach.

== Early life ==
Born in the neighbourhood of Mellifont, in the south of the county of Louth, his parents, who were Christians, were in much difficulty as to his baptism, no clergyman being within reach. But some missionary priests having touched at an adjoining port, one of them baptised him; a fountain, called Mellifons (Old Irish: "sweet water") having sprung up, as it was supposed, to supply water for his baptism. An incident of his youth indicates his personal character. Sent by his mother to bring home some calves, and not returning in the evening, his parents went in search of him, and found him asleep. When awoke he asked them why they disturbed him, as "the angels were teaching him psalms and ecclesiastical offices, and if he had not been awoke he would have learned the wisdom of God."

== Travels ==
When grown up he desired to devote himself to the service of God, and for this purpose seems first to have gone to Wales, with which the early Christians of Ireland were in close connection. Thence he proceeded to Italy, where, "in the monastery of Saint Tylia, he was gladly received on account of his knowledge of monastic discipline and acquaintance with holy scripture." Saint Tylia appears to be Saint Theilo, who became Bishop of Llandaff in 512, and some of whose people at a later period, when dispersed by a plague, took refuge in Italy, where the monastery may have afforded them shelter. Saint Theilo, before his appointment to Llandaff, had travelled much, and is even supposed to have been ordained bishop in Constantinople.

After a missionary expedition of one year to Germany, Buíte, with sixty companions, set out for the country of the Picts of Scotland. Here King Nectan, whom he is reported to have raised from the dead, bestowed on him the castrum (Latin: "fort") in which he lived, and the memory of the gift is perpetuated in the name of the place Carbuddo (Cathair-Buiti), near Dun-Nechtain, now Dunnichen, in Forfar.

Crossing over Scotland, he reached the Irish Sea, and embarking arrived at Dalriada, in the north of present-day County Antrim, the territory of the Cruthin, or Picts of Ireland, of the same race as those among whom he had been labouring. Here having raised the king's daughter from the dead, he received a gift of land, on which he built a church, and, leaving a disciple in charge, passed on, and proceeded to visit the nearest settlement of his relatives, the Cianachta ("primum solum Kyanacteorum"). There were two branches of the Cianachta, one situated near Dalriada, in that part of the north of the county of Londonderry now the barony of Keenaght, and who were known as the Cianachta of Glen Geimhin; the other, more to the south, in the present counties of Meath and Lowth, were called the Cianachta Breagh. It was to the former and nearest of these that Buíte now went, but the king, who was a gentilis (Latin: "heathen"), refused to receive him. Afterwards, however, he relented, and admitted him, when "he preached the word of salvation to the whole region, and baptised the king and all his household with many others." Here again he obtained a grant of land and built a monastery. His next journey was to the Cianachta of the south, where his brothers resided; after a brief visit to them he returned again to the north. Here he was admonished by an angel to settle in the "Bregensian land", that is the land of his southern relatives, and leaving Nechtan, the bishop, in charge of the monastery, probably at Dun-Geimhin (Dungiven), where a century and a half afterwards we find another Nechtan, he obeyed the call, and arriving at his destination was honourably received by the king.

== Monasterboice ==
In course of time and under his auspices he erected Monasterboice, the Monastery of Buíte (called in the Annals by the Latin form of his name, Boëthius), in the south of the county of Louth. There also "he, with his company, shed blessings as a shower, and amended the lives of many."

From this as a centre other establishments were formed, and numerous pastors sent forth, and the writer of his Life adds: "It is impossible to give the full praises of the man."

== Legacy ==
The death of Buíte took place on 7 December 521; and thirty years afterwards Saint Columba is said to have visited his tomb and enshrined his remains. The Latin word elevatio, which is that generally used for taking up and enshrining a saint's remains, has been misunderstood by the author of his Life, who took it to mean his ascension to heaven in the flesh. Columba afterwards consecrated a cemetery there. The place is called in Michael O'Clery's Martyrology of Donegal by the Irish name elaidh Indaraidh. But as Buíte's disciple, Nechtain, son of Saint Patrick's sister, Liamain, who seems to have been the person left by him at Glen Geimhin, had subsequently a monastery at Finnabhair or Findabhairabha, now Fennor-on-the-Boyne, it would seem that this is the place intended, and that elaidh Indaraidh stands for "Eillgheadh [Fh]mdabhairabha", "The tomb of the fair meadow on the river", which would therefore have been the burial-place of Saint Buíte.

The Annals have preserved the following distich referring to him:

Let Buíte, the virtuous judge of fame, come each day to my aid,
The fair hand with the glories of clean deeds, the good son of Bronach, son of Bolar.

And in the Calendar of Oengus he is thus noticed:

The feast of white victorious Buíte
Of treasurous Monaster.

His name is interpreted by the scholiast on Oengus as "living to God", for unto God he was alone, referring to 2 Corinthians 5:15.

He was the contemporary of Saint Patrick, whose nephew was one of his disciples, and an obscure quatrain exists which connects Ailbe of Emly with Buíte in the foundation of Monaster. His fame was considerable at a very early period, but he has been overshadowed by more recent saints, and especially by Saint Patrick, and very little is therefore recorded of him in Irish history; but the importance of his chief church (primh-chell) of Monasterboice is indicated by the ruins of two very ancient churches, a round tower, and three sculptured crosses. Two of these are among the finest in Ireland, one being fifteen feet high and the other twenty-seven.

== Sources ==
- MS. Life of St. Buite;
- Ware MSS. in British Museum, Cod. Clar. 39, Add. No. 4788;
- Annals of the Four Masters at AD 521;
- Adamnan's Life of St. Columba;
- Michael O'Clery's Martyrology of Donegal, pp. 329, 333;
- Skene's Chronicle of the Picts and Scots, pp. 66, 411, 435;
- Stokes's Calendar of Oengus, p. clxxx.

== Bibliography ==
- Olden, Thomas (1886). "Buite" . In Stephen, Leslie (ed.). Dictionary of National Biography. Vol. 7. London: Smith, Elder & Co. pp. 229–231.
- Stalmans, Natalie, and T. M. Charles-Edwards (2007). "Meath, saints of (act. c.400–c.900)". In Oxford Dictionary of National Biography. Oxford: Oxford UP, 2004–. n.p.
