= Muiredach's High Cross =

Medieval high cross in Ireland

Coordinates: 53°46′39″N 6°25′03″W

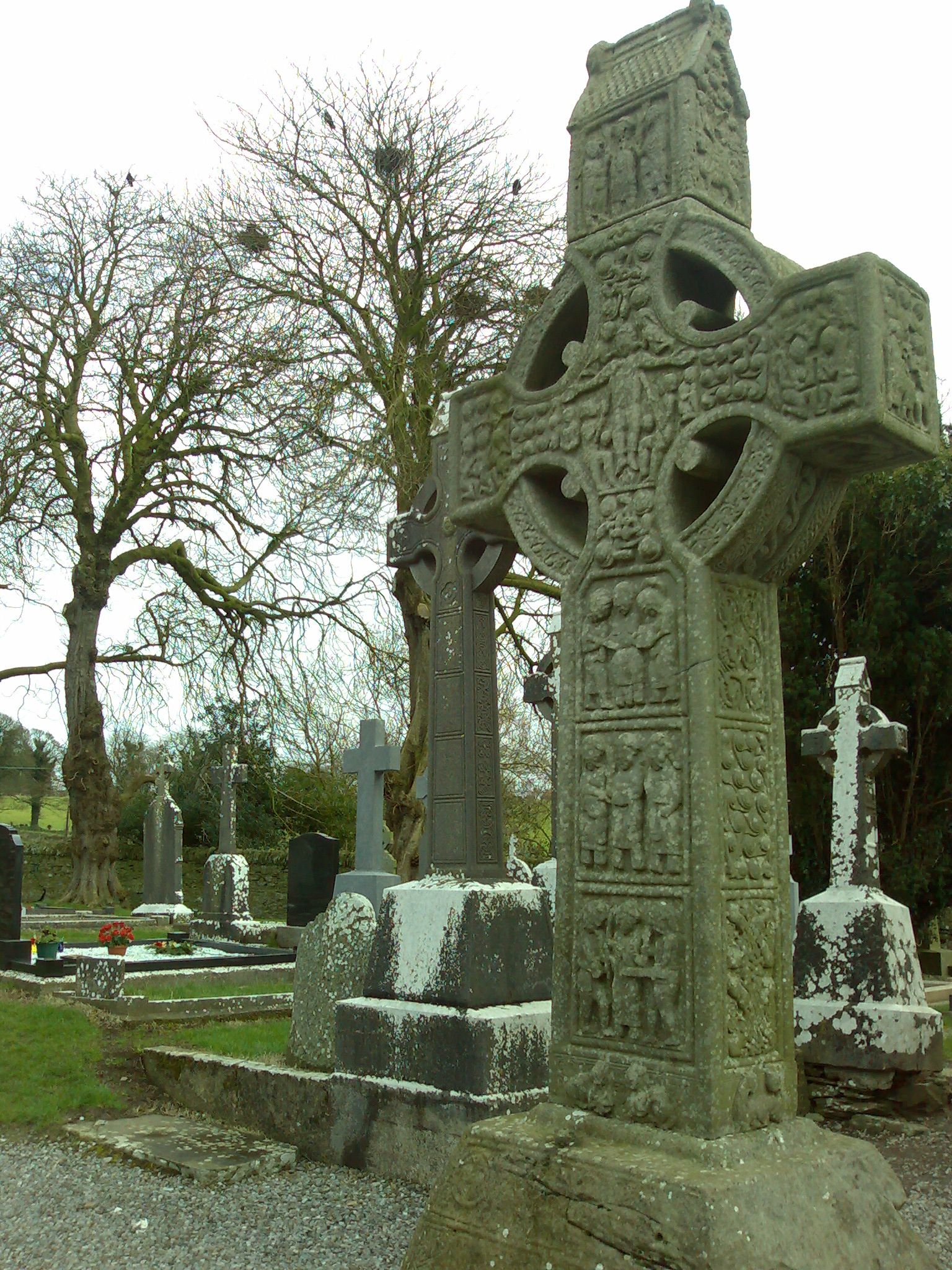
West-face of Muiredach's High Cross.

Muiredach's High Cross is a high cross from the 10th or possibly 9th century, located at the ruined monastic site of Monasterboice, in County Louth, Ireland. There are two other high crosses at Monasterboice; in local terms Muiredach's cross is also known as the South Cross. Muiredach's cross is the most impressive surviving example of early medieval Irish stonework, and the crosses at Monasterboice have been said to be Ireland's greatest contribution to European sculpture.

== Background: high crosses in Ireland ==
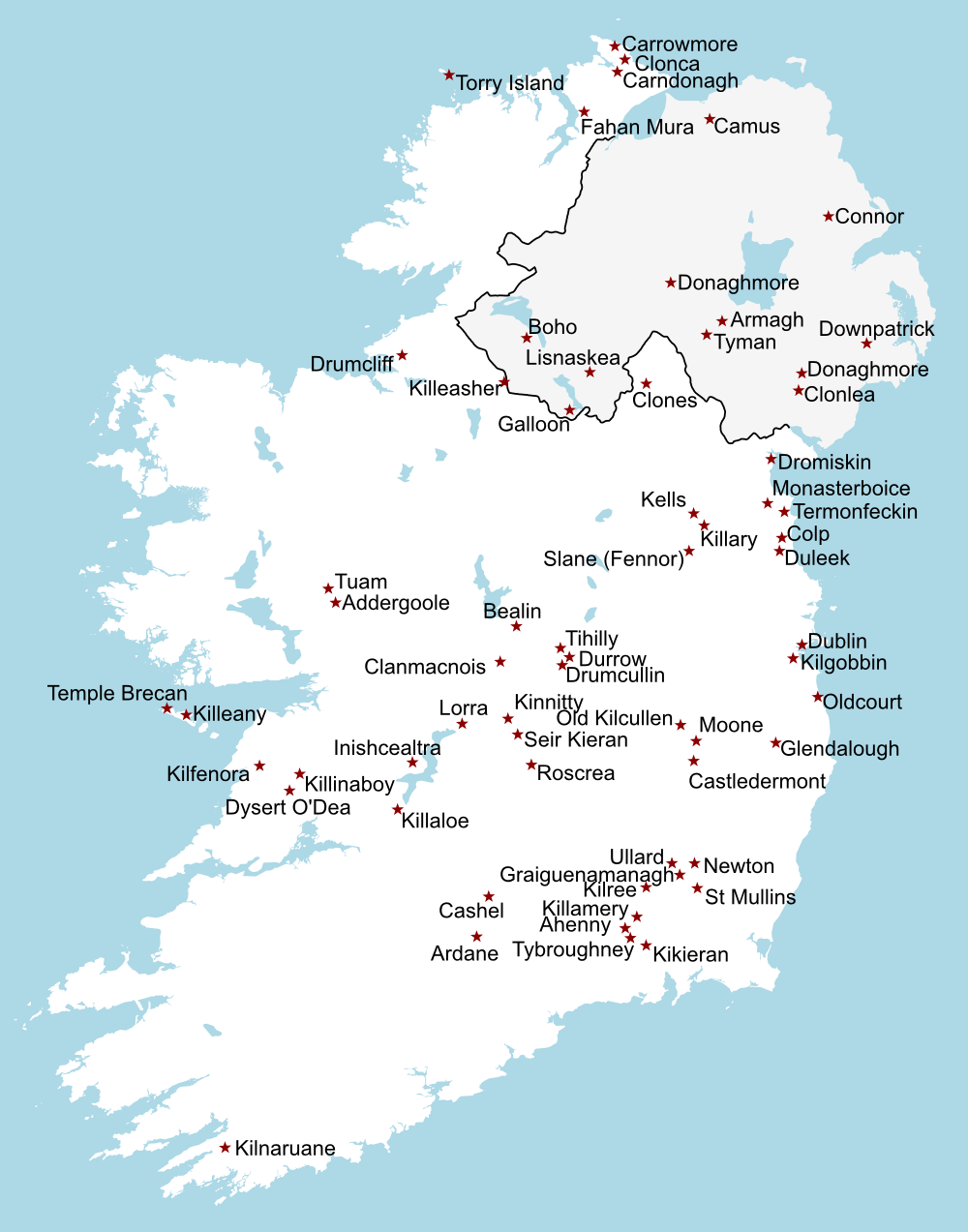
Location of high crosses in Ireland.

Irish high crosses are internationally recognised icons of early medieval Ireland. They are usually found on early church sites and can be either plain or decorated. High crosses served a variety of functions including, liturgical, ceremonial, and symbolic uses. They were also used as markers for an area of sanctuary around a church; as well as focal points for markets, which grew around church sites. The "greatest", or "classic", Irish high crosses can be found at Durrow Abbey, the Abbey of Kells, and at Monasterboice. These high crosses are decorated with panels inscribed with biblical themes; and are thought to be influenced from late antiquity and early medieval Rome. Such 'classic' high crosses comprise the largest corpus of biblical sculpture in all of Europe, in the last quarter of the first millennium CE. The sculpted panels are thought to have been originally painted, though no traces of paint survive today. On such high crosses, the east face tends to show scenes from the Old Testament and the Book of Revelation; while the west face shows scenes from the New Testament. High crosses can be dated from the inscriptions they bear; and it is difficult to date the majority of the plain and undecorated high crosses. The earliest Irish high crosses, at Kinnity, County Offaly, have been dated to 846–862 CE. Both Muiredach's cross and the Cross of the Scriptures at Clonmacnoise have been dated to about 900–920 CE. High crosses are thought to have originated as stone versions of decorated wooden or metal crosses; and the stone crosses which survive today are considered to be the last phase of development of the high cross. Early forms are thought to have been made of wood, with ornamented panels of bronze sheeting; and would have been much smaller than the grand high crosses which survive today. Irish high crosses are considered to have been derived from stone crosses in Britain, where they became popular in the 8th century.

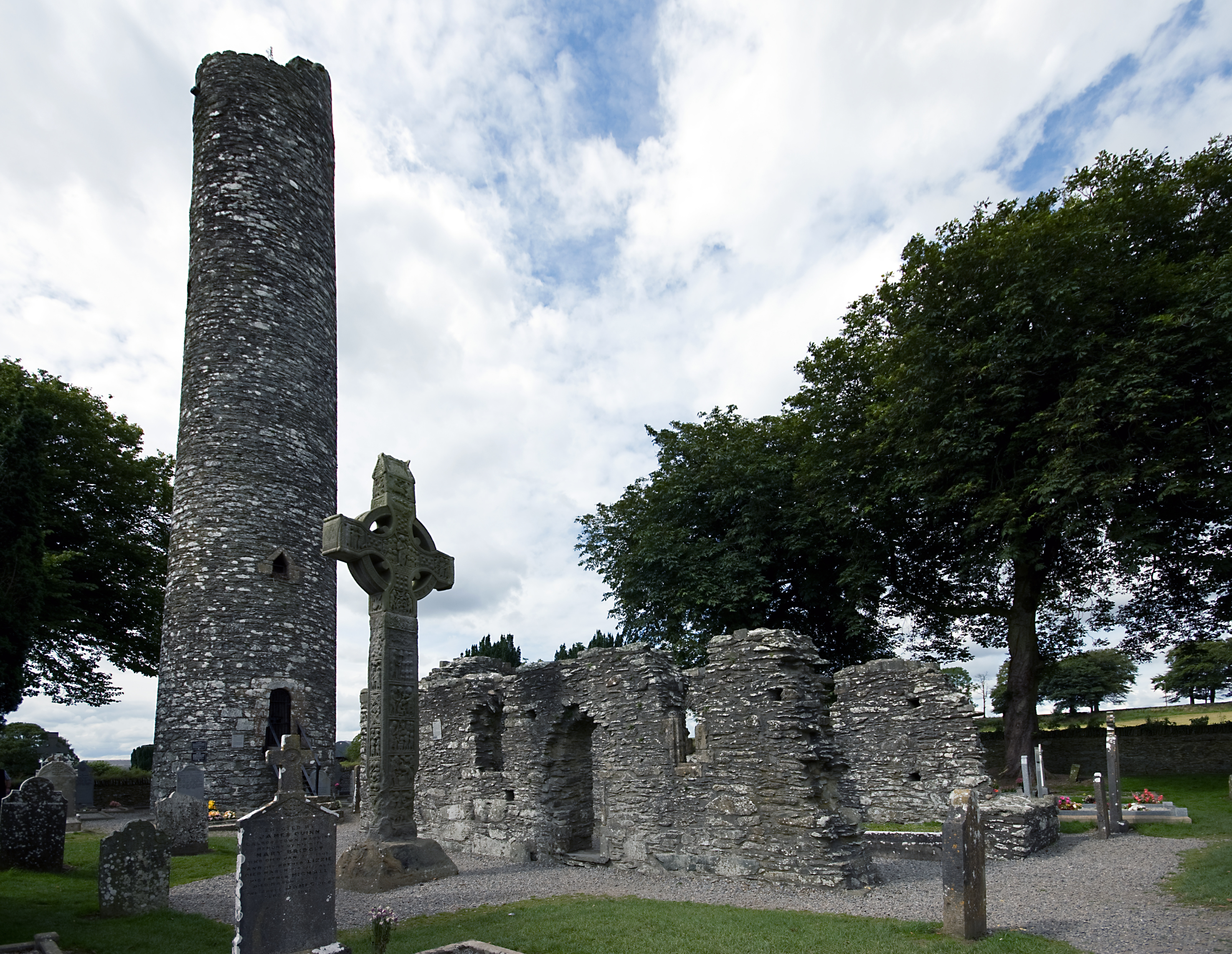
Ruinous Monasterboice today. Pictured is a round tower, church ruins and one of the site's three early mediaeval high crosses.

Muiredach's High Cross is one of three surviving high crosses located at Monasterboice (Gaeilge: Mainistir Bhuithe, "Buithe's monastery"). The monastic site is said to be founded in the 6th century, by St Buithe. It is most famous for its 9th and 10th century high crosses—most notably Muiredach's High Cross. These crosses are all made of sandstone and are referred to as the North, West, and South Crosses. It is not certain whether they stand in their original locations. The South Cross is commonly known as Muiredach's cross because of an inscription on the bottom of the west-face. The inscription reads ÓR DO MUIREDACH LAS NDERNAD IN CHROS, which translates from Gaeilge as "a prayer for Muiredach who had this cross made". It is thought that this Muiredach is likely Muiredach mac Domhnall (died 923), who was one of the monastery's most celebrated abbots; he was also the abbot-elect of Armagh and also the steward of the southern Uí Néill. There is, however, another abbot named Muiredach who died in 844. Another possibility is that Muiredach may refer to Muiredach mac Cathail (died 867); a king whose territory included the site of the monastery.

The cross measures about 19 feet (5.8 m) high; including the base, which measures 2 feet 3 inches (0.69 m). The cross is made of sandstone which is yellow in colour. The main shaft of the cross is carved from a single block of sandstone; the base and the capstone on the top are carved from separate stones. The base is the shape of a truncated pyramid of four sides. It measures 2 feet 2 inches (0.66 m) high and 4 feet 9 inches (1.45 m) at the bottom; it tapers to 3 feet 8 inches (1.12 m) by 3 feet 4 inches (1.02 m) at the top. The main shaft is rectangular, measuring 6 feet 6 inches (1.98 m) high; 2 feet 2 inches (0.66 m) by 1 foot 8 inches (0.51 m) at the bottom. tapering to 2 feet 4 inches (0.71 m) by 1 foot 7 inches (0.48 m) at the top. The topmost stone, or capstone, is carved in the shape of a house, with a sloping roof; and has a crescent-shaped finial at each end. It is thought that such house-shaped capstones may represent reliquaries, which, like the Monymusk Reliquary, typically took this form in Irish Christianity.

Every piece of the cross is divided into panels which are decorated with carvings. The carvings are remarkably well preserved, however, they certainly would have originally had much finer detail. Even so, certain details about clothing, weapons, and other things, can still be clearly made out. Biblical themes dominate the carved panels; though there are pieces which feature certain geometric shapes and interlace ornaments.

20th century Irish archaeologist Robert Alexander Stewart Macalister noted that there are 124 figures sculpted upon the panels of the cross—119 of which shown in some form of costume. The cross is not unlike other works of Insular art where the artist has represented people in contemporary costume. All, except one, of the figures is depicted bare-headed. The lone figure with headgear is Goliath, who wears a conical helmet. Generally the hair is worn clipped in a straight line over the forehead, though in some cases it is shown to be distinctly curly. Many of the figures have no facial hair, though several of them wear very long moustaches, with heavy ends which hang down to the level of the chin. There are very few beards represented; those shown with beards are Adam, Cain, Moses and Saul. Macalister considered that the artist excelled in the geometric and abstract patterns which appear on the cross. On the ring surrounding the head of the cross, there are 17 different patterns. Macalister stated that geometric patterns fall into three categories: spiral, interlace, and key-patterns.

=== Concerns over the conservation of the Cross ===
Recently there have been concerns raised over the safety and protection of the cross. In 2004 Barry McGahon, chairperson of the Monasterboice Tour Guides, stated to an Irish newspaper that it was not well protected; and suggested that a railing around the cross would temporally keep people from interfering with it. McGahon stated that the cross had begun to take longer drying out and that it seemed like rain was seeping into it. He added that acid rain and pollution from a newly opened M1 motorway would have adverse effects upon the cross. In 2008, Peter Harbison, professor of archaeology, advised that they should be brought indoors to protect them from the elements. He stated that if they were not so-protected they would continue to decay—as sandstone decomposes easily.

=== Proposed UNESCO World Heritage Site ===
In about 2008 Harbison stated that the crosses at Monasterboice could probably be regarded as Ireland's greatest contribution to European sculpture. In April 2009 The Irish Times reported that the Government of Ireland was about to submit a list of sites—among them Monasterboice—to UNESCO to be considered a World Heritage Site.

== Description of panels ==
=== East face ===
East face panel key

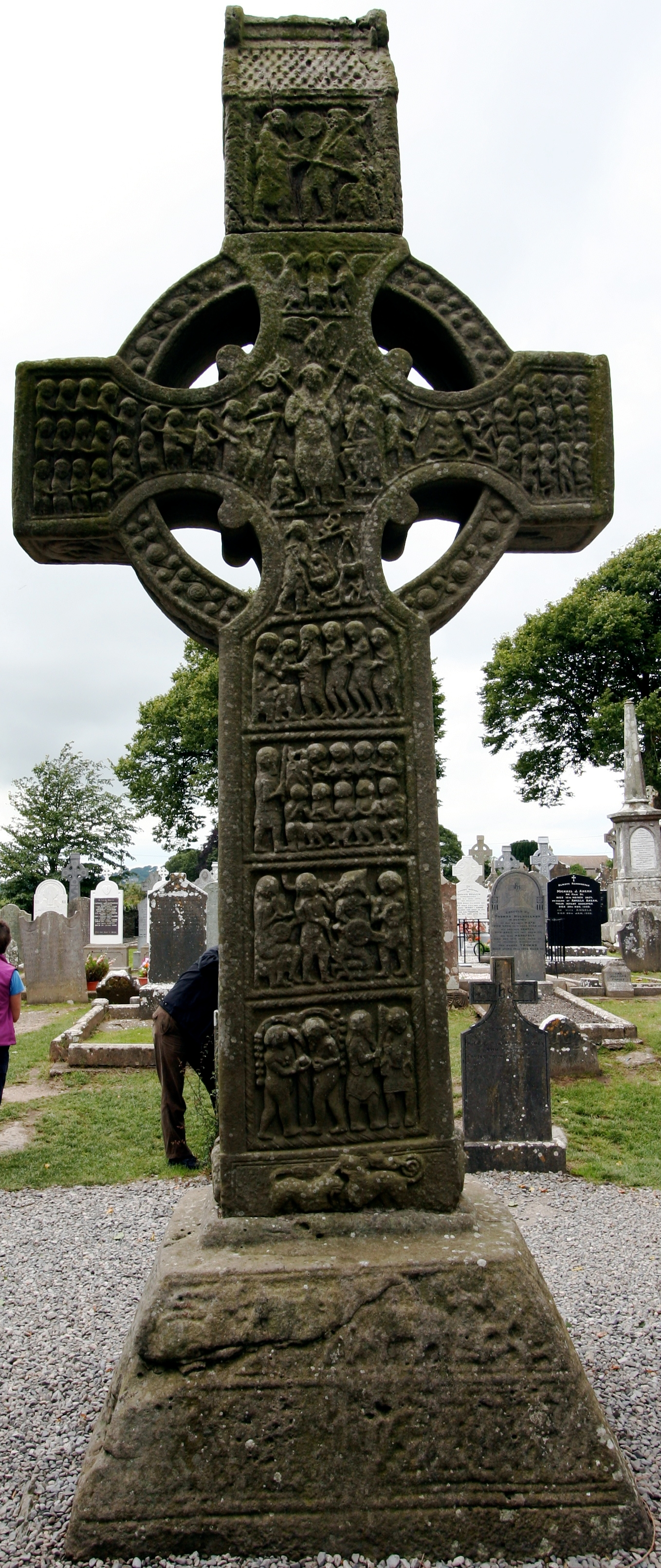
East face

- Panel 1. This panel depicts two hermit saints—Anthony and Paul of Thebes—holding a loaf of bread, with a raven sitting on the ground beside them. This panel is related to panel 1 on the north face, which shows Anthony and Paul meeting.
- Panel 6. It is uncertain what this panel represents. J. Romilly Allen proposed that this panel may represent a soul being carried to heaven by two angels. Macalister thought it possible that the panel represented the Recording angel.
- Panel 7. This panel represents The Last Judgement. It contains more than 45 figures; in the centre, Jesus is standing, holding a floriated sceptre in the right hand and the Cross of the Resurrection in the left. On the head of Christ there is a bird—possibly a phoenix, the symbol of the Resurrection. At the foot of Christ is a small, kneeling figure with an open book over the head. Macalister considered that this likely represents an angel with the Book of Life. On the right of Christ is David enthroned, playing a harp, upon which the Holy Spirit rests in the form of a dove; behind are a choir of angels playing instruments. On the left of Christ (behind a man playing the triple pipes) are Lost Souls, being driven away from Christ by a devilish creature holding a trident.
- Panel 8. This panel shows three figures: Michael, the Devil, and a human. Michael is shown weighing the soul of a human in a balance. The balance is suspended by a chain upon a cross-bar above. The Devil is lying prostrated below, while attempting to pull down the empty scale of the balance to influence it in his favour. Michael also holds a staff and is thrusting it into the Devil's head. Macalister stated that this scene is not recorded on any other Irish high cross. Recent accounting-history research has interpreted this scene as part of a wider tradition in which images of weighing, judgement, and record-keeping linked moral accountability with ideas of rendering an account.
- Panel 9. This panel represents the Adoration of the Magi. Usually the Magi are represented as three, because of their three gifts of gold, frankincense, and myrrh. However, in some cases, likely for symmetry's sake, they are also depicted in a group of four—as in this panel, being led by a long-bearded and aged Saint Joseph the Betrothed. Over the head of Christ is the Star of Bethlehem.
- Panel 10. This panel depicts Moses drawing water from the rock. Moses is depicted standing with a staff, in front of a crowd of thirsty Israelites, while water is gushing forth from a hole. The two rows of Israelites are likely meant to show people standing next to each other; and this is another example of the trouble of perspective in such carvings. The scene is chosen for its New Testament typological application, as Christ is the spiritual rock, the source of the living water. The scene is not infrequently used in catacombs and other places where early Christian art is found; but it is very rare in Insular art.
- Panel 11. This panel depicts the battle between David and Goliath. The two combatants stand in the middle of the panel are likely meant to be in the foreground; there is figure on either side of the combatants which are likely meant to be seen as in the background. David has a shepherd's crook over one shoulder, and in the other hand he holds a sling, hanging open to show that the stone has already been cast. Over his shoulder is suspended a wallet in which the stones were stored. Goliath is depicted on his knees, with a hand against his forehead, to indicate that he has been struck there. He wears a conical helmet; being the only one character depicted on the cross to wear any kind of head-covering. He bears a round shield and a short dagger. To the left of the two combatants is a seated figure, likely King Saul, who also has a round shield and carries a short sword, and is drinking from a horn. The fourth figure, to the right of the combatants, is according to Macalister, likely Jonathan, though this figure may also represent Goliath's armourer.
- Panel 12. This is a double panel, which contains two scenes. The left scene depicts Adam and Eve, standing under the forbidden tree, which is heavily laden with fruit. Coiled around the tree is the serpent, which is whispering into the ear of Eve, who is handing the apple to Adam. According to Macalister, this is one of the most common scenes sculpted on high crosses (however it is not carved on the tallest cross at Monasterboice). This scene gives an explanation of how sin entered the world; the next scene shows the first murder. The scene on the right depicts Cain and Abel. Cain is represented as a middle-aged man with a beard, who grasps Abel, pictured as a beardless youth, and buries a cleaver into his head.
- Panel 13. This panel shows two animals playing with each other; Macalister thought they were possibly lions.

==== Panels A and B ====
These panels appear on the under-side of the cross.

- Panel B. This panel is located on the under-side of one of the arms of the cross. It shows a hand surrounded by conventionalised clouds. This panel represents the Hand of God, or Dextra Dei, which has long been used as a Christian symbol. With very few exceptions, it was not until about the 12th century that artists presumed to make a full human likeness of God. Before this time the normal way of representing God was showing a hand issuing from the clouds. According to Macalister this scene has no connection with any of the others sculpted on the cross. He considered that since it appears on the under-side, where a bystanders can see the hand above their head, that the Hand of God was outstretched towards the bystander. The Red Hand of Ulster may be based upon a mythological motif; however, it may also be based upon the Dextra Dei.

=== West face ===
West face panel key

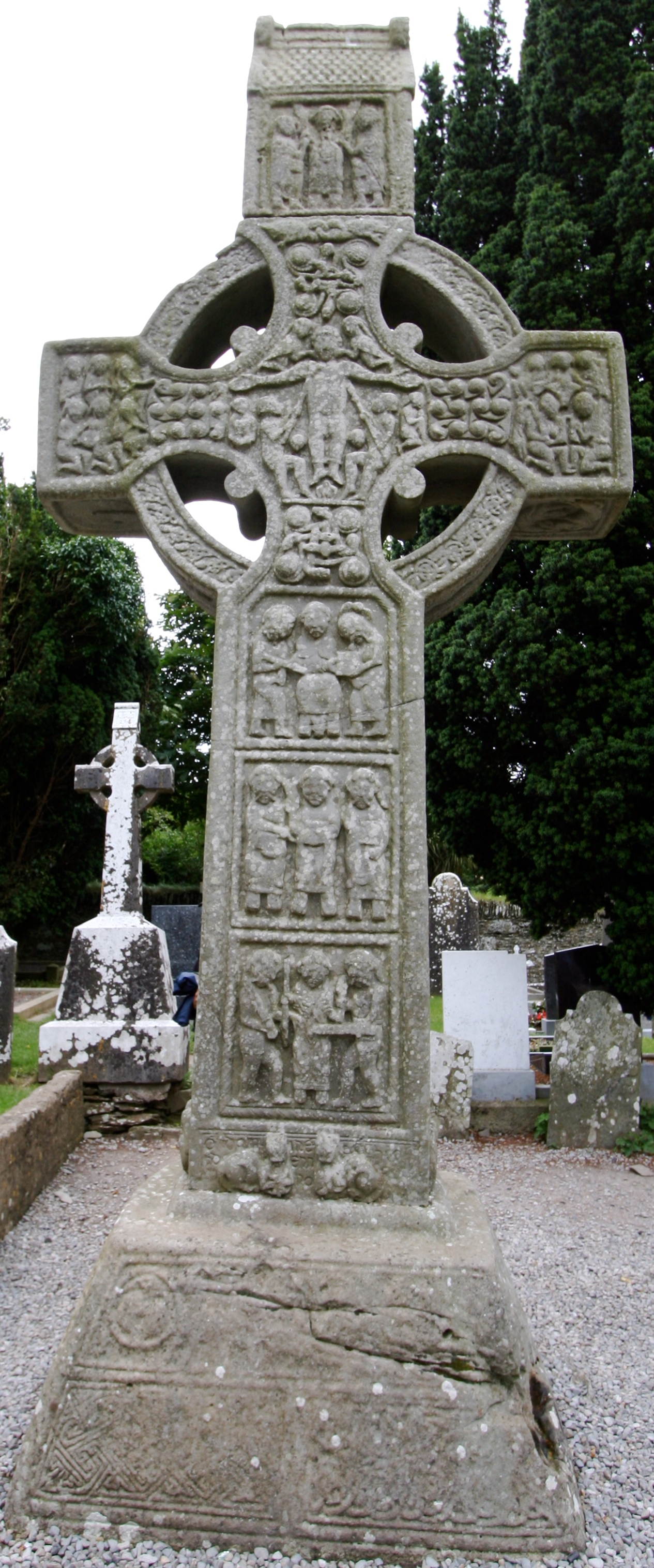
West face

- Panel 1a. The panel depicts Moses on Mount Sinai, with Aaron and Hur supporting his hands.
- Panel 11. This panel depicts the Crucifixion of Christ. The central figure is Christ upon the cross. He is fully clothed, which is normal in European representations of the Crucifixion at this date. His arms are stretched straight and horizontal. The lance-bearer and sponge-bearer are placed symmetrically on either side of Christ. MacAlister thought that the two circular knobs appearing between them and Christ probably represent the sun and moon, referring to the darkness at the Crucifixion. MacAlister stated that it was uncertain what the bird at the foot of the cross represented. He stated that some thought it is a symbol of the resurrection, and that others thought it represents the dove of peace. There is a similar bird above the Crucifixion on the high cross at Kells. On the outside of the lance-bearer and sponge-bearer are two small figures—a woman, and a man kneeling on one knee, probably representing the Virgin Mary and John.
- Panel 13. MacAlister thought that this panel probably represented the parting commission of the ascending Christ to his Apostles. The central figure (Christ) is seated; a footstool shaped like an animal's head appears between his feet. He hands a roll to the figure on the left; he hands a book to the figure on the right. MacAlister stated that this figure on the right is John, as his symbol of an eagle (likely an eagle) is shown above his head.
- Panel 14. This panel features three figures. The middle figure has his hand raised in benediction. The figure on the left is stretching out his finger and touching the side of the central figure. MacAlister considered this panel to represent the Incredulity of Thomas ("Doubting Thomas"), which is now the general view; if this is so, it would be quite unique on Irish crosses, though the scene is often found in other Early Medieval Christian art.
- Panel 15. This panel shows three men; it is thought to represent the seizure of Christ in the garden of Gethsemane. The panel shows Christ, in the middle, holding a staff and being arrested by two men with military equipment. A similar representation of this scene is also pictured on the Cross of King Flann at Clonmacnois.
- Panels A and B. See east face section for detailed description.

=== North face ===
Key to the panels on the north and south faces.

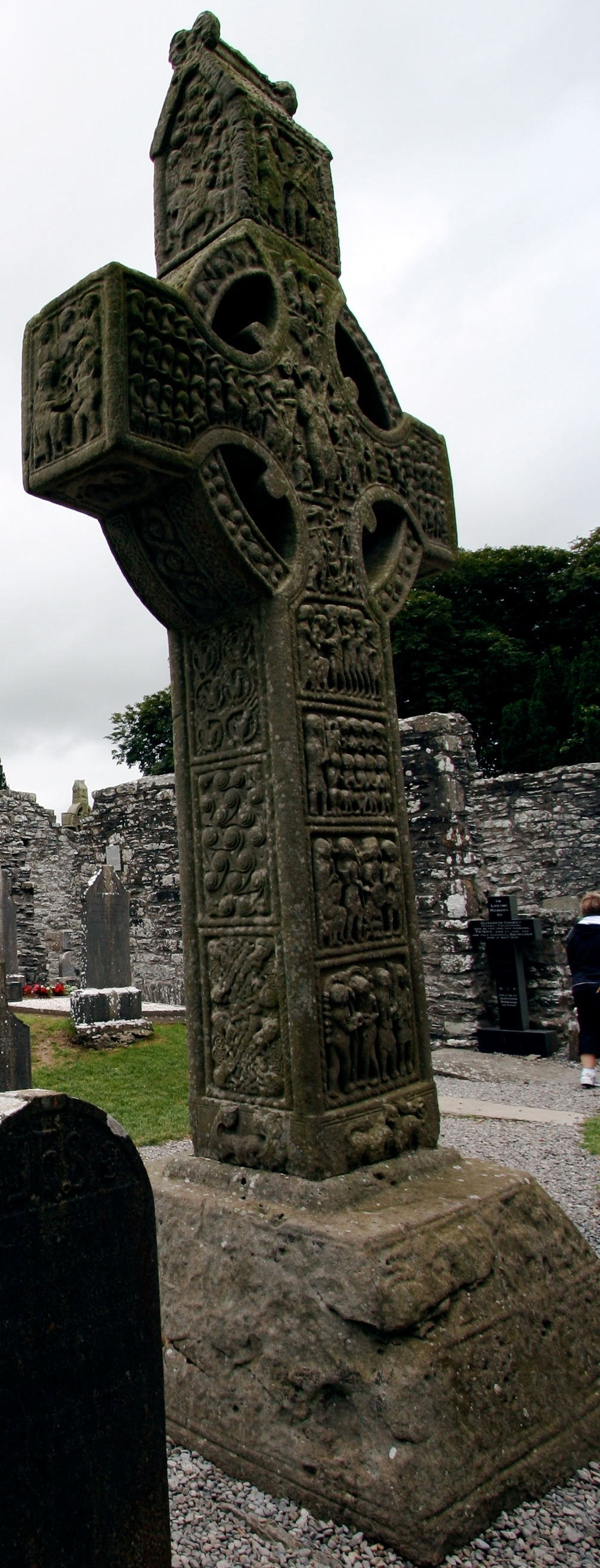
East and south faces

- Panel 5. It is uncertain what this panel is supposed to represent. The panels shows three angels, a seated figure holding something unintelligible, and two other figures, one of which appears to be un-draped, holding rods. MacAlister proposed that this panel may represent the Scourging of Christ, but he was not satisfied with his guess.

=== South face ===
- Panel 1. This panel shows a horseman, and above a much badly weathered pattern of spirals which are hard to make out. Macalister proposed that this panel could represent one of the mystic riders described in the Book of Revelation.
- Panel 5. This panel depicts Pilate washing his hands. The Gospel of Matthew states that before condemning Jesus to death, Pilate washed his hands with water in front of the crowd, saying, "I am innocent of this man's blood.."(Matt 27:24)
- Panel 9. This panel shows a coiling plant; in six of the coils there is an animal kicking up its hind legs. The hind legs of the middle two animals entwine to be part of a fretwork in the middle of the panel. At the top of the panel are two birds feeding.

== Sources ==
Footnotes

References

- Allen, J. Romilly (1992). The High Crosses of Ireland. Felinfach: Llanerch Publishers. ISBN 0-947992-90-1. Facsimile reprint. Originally published in 1887 in London, by Whiting & Co.
- Donnelly, James S; et al., eds. (2004). Encyclopedia of Irish History and Culture. Vol. 1. Macmillan Reference USA. ISBN 0-02-865989-9.
- Duffy, Seán; et al., eds. (2005). Medieval Ireland: An Encyclopedia. New York City and London: Routledge. ISBN 0-415-94052-4.
- Halpin, Andy; Newman, Conor (2006). Ireland: An Oxford Archaeological Guide to Sites from Earliest Times to AD 1600. Oxford: Oxford University Press. ISBN 978-0-19-280671-0.
- Koch, John T.; et al., eds. (2006). Celtic Culture: a Historical Encyclopedia. Vol. 1. ABC-CLIO. ISBN 1-85109-445-8.
- Macalister, Robert Alexander Stewart (1914). Muiredach, Abbot of Monasterboice, 890–923 A.D.: His Life and Surroundings. Dublin: Hodges, Figgis & Co.
