= Athclare Castle =

Tower house in County Louth, Ireland

- Caisleán Áth Cláir (Irish)
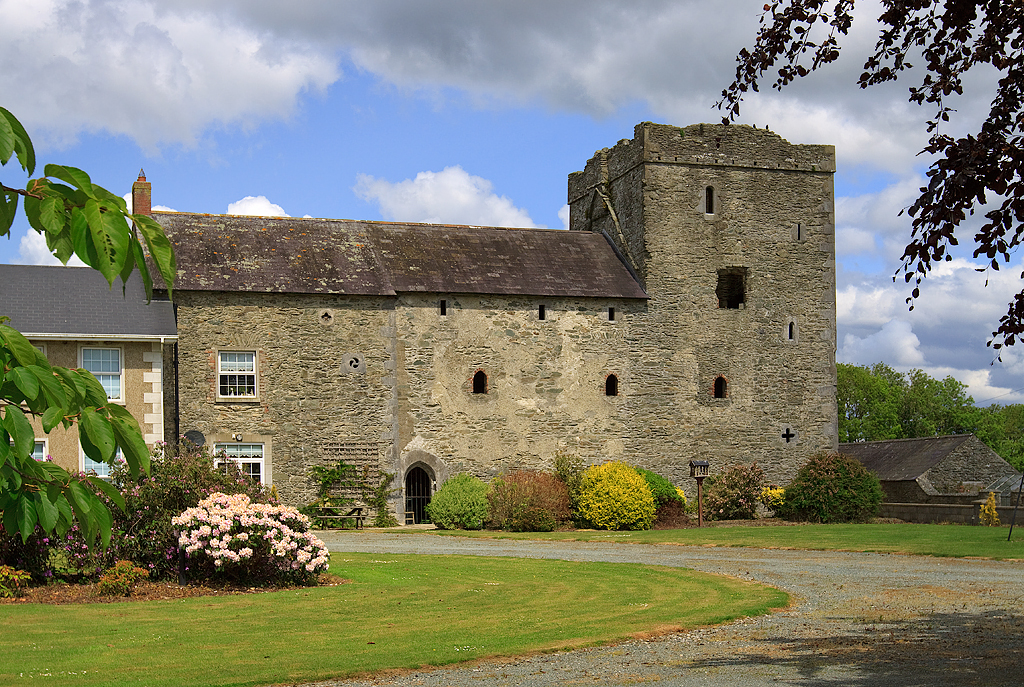
- South face of Athclare

- Athclare Castle in Ireland
- 53.8152°N 6.3979°W

History
- Built: c.1550
- Built for: Barnewell family

Site notes
- Area: Dunleer, Ireland
- Architectural style: Fortified limestone tower house

Athclare Castle (or archaically Aclare, Irish Caisleán Áth Cláir) is a Tudor tower house in the Dunleer area of County Louth in Ireland. Built in the 1550s, Athclare was built for the Barnewell family, and is typical of defensive architectural structures built in the Pale during the Tudor period in Ireland. Athclare has been extended and adapted in the centuries since its construction. Rated as a site of national social historical importance in the National Inventory of Architectural Heritage, Athclare Castle is included in the Record of Protected Structures maintained by Louth County Council.

== Architecture ==
The core of Athclare castle is a detached multiple-bay three-storey tower house, built on a rectangular plan in the 1550s. To the east of the tower block is a hall containing an early 17th-century chimneypiece.

The 16th-century tower house stands complete to the parapet with various loop insertions, including angle and cross loops, and there is also a ventilator at the upper level at the opposite end to the tower. Features of the castle also include a pitched slate roof, clay ridge tiles, red brick corbelled chimneystack, half-round gutters on corbelled eaves course, corbelled stone parapet to tower, random rubble stone walling, stone quoins, stone string course to parapet, pointed archways, square-headed window opening, arrow loops to north, south and east including decorative arrow loop to first floor south elevation, stone surrounds, a pointed arch door opening to south, and dressed limestone voussoirs.

The castle is still in partially residential use, and a two-storey house directly abuts it to the west. As a result, the castle features some relatively modern additions, including, circular cast-iron downpipes, a steel gate, square-headed door openings to north, smooth rendered surrounds, some uPVC windows, uPVC and timber and glazed doors, hipped and pitched slate roofs, random rubble stone walling, segmental-headed window openings, red brick surrounds, painted timber casements etc., as well as a collection of agricultural buildings attached to the old castle.

== History ==
Athclare's location, a mere 8 km from the coast (at Annagassan), and within the fertile arable and pasture land of central Louth would have made it a prime location for farming at the time of the tower-house's location. Its being relatively close to the border of the Pale, especially at a time of considerable disorder in North Eastern Ireland at the time of its construction, make obvious the need for a fortified dwelling of the nature of Athclare. Constructed originally for the Barnewell family, the original structure was extended in the 1650s, and by that time was in the hands of the Taaffes.

After the Cromwellian conquest, the Townley Family of Lancashire held the castle (though rented from the grantee, Erasmus Smith of Edmondthorpe) and in 1661, Henry Townley is recorded as having resided there, and his collected papers are a valuable source on the social history of the period. The castle was significantly altered again in the 1840s, with the latter additions resulting in a number of out-buildings being added to form a north-forming courtyard to the site.

Writing in the 1940s, the historian Henry G. Tempest described the then state of the castle as follows:

Athclare castle stands a mile south of Dunleer, a strong square stone building, battlemented round a modern roof. Attached to it is a longer building of lower roofing at some time a part of the castle. In the Castle itself one spiral stair runs from ground level to the third storey to the roof the second storey, once the principal room, is reached by two exterior flights of stone steps, one straight, the other curved, meeting at the door. In the large room opening from this second story, under the lower roof is a fine carved stone fire-place and mantle retaining some traces of the gold, red and blue painting that once decorated it and bearing at one side of the Townley crest - a hawk on a perch beaked and belled and on the right another crest in very low relief (or perhaps rubbed off) resembling the arm with sword of the Taaffes. All the floors are gone except that of stone on the second storey. Five old beams still remain resting on stone corbels. On the ground floor are the three vaulted rooms in the plaster ceilings of which are the impressions of the rushffor willow covered cores or arches on which they were possibly originally built. Two peculiar smaller chambers opening on the yard are contained in the solid base f the outside steps and look like nothing more than dog kennels. The castle was extended towards the West as the slope of roof on the outside wall indicates. Foundations had been found in the yard attached to the Castle and some time ago a large chimney stood about 10ft away to the West

The castle sits just east of the modern M1 Motorway and is a National Monument under the Guardianship of the Irish Minister for Environment, Heritage and Local Government, but under private ownership. At least one of the two fine fireplaces previously within the castle have been removed to the adjacent dwelling house. The castle has the Record of Monuments and Places Number "LH018-040----" by the National Monuments Service.
