= Grangewilliam =

Grangewilliam is also known as Donaghmore (Domhnach Mór), is a monastic settlement about 1 mile (2 km) outside Maynooth, County Kildare. The monastery stood here until about the 11th century. There remain the ruins of the walls and gable of the 14th-century church built on the site as well as a small graveyard. It is surrounded by the Carton Demesne. It has been famous since 1902, when an Ogam stone was found there by Lord Walter Fitzgerald, the son of the Charles FitzGerald of Carton House, the fourth Duke of Leinster.

The small cemetery encircles the church. One relatively recent burial there was the former president of St. Patrick's College, Maynooth from 1994 to 1996, Monsignor Matthew O’Donnell who died aged 63 while in office. He was buried in his father's grave.

There is usually a temporary structure from which the annual blessing of the graves, and mass is conducted.
