= Rockmarshall Court Tomb =

- Tuama Cúirte Charraig an Mharascalaigh (Irish)
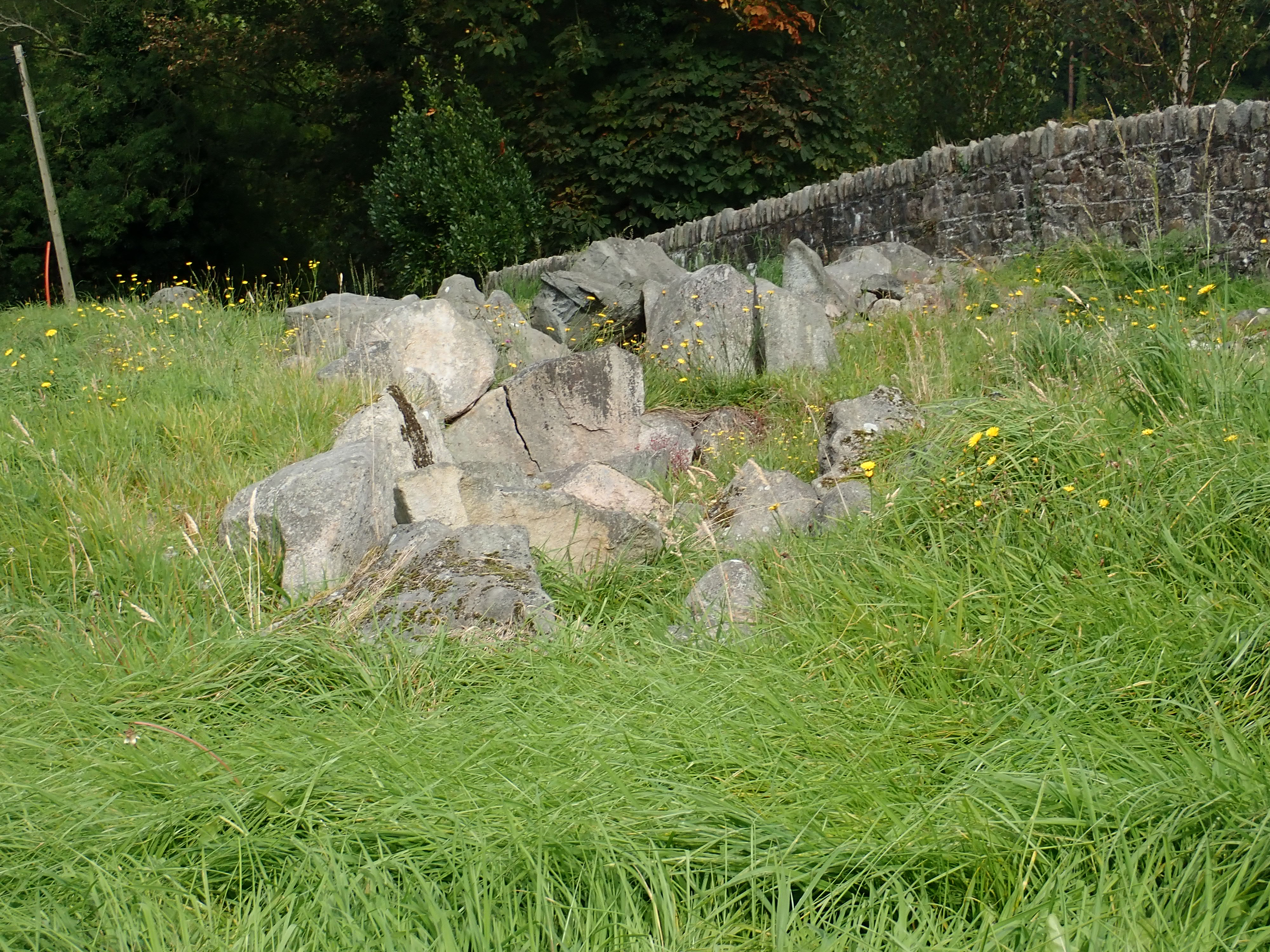
- The cairn in 2017

- Location in Ireland
- 54.009185°N 6.284757°W
- Type: court cairn
- Location: County Louth, Ireland

History
- Built: c. 3500 BC

Site notes
- Elevation: 50 m (160 ft)

National monument of Ireland
- Official name: Rockmarshall
- Reference no.: 562

Rockmarshall Court Tomb is a court cairn and National Monument located on the Cooley Peninsula, Ireland.

== Location ==
Rockmarshall Court Tomb is located immediately southwest of Rockmarshall House, on the southern slopes of Annaloughan Mountain.

== History ==
Rockmarshall has been settled since the Mesolithic (c. 5700 BC on); excavation of a midden shows late tools, oysters and periwinkles.

The Carlingford Lough/Cooley Peninsula region was low in Mesolithic activity in comparison to Strangford Lough and Belfast Lough, due to the low quality flint.

Carlingford and the Mournes could also have provided berries and nuts in season, and wild boar. A local population survived at Rockmarshall into the Neolithic, and the court cairn was built c. 3500 BC.

== Description ==
The gallery is 15 m (49 ft) long and at the northeast end is a broad court, its arc formed by six stones. The stones used are very low and some have fallen over. There are five chambers with each chamber narrower than the first. There is a lot of cairn material scattered around the gallery.
