= Mansfieldstown Church =

St. Mary's Church, Mansfieldstown
- Mansfieldstown Church
- Eaglais Mhuire
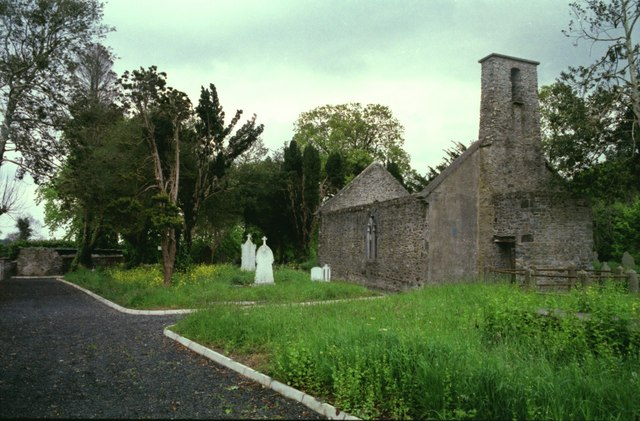

- Location within Ireland
- 53.896892°N 6.445712°W
- Location: Mansfieldstown, Castlebellingham, County Louth
- Country: Ireland
- Denomination: Church of Ireland
- Previous denomination: Catholic

History
- Dedication: Mary, mother of Jesus

Architecture
- Functional status: inactive
- Heritage designation

National monument of Ireland
- Official name: Mansfieldstown Church
- Reference no.: 480
- Style: Late Gothic
- Completed: 1691

Specifications
- Materials: Rubble stone

Administration
- Diocese: Armagh

St. Mary's Church, Mansfieldstown is a medieval church and National Monument in County Louth, Ireland.

== Location ==
Mansfieldstown Church is located 3.7 km (2.3 mi) west of Castlebellingham, on the north bank of the River Glyde.

== History ==
The townland name is derived from the Anglo-Norman Maundeville family who settled here after 1172. The earliest reference to a church here is in the Papal Registers of 1299. Archbishop Richard FitzRalph delivered a sermon at Mansfieldstown in 1349, in the midst of the Black Death. The church was recorded as ruined in 1640.

Mansfieldstown Old Church was built in 1691, after the Battle of the Boyne, but incorporates a 15th-century Late Gothic east window. There were many alterations and additions made in the 19th century. A large, decorated, c. 15th-century baptismal font once stood here; it is now in St. Mary's Parish Church, Ardee.

Anthony Vinchon Des Voeux (1710–92) was rector at Mansfieldstown from 1781 to his death in 1792. He was born in France, son of the President of the Parlement of Rouen, and wrote in defence of the Huguenot faith. He was chaplain to George Germain, 1st Viscount Sackville's 6th Regiment. His son Charles became a baronet in 1787, the first of the Des Voeux baronets.

== Church ==
Mansfieldstown Church is an undivided nave and chancel with a bell-cote at the west end. The Late Gothic east window has tracery. It has two stone masks as label-stops with a third mask at the apex.
