= Aghnaskeagh Cairns =

Irish monument

- Carna Áth na Sceach (Irish)
- Location within Ireland
- 54.061279°N 6.357918°W
- Type: chambered cairns
- Periods: Neolithic
- Location: Aghnaskeagh, Jenkinstown, County Louth, Ireland
- Region: Cooley Peninsula

History
- Built: c. 4000–2500 BC

Site notes
- Material: limestone
- Archaeologists: Emyr Estyn Evans
- Public access: yes

National monument of Ireland
- Official name: Aghnaskeagh
- Reference no.: 326

Aghnaskeagh Cairns is a chambered cairn and portal tomb forming a national monument in County Louth, Ireland.

== Location ==
Aghnaskeagh Cairns are located 2.1 km (1.3 mi) south of Slieve Foy, to the west of the N1.

== History and archaeology ==
The two cairns may have been connected by a gallery.

=== Portal tomb ===
The northern cairn is a dolmen (portal tomb) with the capstone missing. Two portal stones (2.8 m / 9 ft high) and a back stone remain. Six Bronze Age cist burials were later added. Archeologists found potsherds, cremated bone, food vessels and a blue glass bead on the site, as well as the remains of blackberries under one of the cists, presumably as grave-goods.

=== Chambered cairn ===
The southern cairn is a chambered cairn with four cists at the eastern end. Excavations revealed cremated bone, potsherds and scrapers. A burial was also made here in the early Christian era.
