= Donaghmore Souterrain =

- Uaimh Thalún an Domhnaigh Mhóir (Irish)
- Chart of the souterrain, from Thomas Wright's Louthiana

- Location within Ireland
- 54.002939°N 6.459380°W
- Type: souterrain
- Cultures: Gaelic Ireland
- Location: Donaghmore Kilcurly, Dundalk, County Louth, Ireland
- Region: Castletown River Valley

History
- Built: between AD 700 and 1200

Site notes
- Material: stone
- Archaeologists: Etienne Ryan
- Condition: excellent
- Owner: private
- Public access: yes

National monument of Ireland
- Official name: Donaghmore Souterrain
- Reference no.: 526

Donaghmore Souterrain is a souterrain and National Monument located in County Louth, Ireland.

== Location ==
Donaghmore Souterrain is located 3.6 km (2.2 mi) west of Dundalk, near a cluster of houses.

== History ==
Souterrains are cave-like structures built as places of refuge and storage, and in Ireland they date between the 8th and 12th centuries.

The souterrain was discovered in 1960 during the construction of a Louth County Council cottage. It was excavated by Etienne Rynne who found trenches, a pit, two post-holes, sherds of souterrain ware, a bronze pin, a whetstone and iron slag.

== Description ==
The souterrain at Donaghmore is a complex of tunnels lined with dry stone walls, floors and ceilings, with corbels and lintels. The ceilings are over 1 m (3 ft 3 in) in height and the total length of tunnel is 80 m (260 ft). It is largely dug into boulder clay but also into Silurian grit.
