= Monasterboice =

6th century monastery in County Louth, Ireland

- Mainistir Bhuithe
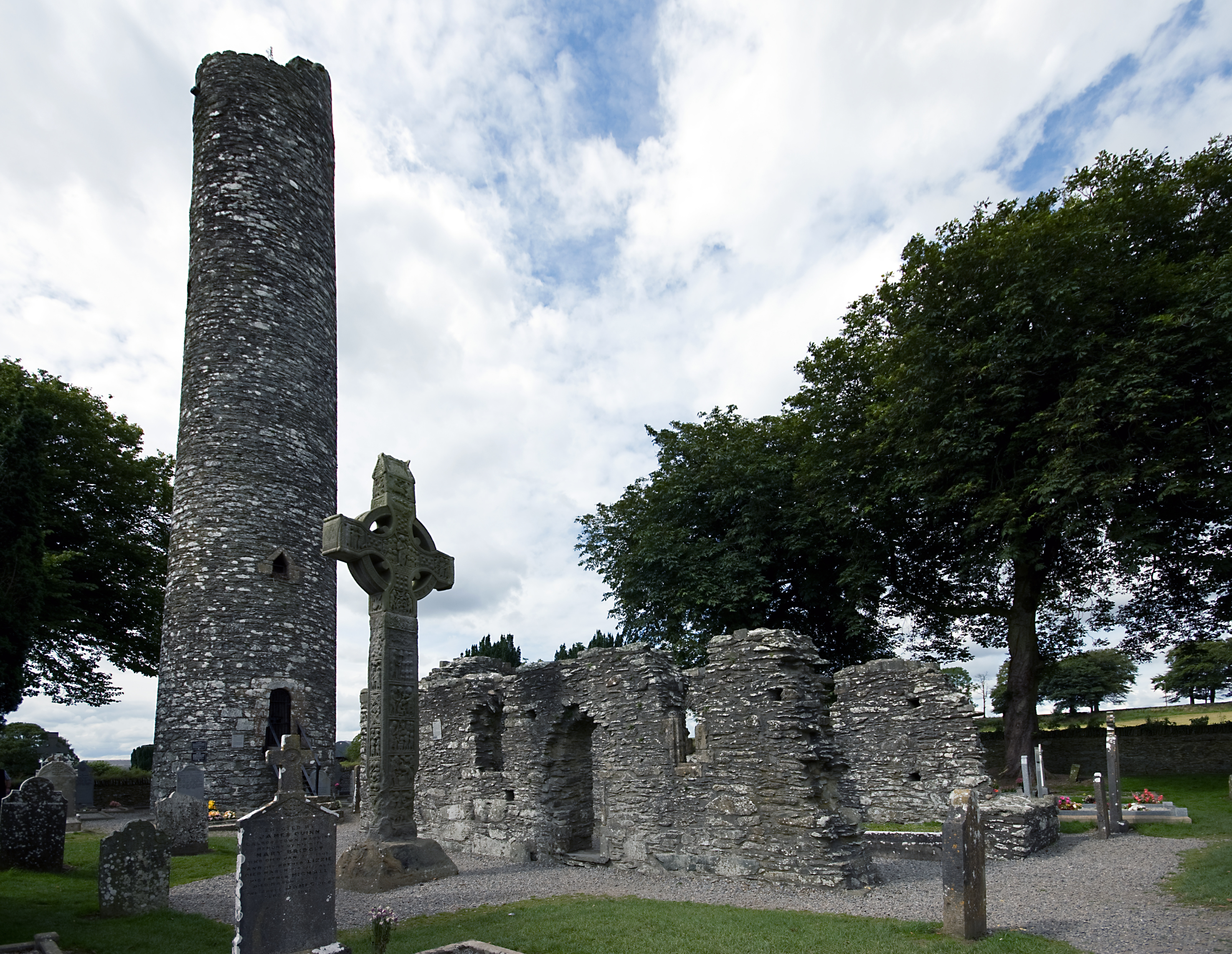
- Round tower, high cross, church and gravestones at Monasterboice

- Location within Ireland
- Interactive map of Monasterboice

Monastery information
- Established: 5th century
- Disestablished: 1097

People
- Founder: Saint Buithe (Saint Buithe mac Bronach)

Site
- Location: County Louth, Ireland
- Coordinates: 53°46′39.53″N 6°25′02.43″W
- Public access: yes

The Monasterboice (Irish: Mainistir Bhuithe) ruins are the remains of an early Christian monastic settlement in County Louth in Ireland, north of Drogheda. The ruins are a national monument of Ireland and also give their name to the local village and to a civil parish of the same name.

== Name ==
The name Monasterboice is a part-anglicisation of the Irish name Mainistir Bhuithe meaning "monastery of Buithe". It was formerly anglicised as Monasterboye and Monasterboyse. Boice is the English version of the Latin name Boecius, which was adopted as the equivalent of the Irish Buithe.

== History ==
The monastic settlement was founded in the late 5th century by Saint Buithe (or Buite) who died around 521.

Poet and historian Flann Mainistrech, Flann of Monasterboice, was lector here.

Little is known about the monastery except for a list of abbots (759–1122). It fell into ruin after the establishment of the Cistercian Mellifont Abbey nearby in 1142.

A parochial church was in use at the location by the 13th century.

== Description ==
The site includes the remains of two churches built in the 14th century or later and an earlier round tower, but it is most famous for its high crosses. The round tower is about 28 metres tall, and is in very good condition. It was likely built shortly after 968 and damaged in a fire in 1098. The three high crosses date from the 10th century and form part of the scriptural group (showing biblical scenes).

The 5.5-metre Muiredach's High Cross is regarded as the finest high cross in the whole of Ireland. It is named after an abbot, Muiredach mac Domhnaill, who died in 923 and features biblical carvings of both the Old (Adam and Eve) and New Testaments (the Adoration of the Magi) of the Bible. The North and West crosses are also notable examples of this kind of structure, but these have suffered much more from the effects of the weather. A copy of the main cross is held in the Victoria and Albert Museum in London.

== Today ==
The property is owned by the National Monuments Service and is accessible to the public.

Burials in the graveyard around the ruins continue in the present day.

== Gallery ==
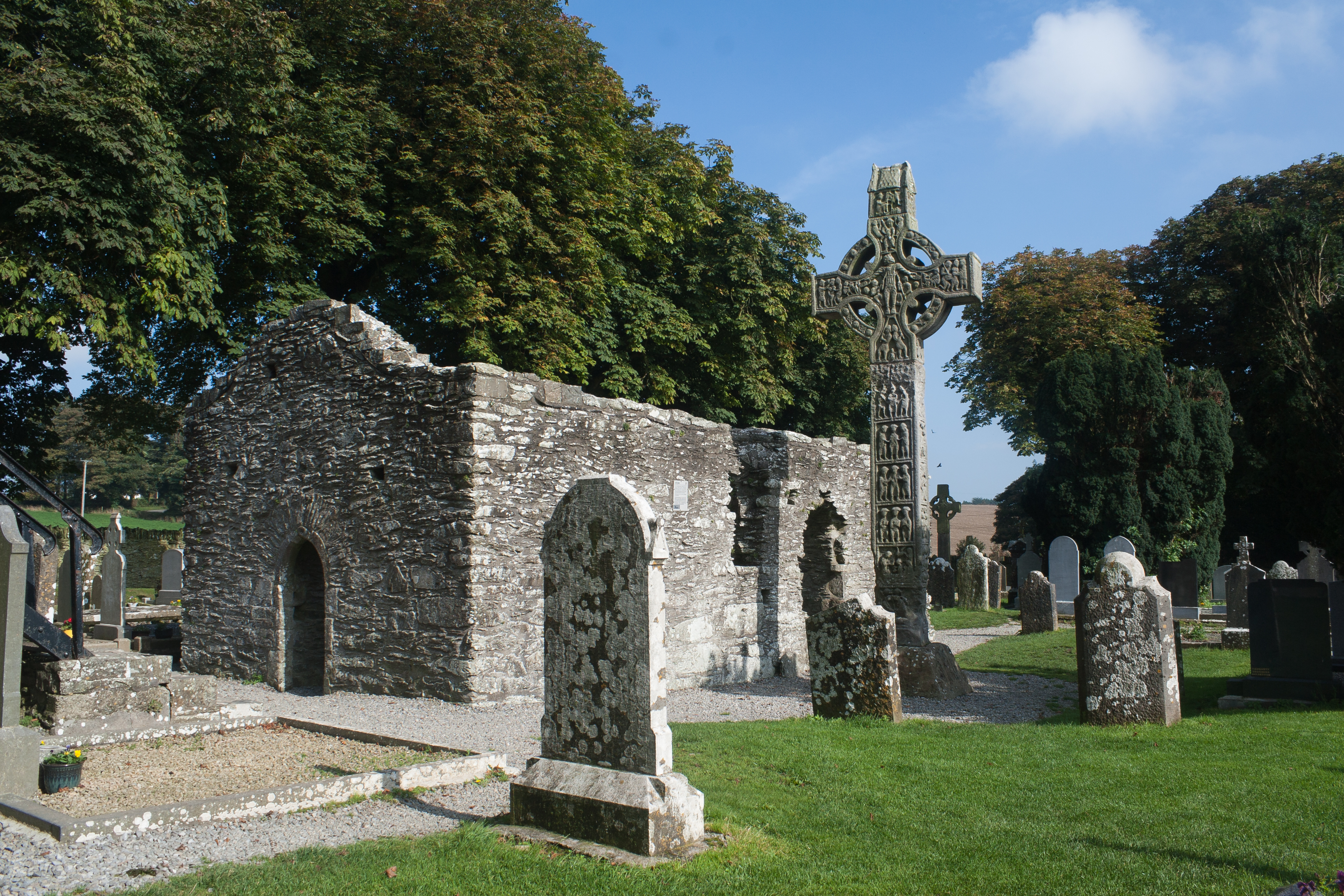
North church and West Cross

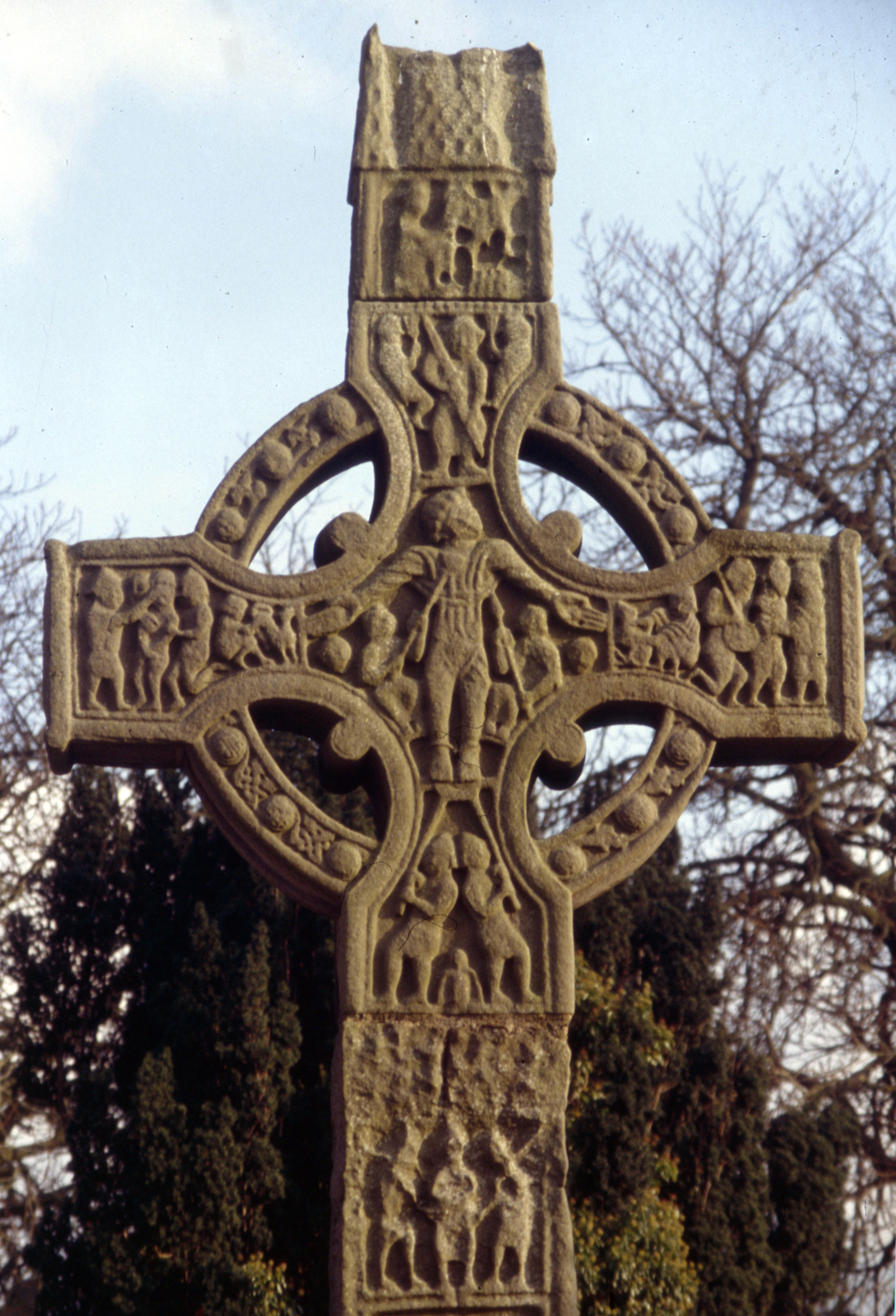
West Cross

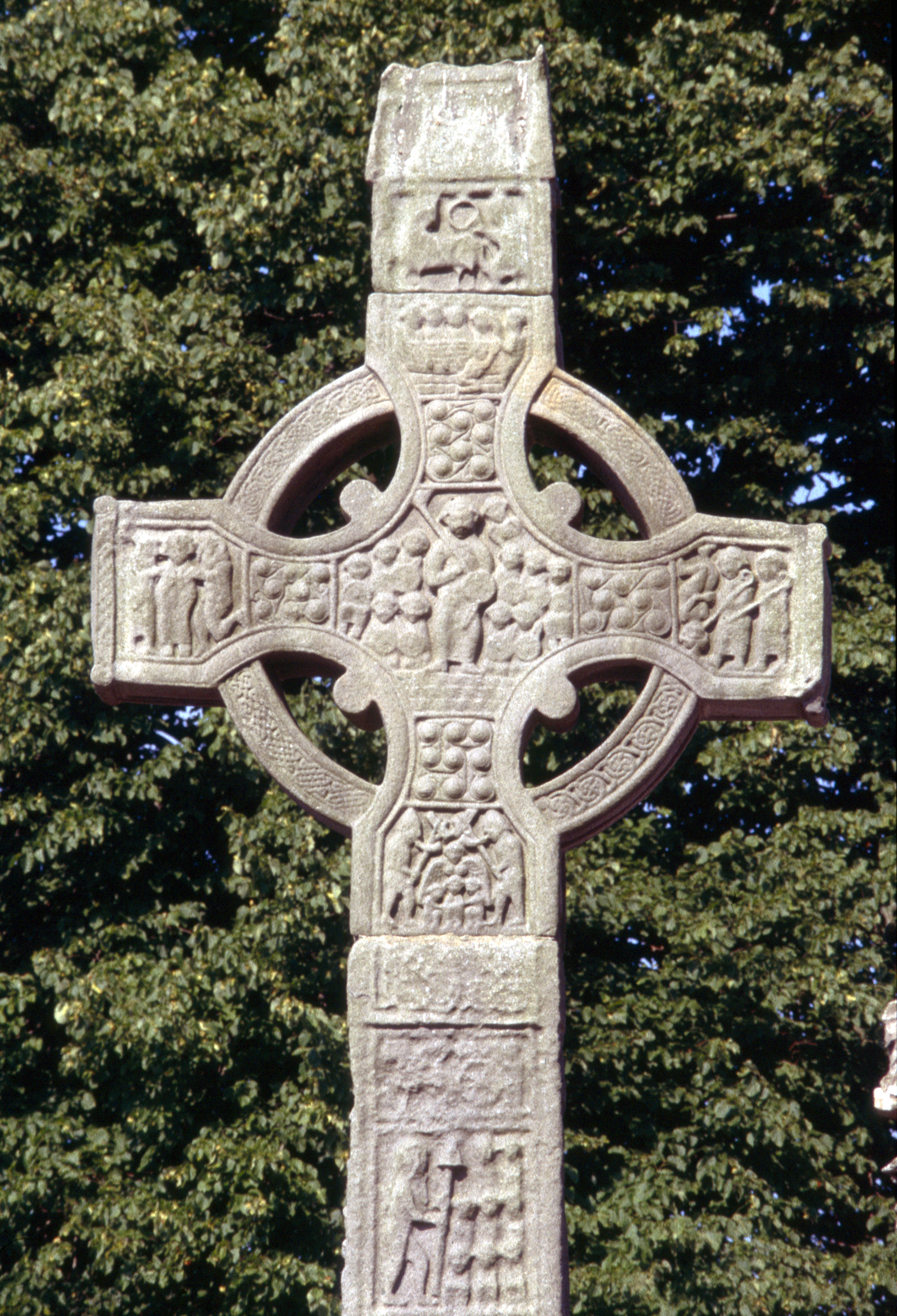
East Cross

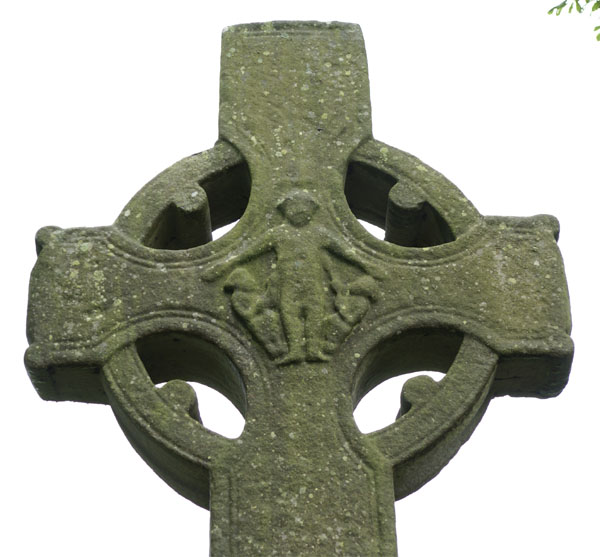
North Cross, close-up

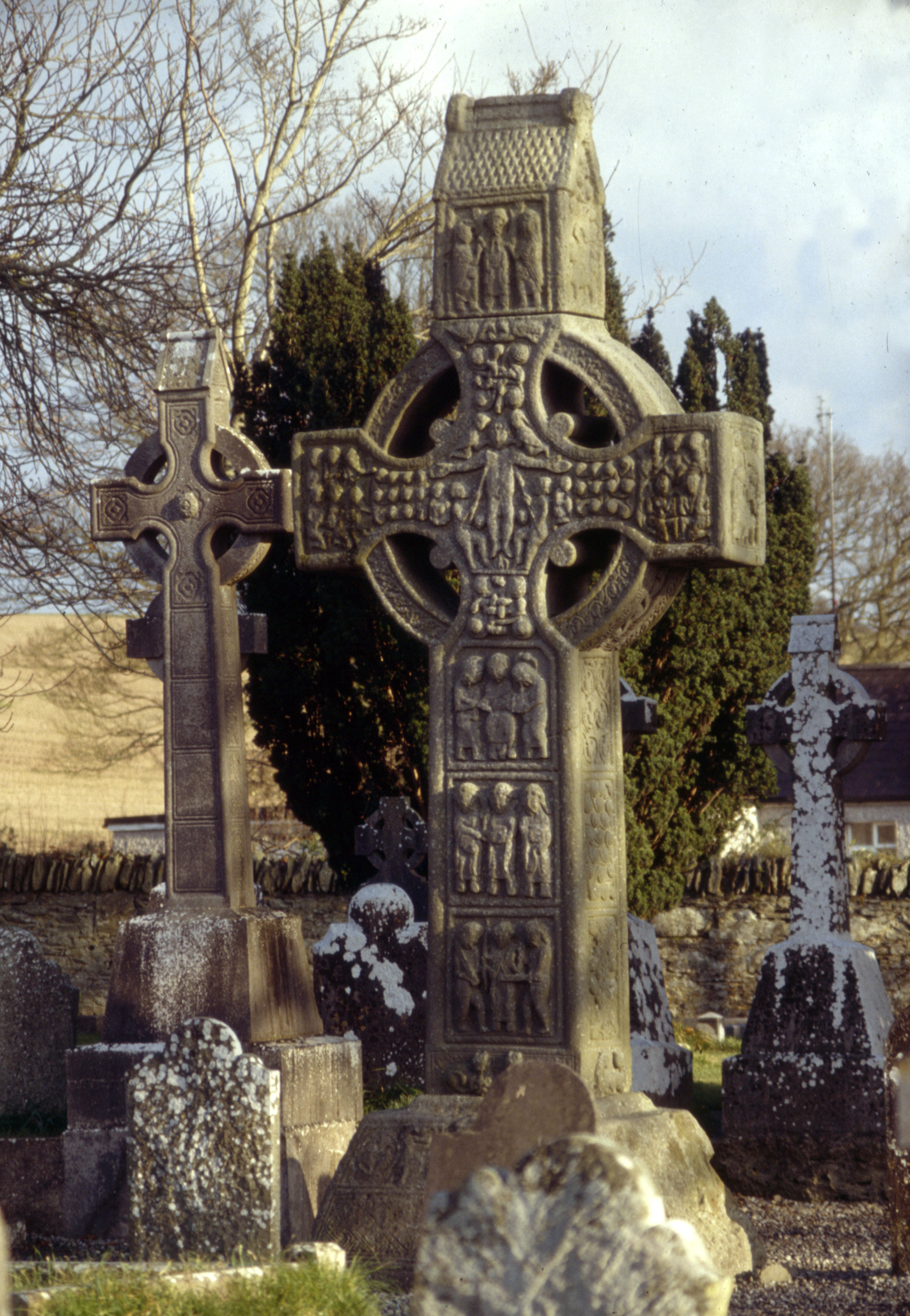
Muiredach's Cross
