= List of motte-and-bailey castles =

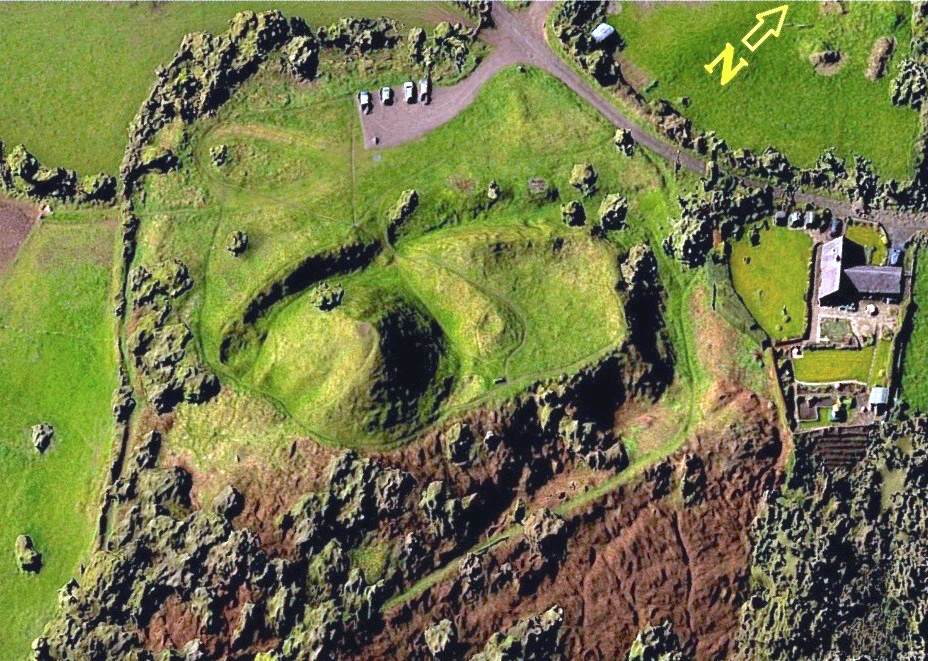
Castle Pulverbatch in Shropshire was built in the 11th or 12th century and abandoned by 1202. This digital elevation model shows the motte just left of centre, with the bailey to the right (north-east) of it.

A motte-and-bailey is a form of castle, with a wooden or stone keep situated on a raised earthwork called a motte, accompanied by an enclosed courtyard, or bailey, surrounded by a protective ditch and palisade. Relatively easy to build with unskilled, often forced labour, but still militarily formidable, these castles were built across northern Europe from the 10th century onwards, spreading from Normandy and Anjou in France, into the Holy Roman Empire in the 11th century. The Normans introduced the design into England and Wales following their invasion in 1066. Motte-and-bailey castles were adopted in Scotland, Ireland, the Low Countries and Denmark in the 12th and 13th centuries. By the end of the 13th century, the design was largely superseded by alternative forms of fortification, but the earthworks remain a prominent feature in many countries.

== Belgium ==
- Gravensteen

== France ==
- Château de Gisors

== Ireland ==
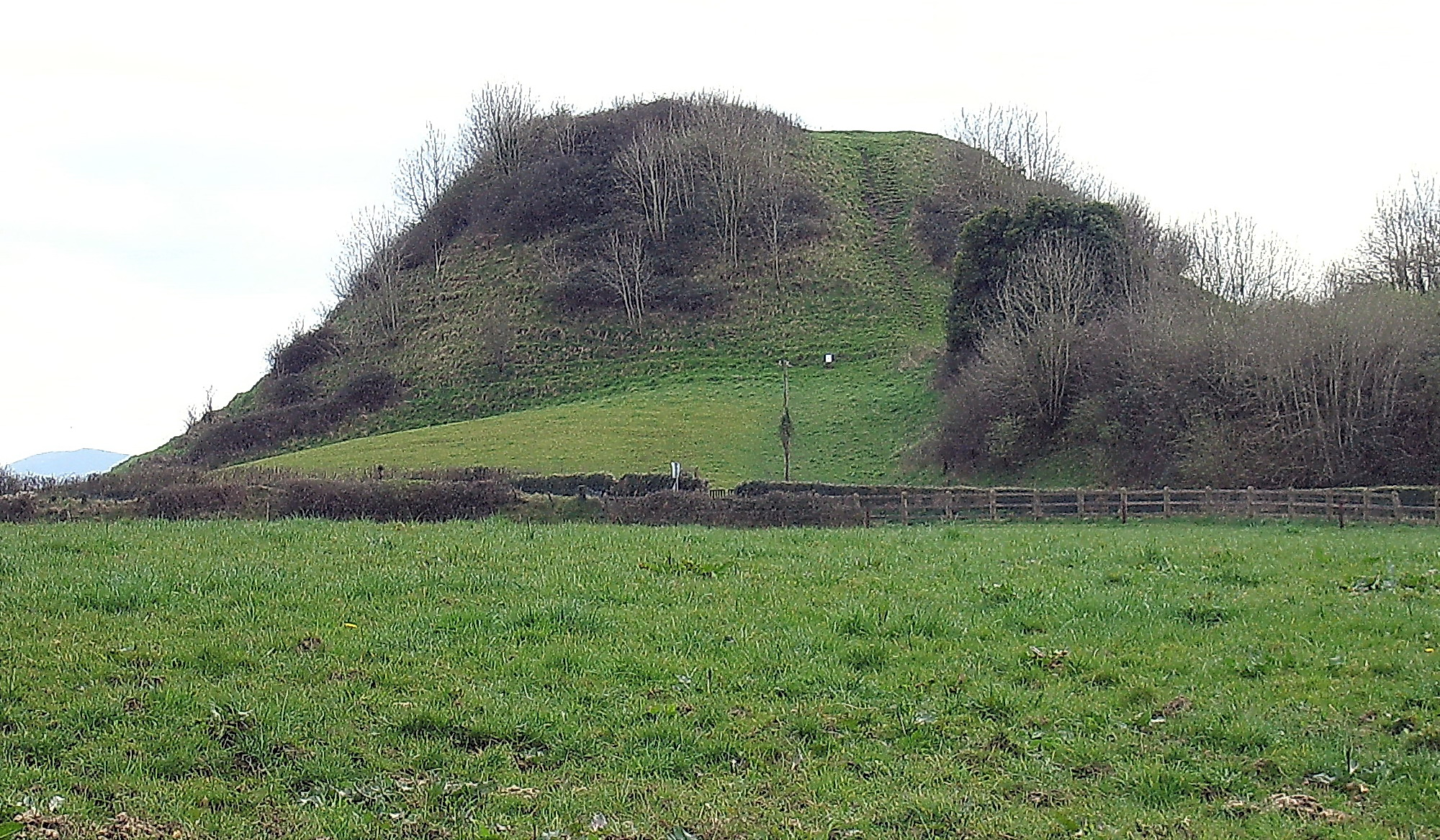
The motte, at Knockgraffon, New Inn in County Tipperary, Ireland

- Ballymoty Motte
- Belturbet
- Callan Motte
- Castleruddery Motte
- Clough Castle
- Coleraine Castle
- Dún Dealgan Motte
- Gortlownan Motte
- Granard Motte
- Greencastle
- Greenmount Motte
- Knockgraffon
- Lemonstown Motte
- Portlick Motte
- Rathgarve Motte & Bailey
- Roscrea Castle

== Middle East ==
- Castle of Smar Jbeil

== South Italy and Sicily ==
- Specchia Torricella near Supersano (Apulia)
- Castle of Arechi (Salerno, Campania)
- San Marco Argentano (Calabria)
- Aci Castello (Sicily)
- Motta Sant'Anastasia (Sicily)
- Petralia Soprana (Sicily)

== The Netherlands ==
- Burcht van Leiden

== United Kingdom ==
=== England ===
A study by castellologist D. J. Cathcart King published in 1972 listed 473 mottes in England.

- Aldford Castle, Cheshire
- Alnwick Castle, Northumberland
- Arundel Castle, West Sussex
- Baile Hill, North Yorkshire
- Bedford Castle, Bedfordshire
- Berkeley Castle, Gloucestershire
- Berkhamsted Castle, Hertfordshire
- Berwick Castle, Berwick-Upon-Tweed
- Brinklow Castle, Warwickshire
- Carisbrooke Castle, Isle of Wight
- Castle Acre Castle, Norfolk
- Castle Neroche, Somerset
- Caus Castle, Shropshire
- Chartley Castle, Staffordshire
- Christchurch Castle, Dorset
- Clare Castle, Suffolk
- Clifford Castle, Herefordshire
- Clitheroe Castle, Lancashire
- Corfe Castle, Dorset
- Cuckney Castle, Nottinghamshire
- Cymbeline's Castle, Buckinghamshire
- Dorstone Castle, Herefordshire
- Dudley Castle, West Midlands
- Durham Castle, County Durham
- Eardisland Castle, Herefordshire
- Eardisley Castle, Herefordshire
- Edburton Castle Ring, West Sussex
- Ewyas Harold Castle, Herefordshire
- Eye Castle, Suffolk
- Farnham Castle, Surrey
- Fenny Castle, Somerset
- FitzHarris Castle, Oxfordshire
- Fotheringhay Castle, Northamptonshire
- Hastings Castle, Sussex
- Kilpeck Castle, Herefordshire
- Launceston Castle, Cornwall
- Lewes Castle, East Sussex
- Leafield Castle, Oxfordshire
- Lincoln Castle, Lincolnshire
- Longtown Castle, Herefordshire
- Montacute Castle, Somerset
- Nether Stowey, Somerset
- Norwich Castle, Norfolk
- Nottingham Castle, Nottinghamshire
- Okehampton Castle, Devon
- Old Sarum Castle, Wiltshire
- Ongar Castle, Essex
- Oxford Castle, Oxfordshire
- Pickering Castle, North Yorkshire
- Pinxton Castle, Derbyshire
- Pleshey Castle, Essex
- Reigate Castle, Surrey
- Sandal Castle, West Yorkshire
- Skipsea Castle, East Yorkshire
- Stafford Castle, Staffordshire
- Stansted Mountfitchet Castle, Essex
- Tamworth Castle, Staffordshire
- Thetford Castle, Norfolk
- Tonbridge Castle, Kent
- Totnes Castle, Devon
- Totternhoe Castle, Bedfordshire
- Tutbury Castle, Staffordshire
- Wallingford Castle, now in Oxfordshire, previously Berkshire
- Warkworth Castle, Northumberland
- Warwick Castle, Warwickshire
- Windsor Castle, Berkshire
- York Castle, Yorkshire

=== Scotland ===
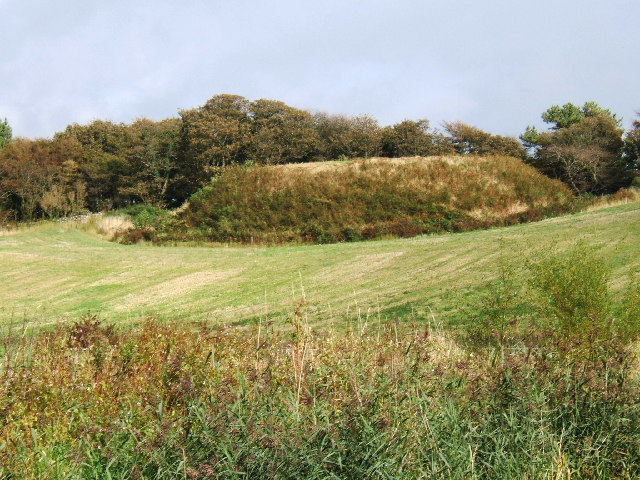
Motte at Ardwell, Dumfries and Galloway, Scotland

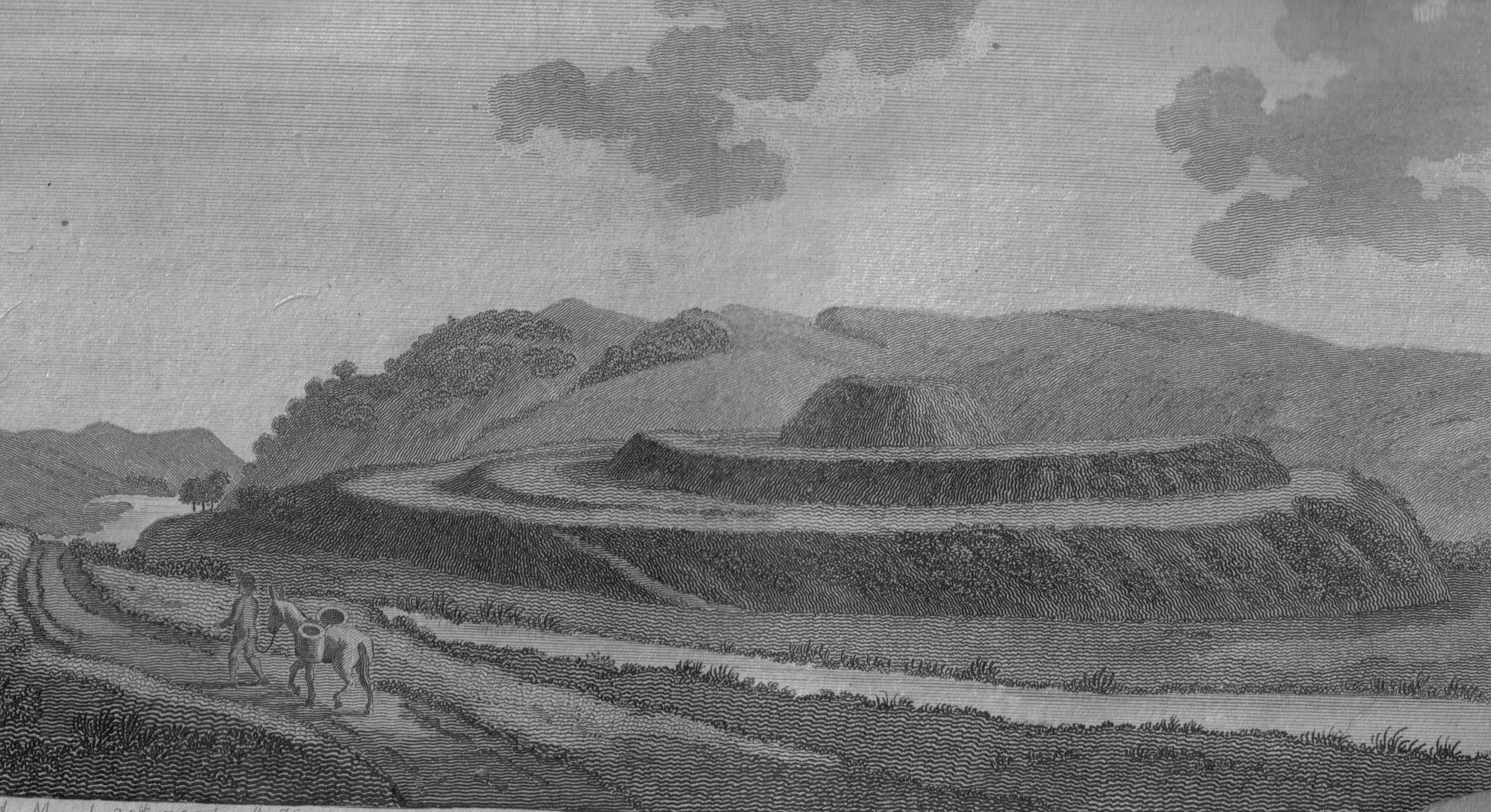
Mote of Urr, Dumfries and Galloway

Canmore has records for 47 motte-and-bailey castles in Scotland.

- Doune of Invernochty, Aberdeenshire
- Bass of Inverurie, Inverurie
- Duffus Castle, Moray
- Cumbernauld Castle, Cumbernauld
- Hermitage Castle, Liddesdale
- Liddel Castle, Liddesdale
- Motte of Urr, Dumfries and Galloway
- Tibbers Castle, Dumfries and Galloway

=== Northern Ireland ===
- Dromore Castle
- Moat Hill, Dundonald

=== Wales ===
A 1972 study found 268 mottes in Wales.

- Castell Aberlleiniog
- Buddugre Castle
- Cardiff Castle
- Lampeter Castle
- Llandovery Castle
- Mold Castle
- Montgomery or Hen Domen
- Morganstown Castle Mound
- New Radnor
- Prestatyn Castle
- The Rofft
- Ruperra Motte
- St Quentins Castle
- Tomen Castell
- Twmpath Castle
- Wiston Castle
- Wolfscastle
