= Jbeil (disambiguation) =

Jbeil may refer to:

- Byblos, the Greek name for a city in modern-day Lebanon known by its Arabic name Jbeil
- Byblos District, the district surrounding Byblos
- Bint Jbeil ("daughter of Byblos"), town in Lebanon
- Smar Jbeil, town in Lebanon
