= Ruperra Motte =

Ruperra Motte Craig Ruperra Motte
- Castell Breiniol or Castell y Ddraenen (Welsh)
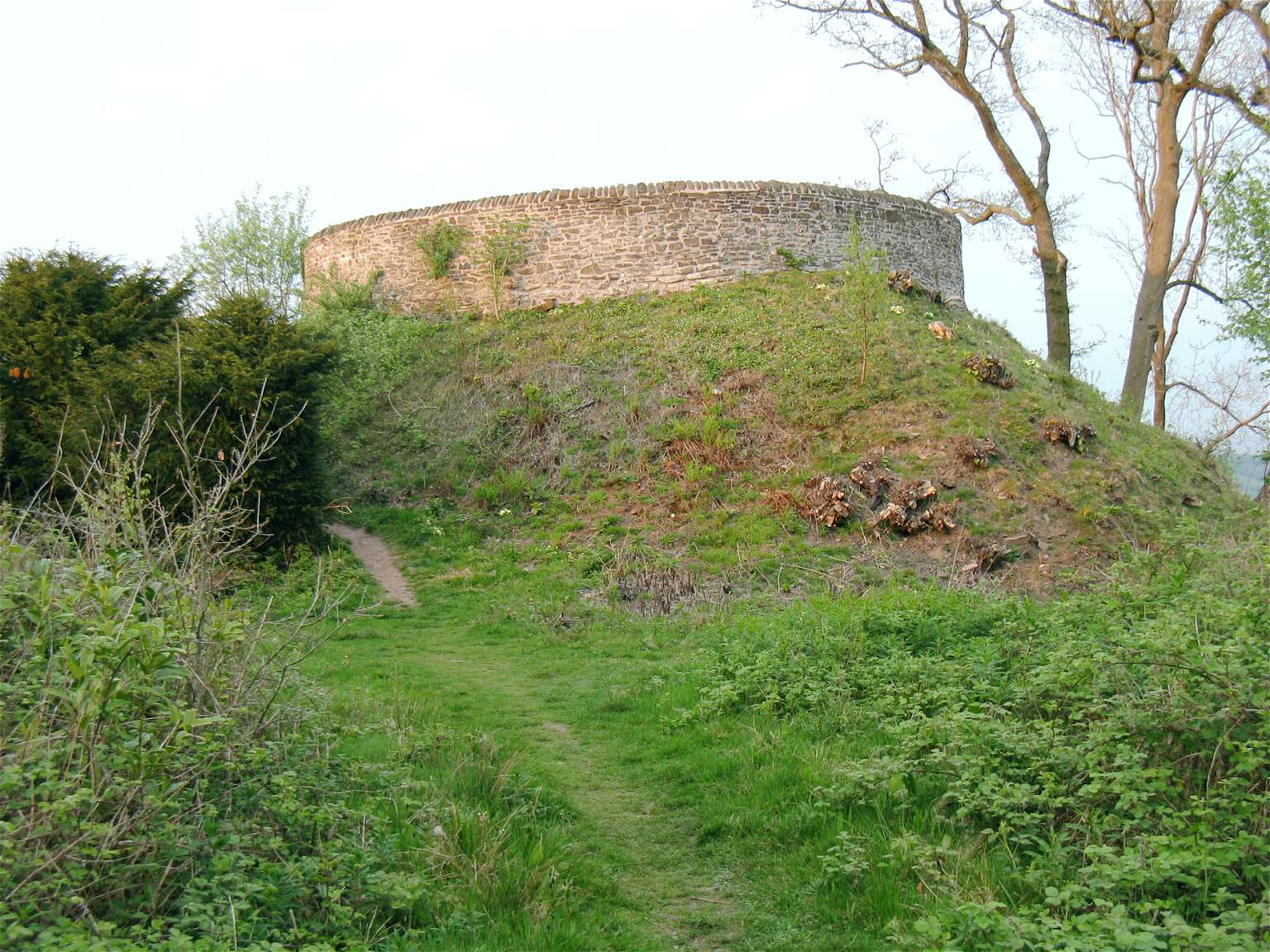
- The Ruperra Motte in April 2011

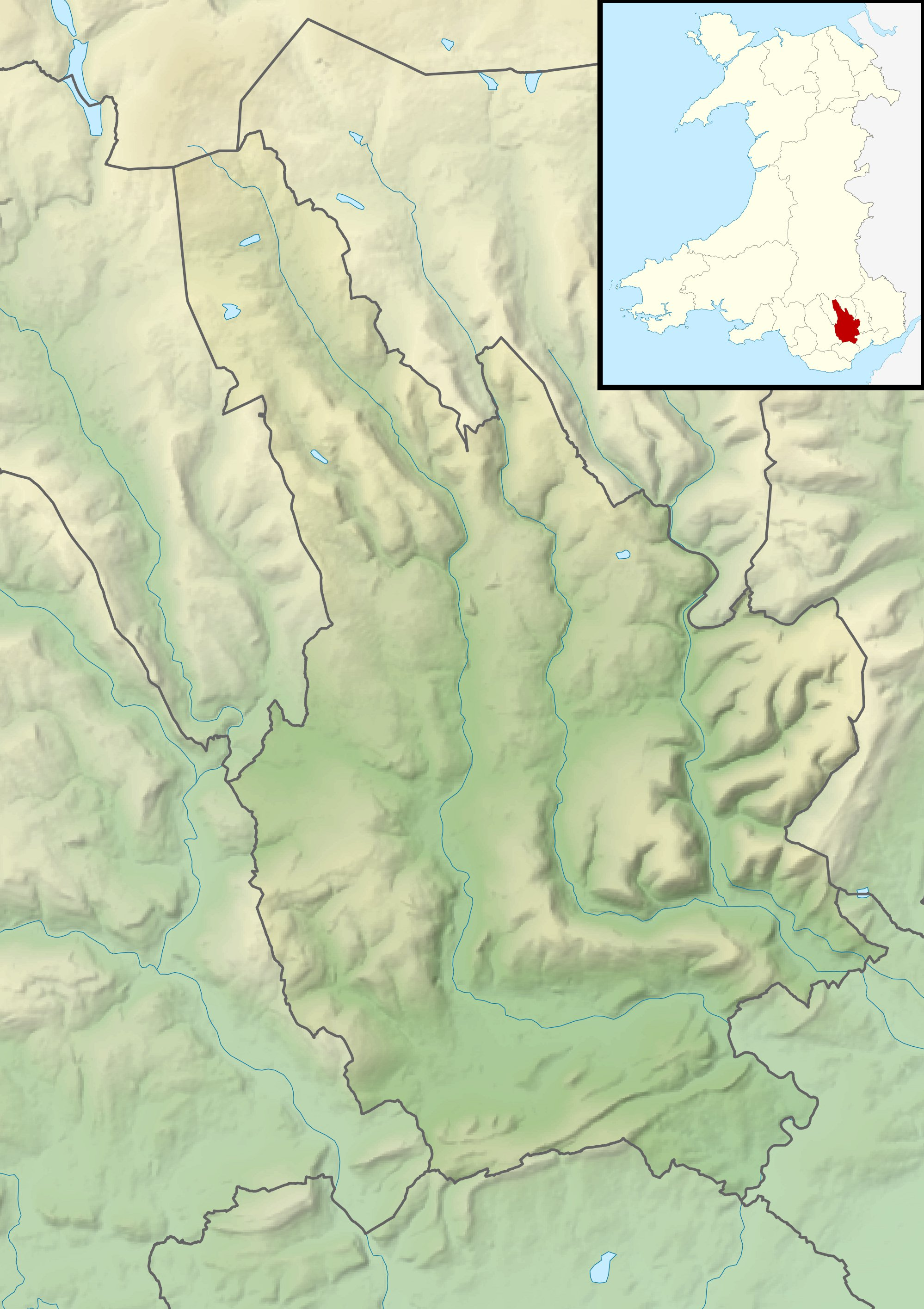
- Location in the Caerphilly County Borough
- 51.57374°N 3.12208°W
- Type: Motte-and-bailey castle
- Location: Rudry, Caerphilly, Wales
- Nearest city: Newport

Scheduled monument
- Official name: Ruperra Hillfort and Motte
- Designated: 3 December 1997; 28 years ago
- Reference no.: GM511

Ruperra Motte, also known as Craig Ruperra Motte, (Welsh: Castell Breiniol, or Castell y Ddraenen) is a medieval motte and bailey castle in the community of Rudry close to the village of Draethen in the Caerphilly County Borough on the border with Newport in south east Wales. It is a Scheduled Monument within the Grade II listed Registered Historic Park & Garden, which also includes Ruperra Castle.

== History ==
Ruperra Motte is a medieval motte and bailey castle which sits on an earlier Iron Age hillfort, called Craig Ruperra Hillfort. It was built about 1100 as a Norman type motte or castle. On the top of the motte stood a wooden castle. Ruperra Motte lies on the top of the Coed Craig Ruperra ridge, and was built in that location because of the view of the surrounding area. It is thought to have been part of the Norman invasion of south east Wales. However, it fell into disuse when the larger Caerphilly Castle was built in 1274.

From Coed Craig Ruperra to Tongwynlais lies three castles, Morgraig Castle, the early motte at Castell Coch, and Ruperra Motte.

== Present day ==
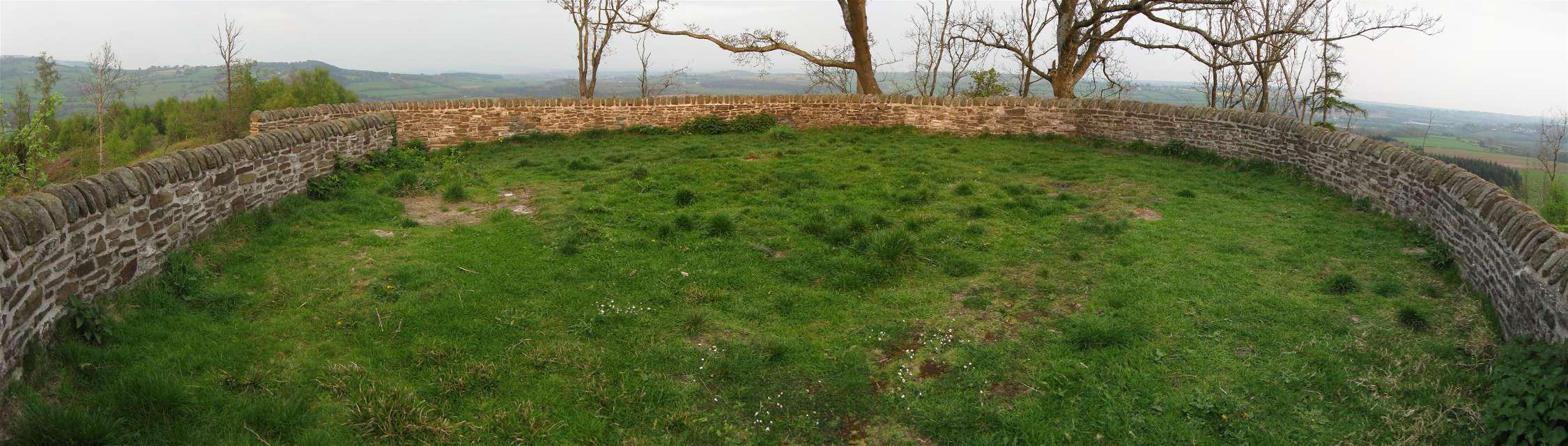
On the top of Ruperra Motte

Since 2000, Coed Craig Ruperra, which includes the Ruperra Motte, has been owned by Ruperra Conservation Trust. Nothing now remains above ground of the castle's original wooden buildings. The motte today stands 6 metres high with a diameter of 12 metres at the top. Cadw, which works to protect the historic buildings and structures in Wales, says that "The site is of national importance as a multi-period defensive site, with well preserved remains of a hillfort, motte and 18th century garden features. The site is well preserved and retains considerable archaeological potential". The motte is a Scheduled Monument within the Grade II listed Registered Historic Park & Garden, which also includes Ruperra Castle.

== See also ==
- List of castles in Wales
- Castles in Great Britain and Ireland
- List of scheduled monuments in Caerphilly
- List of motte-and-bailey castles
