= Castle of Smar Jbeil =

Medieval Crusader castle in Lebanon

- قلعة سمار جبيل (Arabic)
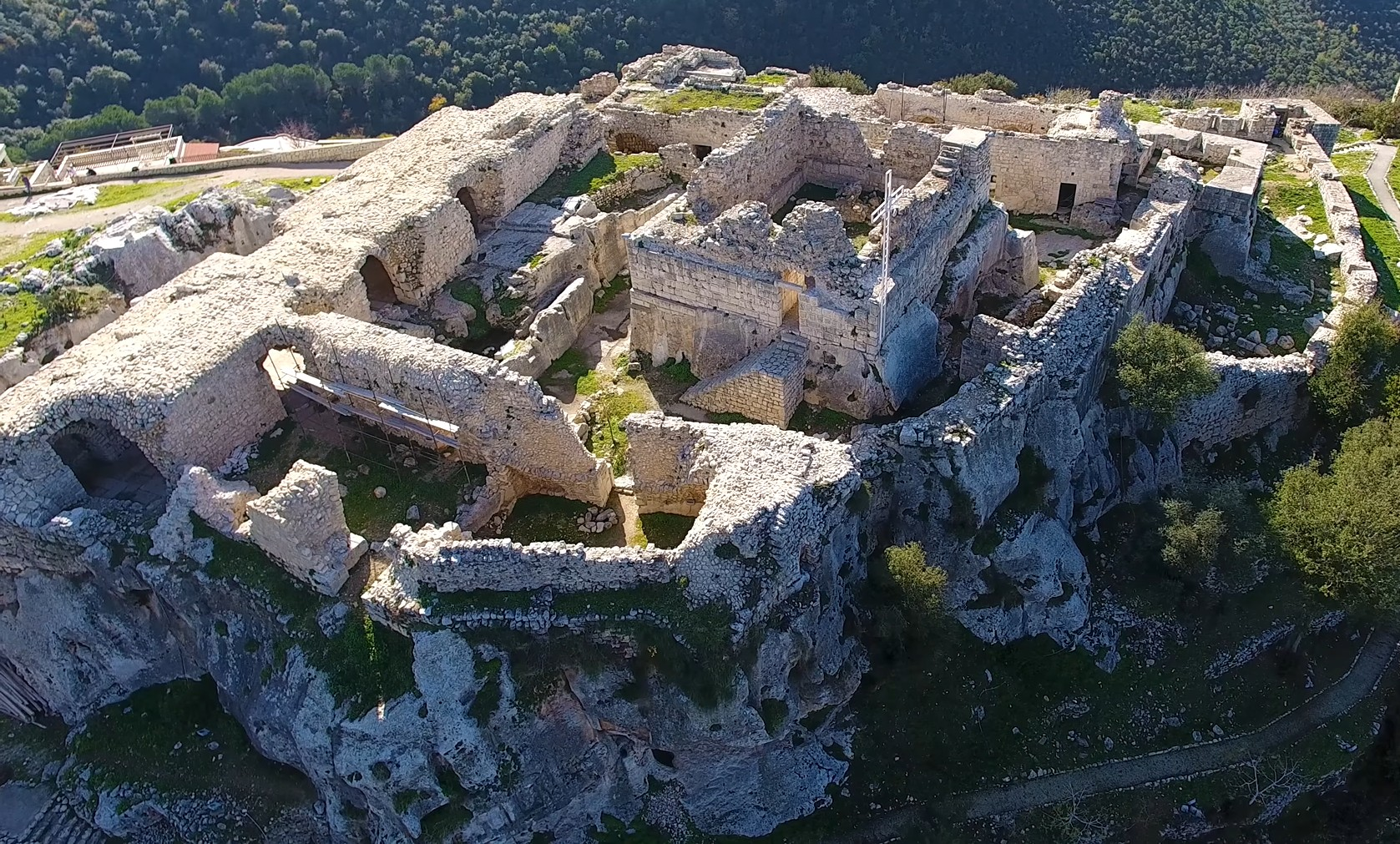
- Aerial view of the castle of Smar Jbeil

- Location within Lebanon
- 34.2175°N 35.6880°E
- Location: Smar Jbeil, Caza of Batroun, Lebanon

History
- Built: Twelfth century

Site notes
- Architectural style: Crusader
- Governing body: Directorate General of Antiquities

The castle of Smar Jbeil is a medieval stronghold located in the village of Smar Jbeil in the Batroun district of Lebanon. The castle stands on a rocky promontory overlooking Nahr al-Madfoun (Madfoun River). It is a small tower-and-bailey castle with a rock-cut ditch, built during the Crusader period; it served as a feudal stronghold within the County of Tripoli.

Built in three phases during the 12th century by the Franks, the castle is surrounded by curtain walls, four corner towers, two mid-wall towers, and a barbican defending its entrance. Structures including a chapel, a great hall, a stable, storerooms, and an elevated central donjon tower stood within its walls. A 2019 Polish archaeological mission has interpreted the castle as the seat of a knight holding the surrounding land as a fief. Its strategic position afforded views of the Mediterranean, the Mount Lebanon range, and the surrounding districts of Batroun and Jbeil. No contemporary Crusader-period records mention the castle, and its Latin name has not been identified. Surveys at the site have revealed evidence of earlier occupation spanning the Bronze Age and Roman periods, including a necropolis, funerary bas-reliefs, and rock-cut cisterns that predate the Crusader fortifications.

The County of Tripoli fell to the Mamluk Sultanate in 1289, as the Mamluks swept across the Lebanese coast, capturing Batroun and its surrounding settlements. They destroyed the fortresses and fortifications they seized, causing most to be abandoned. By 1619, the castle was held by men loyal to the Sayfa family; that year, the Ottoman-era Druze Emir Fakhr al-Din II secured their defection during his conflict with the Sayfas, bringing the castle under his control, after which the Khazin family established their residence there. An earthquake in 1630 caused significant damage to the donjon and a lower vault; the castle was subsequently restored in 1631. During the 19th century, it served as the seat of the Maronite bishopric. The donjon tower remained the property of the Maronite Church until its expropriation by the Lebanese Directorate General of Antiquities in 1997. The castle is managed as an un-ticketed heritage site and is open to the public free of charge.

== Location and etymology ==
The castle is built on a rocky promontory in the town of Smar Jbeil, (Note: Also referred to in sources as Esmor Jbeil, Semar-Gébeil, Semar Dejebeil, Samar Jubayl, Smār Jbayl, Smar Djebeil.) on the western foothills of Mount Lebanon. It is about 5 kilometres (3.1 mi) southeast of Batroun, 18 kilometres (11 mi) away from Jbeil (ancient Byblos), around and 59 kilometres (37 mi) north of Beirut. The castle stands at 400 metres (1,300 ft) above sea level and overlooks Nahr al-Madfoun (Madfoun River).

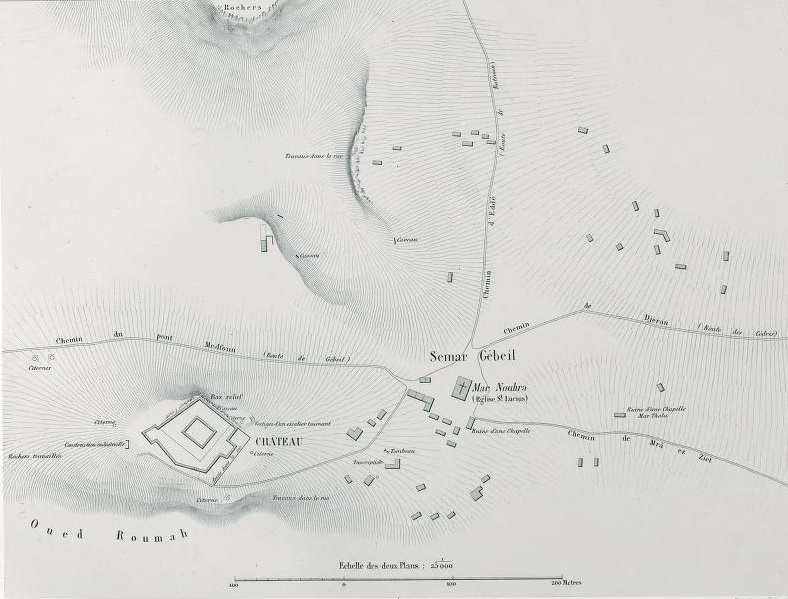
Map of Smar Jbeil from Renan's 1864 Mission de Phénicie, showing the town in relation to the castle

According to the Lebanese scholar Anis Furayhah, the name Smar Jbeil is a distorted form of an ancient Semitic name stemming from the Phoenician 𐤔𐤌𐤓, š-m-r, 'guard / watcher', so that the place name translates as "the guardian" or "watcher of Jbeil", reflecting its strategic role as a protective stronghold for the city of Jbeil. He also proposed that the name may be composed of three Phoenician words: Sēm (grave), Mār (master or lord), and Jbeil, yielding the meaning "the tombs of the kings of Jbeil". The Latin name of the castle is unknown, as it does not appear in contemporary records from the Crusader period.

== History ==
=== Historical background ===
A map of the Crusader states of Edessa, Antioch, Tripoli, and Jerusalem, in 1135, shortly before the Second Crusade

Christian and Muslim states had been in conflict since the latter's founding in the seventh century. During the century following the death of the Islamic prophet Muhammad in 632, Muslim forces captured Jerusalem and the Levant, North Africa, and most of the Iberian Peninsula, all of which had previously been under Christian rule. By the eleventh century, Christians were gradually reversing Islamic control of Iberia through the Reconquista, but ties to the Levant had deteriorated due to ongoing conflict over Palestine between the Seljuks and the Fatimids. In Western Europe, Jerusalem was increasingly regarded as worthy of penitential pilgrimages (journeys undertaken to atone for sins). Returning pilgrims reported difficulties and the oppression of Christians, and the Byzantine need for military support coincided with an increase in the willingness of the western European warrior class to accept papal military command.

In March 1095, the Byzantine emperor Alexios I Komnenos sought help from Pope Urban II against the Seljuk Turks, who had taken over much of Anatolia. Pope Urban II consequently launched an armed pilgrimage, later known as the First Crusade, citing at the Council of Clermont in November 1095 the goals of liberating Jerusalem and the Holy Sepulchre from Muslim control and supporting the Byzantine Empire. The Crusader presence in Lebanon began in 1099 during the First Crusade, marked by the siege of Arqa. In 1102, Raymond of Saint-Gilles occupied Tartus and initiated the conquest of the Tripoli region, constructing the castle of Mont-Pèlerin to blockade the city. By 1109, his son had seized Tripoli, as well as Arqa and Jbeil, establishing the County of Tripoli, one of the four Latin states created by the Crusaders in the Levant following the capture of Jerusalem in 1099. To secure their newly acquired territories, the Franks built a network of fortifications, including the citadel of Tripoli, Gibelacar (ʻAkkar el-ʻAtik), and Coliath. Smar Jbeil Castle was part of this network, with these fortresses serving to control the region and facilitate defensive operations, while alliances between Crusaders and local rulers shaped control of surrounding territories.

=== Construction and attribution ===
The castle of Smar Jbeil was built in three phases by the Franks during the twelfth century. The initial construction, dating to the first quarter of the twelfth century, involved the excavation of the ditch and the construction of the main castle structure and donjon, built with large embossed ashlar blocks similar to those used in the castle of Jbeil. The castle's internal architectural elements date to the second phase, at the beginning of the second half of the twelfth century, and the addition of the barbican occurred in the third phase, at the beginning of the latter half of the same century. According to the Polish Center of Mediterranean Archaeology report, the castle originally belonged to a knight rewarded with the surrounding land as a fief, likely in recognition of service to the County of Tripoli's ruler. Deschamps suggests that the castle may be attributed to Geoffroy d'Agoult.

=== Historical and scholarly mentions ===
The French orientalist Ernest Renan described Smar Jbeil as a notable Maronite village with a significant medieval history and castle in his 1864 Mission de Phénicie. He believed the castle's foundational work was ancient, possibly of Giblite (Byblian) or "Saturnian" origin, and highlighted ancient hypogea and relief sculptures on the castle's rock base which were too eroded to identify with certainty, though he conceded that these ancient substructures were "devoid of stylistic characteristics implying a date". Writing in Arabic in the early twentieth century, the Belgian historian Henri Lammens observed that while the visible portions of the castle date to the Middle Ages, (Note: “ترتقي إلى الأجيال المتوسطة فقط”) its lower foundations, the bases of its towers, and its rock-cut ditches indicate greater antiquity. He suggested, without presenting supporting evidence, that the Phoenicians may have executed these works, noting also the exceptional workmanship of the cisterns hewn deeply into solid rock. The French archaeologist René Dussaud briefly listed the castle in his 1927 work Topographie historique de la Syrie antique et médiévale. In 1953, the French archaeologist Paul Deschamps and architect Jean Lauffray visited the castle and produced a brief description and rough sketch of its layout. The site was listed among Stone Age localities in archaeological inventories of Lebanon published in the 1960s.

=== Scholarly debate and misidentification ===
Local accounts frequently attribute the castle of Smar Jbeil to the Phoenicians, a claim that appears widely in tourism literature. Archaeological and architectural evidence, however, shows that the standing castle structure dates to the medieval period. Earlier finds on the site, such as carved limestone presses, rock-cut cisterns, a fifth-century BC tetradrachm, and ancient funerary bas-reliefs, indicate that the hill was occupied and reused since antiquity, before the Crusader fortifications were built atop these earlier layers. This popular belief largely stems from the early orientalist accounts of Renan and Lammens, both of whom remarked on the apparent antiquity of the castle's substructures without identifying them as Phoenician through archaeological analysis. Renan also speculated that the castle might be Mardaite in origin, a claim subsequently refuted by Lammens. Architectural and archaeological analysis by Chaaya (2016) demonstrates that the standing castle is medieval, dating to the Crusader period, while the rock-cut elements described by earlier scholars belong to earlier phases of occupation stretching back to the Roman period and possibly earlier.

In the nineteenth century, German scholars including the orientalist Franz Karl Movers and the geographer Carl Ritter (Note: Carl Ritter assumed the identification of Smar Jbeil (Semar Gebail) with "Palaebyblos" primarily on the basis of the similarity in names, rather than on archaeological or textual evidence.) attributed to the eighteenth-century Maronite scholar Giuseppe Simone Assemani the identification of Smar Jbeil with Palaebyblus (Old Byblos), (Note: The identification of Smar Jbeil with Palaebyblos is not explicitly attested in Assemani's Bibliotheca Orientalis. Nineteenth-century scholars disagreed with this identification.) an ancient town in Phoenicia mentioned by ancient geographers. Renan found this identification incorrect, arguing that it rested on onomastic name-based association alone, and presented ancient geographical sources situating Palaebyblos south of Byblos, beyond the Adonis River. Renan also speculated that Smar Jbeil may have been among the fortified Iturean mountain settlements described by Strabo as refuges for brigands, later destroyed by the Roman general Pompey.

==== Local lore ====
Local tradition associates the town of Smar Jbeil with a significant mountain refuge in Maronite history. Historical accounts suggest that Saint John Maron, regarded as the first Maronite patriarch, may have resided in the town during the late seventh century AD. The Maronite patriarch and historian Istifan al-Duwayhi recounts that after the Sasanian incursion into Syria in 609 AD, the Patriarchal See of Antioch remained vacant until 685. When the clergy of Antioch convened to elect a new patriarch, they chose John Maron, who had served as Bishop of Batroun since 676. The Byzantine Empire did not recognize this election, and the emperor ordered John Maron's arrest. In response, according to al-Duwayhi, the patriarch fled to the Monastery of Saint Maron on the Orontes River, prompting the emperor to dispatch a military expedition to capture him. Al-Duwayhi further recounts that John Maron sought the help of his nephew Ibrahim, who was governor of Mount Lebanon, and that Ibrahim sent twelve thousand soldiers who accompanied John Maron to Smar Jbeil. Local tradition variously holds that the castle was connected by underground tunnels to the coast, or to neighboring valleys, a claim absent from the archaeological literature on the site.

=== Later history ===
The County of Tripoli fell to the Mamluk Sultanate in 1289; two years later the Mamluk sultan al-Malik al-Ashraf completed his conquest of the Lebanese coast, capturing Tyre, Sidon, Sarafand, Beirut, Byblos, Batroun, and Anfeh. The Mamluks destroyed the fortresses and fortifications of the coastal settlements they seized, causing most to be abandoned. Mamluk control of Lebanon persisted for more than two centuries, ending when the Ottomans overturned it in 1516.

In the early seventeenth century, during the conflict between the Ottoman-era Druze Emir Fakhr al-Din II and the Sayfa clan, the castle of Smar Jbeil changed hands. While besieging Yusuf Sayfa at Krak des Chevaliers in February 1619, Fakhr al-Din secured the defection of several of the Sayfas' men, including those holding the castles of Byblos and Smar Jbeil. This marked the castle's passage into Fakhr al-Din's control during his expansion into the Maronite-populated districts of northern Mount Lebanon. The feudal Khazin family thereafter established their residence in the castle. According to al-Duwayhi, an earthquake in 1630 caused significant damage to the castle's donjon tower and a lower vault. Among the victims were Nawfal, the son of Sheikh Nādir al-Khāzin, his mother, and six other individuals. The castle was restored by Nādir al-Khāzin in 1631. Archival material from the Maronite Church indicates that, in the nineteenth century, the castle functioned as the seat of the Maronite bishopric. The donjon tower remained the property of the Maronite Church until its expropriation by the Lebanese Directorate General of Antiquities in 1997.

The castle underwent a first restoration and rehabilitation phase between 1963 and 1964. Before the Lebanese Civil War, the castle of Smar Jbeil was a well-known tourist destination, with visitor numbers reported to have rivaled those of major Lebanese archaeological sites such as Tyre. During the war, the site was occupied for an extended period by de facto militia forces, who used it as a military post, causing damage to the structure. Following the establishment of the Smar Jbeil Castle Festivals Association in 2006, an annual summer festival has been held at the site since 2008, combining concerts by Lebanese performers with presentations on the castle's history, and directing its proceeds toward ongoing restoration work. Further rehabilitation and restoration works were carried out in 2011 and 2017. A survey project on the castle was carried out by the Polish Centre of Mediterranean Archaeology (University of Warsaw), in cooperation with the Lebanese Directorate General of Antiquities, under the direction of Karol Juchniewicz in 2014–2015. The mission focused on documenting the architecture of the castle and its surroundings, as well as that of the adjoining village. The Castle of Smar Jbeil is open to the public with no admission fees. It is maintained by the Lebanese Directorate General of Antiquities as an un-ticketed heritage site, and it is excluded from the official ticketing lists published by the Lebanese Ministry of Tourism.

== Architecture and description ==
The plan of the castle of Smar Jbeil produced by Lauffray, which did not record the entrances, arrowslits, or cisterns.

Deschamps observed that the castle of Smar Jbeil follows a plan closely resembling that of the castle of Gibelet. It features a tall rectangular donjon dominating the other defensive works, set at the centre of a courtyard enclosed by irregularly planned curtain walls with four corner towers. He identified this as the simplest form of Romanesque castles, a type also attested at Qal'at Yahmur west of the Krak des Chevaliers, and in Palestine in three castles built by King Fulk of Anjou (fl. 1131 – c. 1143): Bethgibelin, Ibelin, and Blanche-Garde.

The British archaeologist and medievalist Denys Pringle described the castle of Smar Jbeil as a small tower-and-bailey fortification. It has an uneven parallelogram shape, extending approximately 67 m (220 ft) along the northwest–southeast orientation and 63.5 m (208 ft) along the northeast–southwest orientation. Built of white limestone ashlar blocks, with some parts, including the donjon tower featuring large, rusticated ashlar blocks, the castle occupies a rocky prominence. Its eastern side is secured by a 55-meter (180-foot) long and 15.5-meter (51-foot) wide ditch cut directly into the bedrock, supplementing the natural barriers afforded by the surrounding terrain to the north, west, and south. The castle was built on the remains of a Roman-period site.

=== The barbican ===
The ramparts of the castle are defended on the northwest and southwest sides by a barbican which secures the main entrance. The barbican is composed of two curtain walls built with smaller ashlar blocks, linked by a single, two-storey projecting corner tower identified as M on Lauffray's plan. The two curtain walls have an average thickness of 1.35 m (4.4 ft) and are preserved to an average height of 1.4 m (4.6 ft); they adjoin the castle's main fortifications at the centre of the northwestern rampart curtain wall and at the southern corner tower. Remnants of up to six arrowslits and a drainage channel are still visible in the barbican's southwestern curtain wall, while the northwestern wall was protected by eleven arrowslits. Access to the barbican is provided by a primary entrance on the southwest curtain wall and a postern positioned at the eastern end of the southwestern curtain wall. This gate measures 3.45 m (11.3 ft) wide and functioned as a controlled entryway between two gates, with another doorway positioned at the northeastern side guarded by the barbican's tower. The 0.7 m (2.3 ft) wide postern is carved in the bedrock and leads to a rock-cut staircase.

=== The defensive towers ===
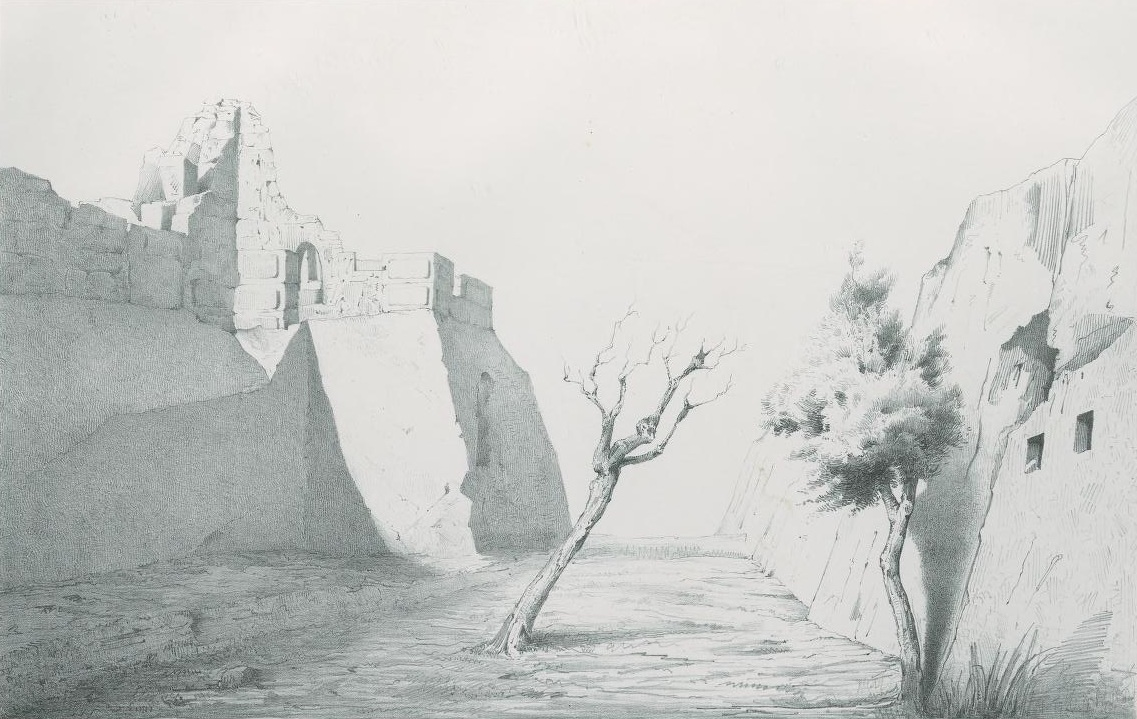
The rock-carved ditch, from Renan's Mission de Phénicie

The castle has four primary towers situated at each of its corners: the Western, Northern, Eastern, and Southern Corner Towers, and two additional towers located midway along the southeastern and southwestern sides. The tower at the midpoint of the southwestern side houses the castle's main gate on its ground floor and is referred to as the Gate Tower.

Located to the west of the main gate tower's entrance, the west corner tower is accessible via a 1 m (3.3 ft) wide single door opening to the inner courtyard. This square tower originally consisted of at least two floors, though only the ground floor remains intact, and contains four arrowslits on each of its sides. The south corner tower, located east of the main gate tower, comprises three levels. Entry to the ground floor is through the northeastern wall, while access to the upper floors was via adjoining buildings. The preserved remains of the first floor include two walls, each fitted with an arrowslit, and the second floor, partially preserved, was originally covered by a barrel-vaulted ceiling. The northwestern wall of the ground floor contains remnants of a closed-off postern that appears to belong to an earlier construction phase. (Note: Haroutune Kalayan, a former engineer at the Lebanese Directorate General of Antiquities, restored parts of the south corner tower in the early 1970s using stones sourced from multiple archaeological sites near Smar Jbeil. This restoration incorporated discrepant masonry techniques into the tower's eastern façade that are still visible today.)

The northeastern front comprises the north corner tower and the east corner tower, together with a building whose exterior wall forms this front's curtain wall, and a projecting northeast wall tower. The smaller east corner tower contains a ground floor with a well-constructed cross vault and two arrowslits oriented toward the northeastern and southeastern sides. The protruding northeast wall tower, located centrally along the eastern front, contained three arrowslits, one facing east and two covering the east-facing curtain walls. At the northwest corner of the castle stands the north corner tower, situated atop a rocky cliff that provides natural defences to the north and west. This structure originally had two storeys, of which only the first is preserved up to the ceiling, which appears to have been constructed as a cross vault. The tower contains three arrowslits.

A central Donjon Tower is positioned within the castle's inner yard on a 4 m (13 ft) high podium carved in the bedrock. The rectangular tower measures approximately 16 m (52 ft) along the northeast–southwest axis and 14.3 m (47 ft) along the northwest–southeast axis, with walls approximately 3 m (9.8 ft) thick. Its entrance was elevated and accessible via a wooden ladder. The donjon tower consists of at least two storeys, of which only the ground-floor walls are preserved. It served both as the lord's residence and as the final point of defence, and constitutes a distinctive architectural element characteristic of Crusader-period castles.

=== Gates and internal structures ===
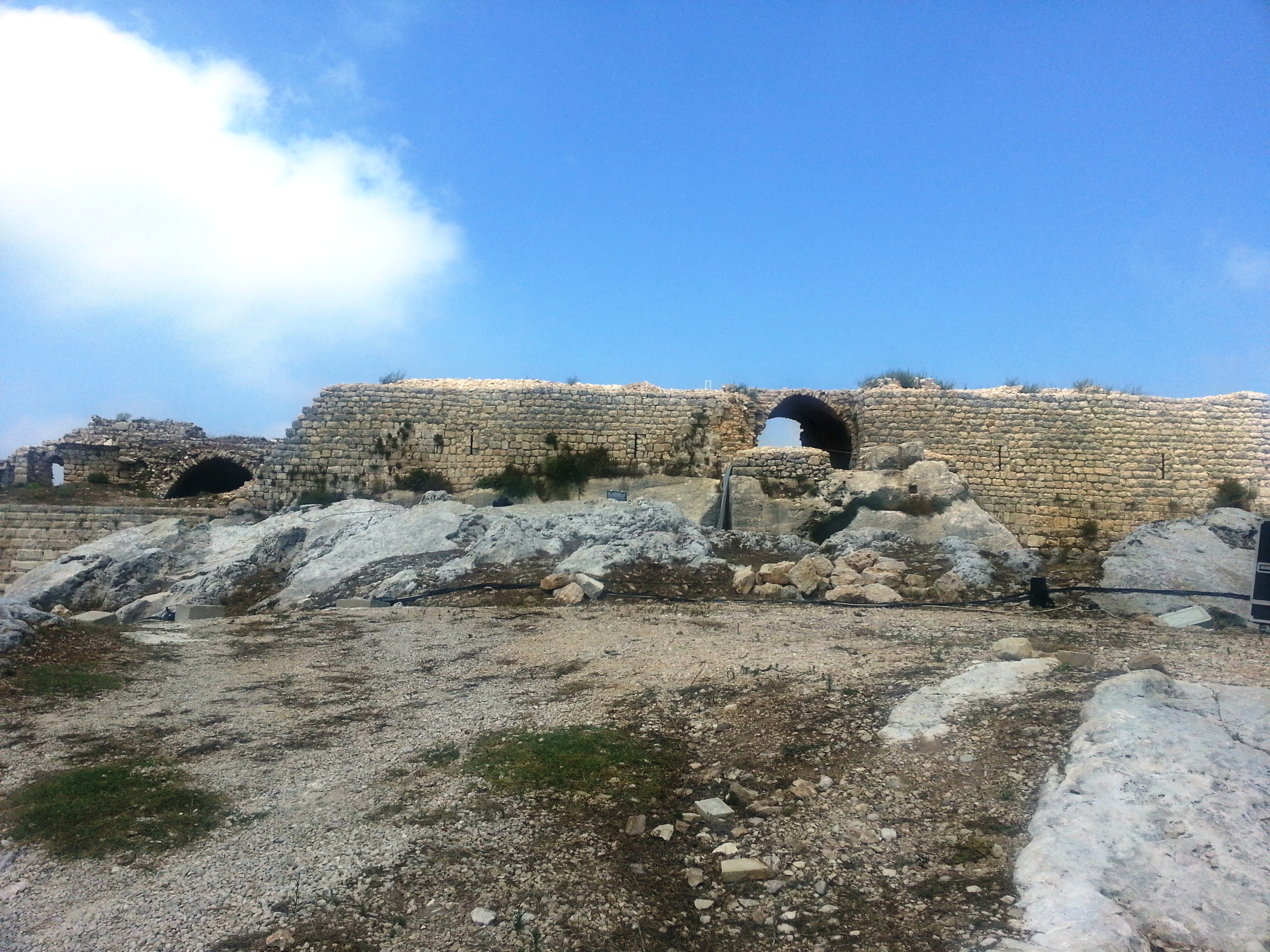
The castle of Smar Jbeil viewed from the west

The castle's main gate consists of a passage with double doors at each end, flanked by two stone benches set against its side walls. The gate's threshold lies 1 m (3.3 ft) above the outer court level, implying the former presence of a removable wooden access ramp or stairs. This passage was roofed by a barrel vault that has since collapsed along with the upper floor it supported. The main gate gives access to the inner courtyard, with an open area to the north and a stable to the left, with the donjon standing in the centre between them.

The main gate tower is flanked by two adjacent buildings separating it from the west and south corner towers. The windowless building to the east of the main gate is identified by Chaaya as the castle's chapel, based on its orientation, the high quality of its vault finish, its considerable size, and its proximity to the entrance. It comprised two floors, of which only part of the ground floor survives, consisting of a rectangular chamber subdivided into three east–west aligned spans. The entrance to this chapel is 1.5 m (4.9 ft) wide but does not survive to its original height. To the west of the main gate tower lies another two-floor building, of which only the ground floor remains. The ground floor comprises two rooms with no interconnecting doorway, both opening onto the inner court via doors in their northern walls. The eastern room is rectangular, oriented northwest–southeast, and its southern wall contains two arrowslits defending the exterior space. The western room is smaller and windowless.

The southeastern front contains a two-storey structure of which only the ground floor remains intact. The ground floor comprises a series of rooms covered by cross vaults, each equipped with an average of seven arrowslits overseeing the ditch. The interior of Curtain Wall C4 forms a long gallery that Chaaya identifies as the castle's great hall, on the basis of a well-crafted entrance door 1.22 m (4.0 ft) wide in its northeastern wall, a large chimney located approximately 5 m (16 ft) to the south, and a staircase leading to the second floor built along the gallery's northwestern façade.

The northwestern Curtain Wall C1, lying between the west corner tower and the north corner tower, contains three chambers with arrowslits, the northernmost also serving as a latrine. Postern Pt2, measuring 1.55 m (5.1 ft) in width and elevated to overlook the ravine north of the promontory, would have permitted a messenger to exit the castle discreetly during a siege. This postern was defended by the north corner tower and the east corner tower. According to Chaaya, the donjon tower, the north corner tower, and the intermediate space between them together formed the seigniorial residence of the castle, occupying most of the northern and central part of the enclosure.

=== Water supply system ===
The castle contains several water-related installations carved into the bedrock or integrated into its towers and internal structures. A total of ten rainwater cisterns are distributed across the towers, the donjon platform, and the main entrance area, designed to ensure a reliable water supply, particularly during siege. According to Chaaya, the placement of these cisterns suggests that most predated the construction of the castle and the development of its circulation system.

Five cisterns are integrated into towers: one is carved into the rocky foundation of the west corner tower; one is located in the basement of the north corner tower; one is carved into the bedrock beside the entrance of the Donjon Tower; and two are carved directly into the bedrock of the projecting tower on the southeastern wall. An additional four cisterns are cut into the rocky platform surrounding the donjon, with one located to the northwest, two to the southeast, and one to the west of the tower, all at closely similar elevations. The concentration of cisterns around the donjon and their closely aligned elevations suggest, according to Chaaya, that several of these installations predate the Crusader castle and were likely inherited from earlier, possibly Roman-period, occupation of the site. Another cistern is carved into the rock inside a building situated southeast of the main castle entrance.

Within the main gate passage, the floor covers a channel that drains rainwater from the inner court to the outer court. Inside the stable, located left of the main gate, water troughs were hewn into the bedrock, likely used by the knights' horses or livestock.

=== Earlier structures and archaeological finds ===
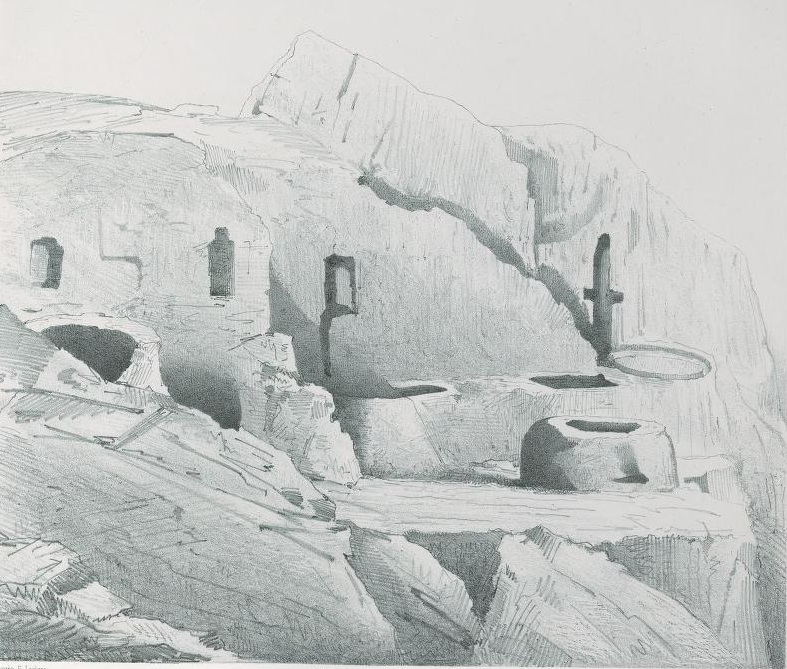
Rock-cut works at Smar Jbeil, from Renan's Mission de Phénicie

Debris clearance at the site have revealed artifacts and structures from multiple historical periods, indicating the presence of human activity prior to the construction of the castle. Bronze Age pottery was recovered within a backfill during rehabilitation work conducted between 2012 and 2013. Further evidence of pre-medieval occupation includes remnants of a sanctuary and funerary complex situated within the castle area. A votive altar was uncovered in a gallery on the southeastern front. Additional remains are preserved along the northern cliff and the eastern section of the ditch, where traces of a Roman-era necropolis have been documented. On the northeastern front, a hypogeum of a type typical of the late Roman period was identified, and scattered along the cliff are diverse tomb types carved directly into the bedrock or located within small caves, extending toward the eastern portion of the ditch.

In the central portion of the northeastern cliff, two panels of heavily eroded bas-reliefs depict seven human figures. The eastern panel, rectangular in form, contains five standing figures, each within a separate frame. The smaller western panel includes two figures, one of them seated and potentially representing a woman. Renan compared the imagery with reliefs at Ghineh and Mashnaqa.

On a smoothed rock later reused as the wall of a stable, Ernest Renan documented a large dovetail-shaped cartouche bearing a heavily weathered Greek funerary inscription. According to his reading, it commemorated a mother buried in the tomb of her son and noted that she had lived to the age of 110 years. The inscription included a date given in the Seleucid era, year 553, which corresponds to 241 BC.

Remnants of half a threshold and a column sculpted in high relief in the rock are preserved at the donjon's western corner, indicating earlier occupation prior to the construction of the donjon. The sculpted column was possibly part of a hypogeum located northwest of the donjon; Chaaya suggests that quarrying destroyed part of that earlier hypogeum and helped produce the rock platform later used for the donjon.

Among the coins found at the site, Ernest Renan examined an Athenian tetradrachm, which he attributed to the period of Pericles (fl. 461 – c. 429 BC), discovered near the sculpted panels at the base of the castle. Additional finds included Crusader coins, particularly those of the Counts of Tripoli.

== Function ==
According to Chaaya, the castle functioned as the seat of a small group of feudal seigniors within the barony of Boutron and served as a fortified stronghold strategically built on a mountain outcrop to provide extensive views of the Mediterranean, the Mount Lebanon range, and the surrounding regions of Batroun and Jbeil, including the village of Maad across the Madfoun Valley. Designed according to advanced defensive and poliorcetic principles, the castle's layout incorporated a succession of defensive lines composed of a barbican, curtain walls, defensive towers, and a donjon overseeing all fronts.

In the immediate surroundings of the castle, several rock-cut installations have been identified that are presumed to have functioned primarily as olive or wine presses, though their exact purpose remains uncertain. Archaeological and historical evidence suggests that the castle's storerooms were used for the storage of agricultural produce and various goods collected from nearby rural settlements.

Below the castle sits the village of Smar Jbeil, which appears to have had no fortifications. Three churches from the Crusader era are known within the village. The most prominent, dedicated to Mar Nohra (a saint widely venerated in Lebanon), serves the Maronite community and is thought to date to the 13th century based on its construction style. A smaller nearby chapel honors the Virgin Mary; some local traditions place its origins as far back as the sixth century, though modern scholarship considers the structure to be of medieval origin. The Polish mission interpreted the castle and adjoining village as parts of the same medieval economic and settlement system.

== Gallery ==
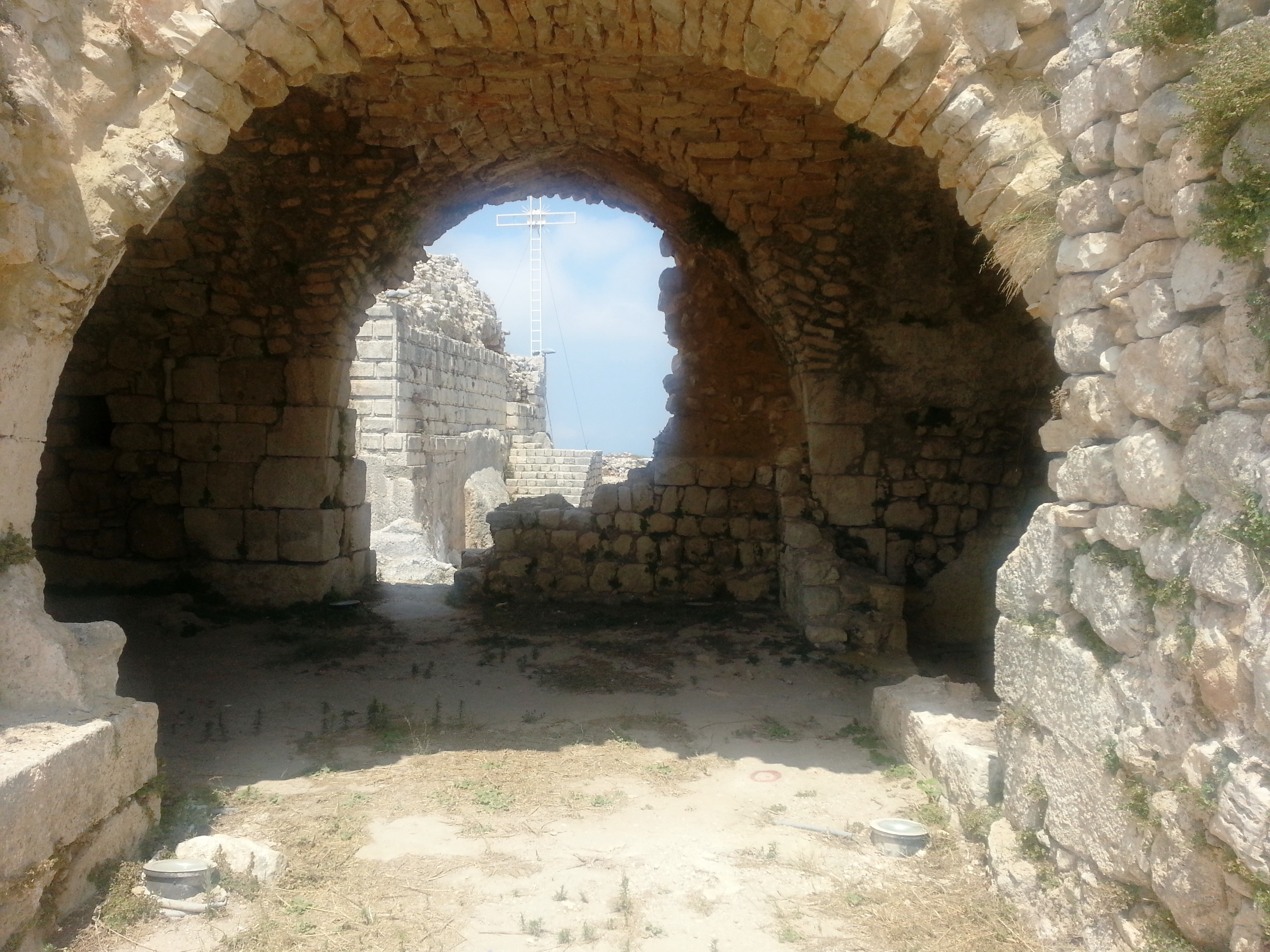
Primary entrance on the southwest curtain, in the background the Donjon Tower.

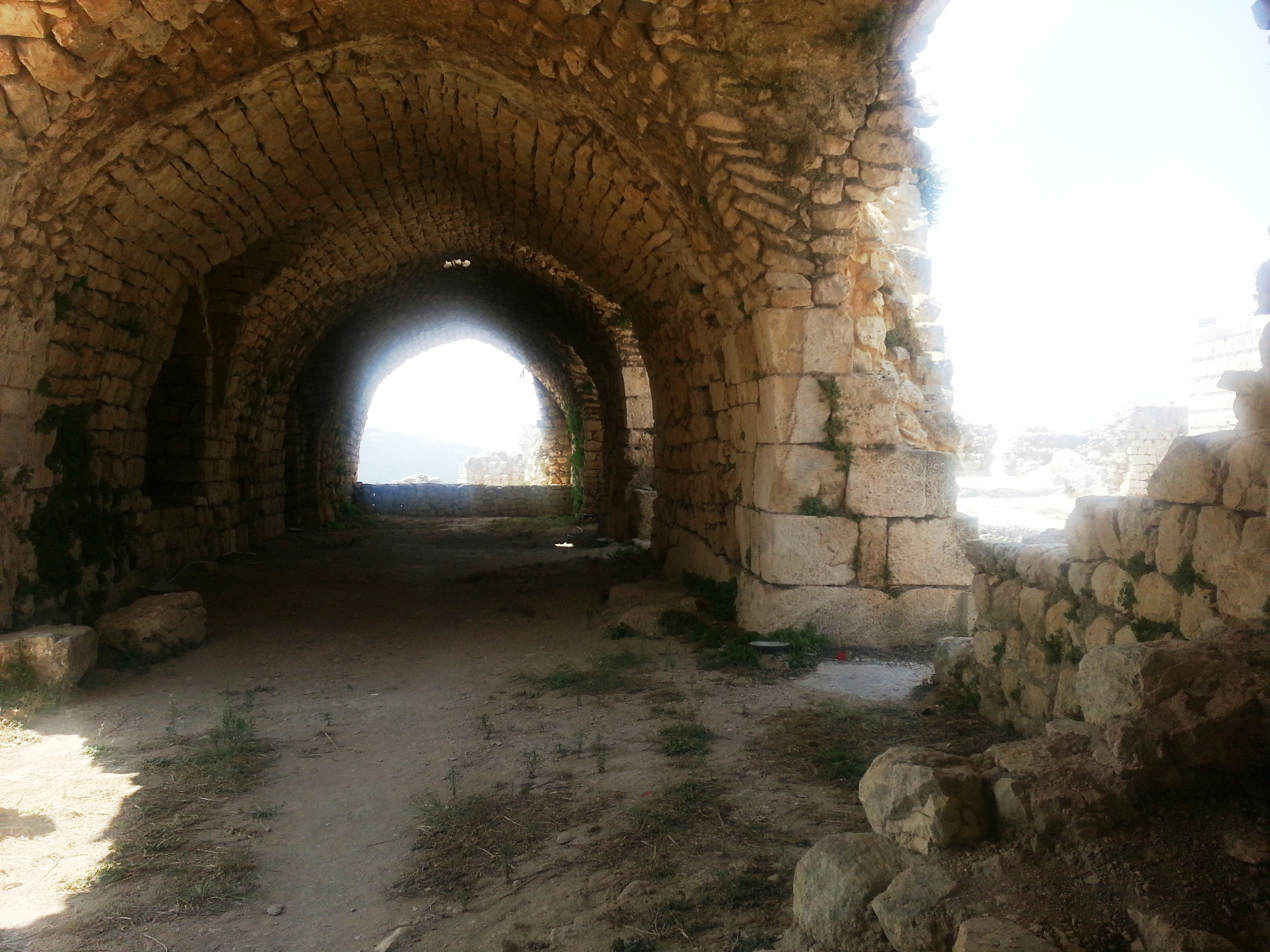
The great hall in 2013

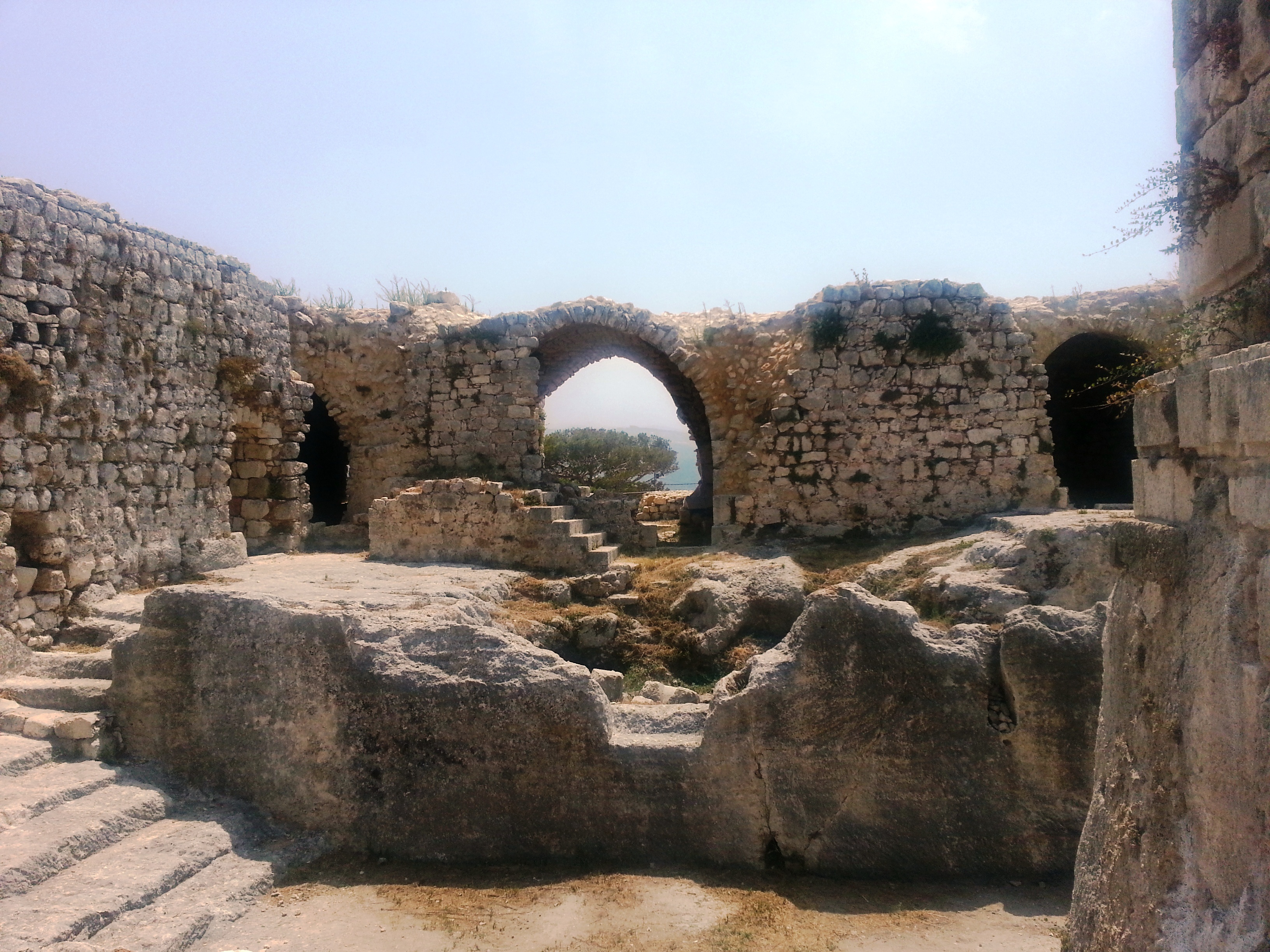
The courtyard cistern with the main entrance beyond

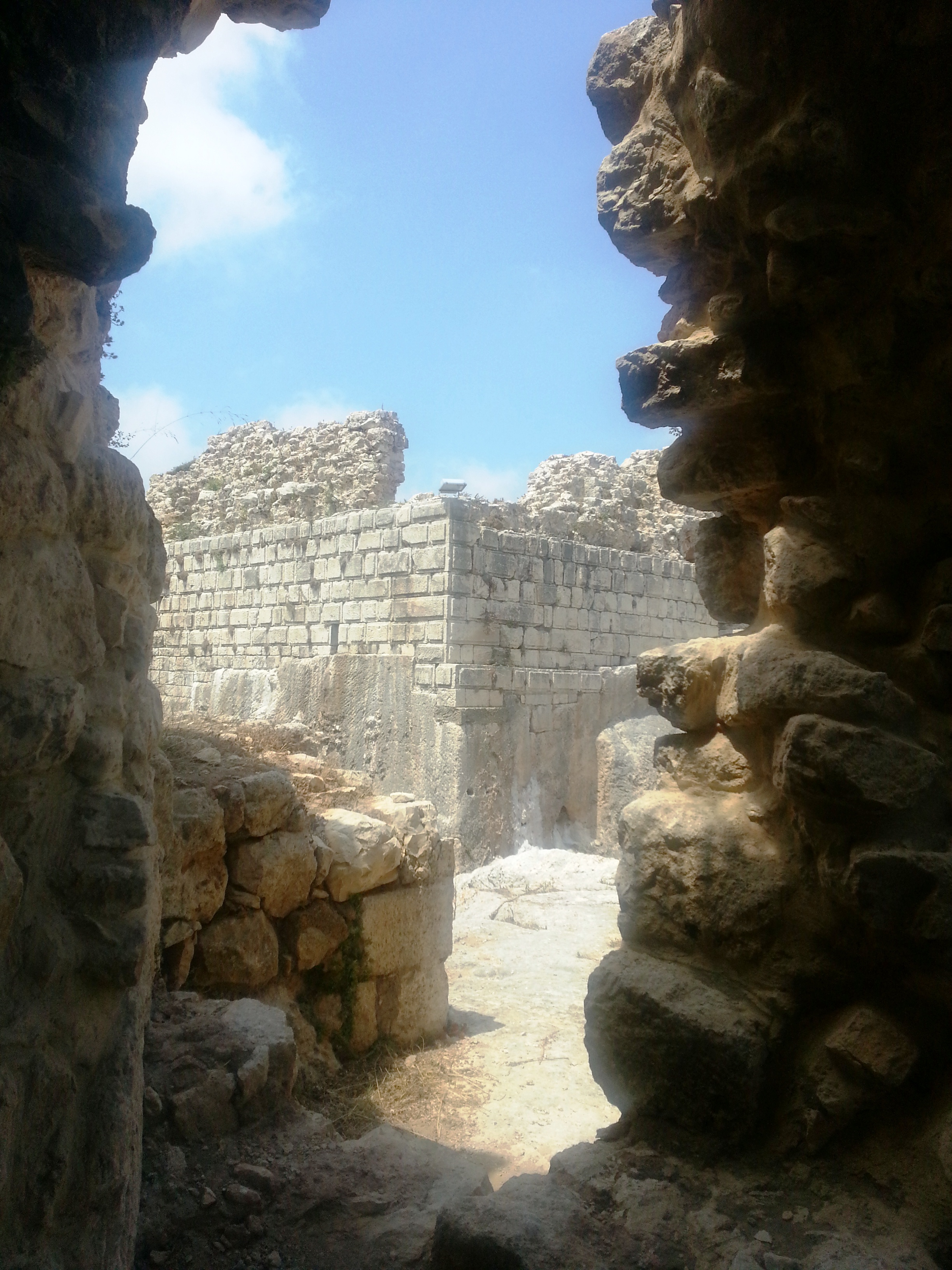
The Donjon Tower

== See also ==
- Byblos Castle – Castle in Byblos, Lebanon
- Krak des Chevaliers – Crusader castle near Homs, Syria
- County of Tripoli – Crusader state in the Levant from 1102 to 1289
- List of motte-and-bailey castles
