= Castleruddery Motte =

12th-century Norman castle in Ireland

- Móta Chaisleán an Ridire (Irish)
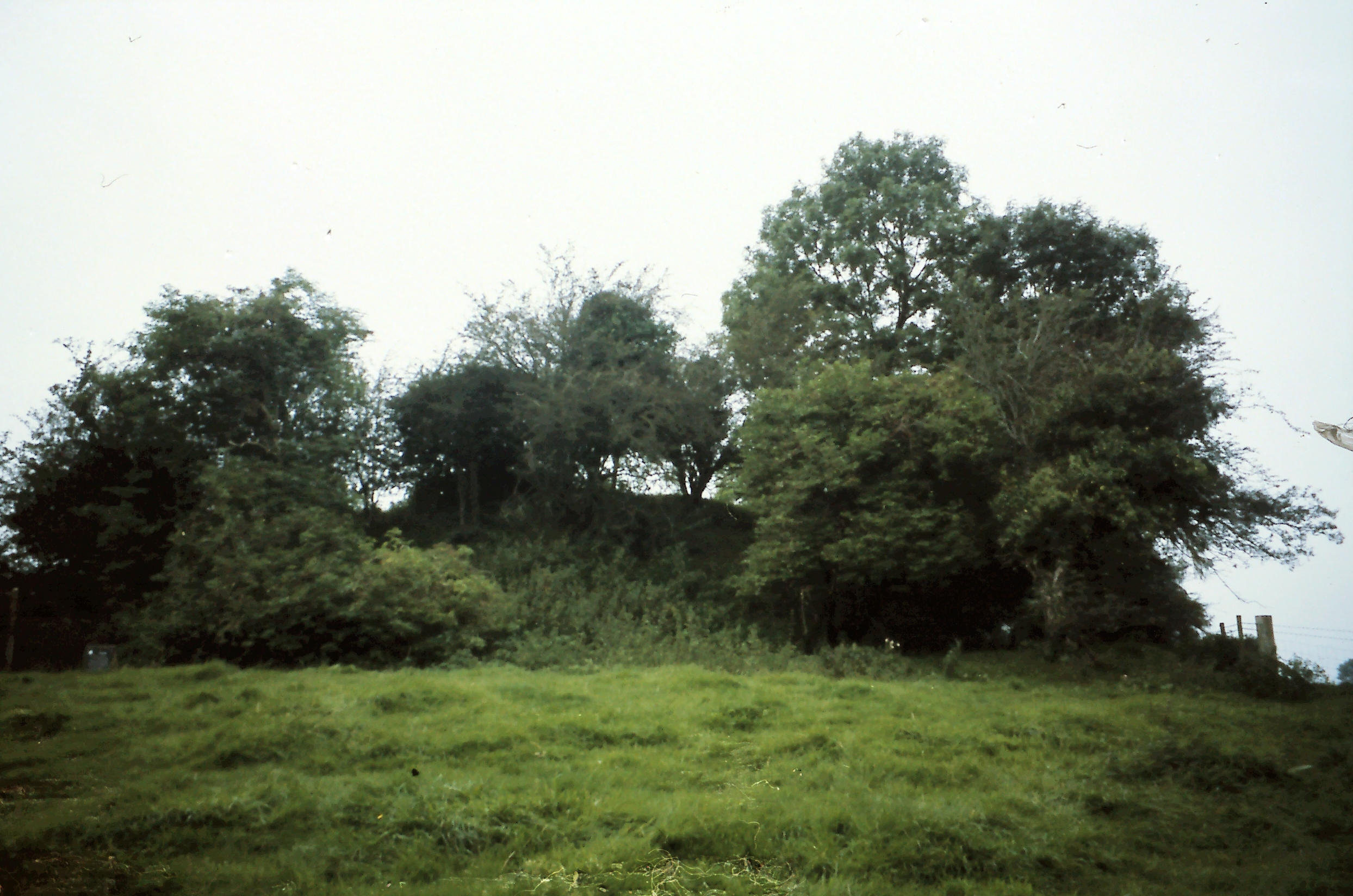

- Location within Ireland
- 52.992817°N 6.644379°W
- Type: motte
- Cultures: Hiberno-Norman
- Location: Castleruddery Lower, Donard, County Wicklow, Ireland
- Region: Slaney Valley

History
- Built: late 12th century

Site notes
- Material: earth
- Elevation: 163 m (535 ft)
- Area: 0.23 ha (0.57 acres)
- Diameter: 54 m (177 ft)
- Owner: private

National monument of Ireland
- Official name: Castleruddery
- Reference no.: 442

Castleruddery Motte is a motte and National Monument located in County Wicklow, Ireland.

== Location ==
Castleruddery Motte is located 2 km (1.2 mi) east-northeast of Stratford-on-Slaney, on a slope 400 m (¼ mile) north of the River Slaney.

== History ==
The motte was built in the late 12th century after the Norman invasion of Ireland. The motte at Castleruddery is located close to an early church mentioned in the twelfth century which formed part of the diocesan lands of Glendalough. In the early 13th century it became part of an episcopal manor and was subsequently granted to the Dean of St. Patrick's Cathedral, Dublin. A borough grew up in association with the manor, of which the motte formed a part.

== Description ==
Castleruddery Motte is round, with an internal diameter of 30 m (98 ft) and is enclosed by an earthen bank. The motte guards a river crossing.
