= Dún Dealgan Motte =

Motte and National Monument

- Móta Dhún Dealgan (Irish)
- Cú Chulainn's Castle; Castletown Motte; Castletown Mount; Byrne's Folly
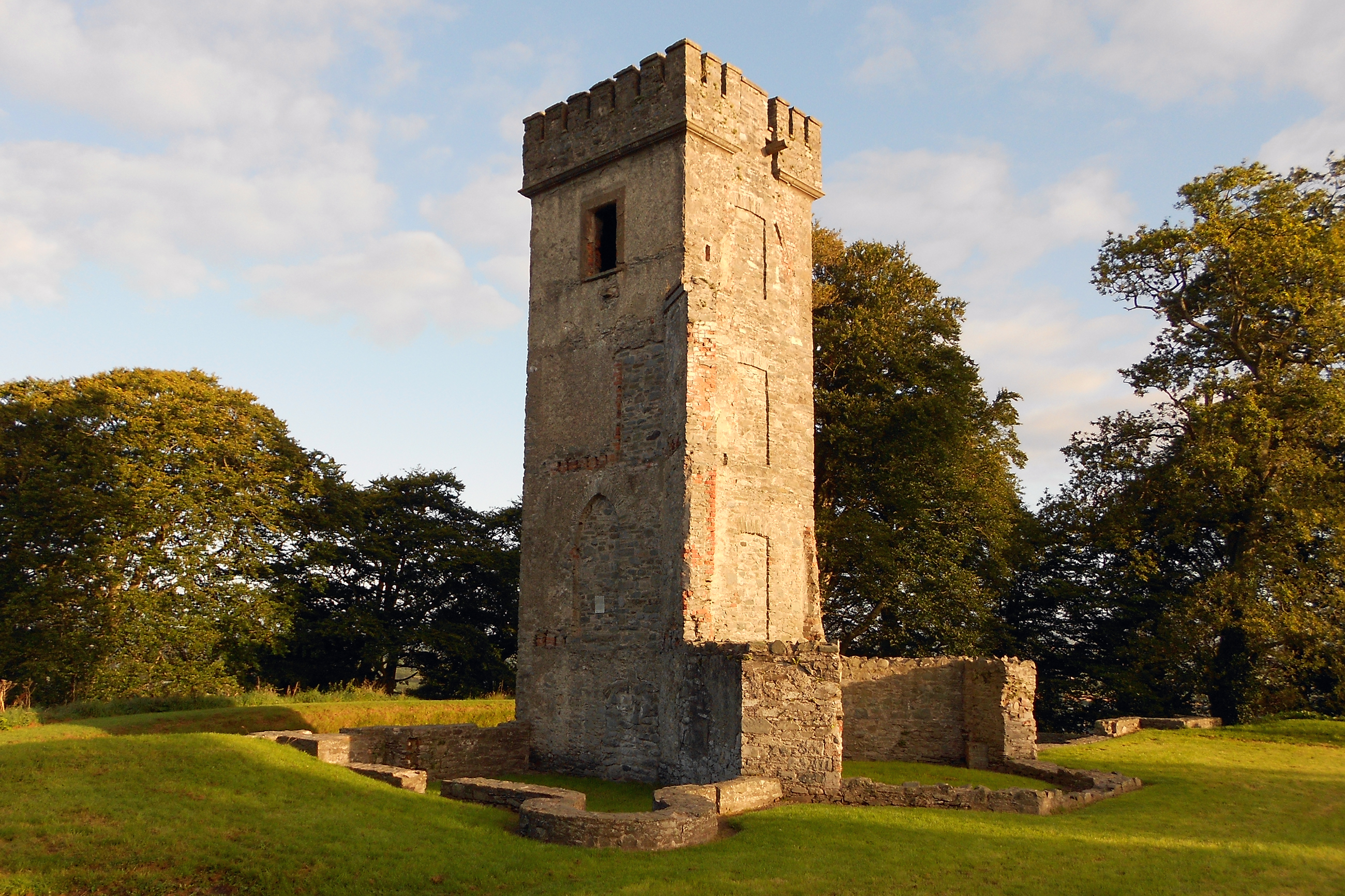
- Byrne's Folly atop Dún Dealgan Motte

- Location within Ireland
- 54.013889°N 6.430278°W
- Type: motte with castellated house
- Periods: Norman Ireland
- Cultures: Cambro-Norman, Old English
- Associated with: Normans
- Location: Castletown, Dundalk, County Louth, Ireland
- Region: Castletown River Valley

History
- Built: late 12th century
- Built by: Bertram III de Verdun

Site notes
- Material: earth
- Height: 10 metres (33 ft)
- Area: 0.85 ha (2.1 acres)
- Diameter: 43 metres (141 ft) (at summit)
- Circumference: 135 metres (443 ft) (at summit)
- Public access: yes

National monument of Ireland
- Official name: Dun Dealgan
- Reference no.: 388

Dún Dealgan Motte is a motte and National Monument in Dundalk, Ireland.

== Location ==
Dún Dealgan Motte is located immediately northwest of Dundalk and west of Mount Avenue, on a ridge overlooking the Castletown River.

== History and archaeology ==
=== Motte ===
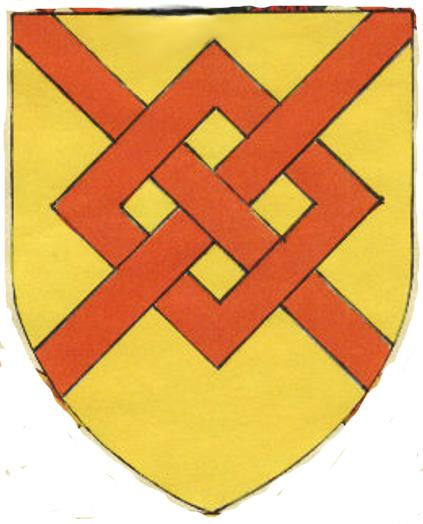
Arms of Bertram III de Verdun

An ancient Gaelic Irish dún once stood here. Some legends claim the site as the birthplace of Cú Chulainn, and it is here that he bases himself in the Táin Bó Cúailgne. The Annals of the Four Masters places a battle here in 500 AD.

Early accounts merely call it Dealga, with dún only added after 1002, so it's possible that a fort was only built on the hill around that time. A Z-shaped souterrain, 17 m (56 ft) in length, was also dug into the hill in the Gaelic period.

Motte-and-bailey castles were a primitive type of castle built after the Norman invasion, a mound of earth topped by a wooden palisade and tower. The motte and bailey castle was built on a mound of earth c. 68m in diameter at the base and 10m in height, allowing the tower on top to have a commanding view for miles, including a clear line of sight to the Castletown River and towards the northern route from Ulster. Dún Dealgan motte is believed to have been constructed by Bertram III de Verdun (c.1135–1192), with a bailey to the southeast. It was a stronghold of Hugh de Lacy, 1st Earl of Ulster, in 1210, but he left it when pursued northwards by King John of England.

=== Folly ===
A local landowner named Patrick Byrne (often called a pirate, due to much of his wealth originating from smuggling) began to build a Gothic house atop the mount in 1780. It was damaged in the 1798 Rebellion, and only a castellated tower ("Byrne's Folly") remained.

The house was rebuilt in 1850 by Thomas Vesey Dawson as a country retreat, but fell into disrepair and was bought by the County Louth Archaeological and Historical Society to be used for a museum. It was further damaged in the revolutionary period (1919–23) when it was deliberately set on fire by armed men.
