= Gortlownan Motte =

Motte in County Sligo, Ireland

- Móta Ghort Leamhnáin (Irish)
- Location within Ireland
- 54.221479°N 8.338829°W
- Type: motte
- Periods: Norman Ireland
- Cultures: Cambro-Norman, Old English
- Associated with: Normans
- Location: Gortlownan, Ballintogher, County Sligo, Ireland
- Region: Bonet Valley

History
- Built: late 12th century?

Site notes
- Material: earth
- Owner: State
- Public access: yes

National monument of Ireland
- Official name: Gortlownan
- Reference no.: 277

Gortlownan Motte is a motte and National Monument located in County Sligo, Ireland.

== Location ==
Gortlownan Motte is located 2.4 km (1½ miles) west-southwest of Dromahair, just on the Sligo side of the border.

== History and archaeology ==
Motte-and-bailey castles were a primitive type of castle built after the Norman invasion, a mound of earth topped by a wooden palisade and tower.

The motte at Gortlownan may have been built on the site of an earlier Gaelic Irish hillfort.
