= Smar Jbeil =

Village in North Governorate of Lebanon

Smar Jbeil سمار جبيل
- City
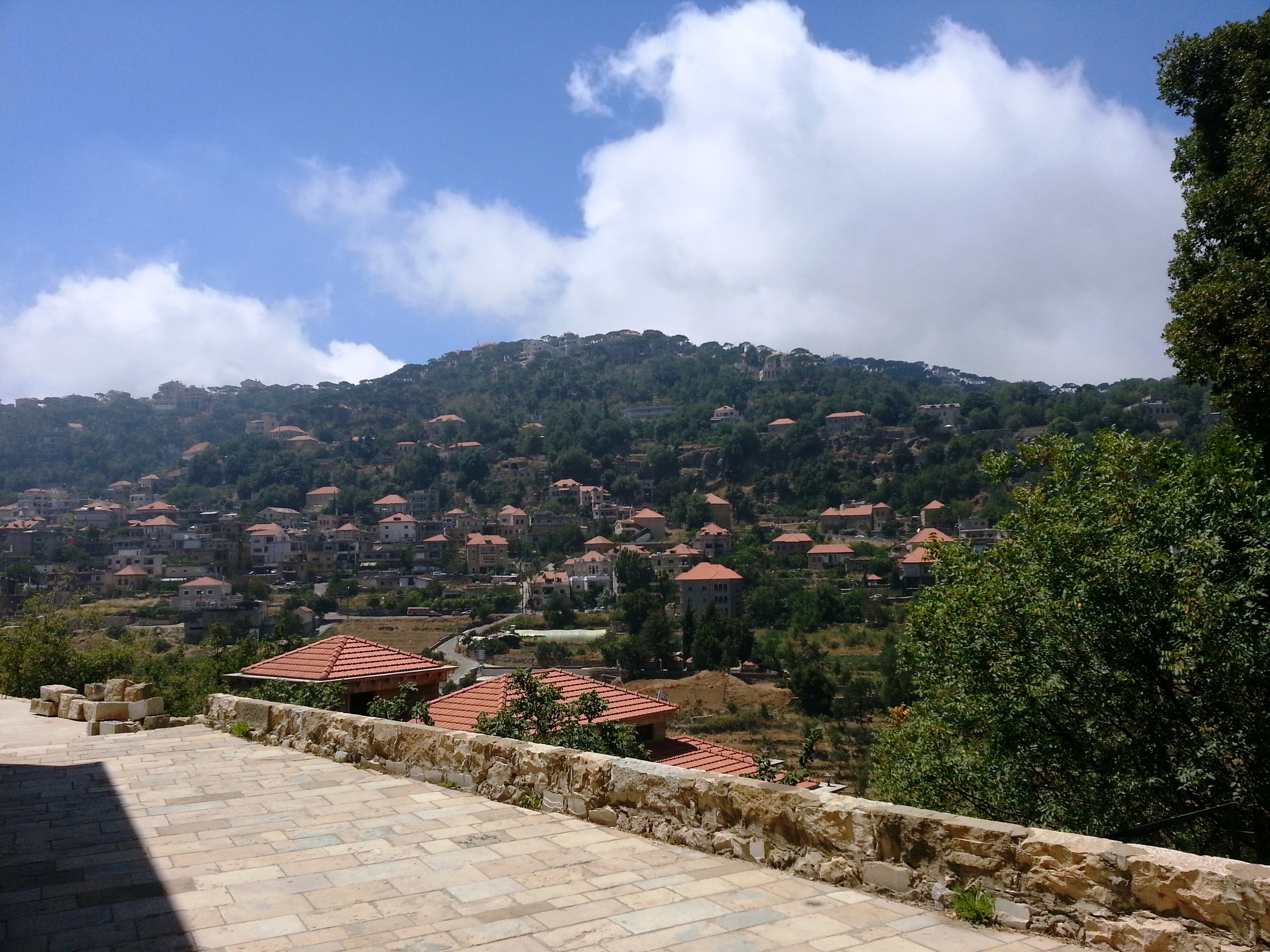
- The town viewed from the Castle of Smar Jbeil

- Location within Lebanon
- Coordinates: 34°13′0″N 35°41′0″E
- Country: Lebanon
- Governorate: North Governorate
- District: Batroun District
- Elevation: 480 m (1,570 ft)
- Time zone: UTC+2 (EET)
  - Summer (DST): UTC+3 (EEST)
- Dialing code: +961

Smar Jbeil (Arabic: سمار جبيل, romanized: Smār Jbeil), also known as Asmar Jbeil or Samar Jbeil, is a village located in the Batroun District in the North Governorate of Lebanon. It is located on a hill facing the Mediterranean Sea at 500 m elevation. It is one of the oldest villages in Lebanon.

== Etymology ==
Smar could be of Aramaic origin: Shemreho ܫܡܪܚܐ which means the "guardian" or the "protector"; Jbeil stands for Byblos, being the nearby coastal famous city. Given its strategic location on an open hillside, the village and its fort could have served as an advanced position for the defense of Jbeil from its northern side.

Others refer the name to the Phoenician roots: Sym meaning "tomb" and Mar meaning lord. In this case, the village could have served as a burial ground for the kings of Jbeil (which is the oldest Phoenician city located at 20 km at the southwest of Smar Jbeil).

== History ==
Smar Jbeil is one of the oldest villages in Lebanon according to Henri Lammens in his book Tasrīḥ al-abṣār fī mā yaḥtawī Lubnān min al-āthār. It has a very old castle at the western entrance of the village built on a strategic hill, showing from its western side, the Mediterranean coast from Byblos to Tripoli, and from its eastern side the mountains of Lebanon specially the famous Cedars of God mountain near Bsharri.

Many Maronites took refuge in Smar Jbeil after persecution in the Syrian hinterland at the hands of the Byzantine Empire. They took control of the castle where they installed their Patriarch. The first Patriarch Saint John Maron (685 CE) lived in Smar Jbeil castle before moving to Kfarhay. Byzantine border forces known as the Mardaites joined the Maronites later on and many merged with them even after the bulk of the Mardaites forces were withdrawn.

== Demographics ==
In 2014 Christians made up 98.77% of registered voters in Smar Jbeil. 91.18% of the voters were Maronite Catholics.

== Monuments ==
=== Castle ===
The castle of Smar Jbeil was built in the center of the village, on a hill showing the entire neighborhood. While it was originally built by the Phoenicians in 500 BC, its existing structure mostly dates to the period of the Crusades, when the area was part of the County of Tripoli.

The Castle had a main tower controlling the coast between Jbeil and Batrun. In his book Tarikh al-Azminah, the Patriarch Estephan El Douaihy (1670–1704) explains how the main castle tower was demolished:

Sunday, November 25th 1630, at 3:00AM a huge earthquake hit the castle and demolished the center tower from its four corners. It demolished also all what was in the lower basement.

The castle has many wells built in the rocks.

=== Churches ===
The old church of Saint Bassil and Nohra stands in the center of the village. It is constructed of mixed elements from a Roman temple and some later material, notably from medieval times. The church was renovated over the history first by the Crusades and after by the Maronites. The last renovation was done in the late 1800 where a rock chain was added to the main entrance. Saint Nohra is a priest form Manhour in Egypt who came to preach in Batroun in the early centuries of Christianity. When he reached the city, he was asked by its king to deny Jesus Christ; he refused immediately and kept preaching in Jesus Christ in the entire city. He was captured (by the king), killed and buried in one of the castle's wells. The well became since then, a shrine for all Christian believers. Saint Nohra is known as the intercessor of sight, he had a Sister named Takla (different from Saint Takla, follower of Saint Paul) and a brother named Qanoon. Close to Saint Nohra, an old little ruined chapel with a single nave could be seen, Our Lady of Gifts church. It is believed that this church is older than Saint Nohra's church. Less than 500 meters from Saint Bassil and Nohra church one cand find Saint Takla church, which is a smaller yet very old church venerated by the parish until our days. .

== Notable people ==
=== Patriarchs ===
Smar Jbeil is the homeland of three Maronite Patriarchs Michael Rizzi (1567–1581), Sarkis Rizzi (1581–1596) and Joseph Rizzi (1596–1608). They were born in Bkoufa and they were known as Al-Samrani's in relation to Smar Jbeil, their homeland and origins. Under Patriarch Michael Rizzi, the monastery of Saint Anthony the Great in Qozhaya (From Aramaic: the living Treasure) knew a revival, and later in 1610 the same monastery received the first printing press in the Middle East printing in Aramaic language.
