= Ballymoty Motte =

- Móta Bhaile an Mhóta (Irish)
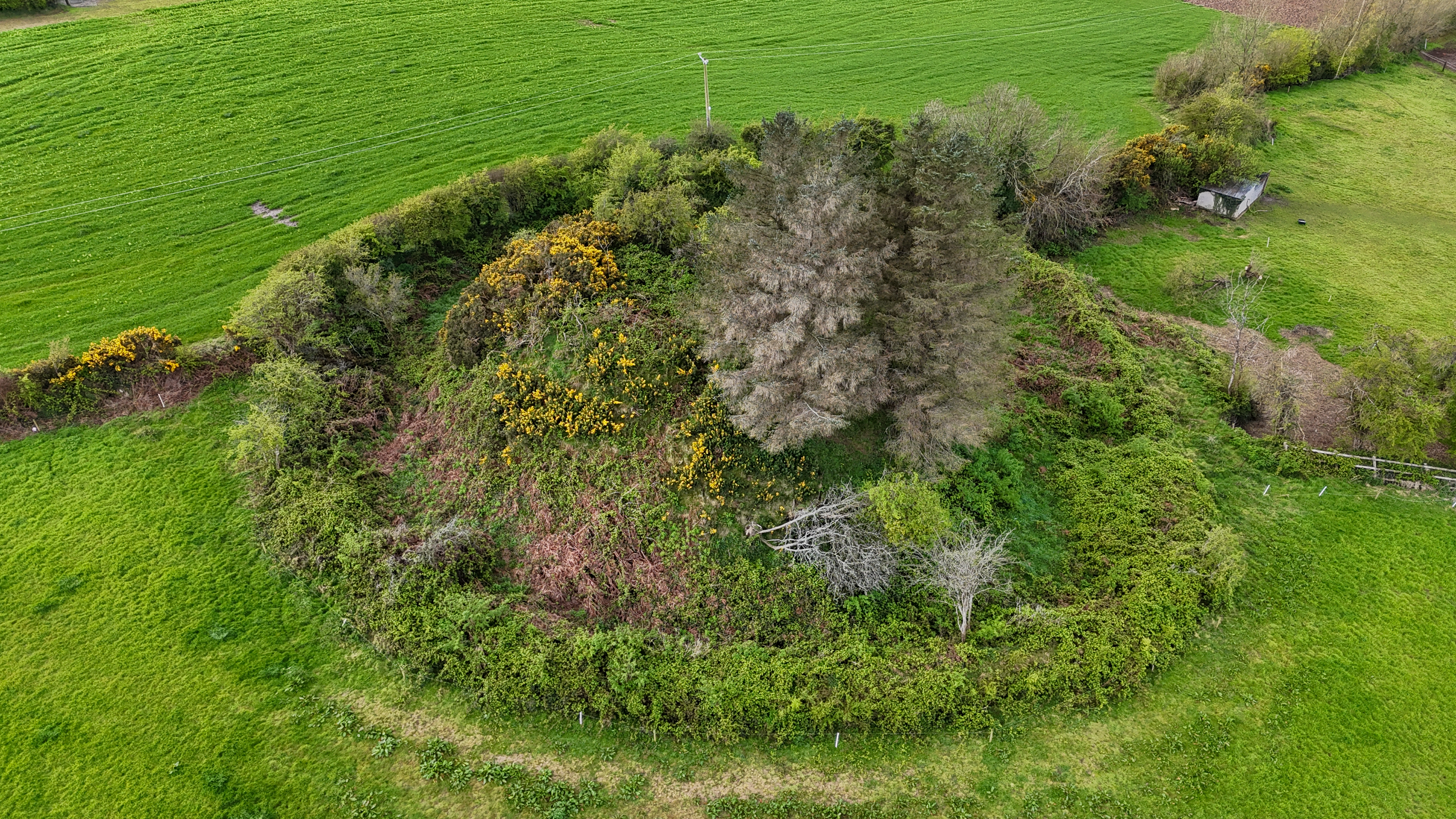
- Ballymoty Motte in 2026

- Location within Ireland
- 52°30′20″N 6°27′41″W
- Type: motte
- Cultures: Hiberno-Norman
- Location: Ballymoty More, Enniscorthy, County Wexford, Ireland
- Region: Slaney Valley

History
- Built: late 12th century

Site notes
- Material: earth
- Elevation: 89 m (292 ft)
- Area: 0.188 ha (0.46 acres)
- Diameter: 54 m (177 ft)
- Owner: private

National monument of Ireland
- Official name: Ballymoty
- Reference no.: 375

Ballymoty Motte is a motte and National Monument located in County Wexford, Ireland.

== Location ==
Ballymoty Motte is located 2.6 km (1.6 mi) south-southeast of Monageer, just south of the Ballyedmond River.

== History ==
The motte was built in the late 12th century after the Norman invasion of Ireland.

== Description ==
Ballymoty Motte is round. A possible causeway post was found to the southeast of the motte during fieldwork.
