= Frank Nugent (disambiguation) =

Frank Nugent was an American writer.

Frank Nugent may also refer to:

- Frank Nugent (cricketer) (1880–1942), British Army officer and cricketer
- Frank Nugent, spy of the Cambridge Five
- Frank Nugent, a character in crime thriller film 16 Blocks
- Frank Nugent, a character in The Secret Seven

== See also ==
- Francis Nugent, Irish priest
