= Irish College =

Centers for educating Irish Catholic clergy

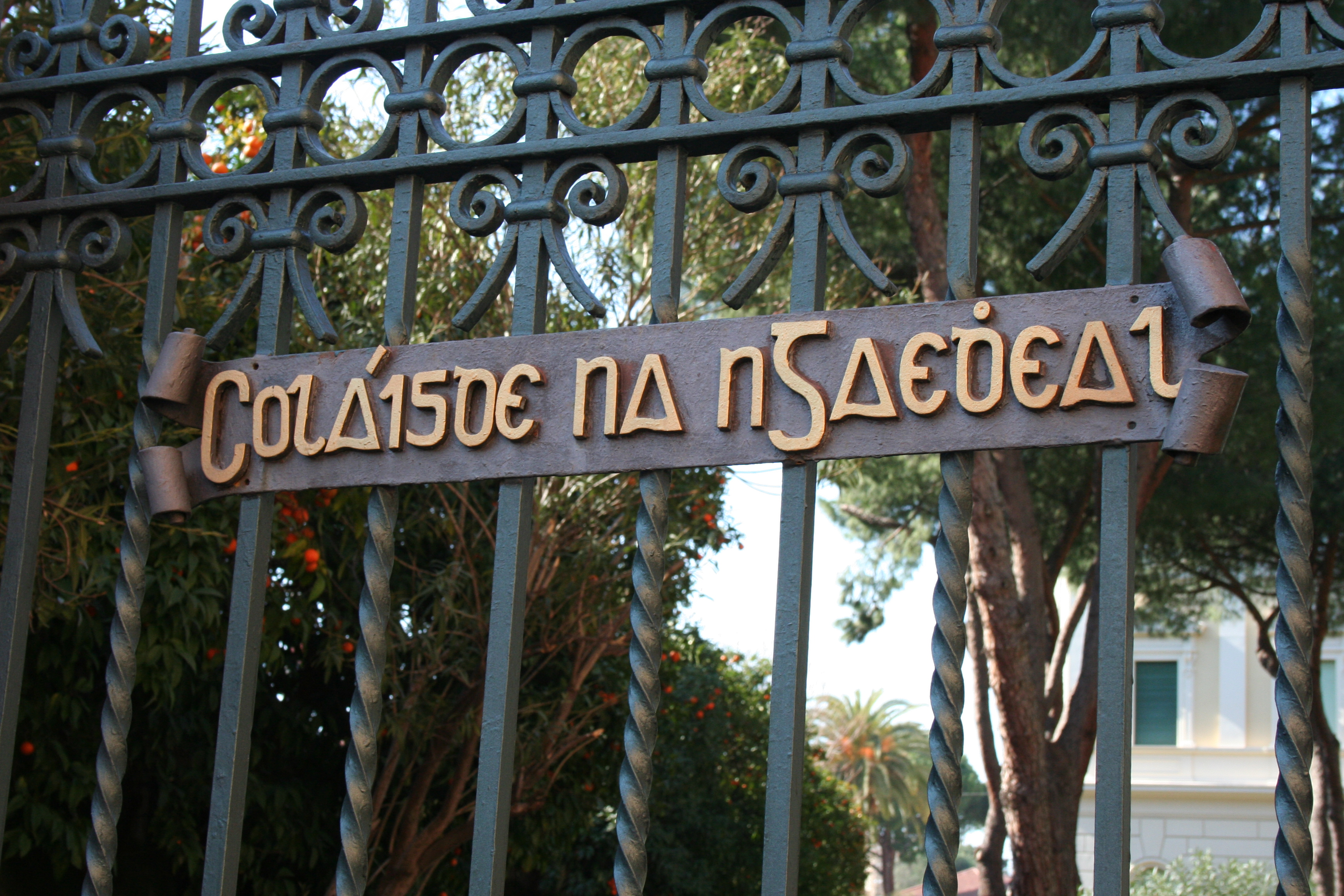
Irish script on the gates of the Pontifical Irish College (Coláisde na nGaedheal), Rome, Italy

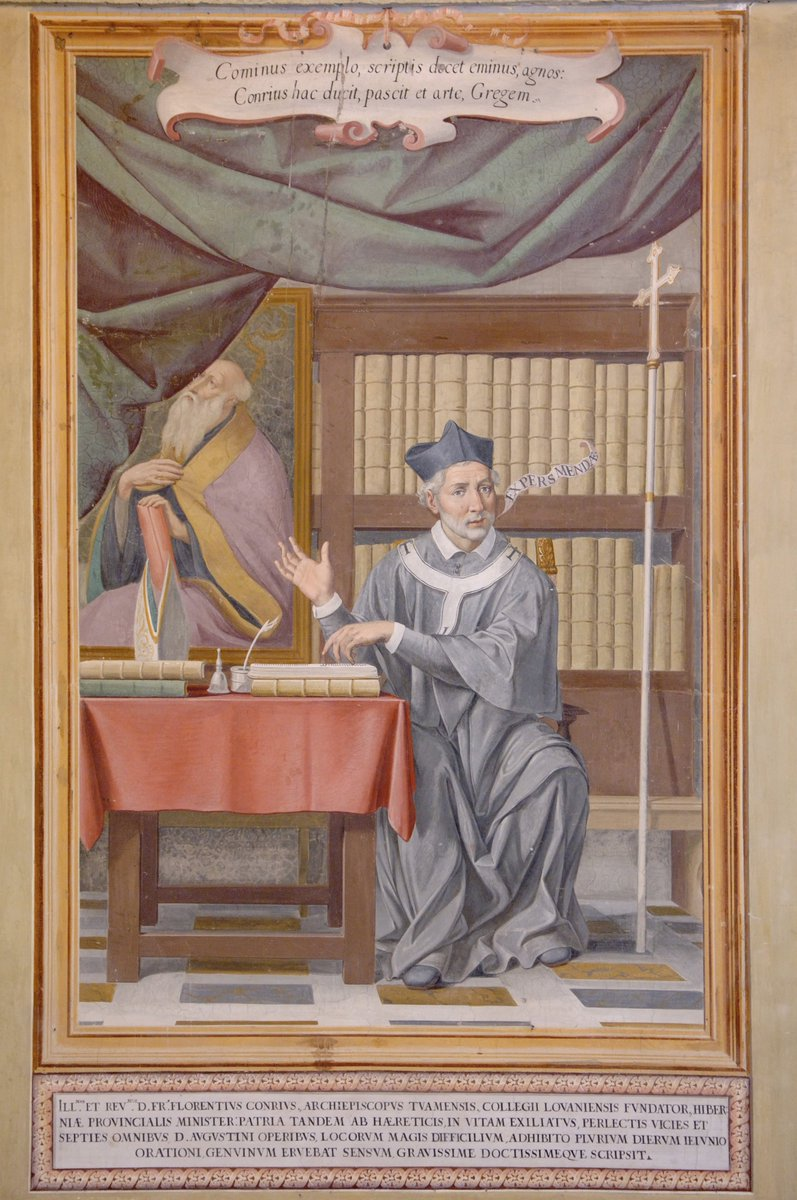
Flaithrí Ó Maolchonaire, founder of an Irish College in Madrid

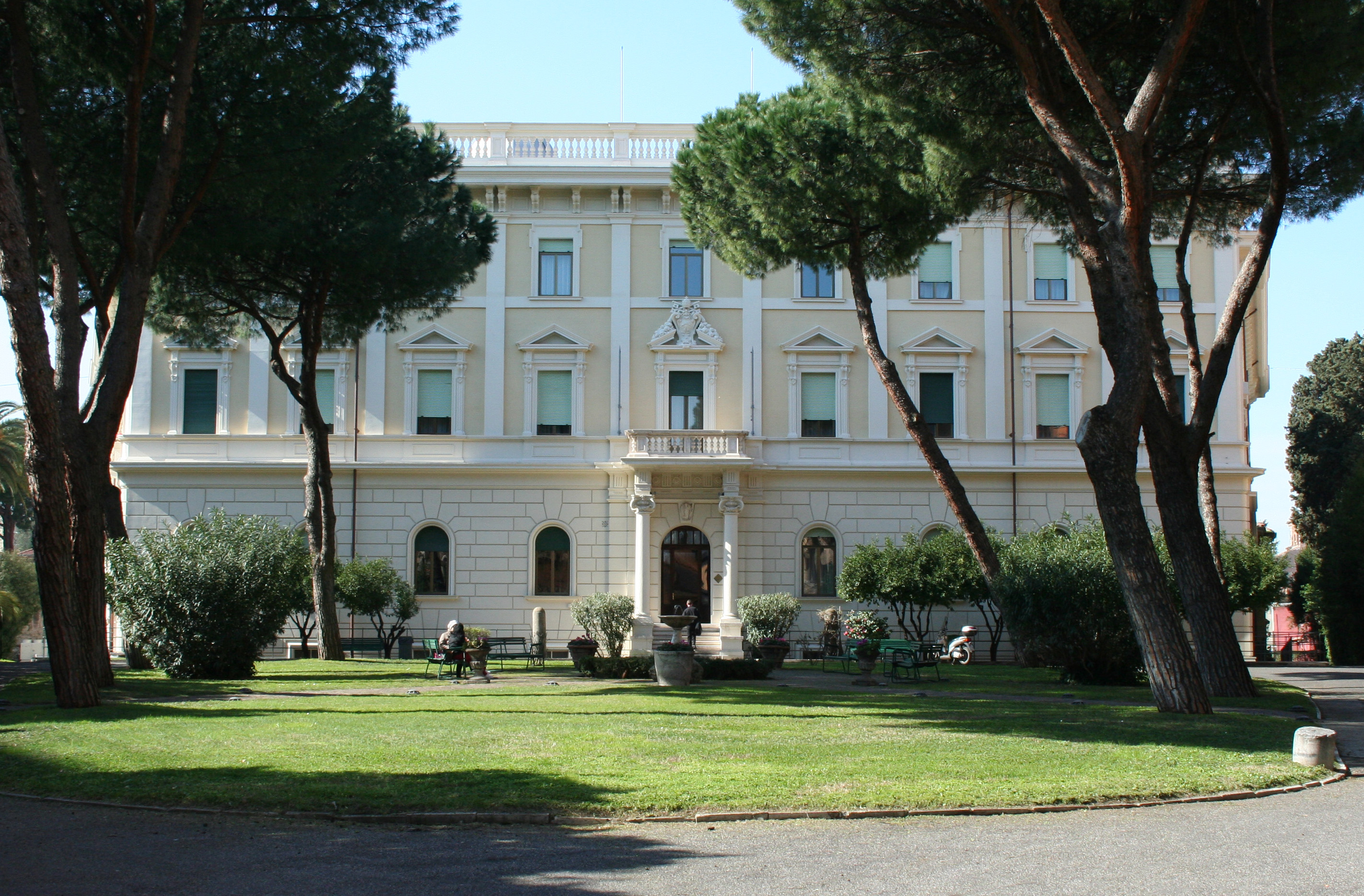
The Pontifical Irish College, Rome, Italy

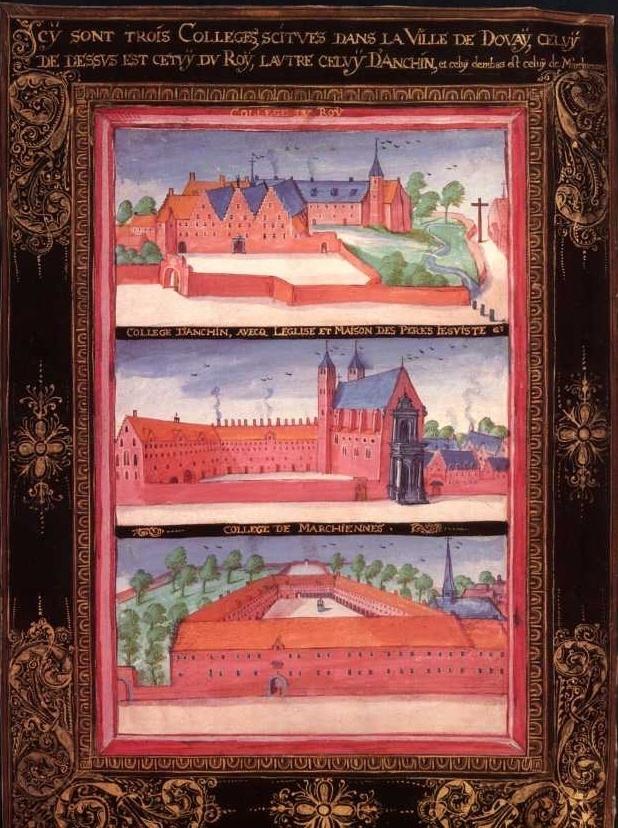
Colleges at University of Douai

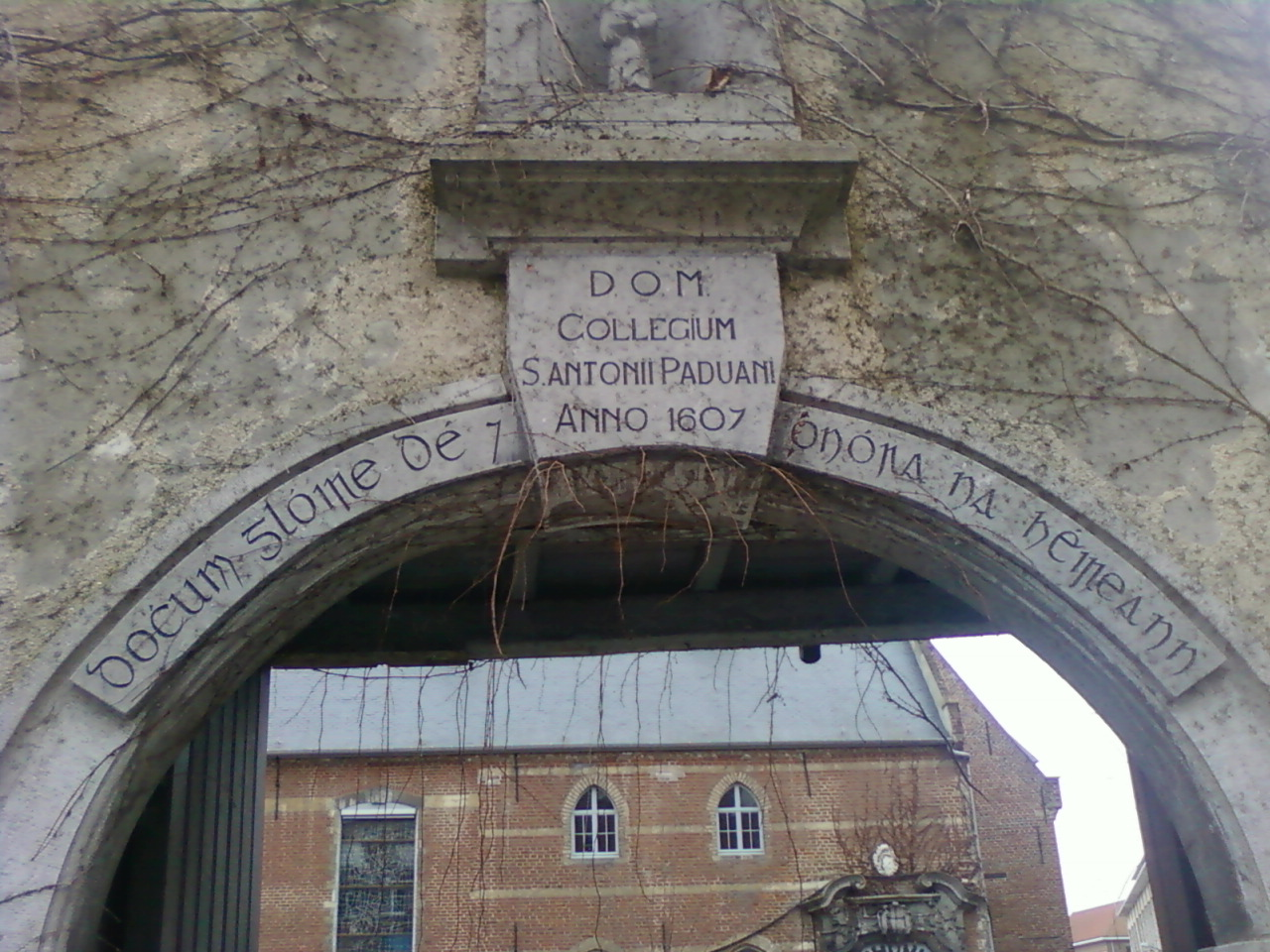
Entrance to the Irish College, Leuven, Belgium. The inscription reads Dochum Glóire Dé agus Ónóra na hÉireann ('For the Glory of God and the Honour of Ireland').

Irish Colleges is the collective name used for approximately 34 centres of education for Irish Catholic clergy and lay people opened on continental Europe in the 16th, 17th and 18th centuries.

== History ==
The Colleges were set up to educate Roman Catholics from Ireland in their own religion following the takeover of the country by the Protestant English state in the Tudor conquest of Ireland. Irish Catholics also left the country to pursue military careers in the Flight of the Wild Geese.

The first Irish Colleges were established in Spain in the 1580s under the supervision of the Jesuit priest James Archer, in Salamanca and Madrid .

There were several early Irish Colleges in Southern Netherlands. St. Patrick Irish college of Douai was founded in 1603 by Christopher Cusack, with the support of Philip III of Spain. The Irish College at Douai was integrated to the Faculty of Theology of the University of Douai in 1610. St Anthony's College, the Irish Franciscan College in Leuven, was co-founded in May 1607 by Aodh Mac Cathmhaoil (also known as Aodh Mac Aingil) and Flaithri Ó Maolconaire, Irish Franciscan, theologian and aide to Aodh Ruadh Ó Domhnaill. The college was founded under the patronage of Philip III of Spain. There was also an Irish Dominican College at Leuven from 1624 until 1797.

The Irish College in Paris was co-founded in 1605 by John Lee and John de l'Escalopier, President of the Parlement of Paris.

More Colleges were established in Rome (1625), Toulouse, Bordeaux, Nantes, Lille, Antwerp and then Prague (1631). Some of the Colleges fell out of use in the late 18th century as the Penal Laws against Roman Catholics in Ireland were relaxed.

Irish colleges were important centres for the writing of Irish history and the preservation of Ireland's rich cultural traditions. Mícheál Ó Cléirigh was sent from an Irish college to Ireland to compile the Annals of the Four Masters, an important chronicle of Irish history. Within the colleges, printing press in the Irish language were established and a collection of the lives of Irish saints was produced. Irish colleges were also helpful for the Irish resistance during the Nine Years' War in Ireland and later exile on the European continent.

On 16 October 1802, Irish colleges located in Toulouse, Bordeaux, Nantes, Douai, Lille, Antwerp, Leuven and Paris were merged under a unique administration, alongside the Scottish College in Douai and Scots College in Paris.

In 1951 The Salamanca Archive, documents relating to the Irish Colleges in Spain were given to the Irish Church and deposited in St. Patrick's College, Maynooth.

In the last decade, the Irish Government has financed the renovation of the premises of the Irish College in Paris which now serves as an Irish Cultural Centre and a residence for Irish students, writers and artists. The Pontifical Irish College in Rome continues to be used for the education and training of Roman Catholic clergy. In 1983 the Irish College in Leuven was made available by the Irish Franciscans for development as a secular resource. The Leuven Institute for Ireland in Europe is now located on the premises.

== List of Irish Colleges ==
=== Italy ===
- Sant’Isidoro a Capo le Case – was established in 1624 as the training center for Franciscan friars from Ireland, it is also the Irish National Church in Rome.
- Franciscan novitiate in Capranica near Sutri, established in 1656
- Irish Augustinian College of San Mateo, Rome, (1656–1661) and from (1739–1798)
- San Clemente in Rome, housed the Irish Dominican College entrusted to them in 1677.
- Pontifical Irish College, Rome (Italy) – trains priests from Ireland and other countries

=== France ===
- Douai – (St. Patrick's College, Douai), founded in 1603 by Fr. Christopher Cusack.
- Paris – now the Irish Cultural Centre
- Bordeaux – established in 1603, set up under the leadership of Rev. Dermot McCarthy, Pope Paul V, recognised it with a papal bull in April 1617. Alumni and staff were buried in the Irish Church, St. Eutrope, Bordeaux, which was given to the Irish. Students studied in the Jesuit College. Rector Rev. Dr. Thadee O Mahony developed the college, and recognised the support of Anne of Austra, they renamed the chapel Saint-Anne-la-Royal. Following the French revolution students were sent home, the last rector of the college, Rev. Martin Glynn, was executed by guillotine during the reign of terror on 19 July 1794. The college closed with its remaining property transferred to the Irish College in Paris.
- Toulouse (le séminaire royal de Sainte Anne') – first established in 1618, the college received royal approval in 1659, followed its sister college in Bordeaux, until it got its own statues in 1752, the college was suppressed in 1793.
- Nantes – established in 1680, last superior Rev. Dr. Patrick Byrne, served as President of Maynooth College (1807–1810). There were 80 scholars and 3 masters in 1808.
- Lille – established in 1610 by Dr. Francis Lavalin Nugent and Fr. Cusack (First rector), it was controlled by the capuchins, but also trained secular clergy, it was confiscated in the French Revolution and sold in 1793. Other rectors include Rev. Patrick Dempsey and Rev. Peter Furlong.
- Poitiers – Jesuit Institution established in 1674 (letters patent granted by Louis XIV), fee paying school, which had burses for trainee clerics, it closed 1762 (following the suppression of the Jesuits). Even before the official establishment of an Irish House in 1674, Irish clerical students would have studied at the University of Poitiers.
- Sedan – The Irish Franciscans had a convent at Bar-su-Aube, Sedan.
- Boulay – was established by the Irish Franciscans in 1700, under the patronage of Leopold, Duke of Lorraine.
- Charleville – established by the Capuchins in 1620.
- Rouen – established in c1612 by Gelasius O'Lorcan.
- La Rochelle – established by the Carmelites in 1665.

Lille and Douai were part of the Spanish Netherlands when they were established.

=== Belgium (Spanish and Austrian Netherlands) ===
- St. Anthony College, Louvain (Franciscan) – in 1607, now the Leuven Institute for Ireland in Europe.
- Pastoral College, Louvain, in 1623 by Rev. Dr Eugene Matthews (MacMahon), who had been archbishop of Dublin, closed in 1795 following French occupation.
- Holy Cross College, Louvain (Dominicans), in 1626. Originally named after St. John the Baptist, then St. Margarets, in 1659, it became Holy Cross; it was suppressed in 1797 following the French Revolution.
- Irish College, Antwerp, opened circa 1600, redeveloped in 1629 by Lawrence Sedgrave, closed in 1795. Sedgraves nephew Rev. James Talbot succeeded him as Rector/President, other Rectors/Presidents include Nicholas Eustace (1642–1677), James Cleer (1677-), John Egan, Martin Caddan, Peter Hennessy, Michael Hennessy (1704–1730), John Kent (1731–1732), Daniel O'Reilly(1732–1747), Hugh MacMahon (1747-1772 & 1774–1787), James MacMahon (1772–1774), and Hugh O'Reilly (1787–1795).
- College of Tournai, founded circa 1616 by Christopher Cusack, closed in 1795. Like the Irish College in Antwerp, it was a satellite college of the Irish College, Douai.

=== Portugal ===
- Irish College, Lisbon
- College of Corpo Santo, Lisbon, was set up in 1633 for the education of Irish Dominican priests, most of the property sold to fund St. Mary's, Tallaght, Dublin, in 1855.

=== Spain ===
- Irish College of San Jorge at Alcalá – founded circa 1590, merged into Salamanca in 1785
- Irish College in Madrid (The College of San Patricio de los Irlandeses in Madrid) - founded by Theobald Stapleton in 1629
- Irish College at Santiago de Compostela – founded in 1605, amalgamated with Salamanca in 1769
- El Real Colegio de San Patricio de Nobles Irlandeses (housed in the Colegio Mayor de Santiago el Zebedeo), Salamanca (1592–1952)
- Irish College in Seville – established c. 1612 by Theobald Stapleton, amalgamated with Irish College, Salamanca in 1769
- Irish College at Valencia – founded in 1628 by Fr. Patrick Tracey

=== Others ===
- College of the Immaculate Conception, Prague (Franciscan) – opened 1629, suppressed in 1786, first Rector: Patrick Fleming from Leuven.
- Wielun, Poland, there was also a Franciscan Irish College, set up in 1645.
- Aix-la-Chapelle, Germany – established by the Carmelites in 1677.

== See also ==
- Early Modern Ireland 1536-1691
- James Bartholomew Blackwell
- Nicholas French
