= Secret Seven (disambiguation) =

Secret Seven may refer to:

- The Secret Seven, a child detective series by Enid Blyton
- The Secret Seven (film), a 1940 American crime film
- The Secret Seven (Frank Richards), a series of stories by Frank Richards
- Secret Seven (TV series), a 2017 Thai TV series
