= Irish college (disambiguation) =

Irish college may refer to:

- Irish College, post-Reformation Irish Catholic seminary in continental Europe
- Gaeltacht § Irish colleges, immersive Irish-language courses run during the summer
- Third-level education in the Republic of Ireland

== See also ==
- Schottenklöster, monastic centres of learning founded in medieval Germany by Irish missionaries
- Notre Dame Fighting Irish, sometimes abbreviated "Irish", college sports teams of the University of Notre Dame, Indiana, U.S.
