= Irish College in Madrid =

Former seminary

Irish College at Madrid
- Spanish: El Colegio De San Patricio de los Irlandeses de Madrid
- Type: Seminary
- Active: 1629–1819
- Founders: Theobald Stapleton
- Religious affiliation: Roman Catholic

Irish College, Madrid (El Colegio De San Patricio de los Irlandeses de Madrid) was one of the Irish Colleges founded on continental Europe to train Catholic priests for Ireland during the Penal Laws. The college was founded by Theobald Stapleton in 1629. A Hospital (Hospital de San Patricio de los Irlandeses) and church (La Iglesia de los Irlandeses or Church of San Patrico) was also established along with the college.

Stapleton was succeeded by Don Dermisio O'Brien, chaplain to Philip IV, who gave to the college his own house in the Calle del Humilladero. While in exile from Ireland and in 1677 living in Madrid, the Archbishop of Tuam James Lynch tried to develop the college. In 1768, Charles III took the establishment under his royal patronage.

There was also an Irish clerical presence in the Madrid area with the Irish Dominicans training at a convent of Our Lady of Atocha, Madrid. Also Irish clerical students would have studied in the university town of Alcalá de Henares, outside Madrid, where the Irish College at Alcala was established.

Unlike the other Irish Colleges in Spain which merged into the Irish College at Salamanca in the late eighteenth century, the Madrid college persisted on for a few more years. With the relaxation of the anti-catholic laws and the establishment of seminaries in Ireland such as Maynooth College in 1796, there was less and less need for Irish colleges on the continent.

The Rector-Administrator, Don Pedro Perlines, left Madrid in 1819, and the college was wound down debts were settled and properties sold. During the Spanish Civil War a number of the buildings which were part of the Irish college were destroyed.

== Rectors ==
- Theobald Stapleton, founder and first rector
- Don Dermisio O'Brien
- Juan Magrane
- Gerardo Plunkett (–1751), served as Rector of the college in Alcalá de Henares
- Don Arturo Magennis (1751–1759)
- Don Guillermo Navin
- Don Pedro Perlines (1792–1819), the last rector

Records of the Irish colleges in Spain, including Madrid, are housed in the Russell Library, in St Patrick's College, Maynooth.
