= Andrew Dunne (priest) =

Irish priest, President of Maynooth College 1803-1807

Andrew Dunne was an Irish priest who served as President of Maynooth College from 1803 until 1807. Born in Dublin, and educated at the Irish College in Bordeaux, France, he became a priest in the Diocese of Dublin. At the foundation of the St. Patrick's College, Maynooth, Dunne was appointed Secretary to the Board of Trustees and in 1800, he served as treasurer/bursar and became the college's first librarian, with his one collection some 3000 volumes forming the basis of the library initially, he also acted as Vice-President due to the absence of the office holder. Following his tenure as college president, during which he was not considered a high calibre theologian, he was appointed parish priest of St. Catherine's and re-appointed secretary to the trustees of the college.

He returned to live in the college again, serving as librarian and treasurer, until he died on 17 June 1823. He is buried in the college cemetery.
