= Irish College in Bordeaux =

Former Catholic seminary

Irish College Bordeaux
- French: Collège des Irlandais, Bordeaux
- Type: Seminary
- Active: 1603–1794
- Founders: Fr. Dermot McCarthy and Archbishop de Sourdis
- Religious affiliation: Roman Catholic
- Academic affiliations: University of Bordeaux
- Location: Rue du Hâ, Bordeaux.

Irish College Bordeaux– established in 1603, set up under the leadership of Rev. Dermot McCarthy (a priest of the Diocese of Cork), invited by Cardinal François de Sourdis, Archbishop of Bordeaux to set up an Irish College in the city, and affiliated to the University of Bordeaux. McCarthy arrived with forty students from Ireland in November 1603. Pope Paul V, recognised it with a papal bull of the 26 April 1617. Due to an increase in the number of students, in 1618, a number of students were sent to other colleges. Alumni and staff were buried in the Irish Church, St. Eutrope, Bordeaux, which was given to the Irish. Students studied in the Jesuit College. Rector Rev. Dr. Thadee O Mahony developed the college, and recognising the support of Anne of Austria (wife of Louis XIII), they renamed the chapel Saint-Anne-la-Royal. Following endowment in 1654, alumni were granted French naturalisation, which meant a number of alumni stayed and ministered in France. The Irish College in Toulouse (1618-1793) was a sister college also supported by Anne of Austria, it followed the Bordeaux statues until it was constituted with its own statues.

Following the French Revolution students were sent home, and the last rector of the college, Rev. Martin Glynn, was executed by guillotine during the Reign of Terror on 19 July 1794. The college closed with its remaining property (and burses) transferred to the Irish College in Paris. The properties in Bordeaux were sold in 1880.

Rue Mc Carthy is named after the first superior in the college.

The buildings Collège des Irlandais was situated on rue du Hâ, Bordeaux, and the now demolished Chapelle des Irlandais, place Pey Berland.

== People Associated with the Irish College Bordeaux ==
- Rev. Dr. Robert Barry, Bishop of Cork and Cloyne, studied at the college
- Rev. Dr. Dominic Bellew, Bishop of Killala
- Baron Tobias Bourke, studied at the college
- Rev. Patrick Comerford, O.E.S.A., Bishop of Waterford and Lismore studied at the college
- Rev. Andrew Dunne, returned to Ireland, served as President of St. Patrick's College, Maynooth (1803-1807)
- Abbe Henry Essex Edgeworth, studied at the college, before going to Paris
- Rev. Dr. Boetius Egan, Archbishop of Tuam
- Rev. Dr. Patrick Everard, future President of Maynooth College and Archbishop of Cashel, studied at Bordeaux, and served as president and vice-president
- Rev. Martin Glynn, former student, served and last rector, executed by Guillotine during the reign of terror.
- Joseph-Ignace Guillotin, (in)famous for proposing the Guillotine for execution following the French Revolution, was a professor of literature at the college
- Rev. Dr. Geoffrey Keating, priest, poet, and historian, was one of the original 40 students who went to Bordeaux with Rev. McCarthy
- Rev. Dr. Robert Lacy, Bishops of Limerick, served as Rector
- Rev. Michael Murphy, Priest in the Ferns diocese, United Irishman killed in the 1798 Rebellion.
- Rev. Dr. Cornelius O'Keeffe, Bishop of Limerick
- Rev. Dr. Richard O'Reilly, Archbishop of Armagh, commenced his priestly studies in Bordeaux, before going to Rome
- Rev. Cornelius O’Scanlan served as rector of the college at Bordeaux
- Dr Niall O'Glacan, plague doctor, later to become court physician to Louis XIII

=== Superiors / Rectors ===
- Diarmuid MacCeallachan MacCarthy, founder 1603 died 1621.
- Dr Jacques Piers succeeded MacCarthy in 1621
- Kilian Carteus [MacCarthy] elected July 1630
- Thomas Giraidin [FitzGerald] elected 20 June 1633
- Kilian Carteus re-elected 1648
- Daniel Morphoeus [Murphy] 1648
- Dr Cornelius (O')Scanlan elected in November 1648 succeeding Murphy, re-elected 1661, 1665 and 1669
- Dr Guillaume Fleming elected September 1669, re-elected 1675 and 1678 serving until he died in June 1682
- Francois de la Hide elected 11 June 1682 resigned 28 August 1684
- Dr Thadee O'Mahony succeeded, 1684
- Jean Goiman elected 24 December 1687
- Dr Thadee O'Mahony re-elected 1696
- Maurice Leo (Leyne) elected 4 January 1717
- Richard Rally elected 29 March 1726
- Ignace 0'Connor elected April 1729
- Andre Magdonnocb 1733
- Dr Robert Lacy STD succeeded, re-appointed by the archbishop of Bordeaux, 1736
- Daniel 0'Dea appointed 1736 serving until 1748
- Corneille Ryan appointed 1748 serving until 1759
- Martin Glynn appointed 1766 serving until 1786
- Dr Patrice (Patrick) Everard appointed 1786 (and later Vicar General of the Diocese of Bordeaux) serving until October 1793 when he returned to Ireland

== See also ==
- Irish College
- Irish College at Paris
