= Sack of Cashel =

English Parliamentarian sack and slaughter of the Confederate Ireland-held city of Cashel

Coordinates: 52.52°N 7.89°W

- Part of the Irish Confederate Wars
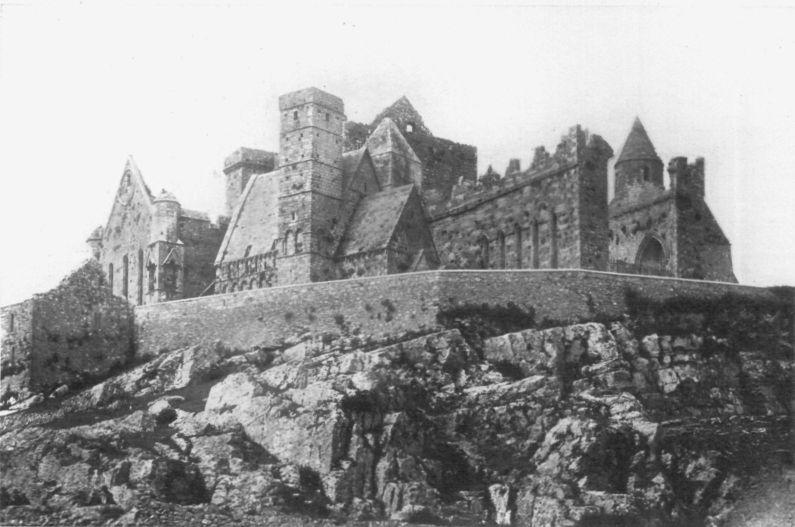
- The Rock of Cashel, the citadel in which the defenders of Cashel attempted to hold off the assault
Date	15 September 1647
Location	Cashel, County Tipperary
Result	Parliamentarian victory

Belligerents
Irish Confederates	(England) English Parliamentarians

Commanders and leaders
Lt-Colonel Butler (executed)	Baron Inchiquin

Strength
c. 300 (excluding civilians)	c. 2,500

Casualties and losses
c. 500–800 (including civilians)	c. 300

Ireland and Rock of Cashel

The sack of Cashel, also known as the massacre of Cashel, took place on 15 September 1647 during the Irish Confederate Wars, when Cashel Castle in County Tipperary was taken by a Protestant Parliamentarian army commanded by the Baron of Inchiquin. In what is considered one of the most brutal incidents of the war, survivors of the Catholic garrison were executed along with a number of civilians and the castle was sacked.

== The Munster mutiny ==
The sack of Cashel occurred against the background of a complex conflict in the south of Ireland. In 1642, most of the province of Munster had fallen to Irish Catholic rebels with the exception of Cork city and a few towns along the south coast, which remained in the hands of Protestant settlers. For five years, the province had been fought over by the Irish Confederation and Protestants, led by the Baron of Inchiquin.

The political and military situation was further fragmented by the First English Civil War in which the Catholics gave their support to Charles I, and the Protestants after 1643 to the Parliament of England. What was more, the Irish Confederates were themselves split over the terms on which they should sign a peace deal with the King. A deep rift developed within their ranks in 1647 between those who were prepared to accept a mere toleration of Catholicism in return for an alliance with the English Royalists and those who in effect wanted Ireland to be a Catholic kingdom, albeit under the sovereignty of the Stuart monarchy. This infighting was to fatally hamper the war effort of the Confederates in Munster and make possible the Protestant sack of Cashel.

On 12 June 1647, Donough MacCarthy, the Viscount of Muskerry entered the camp of the Irish Confederate Munster army. The Viscount Muskerry was probably the most powerful Confederate leader in Munster and was known to be sympathetic to the powerful Irish Royalist Ormonde. At that time, the Munster army was commanded by the Earl of Glamorgan, an English Catholic nobleman who had been granted command of the army by the Confederate Supreme council for reasons of political expediency, being aligned neither to the Royalist nor clerical faction.

Glamorgan was not popular, partly because he was English but also because he lacked money to regularly pay the soldiers. Muskerry was unsatisfied with the direction the Irish Confederate Supreme Council was headed under the influence of Rinuccinni and realised that he was in a position to influence the army of Munster and thereby strengthen his hand.

He won the army over within an hour. A ceremony was afterwards arranged in which Glamorgan handed over command to Muskerry but this was merely to save face. Muskerry desired to turn his full attention to the politics of the Irish Confederations supreme council, and so immediately after the ceremony, Muskerry resigned in favour of Theobald Taaffe, a nobleman who had joined the Irish Confederates but who was known to be sympathetic to Royalism. Unfortunately for the Confederates, Lord Taaffe was one of the most incompetent leaders to command an Irish army during the 1640s.

Even worse, while the Munster Army was paralysed by the intrigues of its commanders, Inchiquin's Protestant forces had embarked on a highly destructive campaign in Confederate-held territory.

== Inchiquin's offensive ==
In the summer of 1647, the Baron of Inchiquin, commander of the Protestant army in Munster, commenced a campaign against Catholic strongholds in County Limerick and County Clare, then in early September captured Cahir Castle in County Tipperary. This provided him a secure base for raiding the surrounding countryside, largely unopposed by Lord Taaffe, probably the result of the political scheming of Muskerry and other powerful Irish clan chief who hoped to keep the Munster army intact for their own ends. As a result, Inchiquin was able to advance on Cashel, County Tipperary, a significant economic and ecclesiastical centre.

== The attack ==
Inchiquin had already launched two minor raids against Cashel, and he now had the opportunity to launch a major assault. The Parliamentarian forces first stormed nearby Roche Castle, putting fifty warders to the sword. This attack terrified the local inhabitants of the region, some of whom fled to hiding places, while hundreds of others fled promptly to the Rock of Cashel, a stronger place than the town itself. Lord Taaffe had placed six companies in the fortified churchyard that sat upon the rock, and considered the place defensible, though he himself did not stay to put it to the test, leaving command to the Governor Lieutenant-Colonel Butler.

Arriving with his army at the Rock, Inchiquin called for surrender within an hour. The defenders of the churchyard offered to negotiate, but that was refused, and on the afternoon of 15 September the assault commenced. The Parliamentarians were first reminded of earlier atrocities against Protestants and then began to deploy. The attack was led by around 150 dismounted horse officers (who wore more armour than the foot) with the remainder of the infantry following; troops of horse rode along the flanks of the advancing force to encourage the infantry. The Irish soldiers attempted to drive off the attackers with pikes while the civilians inside hurled rocks down from the walls: in turn, the attackers hurled firebrands into the compound, setting some of the buildings inside on fire. Although many were wounded, the Parliamentarians gradually fought their way over the walls, pushing the garrison into the church.

Initially, the Irish defenders managed to protect the Church, holding off the attackers trying to get through the doors, but the Parliamentarians then placed numerous ladders against the many windows in the church and swarmed the building. For another half an hour, fighting raged inside the church, until the depleted defenders retreated up the bell tower. Only sixty soldiers of the garrison remained at this point, and they thus accepted a call to surrender. However, after they had descended the tower and thrown their swords away, all were killed.

== The sack ==
In the end, all the soldiers (save a single major) and most of the civilians on the Rock were killed by the attackers. The Bishop and Mayor of Cashel along with a few others survived by taking shelter in a secret hiding place. Apart from these a few women were spared, after being stripped of their clothes, and a small number of wealthy civilians were taken prisoner, but these were the exceptions. Overall, close to 1,000 were killed, amongst them Lieutenant-Colonel Butler and Roman Catholic priest and Irish language orthography pioneer Teabóid Gálldubh, who was Beatified as one of the Irish Catholic Martyrs by Pope John Paul II in 1992. The bodies in the churchyard were described by a witness as being five or six deep.

The slaughter was followed by extensive plunder and sacrilege. There was much of value inside, for apart from pictures, chalices and vestments of the church, many of the slain civilians had also brought their valuables with them. The sword and mace of the mayor of Cashel, as well as the coach of the bishop, were captured. The plunder was accompanied by acts of iconoclasm against Christian art, with statues smashed and pictures defaced. The deserted town of Cashel was also torched. Lord Inchiquin was even alleged to have put on the Archbishop's vestments and mitre in mockery of Roman Catholicism.

== Aftermath ==
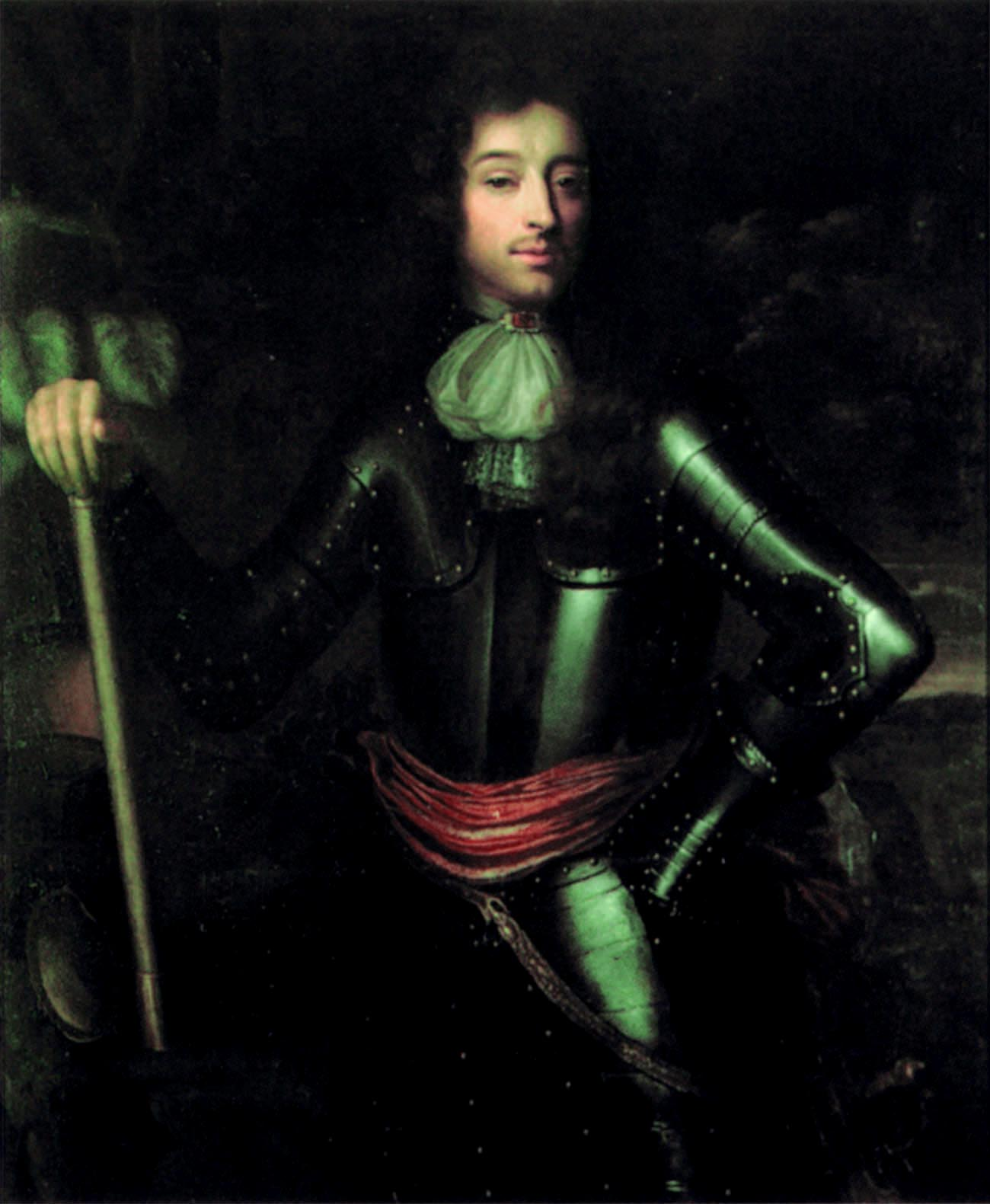
Murrough the Burner.

The atrocity at Cashel caused a deep impact in Ireland, as it was the worst single atrocity committed in Ireland since the start of fighting in 1641. Previously, the most infamous massacre amongst the Catholic population was that at Timolin in 1643, when 200 civilians were killed by Ormonde's English Royalist army, but many more than this were killed at Cashel, and the Rock of Cashel was one of the chief holy places of the Catholic Church in Ireland. The slaughter of the garrison at Cashel and the subsequent devastation of Catholic-held Munster earned Inchiquin the Irish nickname, Murchadh na Dóiteáin or "Murrough of the Burnings".

The political ramifications in the Irish confederation were also profound, serving to exacerbate the split between the Catholic party headed by Giovanni Battista Rinuccini and those sympathetic to the Royalist lord Ormonde. The former were enraged by the attack and desired retribution against Inchiquin and his army, but the Ormondist faction saw the Sack of Cashel and a subsequent raid by Inchiquin's men into County Kilkenny as evidence of the futility of defending Ireland without Royalist support. In the short term, Lord Taffe came under intense pressure from the Confederate leadership to engage Inchiquin. When he did so in November, the politically divided and badly led Munster army was routed and destroyed at the Battle of Knocknanuss. This was the second Confederate army to be destroyed in less than six months, the Leinster Army having been annihilated at the battle of Dungans Hill in August.

In consequence, the Confederates had no option but to sign a truce with Inchiquin, an act which deeply alienated many Confederates and Catholic clergy, who had been appalled at Inchiquin's brutal tactics in Munster. These divisions would lead to the brief but bloody Irish Confederate Civil War in 1648. Inchiquin withdrew his support for the English Parliament in the same year and entered into a Royalist alliance with the Confederates.

Despite the massacre, Inchiquin converted to Roman Catholicism while in exile in France in 1656.

== See also ==
- List of massacres in Ireland

== General references ==
- Inchiquin (9 October 2008). "The Sack of Cashel, September 1647". Inchiquin.
- Manning, Rober (2006). An Apprenticeship in Arms: The Origin of the British Army 1585-1702. Oxford.
- Stevenson, David (1980). Alasdair MacColla and the Highland problem in the seventeenth century. Edinburgh.
