= Rock of Cashel =

Historic ecclesiastical site in Ireland

- Carraig Phádraig (Irish)
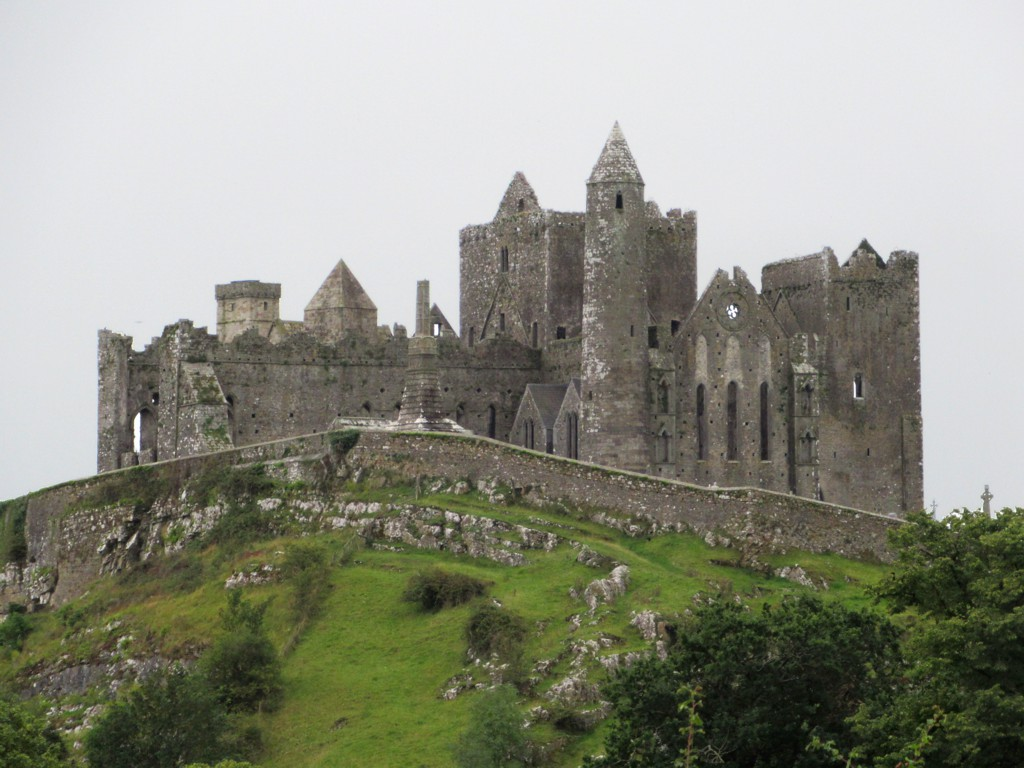

- Location of Rock of Cashel in Ireland
- 52°31′12″N 7°53′24″W
- Location: Cashel, County Tipperary, Ireland

History
- Built: From 12th century

Site notes
- Website: heritageireland.ie/places-to-visit/rock-of-cashel/

National monument of Ireland
- Reference no.: 128

The Rock of Cashel (Irish: Carraig Phádraig [ˈkaɾˠəɟ ˈfˠaːd̪ˠɾˠəɟ]), also known as Cashel of the Kings and St. Patrick's Rock, is a historical site located dramatically above a plain at Cashel, County Tipperary, Ireland.

== History ==
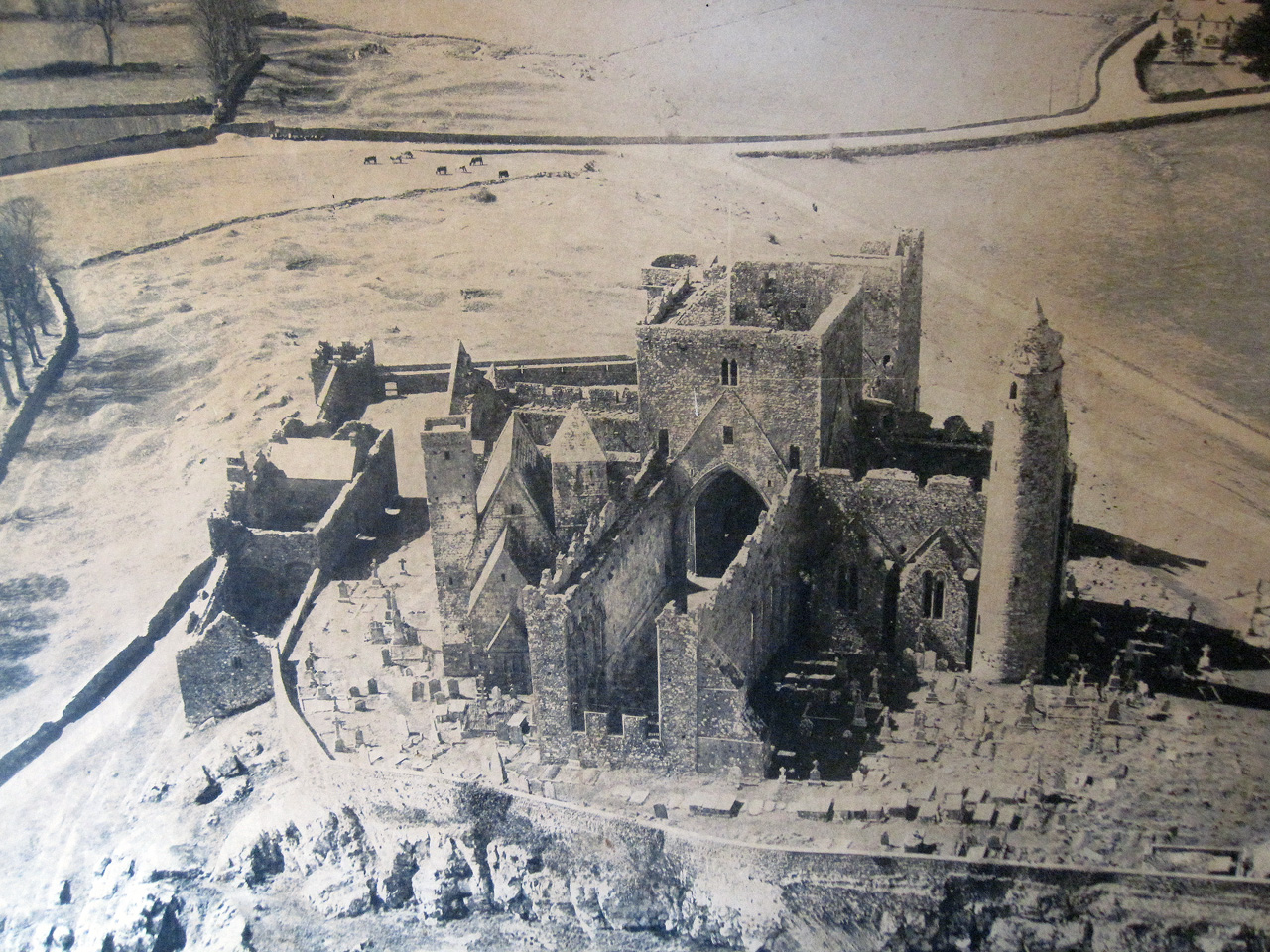
Aerial view c. 1970, prior to modern restoration

According to local legends, the Rock of Cashel originated in the Devil's Bit, a mountain 20 miles (30 km) north of Cashel when St. Patrick banished Satan from a cave, resulting in the Rock's landing in Cashel. According to the Tripartite Life of Saint Patrick Cashel is reputed to be the site of the conversion of the King of Munster by Saint Patrick in the 5th century.

The Rock of Cashel was the traditional seat of the kings of Munster as early as the 4th century and prior to the Norman invasion. In the 5th century the Eóganachta clan built a fortress at Cashel retaining supremacy there for hundreds of years. In 977 Brian Boru was crowned there as king and made Cashel his capital. In 1101, the King of Munster, Muirchertach Ua Briain, donated his fortress on the Rock to the Church. The picturesque complex has a character of its own and is one of the most remarkable collections of Celtic art and medieval architecture to be found anywhere in Europe. Few remnants of the early structures survive; the majority of buildings on the current site date from the 12th and 13th centuries.

In 1647, during the Irish Confederate Wars, Cashel was sacked by English Parliamentarian troops under Murrough O'Brien, 1st Earl of Inchiquin. The Irish Confederate troops there were massacred, as were the Catholic clergy, including Theobald Stapleton. Inchiquin's troops looted or destroyed many important religious artefacts.

Sometime during or after the mid-1730s, the main cathedral roof was destroyed by Arthur Price, the Anglican Archbishop of Cashel. Today, what remains of the Rock of Cashel has become a tourist attraction. Price's decision to remove the roof on what had been called the jewel among Irish church buildings was criticised before and since.

The Rock of Cashel played a role in the history of the Whiteboy movement, with a large number of Whiteboys having levelled the wall surrounding it in 1763 in a celebrated moment. This was part of a period of Whiteboy activity between 1763 and 1765 during which they agitated all over Tipperary, including the limestone district of Cashel.

Queen Elizabeth II visited the Rock of Cashel during her 2011 visit to Ireland.

== Buildings on the Rock ==
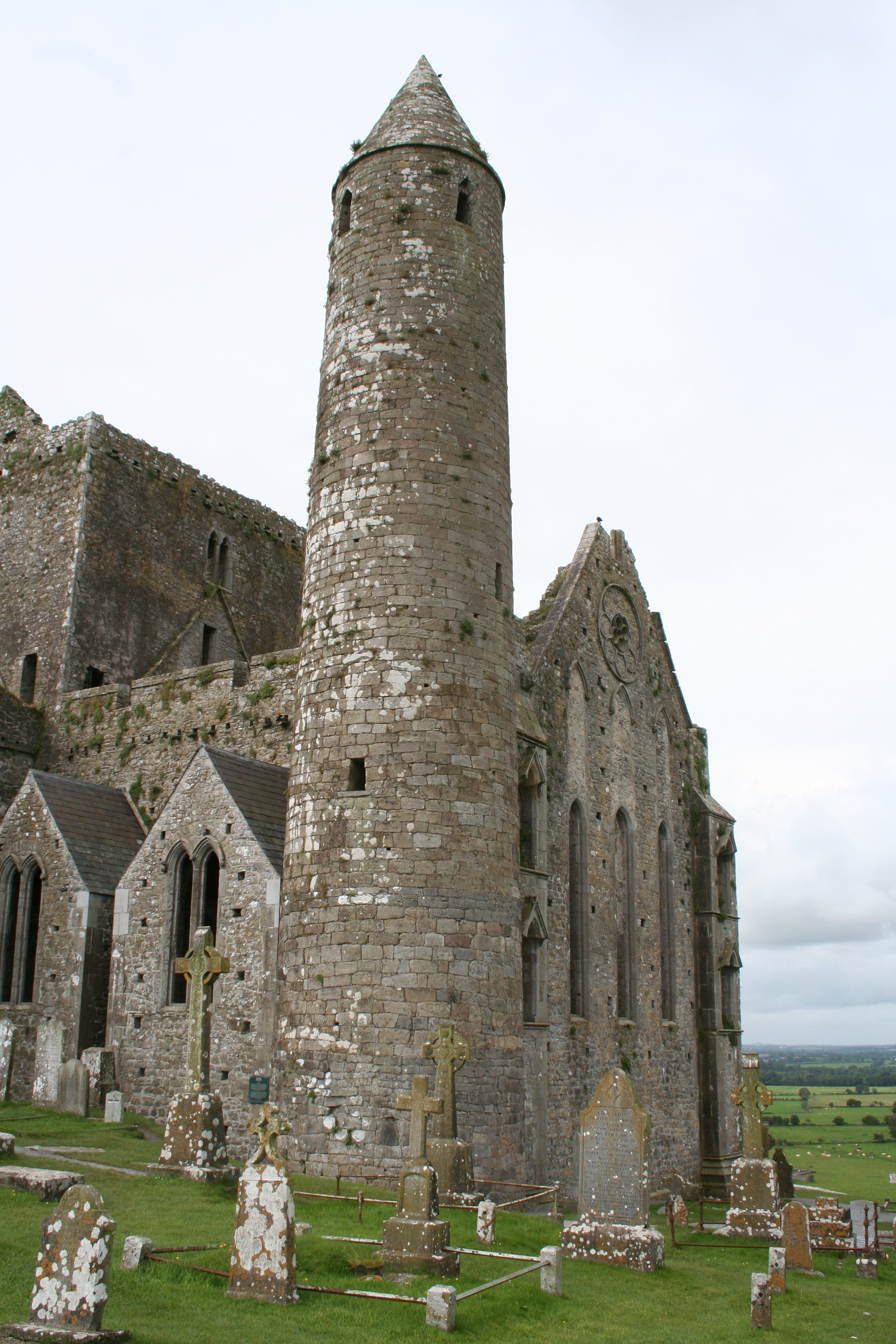
The Round Tower beside the cathedral

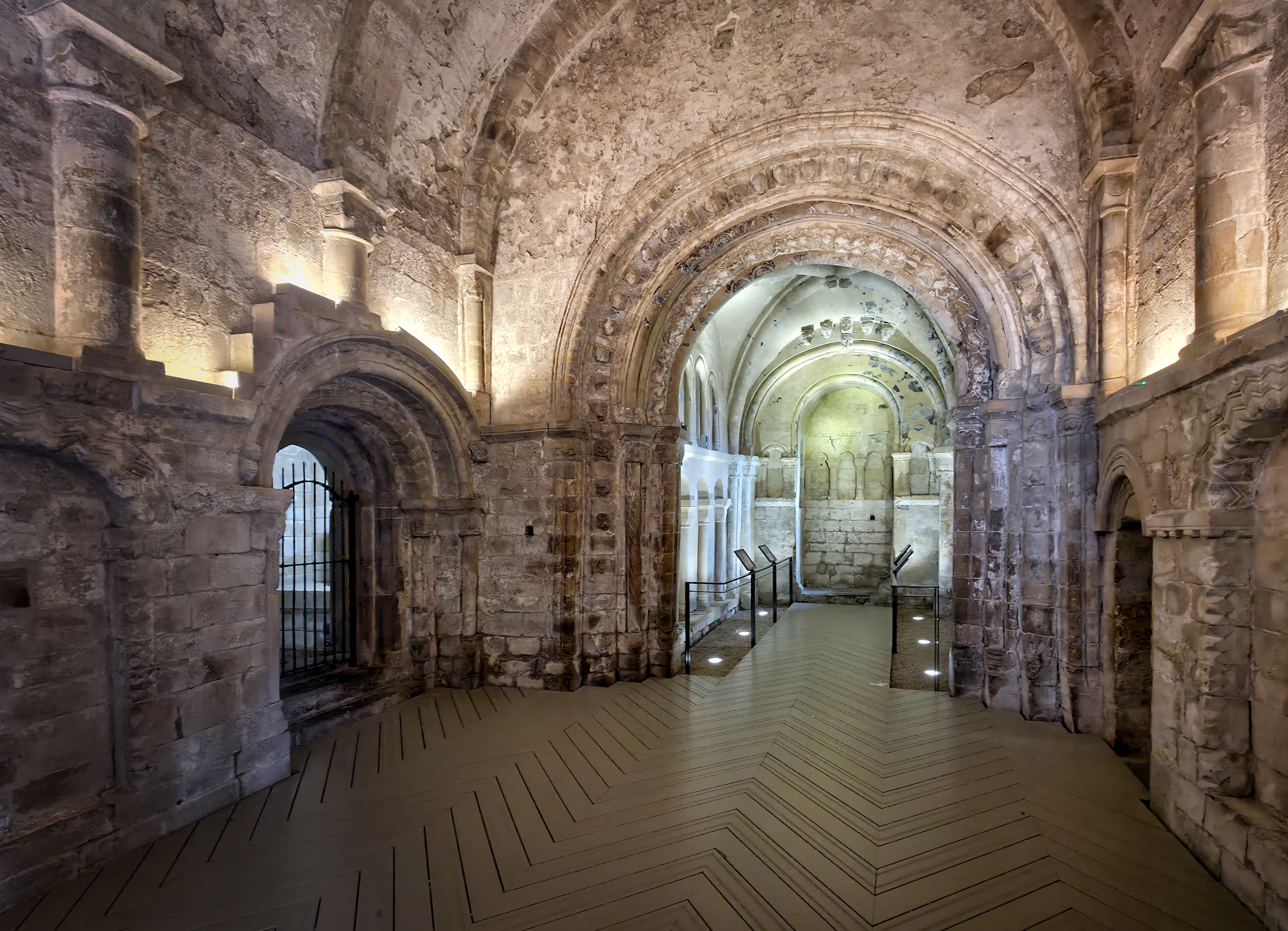
Chapel nave looking into the chancel

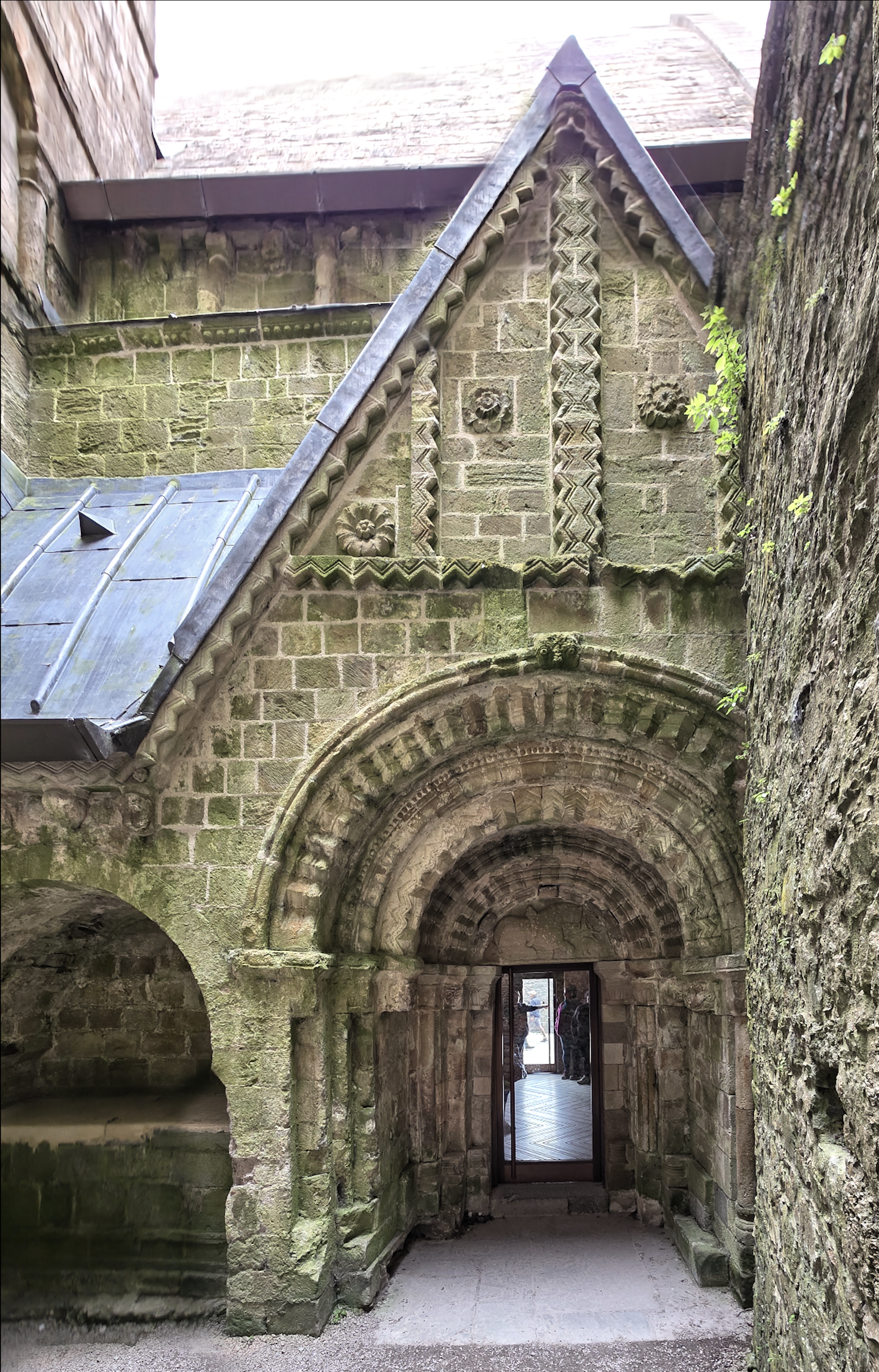
Gabled Arch: the first of its kind, it inspired other gabled arches in Ireland and became an icon of the Hiberno-Romanesque style

=== The Round Tower ===
The oldest and tallest of the structure is the well preserved round tower 28 metres (92 ft) high, dating from c.1100. Its entrance is 3.7 metres (12 ft) from the ground, necessitated by a shallow foundation (about 1 metre (3 feet)) typical of round towers. The tower was built using the dry stone method. Modern conservationists have filled in some of the tower with mortar for safety reasons.

=== Cormac's Chapel ===
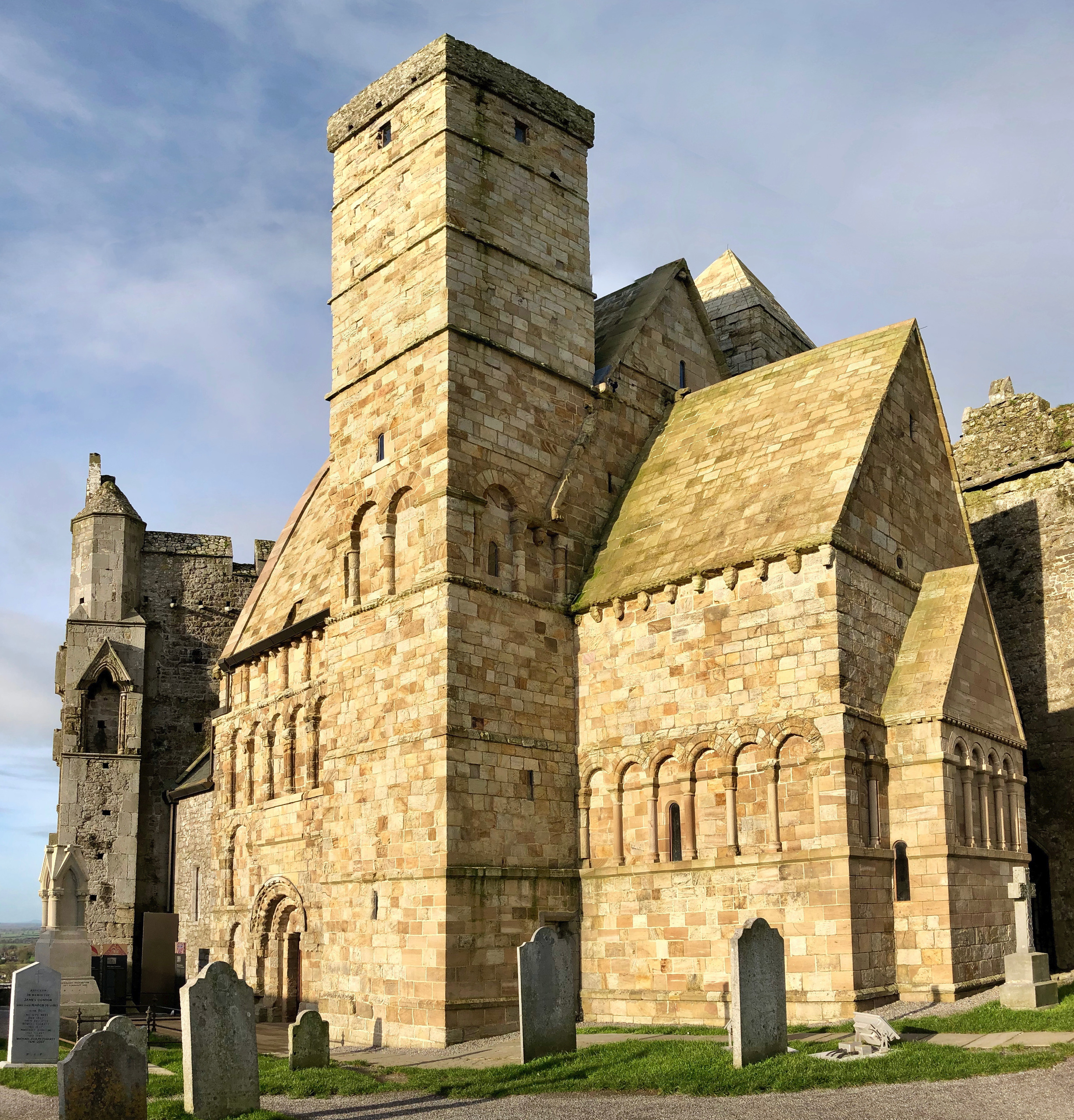
Cormac’s chapel with parts of the Cathedral on either side

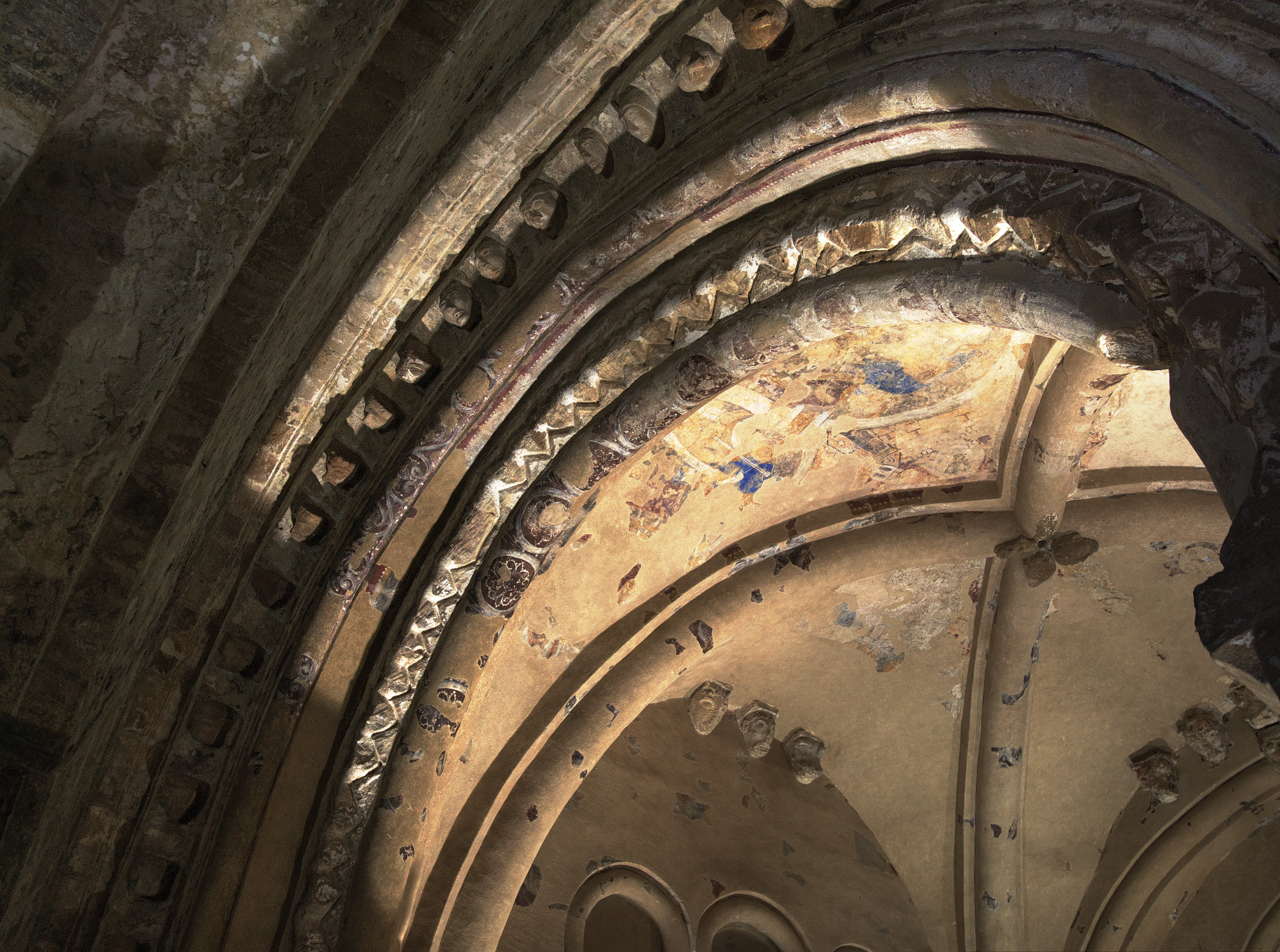
Carvings and frescoes inside the chapel

Cormac's Chapel, the chapel of King Cormac Mac Carthaigh, was begun in 1127 and consecrated in 1134. It is a sophisticated structure, with vaulted ceilings and wide arches, drawing on contemporary European architecture and infusing unique native elements. The Irish Abbot of Regensburg, Dirmicius of Regensburg, sent two of his carpenters to help in the work and the twin towers on either side of the junction of the nave and chancel are strongly suggestive of their Germanic influence, as this feature is otherwise unknown in Ireland. Other notable features of the building include interior and exterior arcading, a barrel-vaulted roof, a carved tympanum over both doorways, the magnificent north doorway, ogive arched chancel and the oldest stairs in Ireland. It contains the only surviving Romanesque frescoes in Ireland. The chapel was constructed primarily of sandstone which has become waterlogged over the centuries, significantly damaging the interior frescoes. Restoration and preservation required the chapel be completely enclosed in a rain-proof structure with interior dehumidifiers to dry out the stone. It is now open for limited tours to the public.

=== Cathedral ===
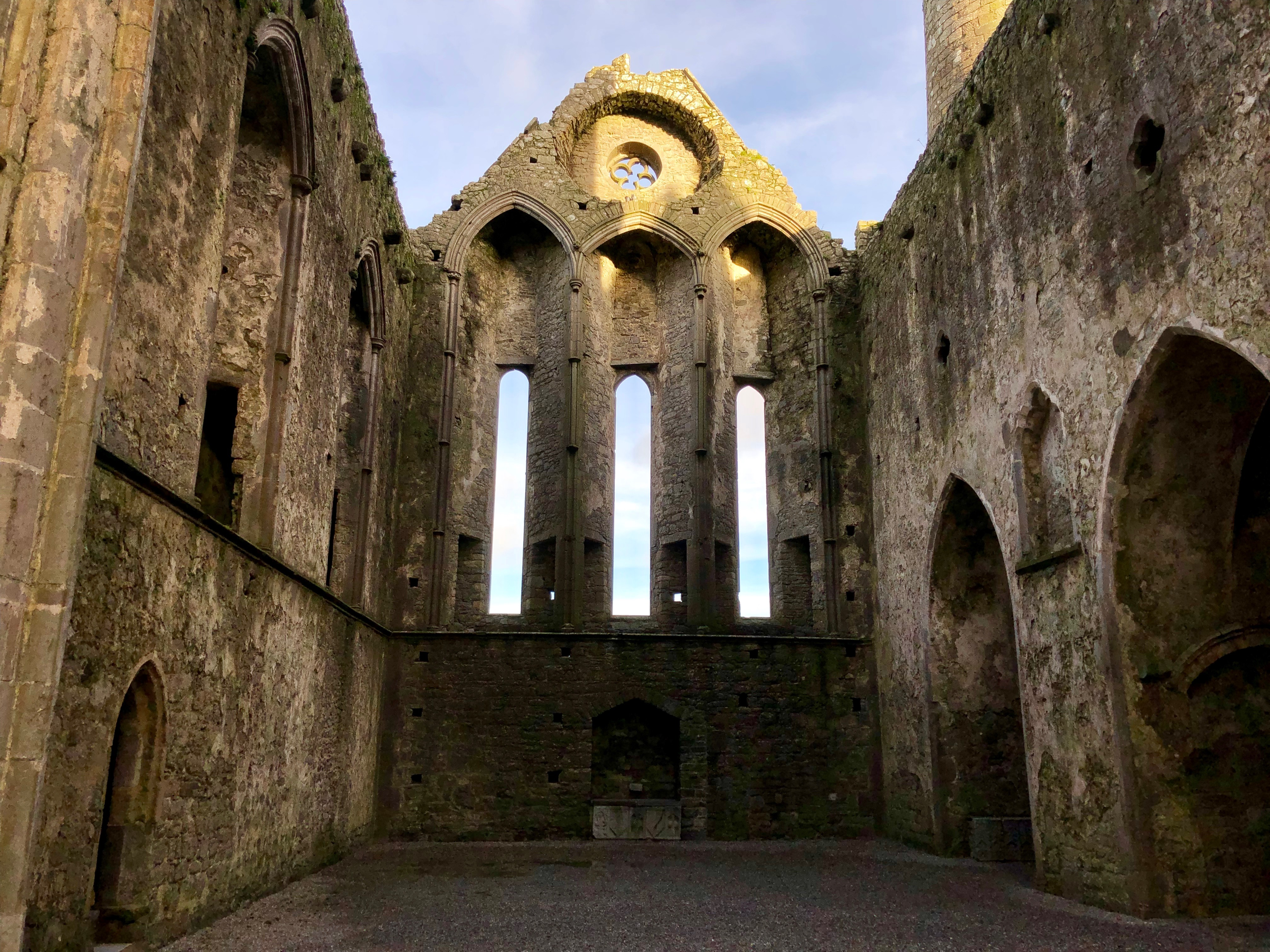
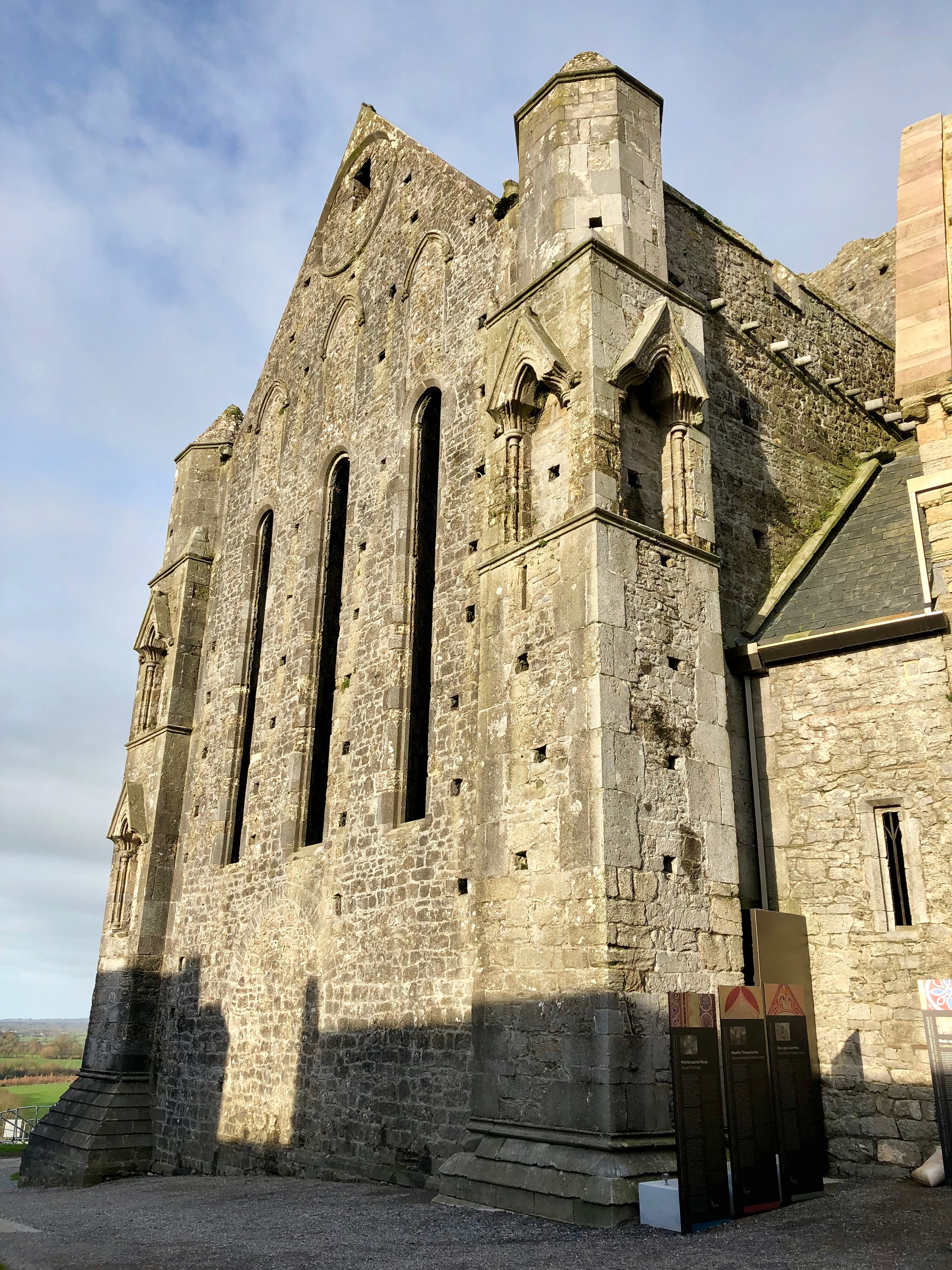
A roofless portion of the cathedral

The cathedral, built between 1235 and 1270, is an aisleless building of cruciform plan, having a central tower and terminating at the west end in a massive residential tower house.

=== Hall of the Vicars Choral ===
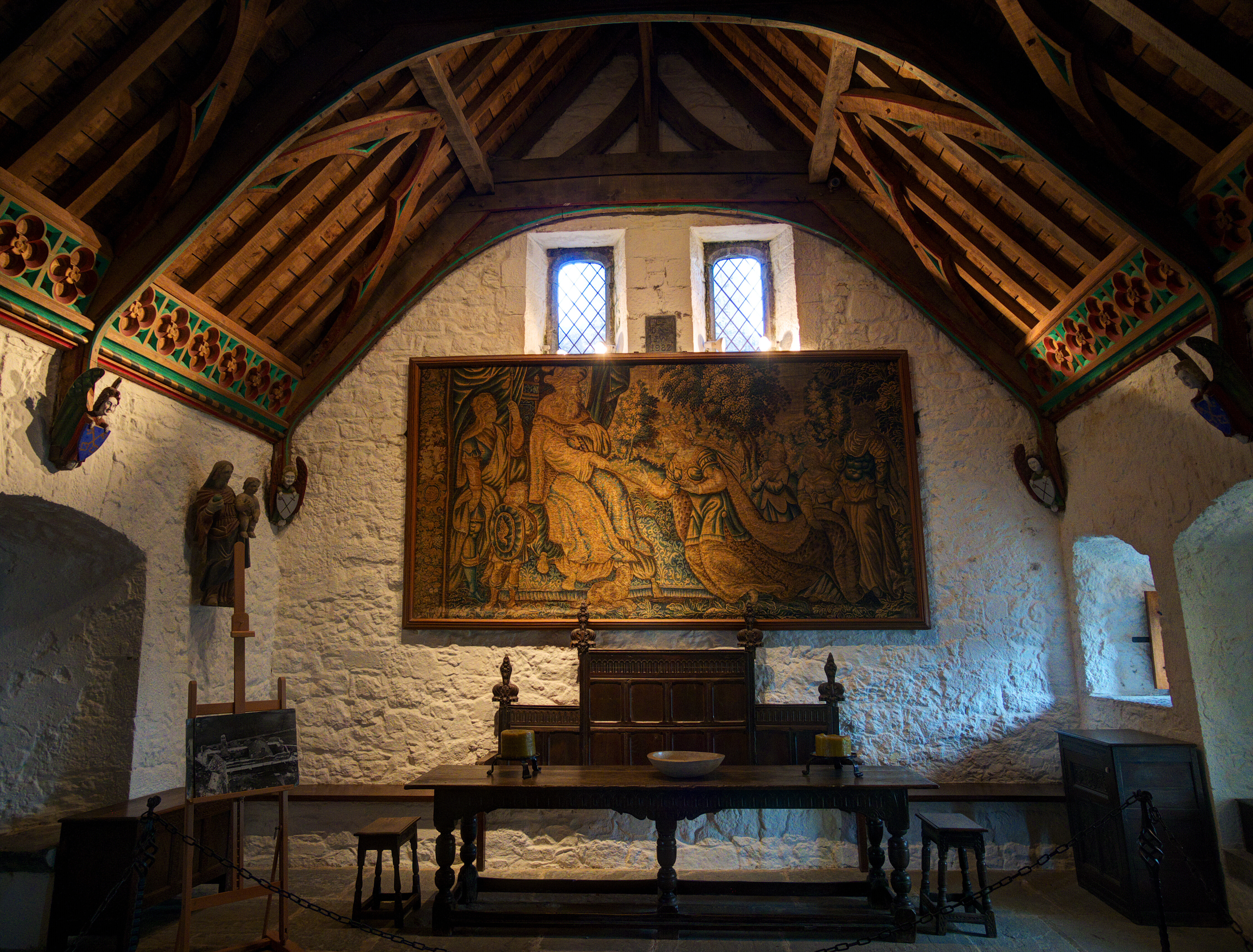
The Hall of the Vicars Choral inside the Cathedral

The Hall of the Vicars Choral was built in the 15th century and holds the over 7 foot high St. Patrick's Cross. The vicars choral were laymen (sometimes minor canons) appointed to assist in chanting the cathedral services. At Cashel, there were originally eight vicars choral with their own seal. This was later reduced to five honorary vicars choral who appointed singing-men as their deputies, a practice which continued until 1836. The restoration of the Hall was undertaken by the Office of Public Works as a project in connection with the European Architectural Heritage Year, 1975. Through it visitors now enter the site.

== Other features ==
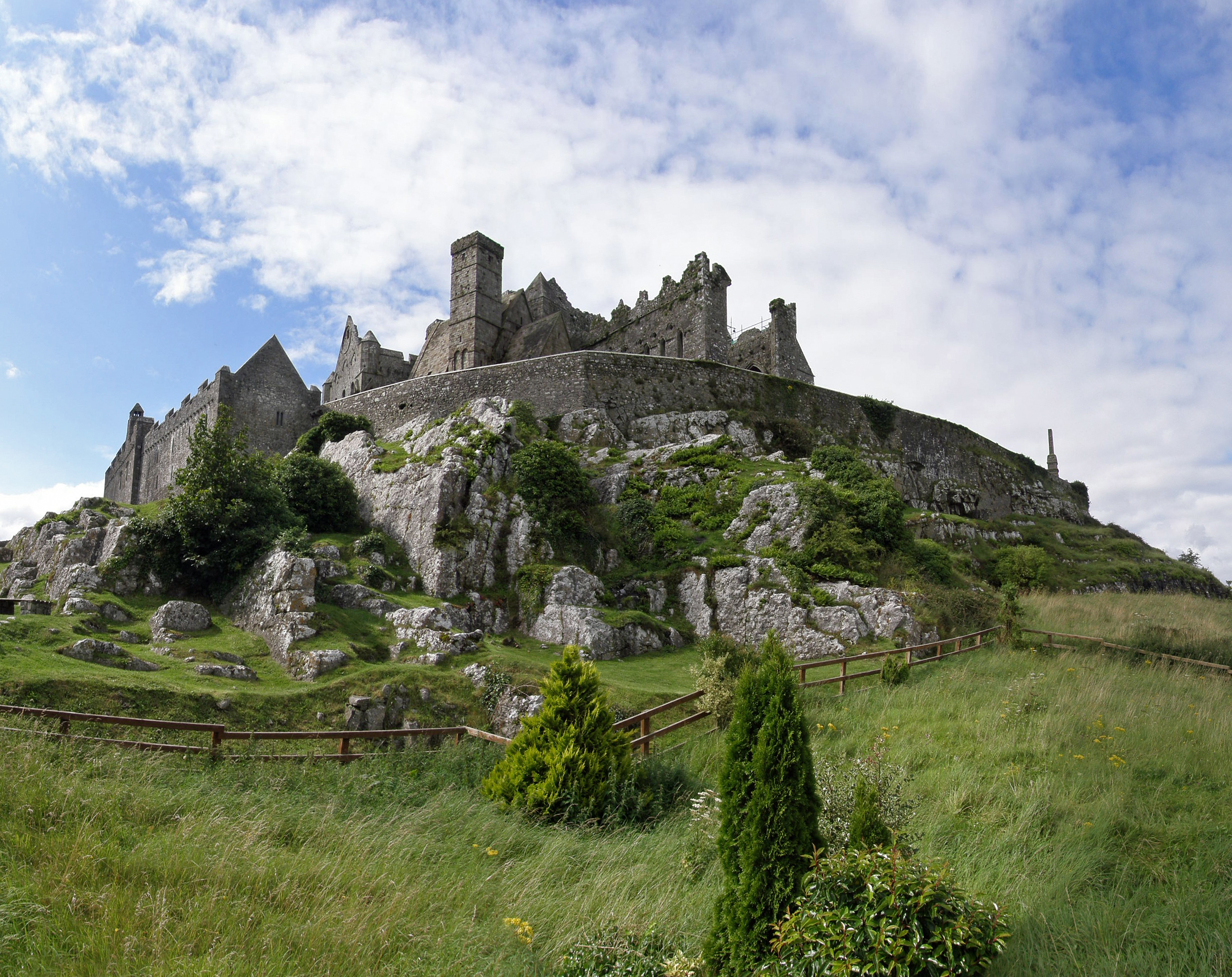
View of the site

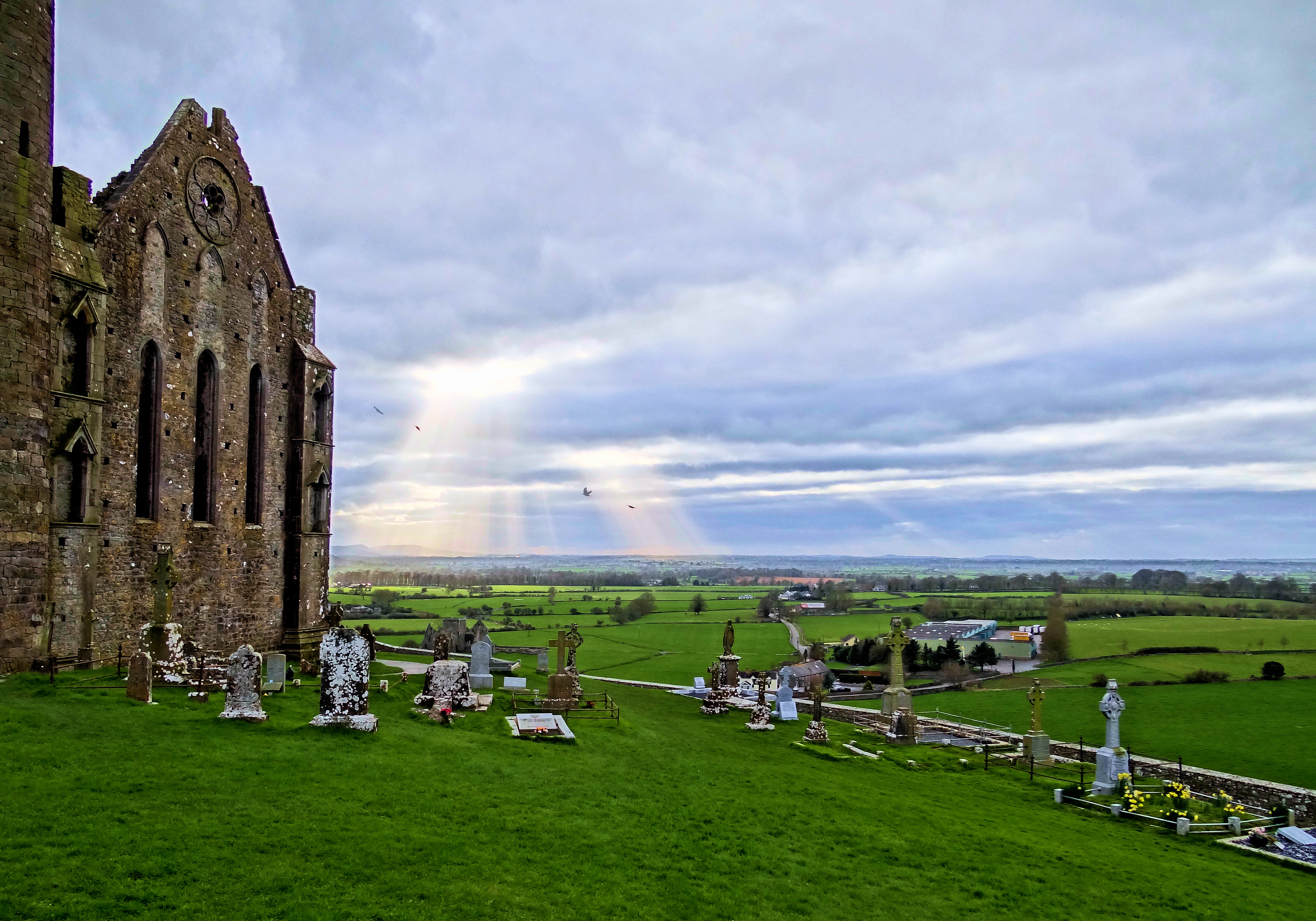
Graves on the northern side of the ruins

The entire plateau on which the buildings and graveyard lie is walled. In the grounds around the buildings an extensive graveyard includes a number of high crosses. Scully's Cross, one of the largest and most famous high crosses here, originally constructed in 1860 to commemorate the Scully family, was destroyed in 1976 when lightning struck a metal rod that ran the length of the cross. The remains of the top of the cross now lie at the base of the cross adjacent to the rock wall.

== Burials ==
- Malcolm Hamilton (archbishop)

== See also ==
- Eóganachta
- Hore Abbey
- Kings of Desmond
- Synod of Cashel
- National monuments of Ireland
