= Irish College in Toulouse =

Catholic seminary

Irish College Toulouse
- French: Collège des Irlandais, Toulouse
- Type: Seminary
- Active: 1618–1793
- Parent institution: Irish College in Bordeaux
- Religious affiliation: Roman Catholic
- Academic affiliations: University of Toulouse

Irish College in Toulouse (1618-1793), was a seminary that trained priests while the Penal Laws prevented the training of priests in Ireland.

== History ==
It was established in 1618 and given royal assent as 'le séminaire royal de Sainte Anne' in 1659. In 1660 it was formally linked to the University of Toulouse. As it was in his Diocese, the College was under the jurisdiction of the Archbishop of Toulouse, who visited the college in 1669. The Irish College in Toulouse, was a sister college of the Irish College in Bordeaux. Like Bordeaux it was supported by Anne of Austria, it followed the Bordeaux statues until it was constituted with its own statues. It obtained its own fully separate statues from Archbishop Charles Antoine de La Roche-Aymon, sanctioned by Pope Benedict XIV in 1754. It was closed in 1793 like the other Irish Colleges in French-controlled areas, following the French Revolution. Its property was sold by the French Government, while later in 1805 the remaining interests were transferred to the Irish College in Paris.

== Notables ==
- Bishop John O'Brien, entered Toulouse in 1725, Bachelor of Divinity in 1733.
- Rev. Dr. Thady O'Brien, ordained 1703 in Toulouse, Regius Professor of Theology, University of Toulouse and Rector of the Irish College Toulouse 1706-1715.
- Rev. Prof. Francis O'Hea, Superior (1751-1771) and Professor of Theology.
- Nicholas Madgett, adventurer, translator, licence and doctorat from Toulouse in 1764, ordained 1767, left priesthood following French Revolution.
- Bishop Francis Moylan, studied theology in the Irish College Toulouse.
- Bishop Charles Tuohy, studied in Toulouse before moving to Paris. Became Bishop of Limerick from 1814 to 1824.
