= Francis Lavalin Nugent =

Irish priest (1569–1635)

Francis Nugent (1569 – 1635 at Charleville, France) was an Irish priest of the Franciscan Capuchin Order. He was the founder of the Irish and Rhenish Provinces of the Order.

== Life ==
Lavalin Nugent was born in Walshestown near Mullingar, Co. Westmeath. He was the son of Edward Nugent, of the Dysert family, and Margaret O'Connor, the daughter of the "Great O'Connor Offaly". His aunt Katherine Nugent Cusack was the mother of Christopher Cusack, founder of the Irish Colleges at Douai and Lille. In 1582, Lavalin Nugent was sent to France to receive an education which the Penal Laws denied him at home.

Before the age of twenty, Nugent obtained the degree of doctor at the Universities of Paris and Louvain; and he occupied chairs in these two centres of learning, prior to his entrance into religion. He acquired a knowledge of Greek and Hebrew, and could speak a number of European languages fluently, including Flemish.

In 1589 he joined the Capuchin Flandro-Belgian Province, taking the name of "Francis". In October 1592, he was professed, and the following year sent to the friary at Lille. Towards the close of 1594, or the beginning of 1595 he was sent to France where the French Capuchin provinces were being formed and established communities at Metz and Charleville. Meanwhile, he continued to deliver lectures in philosophy and theology in Paris. He was ordained at Mons in 1595 and appointed custos of the friary at Béthune. In 1596 he went as custos-general of France to the general chapter at Rome, and was appointed commissary general of the Capuchins at Venice. Three years later, being again in Rome he took part in a public disputation in theology at which Pope Clement VIII presided. Nugent maintained his thesis with skill and eloquence and was awarded the palm of victory.

In 1598, he returned to Belgium, and was named guardian of the friary at Alençon. In 1603 he lectured on theology at Chartres, and later at Angers. In 1604, he became professor of theology at the Capuchin house of study in Paris. In 1605, he returned to the Low Countries, where he held a number of important positions. He worked to create a Capuchin mission in Ireland and in May 1608 secured a papal decree establishing a mission to England, Scotland, and Ireland. In 1610 he assisted in establishing an Irish College at Lille.

In 1610, at the request of Johann Schweikhard von Kronberg, Archbishop of Mainz, seven friars of the province were sent to establish the order in the Rhine country, and Nugent was appointed commissary general. He founded a convent at Paderborn in 1612, and two years later communities were settled at Essen, Münster, and Aachen. He also established the "Confraternity of the Passion]" at Cologne; amongst its first protectors were two friends, Antonio Albergati, the nuncio at Cologne, and Frederick of Hohenzollern, the dean of the cathedral.

In 1615, Nugent began a monastery at Mainz, and Pope Paul V nominated him vicar Apostolic and commissary general with full power to establish the Order in Ireland. Meanwhile, in 1618 the monastery of Charleville, in the Ardennes, became a training school for friars intended for the Irish mission, and facilities for the same purpose were offered by the Flandro-Belgian Province. A fresh band of workers was soon sent to Ireland and Nugent was thus enabled to found the first Capuchin house in Dublin in 1625. He then returned to Charleville and attended the Capuchin chapter in Rome.

In 1629, Thomas Fleming, Archbishop of Dublin, himself a member of the Order of Friars Minor, addressed to the Irish clergy a letter commending the Capuchin priests, specially mentioning "their learning, prudence, and earnestness". Two years later, Nugent founded a monastery at Slane, in the diocese of his friend, Dease, who had previously borne public testimony to the merits of the Capuchins.

Owing to failing health, he retired in 1631 to Charleville. He is generally credited with the foundation at Lille of an Irish College with his cousin Christopher Cusack (President-general of the Irish Colleges in the low countries) for the free education of poor youths from Leinster and Meath for the Irish clergy. He died at Charleville on the Feast of the Ascension, 1635.

Giovanni Battista Rinuccini described Nugent as "a man of most ardent zeal and most exemplary piety", and the annalists of the order state that he refused the Archbishopric of Armagh offered him by Pope Pius V, who styled him "the support of the Church and the light of the orthodox faith".

== Works ==
He wrote several works, of which the principal are:

- Tractatus De Hibernia
- Cursus philosophicus et theologicus
- De Meditatione et Conscientiæ examine
- Paradisus contemplantium
- Super regula Minorum, Expositio Copiosa
