= Martin Glynn (priest) =

Irish priest killed during French revolutionary reign of terror

Martin Glynn (10 November 1729 – 20 July 1794) was the last Rector of the Irish College in Bordeaux. He became one of the Irish Catholic Martyrs for continuing his priestly ministry in nonviolent resistance to the religious persecution of the Catholic Church in France during the Reign of Terror.

== Life ==
Glynn was born in the Diocese of Tuam. His native place was recorded as "Boffin" (probably Inishbofin in Connemara), and his parents were Denis Glynn and Honora Hosty. He was educated for the priesthood at the Irish Seminary and Jesuit College of Bordeaux. In 1753, he received a Master of Arts degree from the University of Bordeaux and was appointed superior of the Irish college in the city, in 1775. In 1780, Dr. Glynn covertly traveled around Ireland and Britain fundraising for the college.

== Martyrdom ==
Following the French Revolution, the college was sacked by a Jacobin mob and confiscated by the French First Republic. The seminarians returned to Ireland, but Glynn remained in Bourdeaux and, in nonviolent resistance to the Civil Constitution of the Clergy, secretly continued his priestly ministry without taking an oath renouncing allegiance to the Pope. In July 1794, he was arrested while offering Mass inside a private house and given a perfunctory trial. The judgment was " as Glynn, the non-conforming priest, has tried to escape the law of deportation, and must be ranked as an aristocrat and enemy of the Revolution, it is ordered that the death sentence be carried out in his case."

He was guillotined at Bordeaux on 20 July 1794.

== See also ==
- Glynn (disambiguation)
