= Theobald Stapleton =

Irish Roman Catholic priest and martyr

Theobald Stapleton, (Irish: Teabóid Gálldubh) (1589 – 13 September 1647), was an Irish Roman Catholic priest and one of the creators of modern Irish language orthography. During the Cromwellian conquest of Ireland, Fr. Stapleton sought sanctuary inside St. Patrick's Cathedral upon the Rock of Cashel and was slain by the Protestant army of Lord Inchiquin during the Sack of Cashel. He was Beatified by Pope John Paul II as one of the 17 Irish Catholic Martyrs in 1992.

== Life ==
Theobald Stapleton was born in County Tipperary, Ireland. He was born into a family of mixed Old English and Gaelic Irish descent, as the son of John Stapleton and his wife Fionnuala (née Nic Conmara).

Little is known of his career, except that he was a priest living in Flanders. Fr. Stapleton was responsible for the establishment of the Irish College in Seville in 1612. In 1616, he was ordained to the priesthood in Madrid, where he offered his first Mass on 25 March 1616. He taught at the Irish College in Madrid in 1629.

In 1639, he published a catechism in Early Modern Irish to promote the use of the vernacular in Christian literature. It was the first Roman Catholic book in which the Irish language was printed in antiqua type. The book, published in Brussels, was called Catechismus seu doctrina christiana latino-hibernica or, in Irish, Cathcismus sen Adhon, an Teagasc Críostaí iar na foilsiú a Laidin & a Ngaoilaig.

Fr. Stapleton stated that during his missionary work in Ireland he became convinced of the need for a catechism in Irish for the proper religious instruction of the uneducated commons. He expressed a love for the vernacular Irish language and harshly criticised the Classical Gaelic literary language and Dán Díreach strict metre favored by both the Bardic elite and the Gaelic nobility of Ireland, which Fr. Stapleton accused of having ‘put it under great darkness and difficulty of words, writing it in contractions and mysterious words which are obscure and difficult to understand’ and accordingly bringing the Irish language into ‘contempt and disregard and learning other foreign languages’.

Stapleton's catechism was also the first notable attempt to simplify Irish spelling. He advocated and used a simplified and standardized spelling system to encourage literacy among the less educated. In Stapleton's system, silent letters in certain words were replaced, e.g., ⟨idhe⟩ in the word suidhe ('sitting') was replaced by ⟨í⟩ in suí (as in modern Irish). He also brought the spelling closer to the pronunciation, e.g. by replacing ⟨thbh⟩ as in uathbhás ('terror') by ⟨f⟩, giving uafás as in modern Irish. However, only authors of devotional literature adopted his spelling system and Classical Gaelic orthography remained in use until the 20th century.

== Death ==
On 27 September 1647, in the Sack of Cashel, during the Irish Confederate Wars Fr. Stapleton sought sanctuary inside St. Patrick's Cathedral upon the Rock of Cashel, County Tipperary, where he was captured by Parliamentarian soldiers under the command of Murrough O'Brien, 1st Earl of Inchiquin, and, with six other priests, he was put to death on the spot. He is said to have blessed his attackers with holy water moments before his death.

== Legacy ==
According to historian D.P. Conyngham, "It is impossible to estimate the number of Catholics slain the ten years from 1642 to 1652. Three Bishops and more than 300 priests were put to death for their faith. Thousands of men, women, and children were sold as slaves for the West Indies; Sir W. Petty mentions that 6,000 boys and women were thus sold. A letter written in 1656, quoted by Lingard, puts the number at 60,000; as late as 1666 there were 12,000 Irish slaves scattered among the West Indian islands. Forty thousand Irish fled to the Continent, and 20,000 took shelter in the Hebrides or other Scottish islands. In 1641, the population of Ireland was 1,466,000, of whom 1,240,000 were Catholics. In 1659 the population was reduced to 500,091, so that very nearly 1,000,000 must have perished or been driven into exile in the space of eighteen years. In comparison with the population of both periods, this was even worse than the famine extermination of our own days."

Due to his martyrdom, Pope John Paul II declared him Venerable in 1991 and in 1992 Beatified him, making him Blessed Theobald Stapleton.

== Sources and external links ==
- Ryan-Hackett, Rita. 1995. The Stapletons of Drom, alias Font-Forte, Co. Tipperary. Killiney: Thornvale.
- Theobald Stapleton at the Catholic Encyclopedia
- St. John D. Seymour: The Storming of the Rock of Cashel by Lord Inchiquin in 1647.English Historical Review, Vol. 32, No. 127 (July, 1917)
- Araltas.com
- Simplified Spelling System
- Franciscans in Cashel and Emly
- The Spiritual Rose ed. Malachy McKenna
