= The Secret Seven (Frank Richards) =

Series of stories by Frank Richards

- The Secret Seven! – front cover of The Magnet, 3 November 1934
- A Tyrant Rules Greyfriars! The High Hand! The Greyfriars Storm-Troops! The Secret of the Vaults! The Secret Seven! Fooled on the Fifth! The Dictator of Greyfriars! The Brotherhood of Justice! A Traitor in the Camp! The Schoolboy Sleuth! Putting Paid to Prout!
- Author: Charles Hamilton, writing as Frank Richards
- Illustrator: Charles Henry Chapman and Leonard Shields
- Language: English
- Genre: Children's literature, School story
- Publisher: Amalgamated Press
- Published in English: 1934
- No. of books: 11
- Preceded by: "Bunter the Billionaire" series
- Followed by: "Christmas at Hilton Hall" series

The Secret Seven series is an 11 part series of stories published in The Magnet magazine in 1934. The author was prolific writer Charles Hamilton, writing under the pen name Frank Richards. The series was republished by the Howard Baker (Greyfriars Press) as two volumes of Magnet facsimile editions in 1976.

The stories are set in the fictional Greyfriars School. Venerable and respected Headmaster Dr. Locke, along with popular Head Prefect George Wingate and several other senior prefects, are all hospitalised after a road accident. Portly and pompous Fifth Form master Mr Prout is appointed as temporary Headmaster. He in turn appoints the bullying Gerald Loder as temporary Head Prefect. A tyrannical regime ensues, with unjust and brutal punishments raining down across the school.

The junior schoolboys respond by forming a secret society, the Secret Seven, to fight back against Loder and Prout. Despite its name, there are many more than seven members of the society – the name "Secret Seven" is designed to mislead the authorities and divert suspicion from the ringleaders.

A series of lively adventures follow before the Secret Seven finally triumph over Loder and Prout.

== Origins ==
The Greyfriars School stories were written by author Charles Hamilton, under the pen name Frank Richards, over a 53-year period from 1908 until his death on Christmas Eve 1961. During this time, it is estimated that he was responsible for the equivalent of over 1,000 full-length novels, which ranks him as one of the most prolific published authors of all time. From 1908 until early 1940, he was responsible for almost all of the content of the weekly children's publications The Magnet and The Gem, featuring school stories at the fictional Greyfriars and St Jim's Schools.

The Secret Seven was an 11 part series published in The Magnet in 1934. In 1976, the series was republished by the Howard Baker (Greyfriars Press) in two volumes of facsimiles of the original Magnet publications. The series is from what is considered by critics as the Magnet's "golden age", spanning 1930–1934, when Hamilton produced his finest work.

== Style and Themes ==
Hamilton's writing style has been compared with that of his contemporary P G Wodehouse. A light and distinctive prose style combines with a strong comedic element and a large ensemble of strongly drawn characters. The exceptional volume of material produced by Hamilton over his writing career allowed both characters and locations to be developed in great depth.

Hamilton's work has attracted criticism, most notably from George Orwell in a 1940 essay published in ‘’Horizon’’ magazine. Orwell described Hamilton's style as easily imitated (to facilitate substitute writers), plagiarist, and largely comprising shallow right wing content. Hamilton responded strongly to this criticism in an article published shortly afterwards, rebutting each of Orwell's points.

Other commentators have challenged the view that Hamilton's work can be narrowly categorised as right wing, drawing attention to examples of his output that demonstrate strong independent views. Over the years, Hamilton was ever ready to air unfashionable causes to his young audience, but did so in a way that did not attract controversy or jeopardise publication of his stories. Anti-capitalism, early Socialism, the Suffragette movement and conscientious objectors during World War I all received sympathetic treatment in Hamilton's work. In an age when the word "nigger" was not yet regarded in the same pejorative sense that applies today, Hamilton's work consistently emphasised the offensive nature of the term from as early as 1922; and his output even included unfashionable anti-British sentiments in stories set against the background of imperial India.

Resistance against oppression and injustice is a recurring theme in Hamilton's plotlines. Series such the High Oaks Rebellion series (1928), the Brander as Headmaster series (1930), the Popper Island Rebellion series (1934) and the Tuckshop Rebellion series (1938) all involve violent rebellions following acts of injustice or brutality. The Secret Seven series is a noteworthy example of a storyline in this category. The character Herbert Vernon-Smith, who first proposes the idea of a secret society, makes the following observation:

If you’ve read any history, you know that wherever there is a tyrant, there’s a secret society up against him.

However, Hamilton also retains a keen sense of the absurd and uses his distinctive prose style to underline the comedic aspect of covert societies that have masked faces, secret passwords, rituals and codes. In this excerpt, members of the Secret Seven have apprehended the bullying Loder but do not seem to be taking matters too seriously:

"Guilty or not guilty?"
Loder gurgled.
"Not guilty!" he gasped.
"That won’t do!" said the deep voice. "Only the guilty are punished by the mysterious brotherhood."
"Ha, ha, ha!"
"Shut up, you cackling asses! This is a serious matter."
The chuckle died away. Apparently some of the mysterious brothers were not taking the mysterious brotherhood very seriously. Perhaps it was rather too much like the films to be taken seriously. However, orderly silence was restored.
"Guilty or not guilty, Loder?"
"Not!" gasped Loder.
"Stick that pin in him!"
"Whoop!"

The author uses the character of Mr Prout, the temporary headmaster, to explore how power can be abused in the wrong hands. In earlier stories, Prout is portrayed as a harmless figure of fun, regarded with amused tolerance by the reader. Here, his character develops in an unpleasant direction that encourages the reader to take an active dislike to him.

== Main characters ==
=== The Remove ===
The Remove is the name of the Lower Fourth form, whose members are 14-15 years of age. The ringleaders and many of the members of the “Secret Seven” are to be found in this form. The Secret Seven society has many more than seven members, and is only so named to mislead the authorities.

Herbert Vernon-Smith, or “Smithy”, son of a millionaire stockbroker – a hard character with a strong rebellious streak, first proposes the idea of a secret society. He is a leading member of the society and is at the forefront of several of the stories, particularly the climax when he engineers Loder's downfall.

The "Famous Five", comprising Remove Captain Harry Wharton, along with Frank Nugent, Bob Cherry, Hurree Jamset Ram Singh and Johnny Bull are the other ringleaders of the Secret Seven. Other members include languid schoolboy earl Lord Mauleverer who features regularly, as does lawyer's son Peter Todd and Vernon-Smith's close friend Tom Redwing.

Probably the most famous character in the Greyfriars stories is the fat Owl of the Remove - greedy schoolboy Billy Bunter, who eventually (albeit reluctantly) also becomes a member of the Secret Seven.

=== Prefects ===
George Wingate is the regular Head Prefect and School Captain. Highly popular and respected, he appears briefly on the opening episode of the series before he is hospitalised in the same road accident that injures Dr. Locke. Senior prefects Patrick Gwynne and Tom North are also victims of the accident.

Gerald Loder is the bullying prefect who replaces Wingate as Head Prefect and School Captain. He is a central character in this series. Arthur Carne and James Walker are also prefects and are among Loder's few supporters.

=== Schoolmasters ===
The regular Headmaster is the venerable and respected Dr. Locke. He is hospitalised for most of the series. The portly and pompous Paul Pontifex Prout, master of the Fifth Form, is appointed as temporary Headmaster in Dr. Locke's absence.

Remove Master Henry Samuel Quelch, is a close friend and confidante of Dr. Locke. He has little time for Mr. Prout and is not prepared to treat him as anything other than a temporary Headmaster. Relations between the two deteriorate to the point that Quelch decides to leave the school until Dr. Locke's return.

Mr. Woose is appointed as temporary Remove master. Absent minded and ineffectual, Woose is cowed by Prout and Loder. Other masters include the acid-tempered Mr. Hacker, master of the Shell (Upper Fourth) form, Mr Twigg, master of the Second form, Mr Wiggins, master of the Third form, Mr. Capper, master of the Fourth form, Larry Lascelles, the young and popular games master and Monsieur Charpentier, the French master.

=== Others ===
Aside from the Remove form, other members of the Secret Seven are found in the Lower Fifth (Shell) and Fourth forms. Shell Captain James Hobson is a member, as are Claude Hoskins and Edward Stewart. In the Fourth form, members include Form Captain Cecil Reginald Temple, William Dabney, Edward Fry and James Scott.

The senior Fifth Form has no members in the Secret Seven, but several of its members feature prominently in the series. These include form Captain George Blundell, Fifth form duffer Horace Coker and Coker's friends George Potter and William Greene.

Cedric Hilton and Stephen Price are Fifth formers who are among Loder's cronies.

== Stories ==
=== A Tyrant Rules Greyfriars! ===
First published in The Magnet No. 1,390 - 6 October 1934

Greyfriars School is in a state of excitement in the lead-up to an important First Eleven soccer fixture with neighbouring Highcliffe School. School Captain and Head Prefect George Wingate has a heated argument with fellow prefect and school bully Gerald Loder after telling him that he will not be playing in the team.

In a savage temper, Loder vents his frustrations on Harry Wharton and Bob Cherry, members of the junior Remove form, who retaliate fiercely. A fight ensues, which is interrupted by Wingate. He threatens to bring the matter before the Headmaster. Faced with the threat of an inquiry that will expose his bullying character, Loder backs down.

This is the first of several successive incidents involving Loder. That night, he is locked out of the school while breaking bounds to meet his disreputable friends at the local Cross Keys inn. He is discovered by Wingate, who decides to report the incident to Dr. Locke, the Headmaster. The following day, Mr Quelch, the Remove Master, discovers Loder in the act of bullying several boys, and informs Loder that this matter will also be placed before the Headmaster. Loder realises that the cumulative effect of these reports is likely to lead, at the very least, to his removal as a prefect and possibly to his expulsion from the school.

Meanwhile, many of the school are preparing to follow the charabanc conveying the footballers to Highcliffe School and watch the match. Billy Bunter is one such – not through any interest in soccer, but because of the prospect of plentiful foodstuffs at high tea after the game. Without the knowledge of the owner, he borrows a bicycle, but in his hurry to leave the school, he omits to adjust the seat for his short height. As a result, he lurches dangerously from one side of the road to the other. The Headmaster's car, coming the opposite way, swerves out of Bunter's way and crashes into the charabanc carrying the footballers. Headmaster Dr. Locke, School Captain George Wingate, and prefects Gwynne and North all suffer serious injuries and are ferried to hospital.

This results in a sudden and dramatic change of fortune for Loder. The Fifth Form master, Mr Prout, is appointed as temporary Headmaster. Prout is a just man, but is pompous, self-important and susceptible to flattery – he is easily manipulated by the wily Loder. He promotes Loder to the position of Head Prefect. The rest of the school soon realises there are stormy waters ahead.

=== The High Hand! ===
First published in The Magnet No.1,391 13 October 1934

School bully Gerald Loder is now the Head Prefect of Greyfriars, under the temporary headmastership of Mr Prout. He loses no time in asserting his new-found authority by dispensing unjust and brutal punishments among the junior schoolboys. When Harry Wharton, captain of the Remove form, refuses to be caned by Loder, he only narrowly escapes being expelled through Remove Master Mr Quelch's intervention.

Meanwhile, the question of who is to be the new School Captain needs to be settled. The captain of the school is head of sports, and naturally Loder wants the position. But, unlike the Head Prefect, who is appointed by the Headmaster, the School Captain is traditionally elected by the schoolboys. Both Loder and Prout realise that Loder's chances of election are very slim.

In a comical interlude, Fifth Form duffer Horace Coker decides to stand for election. His election notice: “NOTIS! CAPTAIN’S ELEKTION! VOAT FOR COKER!” leads to unusually enthusiastic support around the school for his campaign – nearly all are agreed that they would rather support Coker than Loder. However, Prout orders Coker to stand down.

Throughout the story, tensions continue to build between Mr Prout and Mr Quelch. The Remove Master is under no illusions as to Loder's true character, but his attempts to protect the boys are seen by Prout as a challenge to his authority. After a final showdown between the two masters, Quelch decides to leave Greyfriars to await Dr Locke's return.

In the final chapter, Prout cancels the election and announces he has decided to appoint Loder as School Captain. The story ends with the school in a state of seething indignation.

=== The Greyfriars Storm-Troops! ===
First published in The Magnet No.1,392 - 20 October 1934

Gerald Loder, under the patronage of temporary headmaster Mr Prout, continues his brutal rule as temporary Head Prefect. Remove Master Mr Quelch has been replaced by mild-mannered and absent minded Mr Woose.

Loder interrupts a Remove football practice and finds a series of pretexts to order a number of the footballers off the field and to report to his study for punishment. Led by Vernon-Smith, and in a mutinous state, the juniors lock the door and proceed to wreck Loder's study. In the course of their exertions, they discover Loder's secret store of cigarettes and racing papers, which they gleefully hurl out of the window. An excited crowd of onlookers gathers outside, including Loder's anxious friends, Carne and Walker. When Loder himself eventually arrives on the scene, he is dragged through the window into the study. There, he is held down while Vernon-Smith administers a caning using Loder's own cane.

Eventually, Prout arrives. Realising that he dare not allow Prout inside and see evidence of his gambling and smoking, Loder allows the door to remain locked and tells a series of lies to Prout to persuade him that nothing is amiss. Loder is then forced to drop the whole affair.

A few days later, the new Remove master, Mr Woose, is late for morning classes. It transpires that Mr Woose's study door has been screwed shut by Vernon-Smith. Woose is released by Loder, who suspects that Smithy is responsible, but is unable to prove it. He reports the affair to Prout, who places the entire Remove in detention for the next half-holiday. This will prevent them from playing an important soccer fixture with Highcliffe School. Wharton appeals to Prout for leniency, but is told the punishment will only be lifted if the culprit confesses.

As the Remove sit in their Form Room, under Loder's supervision, Vernon-Smith confesses that he screwed up Woose's door. Loder however, merely notes his confession and refuses to rescind the detention. Wharton points out that Prout had offered to lift the detention if the culprit were to confess; but Loder is unmoved. At this, the Remove is moved once more to open rebellion. Led by Vernon-Smith and the Famous Five, they overpower Loder, bind and gag him. They then depart from the school. The Remove footballers play their soccer match with Highcliffe School, winning 3–2, with Smithy scoring the winning goal in the final minute.

Meanwhile, Prout has discovered Loder in the Remove form room. James Hobson of the Shell offers to use his pen knife to cut Loder loose – an offer that Loder eyes with well-founded apprehension as Hobson jabs him several times. Eventually, Loder is released. Prout now awaits the return of the Remove, in grim mood.

In the final chapter - titled The Execution! - Prout refuses to hear any excuses for the Remove's conduct and decides to flog the entire form in the presence of the rest of the school. Fortunately for the juniors, the overweight Prout is not quite equal to the physical exertion required, and visibly tires after flogging the six ringleaders. After flogging twenty boys, tragedy turns into comedy, with Prout barely flicking each offender, to the audible amusement of the onlookers. Bunter, who is last in line, is less fortunate – after a delay caused by Bunter pausing to adjust the exercise books he has packed into his trousers, Prout is reinvigorated and applies the final caning industriously.

At the finish, the school is subdued, with nobody wanting another flogging. But the turn of the Remove is coming.

=== The Secret of the Vaults! ===
First published in The Magnet No 1,393 - 27 October 1934

The story opens with James Hobson, captain of the Shell form, angrily confronting Loder after his close friend, Claude Hoskins, has been unjustly punished. After delivering a few home truths, Hobson punches Loder in the eye and knocks him down.

Belatedly considering the probable consequences of his action, Hobson decides to “lie low” for a while in the optimistic hope that matters will calm down. In an effort to help his friend, and inspired by the events in the previous story, Hoskins wrecks Loder's study in an effort to discover cigarettes and other incriminating material that can be used against Loder. He fails, and is locked in the school punishment room. Both Hoskins and Hobson are sentenced to expulsion from the school.

Hobson, meanwhile, remains in hiding in the school vaults. There, he observes that Loder and his friends are using the vaults at night as a secret vice and gambling den. The following day, he emerges from hiding and informs Loder of his discovery. Realising that Hobson's information would result in his disgrace and expulsion, Loder pleads for pardon with Prout on behalf of Hobson and Hoskins. To the general astonishment of the rest of the school, the punishments of expulsion are rescinded.

Later, after Loder arranges for the incriminating evidence in the vaults to be removed, he reverts to his bullying ways. He again interrupts a junior football match and seizes Hobson. When the other footballers object, a general scuffle ensues. Prout arrives and orders the footballers back to the school building, where he canes every member of both teams. Hobson and Hoskins are punished particularly severely – in Prout's eyes, they have displayed “black ingratitude” after Loder had pleaded for clemency on their behalf earlier in the day.

Vernon-Smith of the Remove now suggests that the juniors should form a secret society to fight back against Loder and Prout. He argues that history shows, wherever there is a tyrant, there emerges a secret society to fight back. His suggestion is that two individuals – each of similar size and build as Hobson and Hoskins – should “rag” Loder with their faces masked. Meanwhile, Hobson and Hoskins should ensure they have solid alibis for the time when the ragging occurs.

The plan is put into effect, with spectacular success. Vernon-Smith and Bob Cherry seize Loder as he is smoking in the cloisters. Both wear raincoats and have their faces covered with Guy Fawkes masks – but are heard to refer to each other as “Hoskins” and “Hobby”. Loder is gagged with a rotten apple and his hands and leg are tied, so that he is only able to hop. Finally his face is drenched in ink and a bottle of gum is emptied down his neck.

Loder hops to the school buildings, to general hilarity. He accuses Hobson and Hoskins of the assault, but it is proved beyond doubt that they were with their Form Master, Mr Hacker, at the time. Hacker admonishes Loder for being deluded by a “transparent trick” and tells him that he is “stupid, unthinking and unscrupulous in making accusations”. Prout, in turn, professes himself disappointed in Loder.

The story ends with the juniors celebrating their success. Smithy declares that “this is only the beginnin’!”

=== The Secret Seven! ===
First published in The Magnet No. 1,394 - 3 November 1934

In his position as head of sports, Loder selects a team for the next major soccer fixture, against St Jim's school. Loder uses the team selection to favour his cronies and pay off old grudges by excluding more talented footballers. Prominent among these is George Blundell, the popular Captain of the Fifth Form.

On learning that he has been dropped from the team, Blundell angrily confronts Loder. Blundell is provoked by Loder into uttering intemperate words, and Loder orders Blundell to bend over and receive a caning. There follows a violent scuffle, which ends with Loder, Carne and Walker being hurled across the room. Loder reports the incident to Prout, who summons Blundell to his study.

Meanwhile, Fifth form duffer Horace Coker is walking outside and observes a number of junior schoolboys heading towards the old tower adjacent to the school cloisters. Unable, as usual, to mind his own business, Coker investigates and stumbles upon what turns out to be a meeting of the Secret Seven. There are 14 members present. Half of them seize Coker, wrestle him to the ground, and sit on him.

Back to Loder, who has set off to find Blundell. He is apprehended by seven figures wearing Guy Fawkes masks and old coats, who place a bag over his head and drag him to a nearby classroom. There, he is told that he is in the hands of the Secret Seven of Greyfriars. The seven force him to write a note to Prout, admitting that he was “somewhat to blame in the dispute with Blundell” and begging Prout to let the matter drop. Loder strongly suspects that the seven are the Famous Five, Vernon-Smith and Redwing, all of whom he has punished earlier that day.

Loder's note is conveyed to Prout by Tupper, the school page. Soon after, Tupper meets one of the masked figures, from whom he receives a half crown tip. He assures the masked figure that he has no idea of his identity. (“ ‘Ow could I know who you was when your lordship's face is covered by that there mask? ‘Course I don't!”) Tupper is told by the masked figure where to find Loder, and duly releases him.

Loder immediately searches for the Famous Five, Vernon-Smith and Redwing, and orders them to Prout's study, telling them that they will be expelled for their offences. Protesting their innocence, the juniors comply. In Prout's study, they find Coker, who is complaining about the attack on him by seven juniors. Loder, unable to believe his luck, promptly jumps to the mistaken conclusion that Coker is a witness to the Secret Seven's actions. He describes the attack on himself to Prout and affirms that he recognised the voices of both Cherry and Vernon-Smith. But when Coker is called upon to corroborate Loder's story, he instead contradicts it, testifying that the seven accused juniors were sitting on him when the attack on Loder occurred. Prout accepts their innocence and allows them to leave. Before doing so, Vernon-Smith and Cherry pointedly draw attention to Loder's false statement that he recognised their voices, to Prout and Loder's discomfort.

A few days later, Loder is in his study contemplating the St Jim's match later that afternoon. By now he has dropped every player who was a friend of Wingate's, and replaced them with his own cronies. The door opens and seven masked figures rush in. They seize Loder, gag him and tie him to the study table. They then leave and lock the door.

Anxious at Loder's disappearance, his friends Carne and Walker start searching. Walker is directed to the games changing room, where he in turn is seized by seven masked figures, bound, gagged and locked in a cupboard. A similar fate befalls Carne, who is imprisoned in the Sixth Form room.

With three players missing, Sykes of the Sixth Form is reinstated as captain and promptly excludes the remainder of Loder's cronies. The footballers go on to win the St Jim's match.

Later that afternoon, Prout receives a telephone call in the Headmaster's study. The caller announces himself as “Brother No. 1 of the Secret Seven” and tells Prout where to find Loder, Carne and Walker. He proceeds to release each of them, and announces that the seven boys must be discovered immediately, and expelled from the school. He sternly informs Vernon-Smith that it is “no laughing matter!” But the rest of the school seems to disagree.

=== Fooled on the Fifth! ===
First published in The Magnet No. 1,395 - 10 November 1934

It is a few days before 5 November, Guy Fawkes Day. For reasons of safety, the school rules prohibit the possession of fireworks before the 5th, but this rule is frequently disregarded by unthinking schoolboys. The story opens with Bob Cherry attempting to smuggle a package of fireworks into the school, and being pursued by Loder. He manages to hand the package to Harry Wharton.

Loder catches up with Cherry inside the school building and promptly takes him to Prout, where he is searched. No fireworks are found. Meanwhile, Wharton finds himself cornered in the Sixth Form passage, where he seeks refuge in Loder's study. There, he hides the fireworks in Loder's fireplace, under the coals.

We now learn that Loder is short of cash – he has overrun his account at the school shop and has lost money gambling at the local inn. (This is the start of a sub plot that eventually leads to Loder's downfall.) Loder, who had invited his friends for tea, has no funds with which to buy provisions. He summons Vernon-Smith - whose millionaire father provides him with an over-generous allowance – and asks him to buy the provisions at the school shop, on the understanding that he will reimburse him the next day. Realising how matters stand, Smithy refuses, and receives a beating from Loder.

Loder now visits Lord Mauleverer's study. The schoolboy earl has invited a large number of his friends to a very well provisioned tea. Loder accuses Mauleverer of breaking school rules – referring to “disgusting and unhealthy gorging in a junior study” – and confiscates all the food, to the fury of the juniors. Billy Bunter, in particular, “almost wept!”

Loder and his cronies, Walker and Carne, settle down in Loder's study to consume the purloined foodstuffs. A fire has been lit in the fireplace – which soon ignites the hidden fireworks. Chaos quickly ensues, with the three prefects scrambling to avoid exploding fireworks and causing the table, laden with foodstuffs and drinks, to overturn. Clouds of soot are dislodged from the chimney. When the last firework is expended, the study looks like the scene of a volcanic eruption, with Loder looking like a demon in a pantomime.

Vernon-Smith is immediately suspected by Loder as being responsible, and is summoned to Prout's study. Prout realises that there is no evidence against Smithy, and refuses to act against him. However, he decides that all the fireworks in the school should be confiscated.

Vernon-Smith is ordered to remain in the study to prevent him warning his friends. He turns aside and draws a piece of paper from his pocket, on which he scribbles a few words, and then drops the paper out of the window. Loder sees his action. He calls to Wharton, who has picked up the paper, and Prout orders him to hand it over. But when Loder and Prout examine the paper, it turns out to be a list of Latin verbs. The paper is handed back to Wharton.

Wharton rushes back to his study, followed by the rest of the Famous Five. He holds the paper in front of the study fire. At this point, we learn that the Secret Seven have equipped themselves with invisible pencils, which can be used to write text that is only visible when the paper is warmed. (Note: invisible pencils were one of a number of detective-themed promotional gifts issued with the early issues of the Magnet in this series, and featured in several of the stories.) Sure enough, by warming the paper the juniors are able to read Vernon-Smith's warning that Prout is planning to confiscate all fireworks.

Pausing only to describe Prout as a “cheeky old ass”, the Famous Five swiftly pass on the warning to the rest of the school. By the time that Loder and the other prefects arrive at the woodshed where the fireworks were stored, they find it empty. As they make their way back to the main school buildings, they are pelted with lit fireworks from the darkness.

Loder eventually sees one of his assailants and grabs him. But other hands reach out and grab him in turn. He realises there are at least half a dozen pairs of hands. In fact, there are seven! Loder is bound and gagged. He is then placed on an old chair and dressed in an old coat and Guy Fawkes mask. He now appears to be, to all intents and purposes, a Guy Fawkes “guy”, and is paraded around the school. To Loder's horror, there are calls for the new “guy” to be placed on the bonfire. For a terrible moment, he wonders whether that might be his fate – until, to his relief, his captors turn away from the fire. They leave him, still bound and gagged, under Prout's study window.

Prout discovers the “guy” and removes the mask, revealing Loder's white and furious face. When Loder explains what happened, Prout roars at Loder, demanding to know why his Head Prefect had allowed himself to be covered in ridicule and treated with ignominy. Humiliated, Loder limps away.

=== The Dictator of Greyfriars! ===
First published in The Magnet No.1,396 - 17 November 1934

A thick November fog has descended on the school. Unable to contemplate football, the Famous Five learn that Loder is walking outside and decide to use the cover of the fog to find Loder and administer a well-earned beating. They duly find a burly figure in the fog and administer six strokes with a fives bat (a hardwood bat of similar size and shape to a tennis racket). Unfortunately for the Famous Five, the individual they found was Horace Coker of the Fifth Form and not Loder. To make matters worse, when they re-enter the school through Loder's study window, they are caught by Loder himself who administers a caning to each of them, with the threat of more to come when he discovers what they have been up to in the fog.

Loder does not have to wait long – when Coker returns inside, he complains at full volume at his treatment in the fog. Despite loathing Coker, Loder takes up the matter and reports it to Prout, who sentences the Famous Five to be flogged. To Coker's indignation, he is now accused by his schoolfellows of “sneaking” – an unforgivable offence among schoolboys. He is bundled unceremoniously out of the Fifth Forms games study by other Fifth Formers and is then rolled down the staircase by a crowd of Removites. Boiling with rage, Coker storms into Loder's study, roaring “You rotter! You worm!” - before realising, too late, that Loder is absent but that the study is occupied by Mr. Prout. Coker does not improve matters when he tries to explain that he intended his remarks for Loder. He is awarded a punishment of writing out 1,000 lines of Latin prose.

Coker continues to endure accusations of being a sneak from the rest of the school. After Coker is involved in a further scuffle the next day, Loder speaks to Blundell, Coker's Form Captain, telling him that he understands Coker is being maltreated for making a justifiable complaint, and that this behaviour needs to stop. In doing so, Loder, who dislikes Coker, is intentionally making matters worse for him by rekindling accusations of sneaking. “They'll slaughter Coker, Gerald old bean” murmurs Walker. “Dear me!” responds Loder. Coker duly receives another kicking from the Fifth Formers.

By now Coker is in a state of fury - and is concentrating on the sole object of making Loder suffer for his sins. He decides to kick a football hard at Loder on the games field. Knowing Coker's ability with a football, his friends Potter and Greene decide to give Coker a wide berth. Their caution is justified as Coker kicks the ball and lands it on the popular games master, Mr. Lascelles. This exploit earns Coker yet another kicking from other footballers.

With each of Coker's essays at punishing Loder having had a boomerang effect and rebounding on him, Coker is more determined than ever to deal out a decisive retribution. That night, he steals out of bed carrying a fives bat and makes his way to Loder's bedroom.

Unknown to Loder, the Secret Seven is also active that night – a small group comprising Temple, Dabney, Fry and Scott have already arrived in Loder's study and are awaiting his return from a nocturnal visit to the local inn. When Coker arrives, they seize him, believing him to be Loder. They tie and gag him, jam a waste paper basket on his head, and drape a sheet over him, before disappearing back to their dormitories.

Coker manages to partly free his legs and shuffle out of Loder's bedroom just as Loder and Carne return to the school from the inn. Upon entering through the Sixth Form lobby door, they see Coker's spectral form and depart in state of confusion and fright. They attempt to gain entry by tapping on Walker's window, but succeed only in rousing Prout. Now desperate, Loder and Carne re-enter through the Sixth Form lobby door and escape to their bedrooms.

Coker, meanwhile, has realised that Prout is awake and tries to find his way back to the Fifth Form dormitory. Finding a door that he calculates is the right one, he kicks at it repeatedly. It turns out to be the Remove dormitory. The Removites are roused and, knowing of the Secret Seven plans for the evening, immediately assume the strange figure is Loder. Prout arrives, and removes the waste paper basket, revealing Coker. In typical Prout style, he declares the situation to be “unparalleled” and marches Coker away.

There is general regret that Loder had escaped; but the juniors find ample entertainment that Coker has blundered in, yet again. Coker suffers a very painful interview with Mr. Prout the next morning, and gives up his feud with Loder. Besides, he now has a new object – to discover and deal with the fellow who had helmeted him with Loder's waste paper basket. Coker set all his wits to find that fellow. Fortunately for Temple, Coker's wits are not equal to the job.

=== The Brotherhood of Justice! ===
First published in The Magnet No. 1,397 - 24 November 1934

The Secret Seven seize Head Prefect Gerald Loder as he enters the Headmaster's study, and tie him to a chair. They then empty the inkpot over Loder's face and disappear out of the window.

Prout, meanwhile, is in Mr Woose's study. The telephone rings, and the caller asks to speak to Prout. He announces himself as “Brother No. 1 of the Secret Seven” and informs Prout of Loder's current state and whereabouts. Loder is eventually released after Walker manages to enter the study through the window.

A few days later, the Secret Seven assemble for a meeting in the Remove box room. Vernon-Smith is absent - with his usual independence, he is in Loder's study, writing a message for Loder on the wall mirror before joining the meeting.

The meeting, however, is interrupted by Billy Bunter, who has earlier hidden a cake in the room. Bunter finds the door locked and, alarmed at the possibility that someone else is devouring the cake, starts to bang and thump on the door, demanding to be let in. The noise attracts Loder to the scene. Realising that it is prudent to abandon the meeting, the Secret Seven members depart one by one through the window. Loder, looking through the keyhole, is in time to see the window quietly being closed.

Loder guesses correctly that he has spotted the Secret Seven meeting place. He proceeds to his study and says as much to Carne and Walker, who are waiting for him there. Loder tells them that he plans to keep watch on the box room and identify the members of the society. Vernon-Smith, meanwhile, has not had time to escape the study and is hiding under the table. He overhears Loder's words. Soon after, he is discovered by Loder, who realises that he must take steps to prevent Vernon-Smith from warning the other members of the Secret Seven. He takes Smithy to Prout and persuades him that Vernon-Smith should be locked in the punishment room for a few days.

Soon afterwards, Smithy starts dropping papers from the punishment room window. One is picked up by Loder, who takes it to Prout. They find that it contains a message written in code.

Prout declares he has no doubt of his ability to decode the cryptogram. Loder does not share his confidence, but keeps his doubts to himself. Prout's hapless efforts to decode the message are described in the chapter titled “Quite a Puzzle!”

Meanwhile, one of the messages is finally recovered by the Secret Seven. They recognise that the message has been enciphered using the Sheriff's Code (another promotional gift distributed with The Magnet). On decoding the message, they learn that Loder has discovered the location of the Secret Seven meeting place, and abandon the next meeting with just minutes to spare.

Loder spends a fruitless evening watching the Remove box room from an adjoining garret, before giving up. He now finds out that one of the encoded messages has likely found its way to the Secret Seven and, in a state of fury, sets off with his cane to beat Vernon-Smith in the punishment room. Anticipating his action, the Secret Seven seize Loder on the way and drag him to a disused room. There, they threaten to shave off all his hair unless he telephones Prout and requests Smithy's release. Choking with rage, Loder agrees.

=== A Traitor in the Camp! ===
First published in The Magnet No. 1,398 - 3 November 1934

Nine Remove juniors – the Famous Five, Vernon-Smith, Tom Redwing, Peter Todd and Lord Mauleverer – are settling down to high tea in Smithy's study when Billy Bunter arrives with a message from Loder. He informs the juniors that they are all summoned to Loder's study.

Loder is smoking in his study with Carne and Walker when the nine arrive, and has no knowledge of the message. Irritated at the unexpected interruption, he canes all the juniors except Mauleverer for impertinence. Loder tells Mauleverer that he can depart, as he is not such a “cheeky sweep” as the rest. Mauleverer thanks Loder, but politely tells him he is making a mistake – he is just as cheeky as the rest, if it is cheek to consider Loder to be “a bully and a brute and a rotter and a worm, and other things like that.” Even Carne and Walker are moved to chuckle as Loder snarls at Mauleverer to bend over.

On their return to Vernon-Smith's study, they find that Bunter, along with all the foodstuffs, is nowhere to be found. Furious, Vernon-Smith sets off to find Bunter. The others decide to summon a meeting of the Secret Seven to decide how to respond to Loder's latest act of brutality.

Bunter, meanwhile, is hiding in the woodshed, where he is busily consuming his plunder. But he is unexpectedly interrupted by the sight of Bob Cherry, followed by Nugent and Todd, heading towards the woodshed. Bunter conceals himself in a cupboard, from whence he watches in astonishment as more and more juniors arrive. Eventually, there are some two or three dozen persons present, from the Remove, Fourth and Shell forms. Intensely curious, Bunter listens in and discovers that this is a meeting of the Secret Seven society.

After a few minutes, Bunter is discovered by the juniors, who vigorously kick him out of the woodshed. Bunter flees back to the school, where he encounters Vernon-Smith, still determined to exact vengeance for the fat Owl's misdemeanours. To his horror, Smithy learns that Bunter has discovered the identities of the Secret Seven and is forced to leave the fat Owl unpunished. Bunter realises that a considerable power has been placed in his fat hands.

Matters soon become intolerable for members of the Secret Seven, as Bunter uses his newfound knowledge to prise loans and foodstuffs from members. At one point, he blurts out that he “knows all about the Secret Seven” in front of Mr. Woose – but Woose ignores him. Eventually Mauleverer suggests a solution – Bunter must be made to join the secret society and take a leading hand in handling Loder.

In the chapter titled “Brother Bunter!”, the fat Owl of the Remove is apprehended by the Secret Seven and, under threat of being jabbed by a pair of compasses, agrees to be initiated into the society. Having agreed, he explains that he now urgently needs to see a fellow in the common room, and Loder, and Woose, and Prout. But he is told that they will all have to wait. He is dressed in a Guy Fawkes mask and an old coat, and escorted to the Fifth form study used by Hilton and Price.

Loder, Hilton and Price have already been overpowered by other Secret Seven members, who had arrived in large numbers. Loder has begun to suspect that there are more than seven members of the society and now has proof of this. When Bunter and the others arrive, there are around twenty members of the society in the study. Bunter is now forced to administer a beating to Loder using Hilton's Malacca cane.

The next day, both Loder and Prout are in a state of fury. Prout's Head prefect has been publicly humiliated and Prout sees this as a slight on his own authority. Loder questions Bunter, knowing Bunter's reputation as an eavesdropper. He first attempts to bribe Bunter with foodstuffs and then proceeds to beat him – but Bunter, for once, has nothing to say. In desperation, Bunter hacks Loder's shin and escapes.

Price now makes a discovery – a slip of paper dropped by a junior on which is written “WOODSHED AT SEVEN”. He shows it to Loder, who immediately suspects that this refers to the Secret Seven's next meeting, and alerts Prout. Eager at the prospect of rounding up the Secret Seven at last, Prout decides to deal with the matter personally, and leads a group of prefects to the woodshed.

Loder is in no doubt that the Famous Five, among others, will be found in the woodshed, and is unaware that the five are at that moment watching the procession from a study window. They are in a state of excited anticipation at the possibility that Prout might enter the woodshed first.

Prout does indeed enter first and a crash, followed by a horrified gurgle, is heard. Loder's torch reveals the sight of Prout, streaming with tar, with a tar bucket perched on his head. Too late, the party realise they have walked into a booby trap. Prout forgets his dignity and rages at Loder, smacking his head. Loder, in his turn, returns to the school and thrashes Price. Meanwhile, the sound of merriment echoes around the Remove quarters.

=== The Schoolboy Sleuth! ===
First published in The Magnet No. 1,399 - 3 November 1934

A letter containing a ten-pound banknote arrives for Lord Mauleverer. It falls into Loder's hands, who insists that Mauleverer opens the letter in his presence. When the banknote is revealed, Loder declares that it exceeds the usual allowance for junior boys and that he will hand it to Prout for safe-keeping.

Meanwhile, Prout decides to act against the Remove, which he strongly suspects of harbouring the ringleaders of the Secret Seven. He visits them in their Form room and announces that the entire form will be detained on every half-holiday until the end of the term. Vernon-Smith and Wharton protest hotly that Prout has no right to punish the entire form on mere suspicion, and are both caned by Prout for their impudence.

Outraged, the juniors decide that it is now time for Prout to receive the same kind of treatment that the Secret Seven has previously reserved for Loder and his circle. That evening, as Prout enters his study and settles into his armchair, members of the Secret Seven emerge from various places of hiding. Before Prout is able to react, the open end of a coal sack is dragged over his head and drawn tight around him. His arms trapped, and unable to release himself, Prout staggers to the door and flounders along the passage to seek help. Astonished onlookers assume that a drunken coalman is playing a prank. Loder and the other prefects disdain from handling the filthy figure, but members of the Remove – possibly with some foreknowledge of who is really inside the sack – volunteer to barge the figure out of the school. It is only when the figure has been propelled as far as the school gates that Loder finally realises the truth and releases Prout.

Loder, who still owes money to disreputable characters at the local inn, is still in possession of Mauleverer's banknote, which he has no intention of passing to Prout. He plans to “borrow” the banknote to place a bet on a racehorse, “Gay Goldfish”, and use his winnings to repay his debts and replace the note. But his plans are frustrated by Billy Bunter, who is hoping to borrow some of the ten pounds himself, and who asks Prout whether Mauleverer could be permitted to have a small part of the remittance. Prout, who knows nothing of the matter, questions Loder, who is forced to hand over the banknote to the temporary headmaster. Loder is admonished by Prout for his apparent carelessness.

Vernon-Smith now plans to take further action against Prout. He makes his way to the Headmaster's study, intending to leave it in a parlous state. But, as he enters, he finds Loder, trying to force his way into a locked drawer in Prout's desk. A ghastly pallor sweeps over Loder's face, and for a moment he seems as if he is going to faint – but he swiftly recovers and inflicts a savage beating on Vernon-Smith. On his return to his study, Smithy confides to Redwing his suspicion that Loder was attempting to steal Mauleverer's banknote. Redwing, shocked, says the suggestion is impossible.

The Secret Seven continue to plan ways in which Prout can be made to feel sorry for himself without the need for him to be handled personally. That night, the Headmaster's study is visited by Peter Todd, who paints areas of the walls and various items of furniture in white paint.

Later that same night, Loder enters the study and breaks into Prout's desk, removing the banknote. Finding paint on his hands, he realises that the Secret Seven have been active, and considers that nothing could suit him better, as the secret society is certain to be blamed for the missing banknote. Indeed, Peter Todd is questioned by several juniors, including Vernon-Smith and 'three or four more.' The next day, Prout makes clear to Vernon-Smith that he suspects him of being the perpetrator – but is astonished when Smithy points out that the real culprit has left clues to his identity in the form of a thumbprint in the wet paint. Vernon-Smith takes photographs of the thumb print.

Vernon-Smith is convinced that Loder is the culprit and sees a chance to defeat Loder. But when he shares his thoughts with the Famous Five and Mauleverer, the others have grave doubts. They agree, however, that the matter must be settled one way or the other.

Loder is seized by the Secret Seven as he enters his study. The seven comprise the Famous Five, Vernon-Smith and Mauleverer. Vernon-Smith uses the “Sheriff's Thumb-Print Recorder” (another in the series of Magnet promotional gifts) to record Loder's thumb print and then compares it to the photographs taken in the Headmaster's study. They are identical.

The juniors no longer trouble to disguise their voices. They remove their masks. Vernon-Smith states that they will now go to Prout. Loder groans – it seems to be the finish for him.

Mauleverer now intervenes, and asks Loder: what was the big idea? Loder, crushed and beaten, sees a ray of hope and assures Mauleverer that he never meant to steal the banknote. He swears that he is not a thief. He only meant to borrow the banknote for a short time and then replace it. Mauleverer nods, and tells Loder that he had deluded himself: there is more than enough evidence for him to be expelled, convicted and imprisoned. Nevertheless, he accepts Loder's word that he only intended to borrow the note. Loder assures Mauleverer that he can recover the banknote; he admits everything and implores the juniors to give him a chance and not disgrace him. Even the hard Vernon-Smith is moved by the despairing surrender of their enemy.

In a final twist, the racehorse Gay Goldfish finishes seventh – leaving Loder relieved and grateful to the Secret Seven for their latest proceedings.

=== Putting Paid to Prout! ===
First published in The Magnet No. 1400 - 3 November 1934

Vernon-Smith and the Famous Five are complaining loudly at Prout's decision to impose detentions on the Remove for the rest of the term. A match with Rookwood School is due the following Wednesday and the Remove are faced with the prospect of cancelling this, and every other football match, for the remainder of the term.

Unknown to them, Prout is passing outside. He overhears himself being described as “that old ass, Prout”, “that terrific and ludicrous old fathead, Prout”, as “having a swelled head through fancying himself as headmaster”, and who “can't help being a fool”. Prout looks in through the window and splutters in indignation. While the other boys stammer their apologies, Vernon-Smith makes matters worse by coolly telling Prout that they never knew Prout was listening under the window. Prout canes all six boys.

The following Saturday morning, the Remove are sitting in their Form room, under detention. Loder is supervising, in a better humour than usual, but bored. He departs, leaving Wharton to keep order. Led by Vernon-Smith, the Removites promptly start a game of football using a cushion. Wharton protests, but is ignored. Attracted by the noise, Loder reappears. Unaware that the door has been designated as a goal, he is bowled over by a dusty cushion kicked onto his face by Vernon-Smith. When Loder attempts to administer punishment, a brisk struggle ensues, which culminates in Loder being ejected from the room.

The Remove now gloomily contemplate the consequences of their actions. They anticipate a tremendous row and punishments all round. Bunter anxiously reminds the others to mention that he had no part in the affair and is promptly kicked by Smithy. However, the following lessons pass without any sign of the anticipated punishments.

Later that day, Vernon-Smith visits the Famous Five in Wharton's study. He reminds them of episode of Mauleverer's stolen banknote, told in the previous story, and suggests this is the reason that Loder has not reported the morning's events. He still has the photographs of Loder's thumb print, and points out that Loder dare not make further trouble while it is in his possession. Smithy is now prepared to make further use of this evidence. His plan is to force Loder to beg the Remove off detention so they can play the Rookwood match.

Wharton and the others are deeply troubled. They had thought that the matter of the banknote was past history. Wharton tells Vernon-Smith that what he is suggesting is tantamount to blackmail. Smithy, though, is determined to have his way. He visits Loder in his study and threatens to expose him to Prout unless he succeeds in rescinding the detention.

When Mauleverer learns what Vernon-Smith is up to, he is outraged. He visits Vernon-Smith in his study, and asks him to destroy the thumb prints. Vernon-Smith refuses, with the result that the two don boxing gloves and start to fight. The Famous Five intervene and separate the two. Vernon-Smith is forced to drop the photographs into the fire.

The next morning, Wharton speaks to Loder and tells him the photographs are destroyed. Loder is giddy with relief. He assures Wharton that he has spoken to Prout, but that the temporary headmaster is as hard as iron on the subject. However, he tells Wharton he will try again. He does so, but to no avail. He receives a booming lecture from Prout that is heard far and wide from the open window. The surprised juniors, including Vernon-Smith, realise that there is a spark of decency in Loder.

Loder, however, is not ready to give up. He enlists Bunter's aid and uses the Fat Owl's gift for ventriloquism to trick Prout into leaving the school that afternoon. Loder then informs Wharton that the Remove has leave to go to Rookwood School and play the match. They duly win the game 3–2, with Vernon-Smith scoring the winning goal.

Upon their return, Prout has learned that Remove absented themselves from detention. He is awaiting their return with a brow of thunder. At the evening assembly in the School Hall, he calls Wharton to the front and informs him he will be expelled from the school. The rest of the form is to be flogged.

When the astounded Remove explain that Loder gave them leave, Prout gasps for words. He roars at Loder, telling him that he is no longer Head Prefect, and that he doubts Loder can remain a prefect at all. He admits that Wharton and the others had a "flimsy excuse" for their behaviour; so Wharton will not be expelled, but the entire form will still be flogged.

At this moment the doors of the Hall open to reveal Dr. Locke, the headmaster, who has recovered from his injuries. He is initially reluctant to intervene, but the Remove realise this is a chance too good to lose. Vernon-Smith and Wharton point out that the form had a prefect's leave from detention. When this is confirmed by Loder, Dr. Locke gently suggests that the juniors should not be punished. Prout, his face turning purple, now turns to Loder, accusing him of deliberately disobeying his instructions. Loder explains that he used his discretion in Prout's absence, given that a regular football fixture was involved. Dr. Locke nods and agrees this seems very reasonable. Perhaps Mr. Prout would think it best to let the matter drop?

Prout does not think it best, but has little choice but to agree. There are many smiling faces as the Greyfriars fellows march out of the Hall.

== See also ==
- The Magnet
