= History of the Church of England =

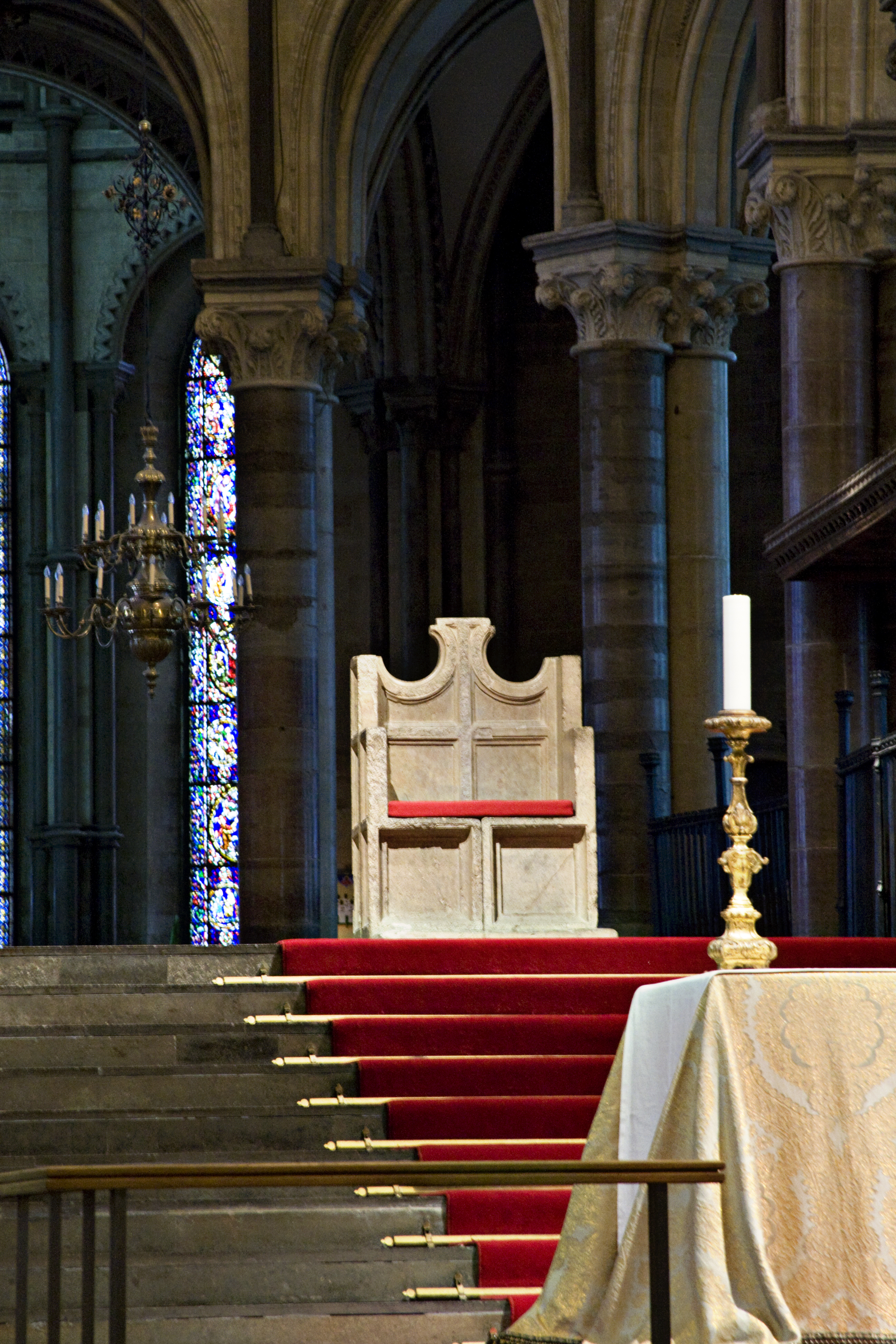
Chair of Saint Augustine, the archiepiscopal throne in Canterbury Cathedral, Kent (Note: The Chair of St Augustine is the seat of the archbishop of Canterbury and in his role as head of the Anglican Communion. Archbishops of Canterbury are enthroned twice: firstly as diocesan ordinary (and metropolitan and primate of the Church of England) in the archbishop's throne, by the archdeacon of Canterbury; and secondly as leader of the worldwide church in the Chair of St Augustine by the senior (by length of service) archbishop of the Anglican Communion. The stone chair is therefore of symbolic significance throughout Anglicanism.)

The Church of England claims that its history can be traced back to 597. Specifically, to the Gregorian mission led by Augustine of Canterbury at the behest of Pope Gregory I. This mission instigated the Christianisation of the Anglo-Saxons, and led to Augustine being created the first Archbishop of Canterbury by Gregory.

Following from the Gregorian mission, England was under the aegis of Chalcedonian Christianity throughout the Mediaeval Period. During the Great Schism of 1054, England retained its identity within the Catholic Church under the jurisdiction of the Pope.

However, the monarchs of England conflicted with the church in England over the amassing of legal privileges and property. Notably, the conflict between Saint Thomas Becket and Henry II over the rights of the church.

These conflicts came to a crescendo during the Henrician Reformation, wherein papal authority was abolished in England so that Henry VIII could get an annulment from Catherine of Aragon. Henry VIII had appointed himself Supreme Head of the Church of England. The resulting Act of Supremacy led to a spate of martyrdoms across England, notably Saint Thomas More and Saint John Fisher. Furthermore, monasteries were dissolved and church assets were stolen.

Subsequent reformations took place, as part of the wider English Reformation. The Edwardian Reformation oriented the nascent Church of England in a more Reformed Protestant direction during the brief reign of Edward VI (r. 1547–1553). The church was briefly restored to Catholicism during the reign of Mary I (r. 1553–1558), but the Elizabethan Reformation created a more permanent separation during the reign of Elizabeth I (r. 1558–1603). The Elizabethan Religious Settlement established the Church of England as a conservative Reformed Protestant church. During this time, the Book of Common Prayer was authorised as the church's official liturgy and the Thirty-nine Articles as a doctrinal statement. These continue to be important expressions of Anglicanism.

The Settlement failed to end religious disputes. While most of the population gradually conformed to the established church, a minority of recusants remained loyal Roman Catholics. Within the Church of England, Puritans pressed to remove what they considered papist abuses from the church's liturgy and to replace bishops with a presbyterian system in which all ministers were equal. After Elizabeth's death, the Puritans were challenged by a high church, Arminian party that gained power during the reign of Charles I (1625–1649). The English Civil War and overthrow of the monarchy allowed the Puritans to pursue their reform agenda and the dismantling of the Elizabethan Settlement. After the Restoration in 1660, Puritans were forced out of the Church of England. Anglicans started defining their church as a via media or middle way between the religious extremes of Lutheranism and Calvinism; Roman Catholicism and Protestantism; Arminianism and Calvinism; and high church and low church.

In the 1700s and 1800s, revival movements contributed to the rise of Evangelical Anglicanism. In the 19th century, the Oxford Movement gave rise to Anglo-Catholicism, a movement that emphasises the Church of England's Catholic heritage. As the British Empire grew, Anglican churches were established in other parts of the world. These churches consider the Church of England to be a mother church, and it maintains a leading role in the Anglican Communion.

For a general history of Christianity in England, see History of Christianity in Britain.

== Middle Ages ==
=== Anglo-Saxon period (597–1065) ===
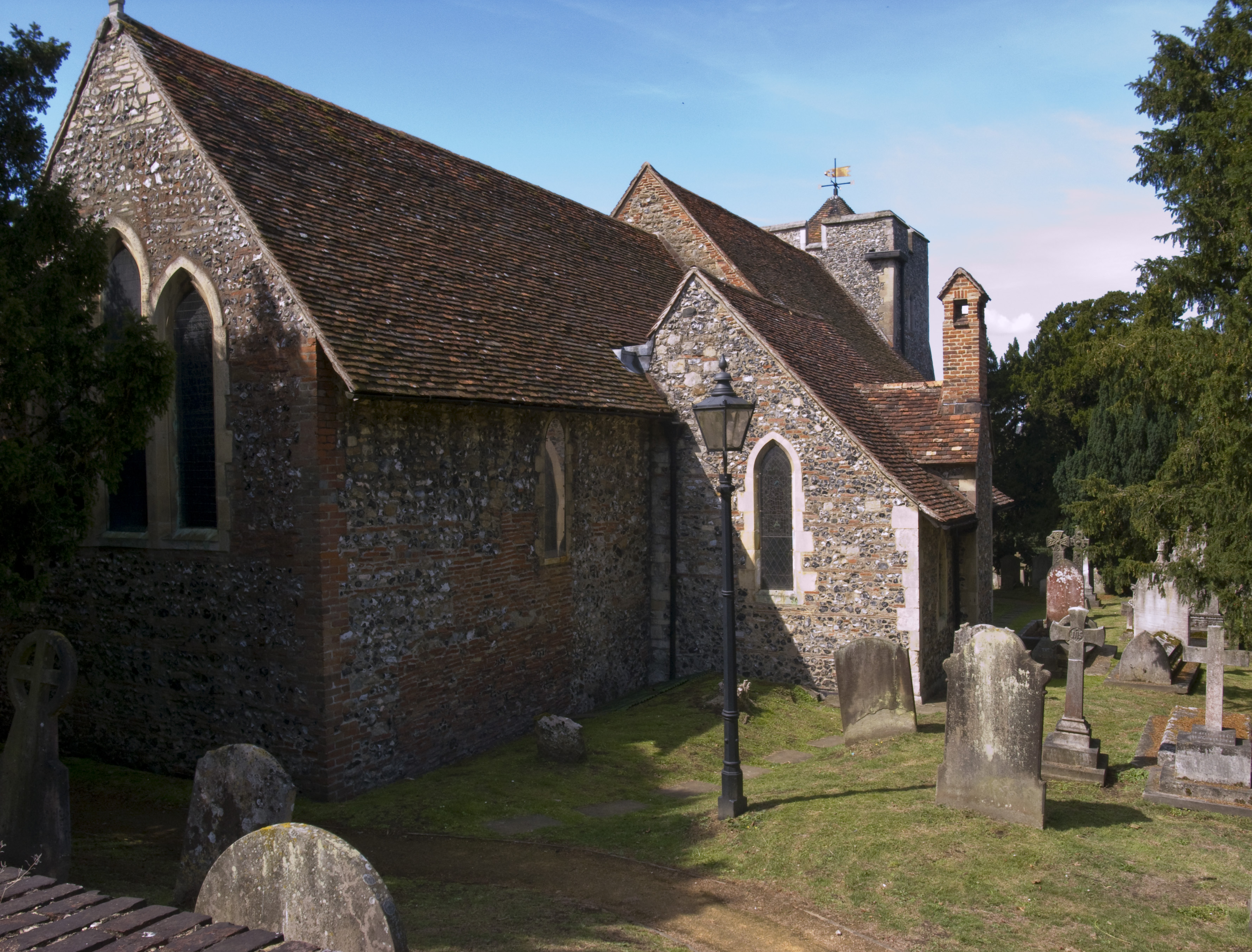
St Martin's Church, Canterbury, is the oldest English church building still in use and was the private chapel of Bertha of Kent, an important figure in the Christianization of Kent.

There is evidence for Christianity in Roman Britain as early as the 3rd century. After 380, Christianity was the official religion of the Roman Empire, and there was some sort of formal church organisation in Britain led by bishops. In the 5th century, the end of Roman rule and invasions by Germanic pagans led to the destruction of any formal church organisation in England. The new inhabitants, the Anglo-Saxons, introduced Anglo-Saxon paganism, and the Christian church was confined to Wales and Cornwall. In Ireland, Celtic Christianity continued to thrive.

The Christianisation of the Anglo-Saxons began in 597 when Pope Gregory I dispatched the Gregorian Mission to convert the Kingdom of Kent. The mission's leader, Augustine, became the first Archbishop of Canterbury. The conversion of northern England was aided by the Hiberno-Scottish mission, which promoted Celtic Christianity in contrast to the Latin Christianity of the Gregorian Mission.

The Celtic and Roman churches disagreed on several issues. The most important was the date of Easter. There were other differences over baptismal customs and the style of tonsure worn by monks. To settle the matter of which tradition Northumbria would follow, King Oswiu summoned the Synod of Whitby in 664. After hearing arguments from both sides, the king decided in favour of the Roman tradition, as this was followed by the successors of Saint Peter.

In the late 8th century, Viking raids had a devastating impact on the church in northern and eastern England. Monasteries and churches were raided for wealth in the form of golden crosses, altar plate, and jewels decorating relics and illuminated Bibles. Eventually, the raids turned into wars of conquest and the kingdoms of Northumbria, East Anglia, and parts of Mercia became the Danelaw, whose rulers were Scandinavian pagans. Alfred the Great of Wessex (r. 871–899) and his successors led the Anglo-Saxon resistance and reconquest, culminating in the formation of a single Kingdom of England.

==== Early organization ====
English dioceses between 950 and 1035

Under papal authority, the English church was divided into two ecclesiastical provinces, each led by a metropolitan or archbishop. In the south, the Province of Canterbury was led by the archbishop of Canterbury. It was originally to be based at London, but Augustine and his successors remained at Canterbury instead. In the north, the Province of York was led by the archbishop of York. Theoretically, neither archbishop had precedence over the other. In reality, the south was wealthier than the north, and the result was that Canterbury dominated.

In 668, Theodore of Tarsus became archbishop of Canterbury. He reformed many aspects of the church's administration. At the Synod of Hertford in 672, canons were adopted to promote greater uniformity, among these that the English bishops should hold an annual council at Clovesho.

A major reorganisation of the English church occurred the late 700s. King Offa of Mercia wanted his own kingdom to have an archbishop since the archbishop of Canterbury was also a great Kentish magnate. In 787, a council of the English church attended by two papal legates elevated the Diocese of Lichfield into an archbishopric. There were now three provinces in England: York, Lichfield and Canterbury. However, this arrangement was abandoned in 803, and Lichfield was reabsorbed into the Province of Canterbury.

Initially, the diocese was the only administrative unit in the Anglo-Saxon church. The bishop served the diocese from a cathedral town with the help of a group of priests known as the bishop's familia. These priests would baptise, teach and visit the remoter parts of the diocese. Familiae were placed in other important settlements, and these were called minsters. Most villages would have had a church by 1042, as the parish system developed as an outgrowth of manorialism. The parish church was a private church built and endowed by the lord of the manor, who retained the right to nominate the parish priest. The priest supported himself by farming his glebe and was also entitled to other support from parishioners. The most important was the tithe, the right to collect one-tenth of all produce from land or animals. Originally, the tithe was a voluntary gift, but the church successfully made it a compulsory tax by the 10th century.

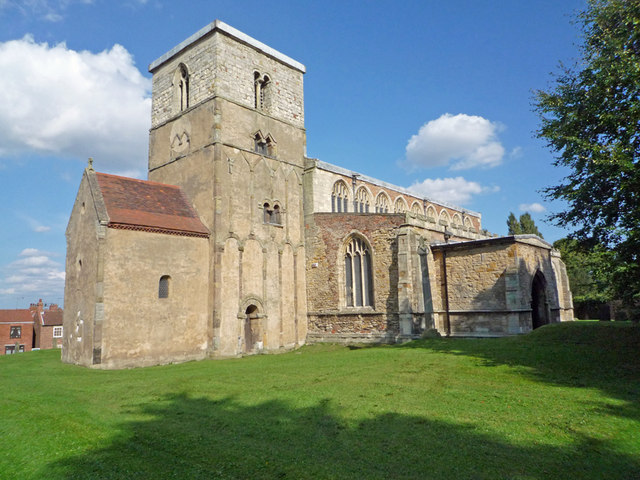
The square tower of St Peter's Church, Barton-upon-Humber (c. 990) is an example of late Anglo-Saxon church architecture

In the late 10th century, the Benedictine Reform movement helped to restore monasticism in England after the Viking attacks of the 9th century. The most prominent reformers were Archbishop Dunstan of Canterbury (959–988), Bishop Æthelwold of Winchester (963–984), and Archbishop Oswald of York (971–992). The reform movement was supported by King Edgar (r. 959–975). One result of the reforms was the creation of monastic cathedrals at Canterbury, Worcester, Winchester, and Sherborne. These were staffed by cloistered monks, while other cathedrals were staffed by secular clergy called canons. By 1066, there were over 45 monasteries in England, and monks were chosen as bishops more often than in other parts of western Europe.

By 1000, there were eighteen dioceses in England: Canterbury, Rochester, London, Winchester, Dorchester, Ramsbury, Sherborne, Selsey, Lichfield, Hereford, Worcester, Crediton, Cornwall, Elmham, Lindsey, Wells, York and Durham. To assist bishops in supervising the parishes and monasteries within their dioceses, the office of archdeacon was created. Once a year, the bishop would summon parish priests to the cathedral for a synod.

Royal authority and ecclesiastical authority were mutually reinforcing. Through the coronation ritual, the church invested the monarch with sacred authority. In return, the church expected royal protection. In addition, the church was a wealthy institution—owning 25–33% of all land according to the Domesday Book. This meant that bishops and abbots had the same status as secular magnates, and it was vital that king's appointed loyal men to these influential offices.

During the Anglo-Saxon period, kings were able to "govern the church largely unimpeded" by appointing bishops and abbots. Bishops were chosen by the king and tended to be recruited from among royal chaplains or monasteries. The bishop-elect was then presented at a synod where clerical approval was obtained and consecration followed. The appointment of an archbishop was more complicated and required approval from the pope. The archbishop of Canterbury had to travel to Rome to receive the pallium, his symbol of office. These visits to Rome and the payments that accompanied them (such as Peter's Pence) was a point of contention.

=== Post-Conquest (1066–1500) ===
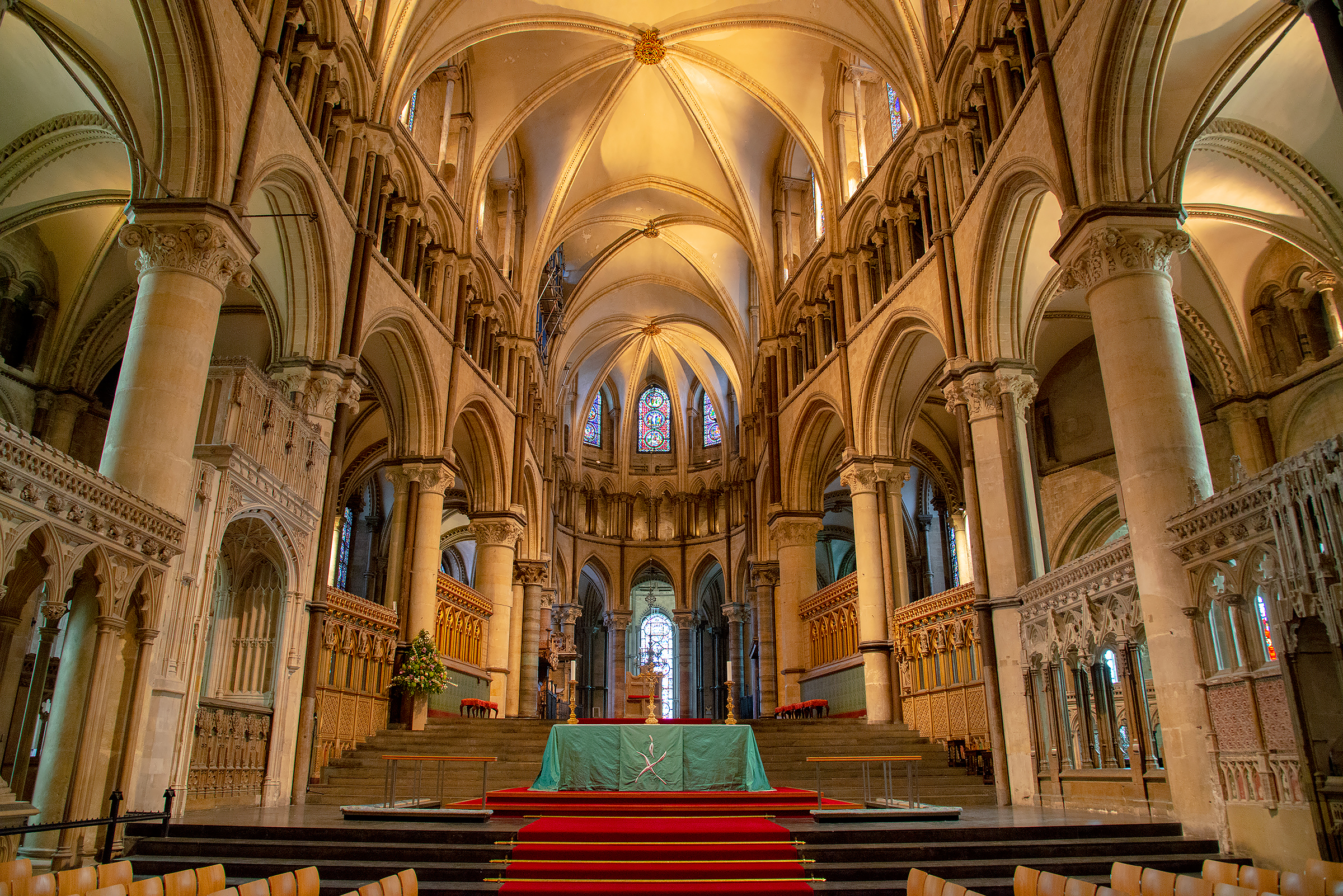
Founded in 597, Canterbury Cathedral was completely rebuilt between 1070 and 1077

In 1066, William, Duke of Normandy, invaded England claiming he was the rightful heir to Edward the Confessor. He appealed to Pope Alexander II who gave his blessing and ordered English clergy to submit to William's authority. At the time of the Norman Conquest, there were only 15 diocesan bishops in England, increased to 17 in the 12th century with the creation of the sees of Ely and Carlisle. This is far fewer than the numbers in France and Italy. A further four medieval dioceses in Wales came within the Province of Canterbury.

The Norman Conquest led to the replacement of the old Anglo-Saxon elite by a new ruling class of Anglo-Normans in both the secular nobility as well as the episcopate. In 1070, three papal legates arrived to oversee the reform of the English church. At a council held at Winchester, Archbishop Stigand of Canterbury, his brother Bishop Æthelmær of Elmham, and the married Bishop Leofwin of Lichfield were deprived of office. At a later council at Windsor, Bishop Æthelric of Selsey was also deprived of his office. Another bishop, Æthelwine of Durham, lost his see when he was declared an outlaw and imprisoned by the king. By the end of the year, there were only two Anglo-Saxon bishops left: Siward of Rochester and Saint Wulfstan of Worcester. Thereafter, William was able to fill the English sees with reformists such as Lanfranc of Bec for Canterbury and Thomas of Bayeux for York. He continued the English custom of recruiting bishops from the royal household and chapel.

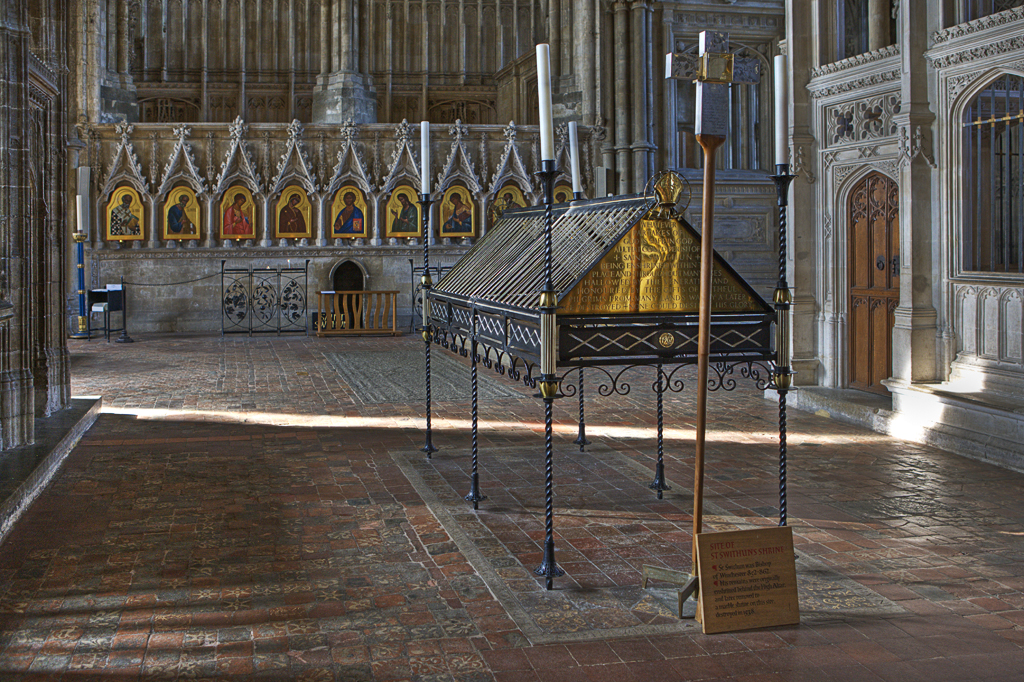
The shrine of St Swithun in Winchester Cathedral (in the background is Fedorev's iconostasis in the retroquire)

In 1072, William and his archbishop, Lanfranc, sought to complete the programme of reform begun by Archbishop Dunstan. Durham and Rochester cathedrals were refounded as Benedictine monasteries, the secular cathedral of Wells was moved to monastic Bath, while the secular cathedral of Lichfield was moved to Chester, and then to monastic Coventry. Norman bishops were seeking to establish an endowment income entirely separate from that of their cathedral body, and this was inherently more difficult in a monastic cathedral, where the bishop was also titular abbot. Hence, following Lanfranc's death in 1090, a number of bishops took advantage of the vacancy to obtain secular constitutions for their cathedrals – Lincoln, Sarum, Chichester, Exeter and Hereford; while the major urban cathedrals of London and York always remained secular. Furthermore, when the bishops' seats were transferred back from Coventry to Lichfield, and from Bath to Wells, these sees reverted to being secular. Bishops of monastic cathedrals, tended to find themselves embroiled in long-running legal disputes with their respective monastic bodies; and increasingly tended to reside elsewhere. The bishops of Ely and Winchester lived in London as did the archbishop of Canterbury. The bishops of Worcester generally lived in York, while the bishops of Carlisle lived at Melbourne in Derbyshire. Monastic governance of cathedrals continued in England, Scotland and Wales throughout the medieval period; whereas elsewhere in western Europe it was found only at Monreale in Sicily and Downpatrick in Ireland.

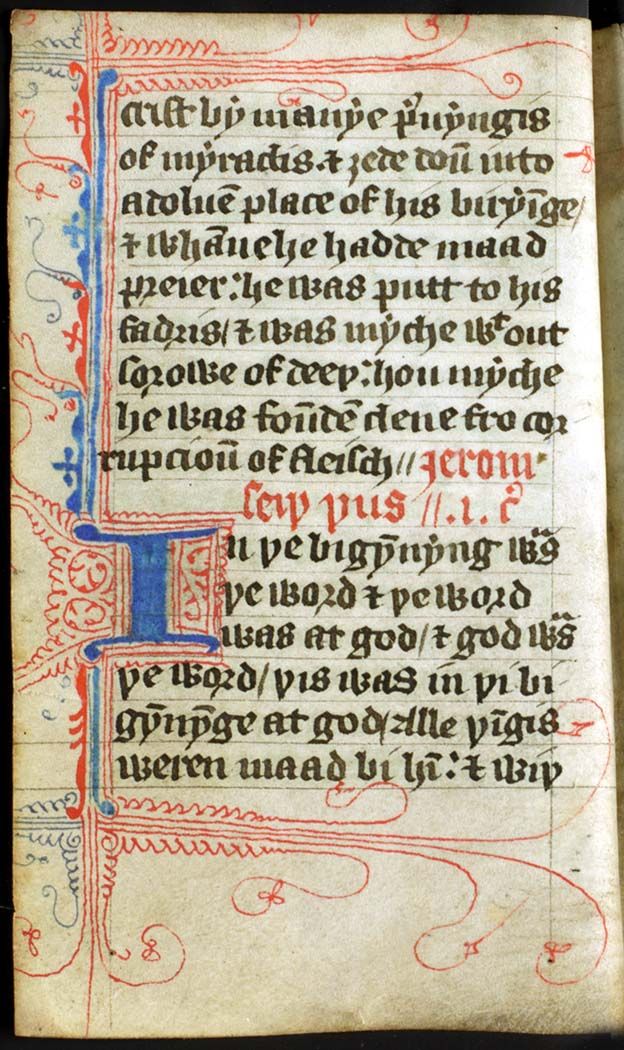
The beginning of the Gospel of John in a manuscript of Wycliffe's English translation (MS. Hunter 191) (first line: 'In þe bigynnyng was / þe word & þe word / was at god / & god was / þe word.')

As in other parts of medieval Europe, tension existed between the local monarch and the Pope about civil judicial authority over clerics, taxes and the wealth of the Church, and appointments of bishops, notably during the reigns of Henry II and John (see Investiture Controversy).

An important aspect in the practice of medieval Christianity was the veneration of saints, and the associated pilgrimages to places where the relics of a particular saint were interred and the saint's tradition honoured. The possession of the relics of a popular saint was a source of funds to the individual church as the faithful made donations and benefactions in the hope that they might receive spiritual aid, a blessing or a healing from the presence of the physical remains of the holy person. Among those churches to benefit in particular were: St. Alban's Abbey, which contained the relics of England's first Christian martyr; Ripon, with the shrine of its founder St. Wilfrid; Durham, which was built to house the body of Saints Cuthbert of Lindisfarne and Aidan; Ely, with the shrine of St. Etheldreda; Westminster Abbey, with the shrine of its founder St. Edward the Confessor; and Chichester, which held the honoured remains of St. Richard. All these saints brought pilgrims to their churches, but among them the most renowned was Thomas Becket, the late archbishop of Canterbury, who was assassinated by henchmen of King Henry II in 1170. As a place of pilgrimage Canterbury was, in the 13th century, second only to Santiago de Compostela.

John Wycliffe (about 1320 – 31 December 1384) was an English theologian and an early dissident against the Roman Catholic Church during the 14th century. He founded the Lollard movement, which opposed a number of practices of the church. He was also against papal encroachments on secular power. Wycliffe was associated with statements indicating that the Church of Rome is not the head of all churches, nor did St Peter have any more powers given to him than other disciples. These statements were related to his call for a reformation of its wealth, corruption and abuses. Wycliffe, an Oxford scholar, went so far as to state that "The Gospel by itself is a rule sufficient to rule the life of every Christian person on the earth, without any other rule." The Lollard movement continued with his pronouncements from pulpits even under the persecution that followed with Henry IV up to and including the early years of the reign of Henry VIII.

== Reformation (1509–1603) ==
=== Henry VIII (1509–1547) ===
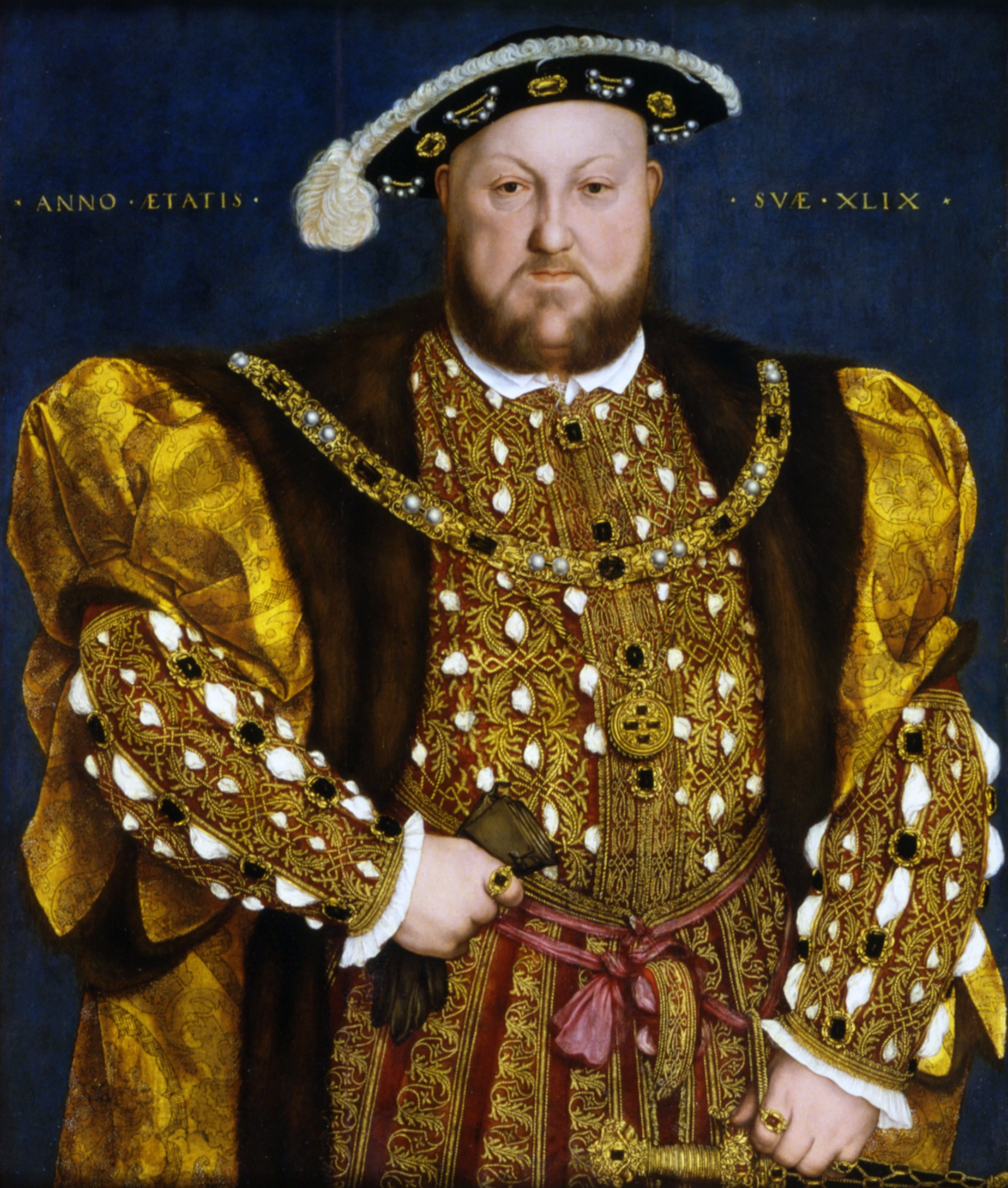
King Henry VIII was responsible for the Church of England's independence from the Roman Catholic Church (portrait of King Henry by Hans Holbein the Younger, 1540)

Catholicism taught that the contrite person could cooperate with God towards their salvation by performing good works (see synergism). God's grace was given through the seven sacraments—baptism, confirmation, marriage, ordination, anointing of the sick, penance and the Eucharist. The Eucharist was celebrated during the Mass, the central act of Catholic worship. In this service, a priest consecrated bread and wine to become the body and blood of Christ through transubstantiation. The Church taught that, in the name of the congregation, the priest offered to God the same sacrifice of Christ on the cross that provided atonement for the sins of humanity. The Mass was also an offering of prayer by which the living could help souls in purgatory. While penance removed the guilt attached to sin, Catholicism taught that a penalty still remained. It was believed that most people would end their lives with these penalties unsatisfied and would have to spend time in purgatory. Time in purgatory could be lessened through indulgences and prayers for the dead, which were made possible by the communion of saints.

In the late Middle Ages, Catholicism was an essential part of English life and culture. The 9,000 parishes covering all of England were overseen by a hierarchy of deaneries, archdeaconries, dioceses led by bishops, and ultimately the pope who presided over the Catholic Church from Rome.

This connection to Rome was severed during the reign of Henry VIII. Desperate for a male heir, the king sought papal consent to annul his marriage to Catharine of Aragon, freeing him to marry Anne Boleyn. When the pope refused his request, Henry launched a campaign to strip the papacy of any authority in England. Under intense pressure, the Convocation of Canterbury renounced its authority to make canon law without royal approval in the 1532 Submission of the Clergy. In 1533, Parliament passed the Act in Restraint of Appeals, barring legal cases from being appealed outside England. This allowed the archbishop of Canterbury to annul the marriage without reference to Rome. In November 1534, the Act of Supremacy formally abolished papal authority in England and declared Henry Supreme Head of the Church of England. The majority of English clergy were intimidated or bribed into acquiescing with the separation.

People supported the separation for different reasons. Important clergy, such as Bishop Stephen Gardiner, believed their loyalty belonged to the English king rather than a foreign pope. Christian humanists argued that papal supremacy was a recent historical development and was therefore not essential to the church's identity. The gentry and nobility wanted to diminish the power of the clergy. The king ordered the dissolution of the monasteries, confiscating the enormous wealth of these church institutions. Henry then granted or sold much of the land to laymen, ensuring these men would support the break with Rome out of financial interest.

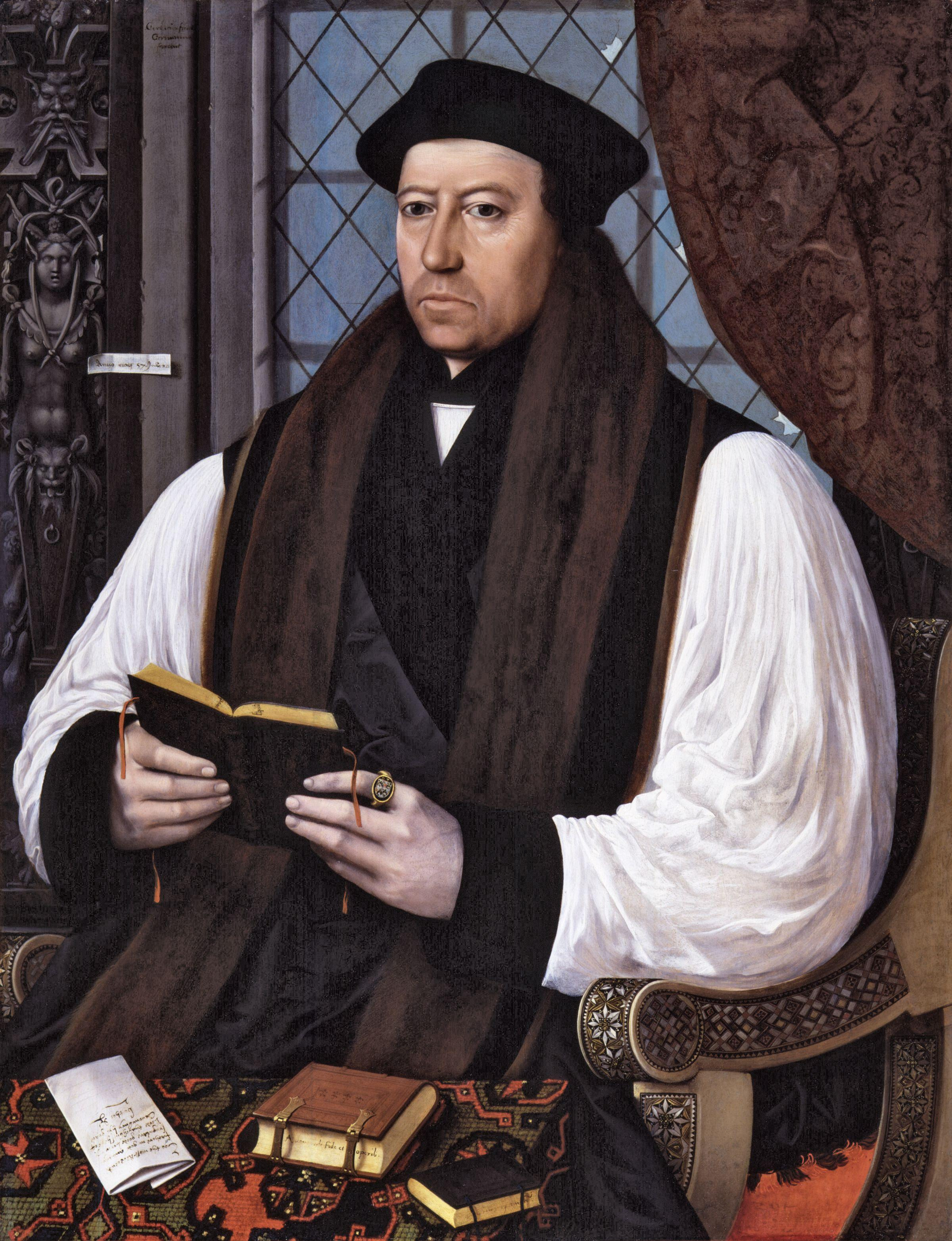
Thomas Cranmer (1489–1556), archbishop of Canterbury and principal compiler of the first two versions of the Book of Common Prayer

But the most important constituency backing royal supremacy were followers of a new movement—Protestantism. The Protestant Reformation was initiated by a German monk named Martin Luther. The main plank of Luther's theology was justification by faith alone rather than by good works. In this view, God's unmerited favour is the only way for humans to be justified—it cannot be achieved or earned by righteous living. In other words, justification is a gift from God received through faith. If Luther was correct, then the Mass, the sacraments, charitable acts, prayers to saints, prayers for the dead, pilgrimage, and the veneration of relics do not mediate divine favor. To believe they can would be superstition at best and idolatry at worst. Not only did purgatory lack any biblical basis according to Protestants, but the clergy were accused of using fear of purgatory to make money from prayers and Masses. Catholics countered that justification by faith alone was a "licence to sin".

Protestantism had made inroads in England from 1520 onwards, but Protestants had been a persecuted minority considered heretics by both church and state. By 1534, they were Henry's greatest allies. He even chose the Protestant Thomas Cranmer to be archbishop of Canterbury in 1533.

In 1536, the king first exercised his power to pronounce doctrine. That year, the Ten Articles became the first doctrinal statement of the Church of England. It kept most of the traditional Catholic doctrines and practices (purgatory, veneration of saints, and the real presence), but it also contained Lutheran teachings (justification by faith and three instead of seven sacraments). Under Thomas Cromwell, the King's vicegerent in spirituals, relics and images of saints were declared to be superstition. Between 1536 and 1538, iconoclasm was condoned by the government. By 1539, a traditionalist counterreaction began. Parliament passed the Six Articles, which reinforced the medieval heresy laws and silenced opposition to traditional doctrines such as transubstantiation.

=== Edward VI and Mary I (1547–1558) ===
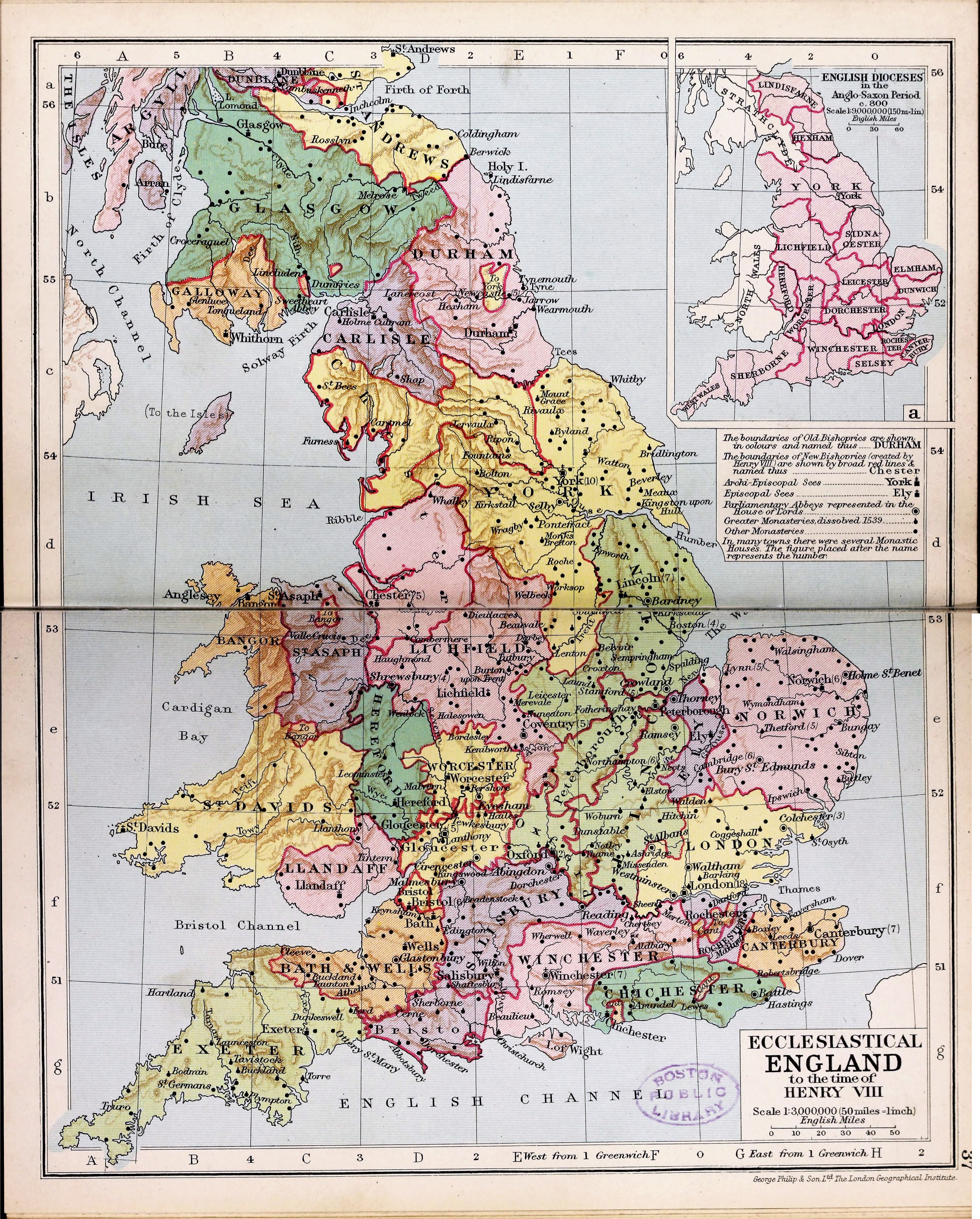
Map of English dioceses during the reign of Henry VIII. The cutout displays the boundaries of dioceses during the Anglo-Saxon period.

Henry's son, Edward VI (r. 1547–1553), became king at the age of nine. Under the guidance of Protestant councilors, including the Reformed theologian Thomas Cranmer, the Church of England was transformed into a fully Reformed Protestant Church. A Book of Homilies was published, from which all clergy were to preach on Sundays. The homilies condemned relics, images, rosary beads, holy water, palms, and other "papistical superstitions". It also taught justification by faith alone. Government sanctioned iconoclasm led to the destruction of images and relics. Stained glass, shrines, statues, and roods were defaced or destroyed. Church walls were whitewashed and covered with biblical texts condemning idolatry. The Chantries Act 1547 abolished the chantries and confiscated their assets. A chantry was an endowment that paid priests to say mass for the dead for the purpose of aiding souls in purgatory.

The most significant reform in Edward's reign was the adoption of an English liturgy to replace the old Latin rites. The doctrine of justification by faith is implicit throughout the 1549 Book of Common Prayer, but the Catholic doctrines of transubstantiation and the sacrifice of the Mass are rejected. Nevertheless, many reformers complained that the prayer book was too traditional. The 1552 Book of Common Prayer was explicitly Protestant, going so far as to deny transubstantiation. John Hooper refused to be consecrated a bishop while wearing the required vestments (a black chimere over a white rochet) igniting the first vestments controversy, which was essentially a conflict over whether the Church could require people to observe ceremonies that were neither necessary for salvation nor prohibited by scripture.

In June 1553, the Church promulgated a Protestant doctrinal statement, the Forty-Two Articles. It affirmed predestination and denied transubstantiation. However, three weeks later Edward was dead.

Following the death of Edward, his half-sister the Roman Catholic Mary I (r. 1553–1558) came to the throne. She reversed the religious policies of her father and brother and re-established unity with Rome. The Marian Persecutions of Protestants and dissenters took place at this time. The queen's image after the persecutions turned into that of an almost legendary tyrant called Bloody Mary. This perception was mainly due to the widespread publication of Foxe's Book of Martyrs after her death. Nigel Heard summarises the persecution thus: "It is now estimated that the 274 religious executions carried out during the last three years of Mary's reign exceeded the number recorded in any Catholic country on the continent in the same period."

=== Elizabeth I (1558–1603) ===
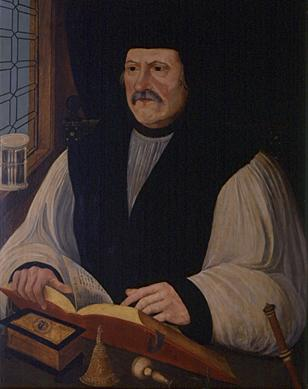
Matthew Parker, archbishop of Canterbury, 1559–1575

When Queen Mary died childless in November 1558, her half-sister became Queen Elizabeth I. The first task was to settle England's religious conflicts. The Elizabethan Religious Settlement established how the Church of England would worship and how it was to be governed. In essence, the Church was returned to where it stood in 1553 before Edward's death. The Act of Supremacy made the monarch the Church's supreme governor. The Act of Uniformity restored a slightly altered 1552 Book of Common Prayer.

Clergy faced fines and imprisonment for refusing to use the liturgy. As Roman Catholics, all the bishops except one refused to swear the Oath of Supremacy and were deprived of office. Recusants were Roman Catholics who refused to attend Church of England services as required by law. Recusancy was punishable by fines of £20 a month (fifty times an artisan's wage). "Church papists" were Roman Catholics who outwardly conformed to the established church while maintaining their Catholic faith in secret. Gradually, England was transformed into a Protestant country as the prayer book shaped Elizabethan religious life. By the end of Elizabeth's reign, most people were Protestants, and Roman Catholicism was "the faith of a small sect", largely confined to gentry households.

The Thirty-nine Articles were produced by the Convocation of 1563 as a revision of the Forty-two Articles issued before Edward's death. The Queen vetoed Article 29, which stated that even though wicked and unworthy communicants consumed the bread and wine in the Lord's Supper, they were not "partakers of Christ". This was a point of disagreement between Calvinists and Lutherans, and Article 29 affirmed the Calvinist view. In 1563, however, Elizabeth was concerned that such a theological slight would hurt diplomatic ties with Lutheran nations. She may also have been personally sympathetic to the Lutheran view. Nevertheless, this article was later restored, and the Thirty-Nine Articles were given parliamentary approval in 1571.

The settlement ensured the Church of England was definitively Protestant, but it was unclear what kind of Protestantism was being adopted. It did not help matters that royal injunctions issued in 1559 sometimes contradicted the prayer book. The injunctions specified traditional communion wafers should be used for Holy Communion even though the prayer book said to use regular bread. There was also confusion over the location and positioning of the communion tables. According to the injunctions when not being used for communion, the tables were to be moved where the stone altars once stood.

The prayer book's eucharistic theology implied a real spiritual presence, with Article 28 of the Thirty-nine Articles teaching that the body of Christ was eaten "only after an heavenly and spiritual manner". Nevertheless, there was enough ambiguity to allow later theologians to articulate various versions of Anglican eucharistic theology.

A Calvinist consensus prevailed among leading churchmen during the reigns of Elizabeth and James I. Most Calvinists were willing to conform to the terms of the religious settlement. Others wanted further reforms to make the Church of England more like the Continental Reformed churches. These nonconformist Calvinists became known as Puritans. Some Puritans refused to bow at the name of Jesus, to make the sign of the cross in baptism, use wedding rings or organ music in church. They especially resented the requirement that clergy wear the white surplice and clerical cap. Puritan clergymen preferred to wear black academic attire (see Vestments controversy). Many Puritans believed the Church of England should follow the example of Reformed churches in other parts of Europe and adopt presbyterian polity, under which government by bishops would be replaced with government by elders. But all attempts to enact further reforms through Parliament were blocked by the Queen.

Conformists, such as John Bridges and John Whitgift, agreed with Puritans, like Thomas Cartwright, on the doctrines of predestination and election, but they resented Puritans for obsessing over minor ceremonies. There were anti-Calvinists, such as Benjamin Carier and Humphrey Leech. However, criticism of Calvinism was suppressed.

== Stuart period (1603 to 1714) ==
=== James I (1603–1625) ===
In 1603, the King of Scotland inherited the English crown as James I. The Church of Scotland was even more strongly Reformed, having a presbyterian polity and John Knox's liturgy, the Book of Common Order. James was himself a moderate Calvinist, and the Puritans hoped the King would move the English Church in the Scottish direction. James, however, did the opposite, forcing the Scottish Church to accept bishops and the Five Articles of Perth, all attempts to make it as similar as possible to the English Church.

At the start of his reign, Puritans presented the Millenary Petition to the King. This petition for church reform was referred to the Hampton Court Conference of 1604, which agreed to produce a new version of the Book of Common Prayer that incorporated a few changes requested by the Puritans. The most important outcome of the Conference, however, was the decision to produce a new translation of the Bible, the 1611 King James Version. While a disappointment for Puritans, the provisions were aimed at satisfying moderate Puritans and isolating them from their more radical counterparts.

The Church of England's dominant theology was still Calvinism, but a group of theologians associated with Bishop Lancelot Andrewes disagreed with many aspects of the Reformed tradition, especially its teaching on predestination. Like the Puritans, Andrewes engaged in his own brand of nonconformity. In his private chapel, he added ceremonies and formulas not authorised in the prayer book, such as burning incense. James I tried to balance the Puritan forces within his church with followers of Andrewes, promoting many of them at the end of his reign. This group was led by Richard Neile of Durham and became known as the Durham House group. They looked to the Church Fathers rather than the Reformers and preferred using the more traditional 1549 prayer book. Due to their belief in free will, this new faction is known as the Arminian party, but their high church orientation was more controversial.

=== English Civil War ===
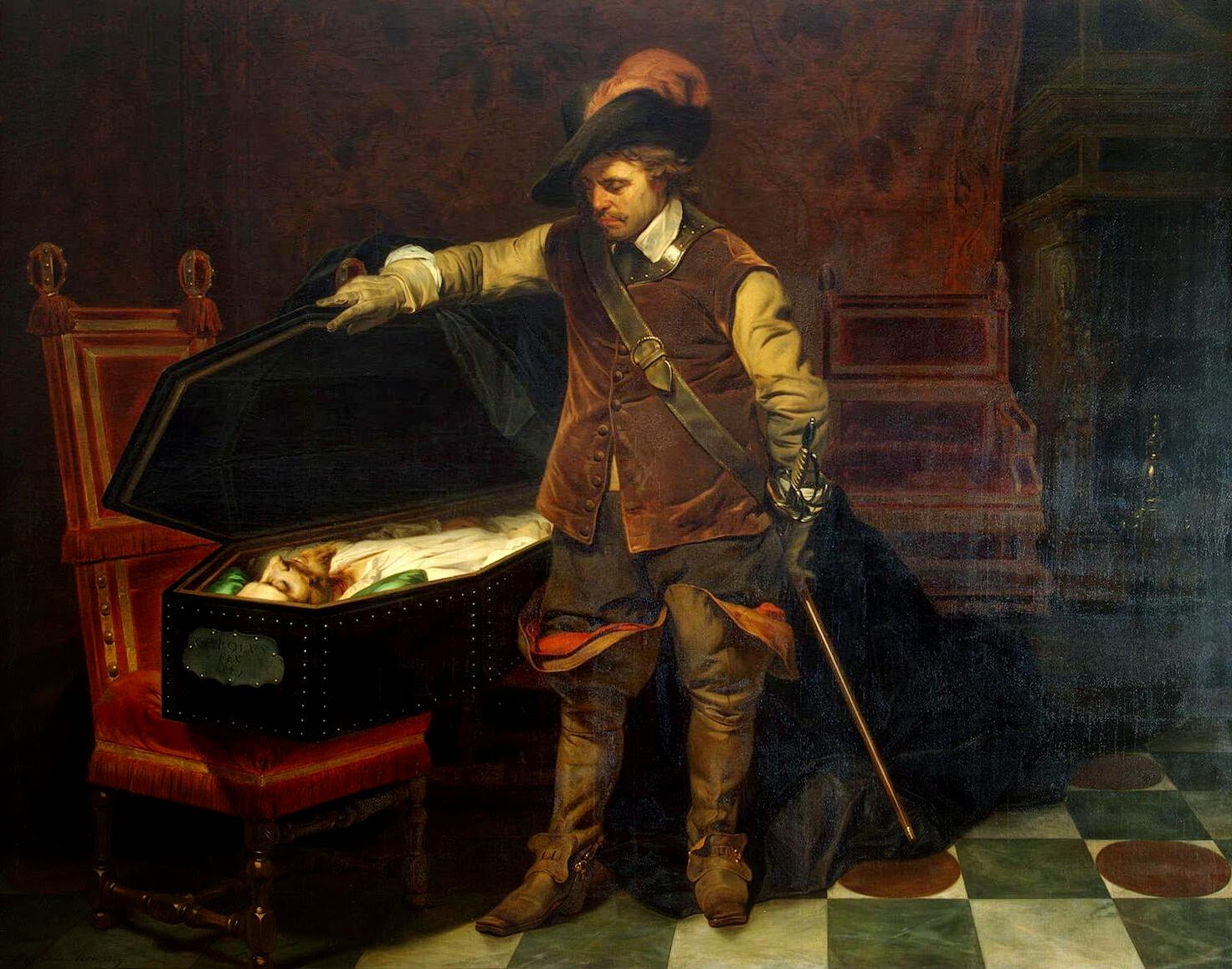
Cromwell and the corpse of Charles I

For the next century, through the reigns of James I and Charles I, and culminating in the English Civil War and the protectorate of Oliver Cromwell, there were significant swings back and forth between two factions: the Puritans (and other radicals) who sought more far-reaching reform, and the more conservative churchmen who aimed to keep closer to traditional beliefs and practices. The failure of political and ecclesiastical authorities to submit to Puritan demands for more extensive reform was one of the causes of open warfare. By continental standards the level of violence over religion was not high, but the casualties included a king, Charles I and an archbishop of Canterbury, William Laud. For about a decade (1647–1660), Christmas was another casualty as Parliament abolished all feasts and festivals of the Church to rid England of outward signs of Popishness. Under the Protectorate of the Commonwealth of England from 1649 to 1660, Anglicanism was disestablished, presbyterian ecclesiology was introduced as an adjunct to the Episcopal system, the Articles were replaced with a non-Presbyterian version of the Westminster Confession (1647), and the Book of Common Prayer was replaced by the Directory of Public Worship.

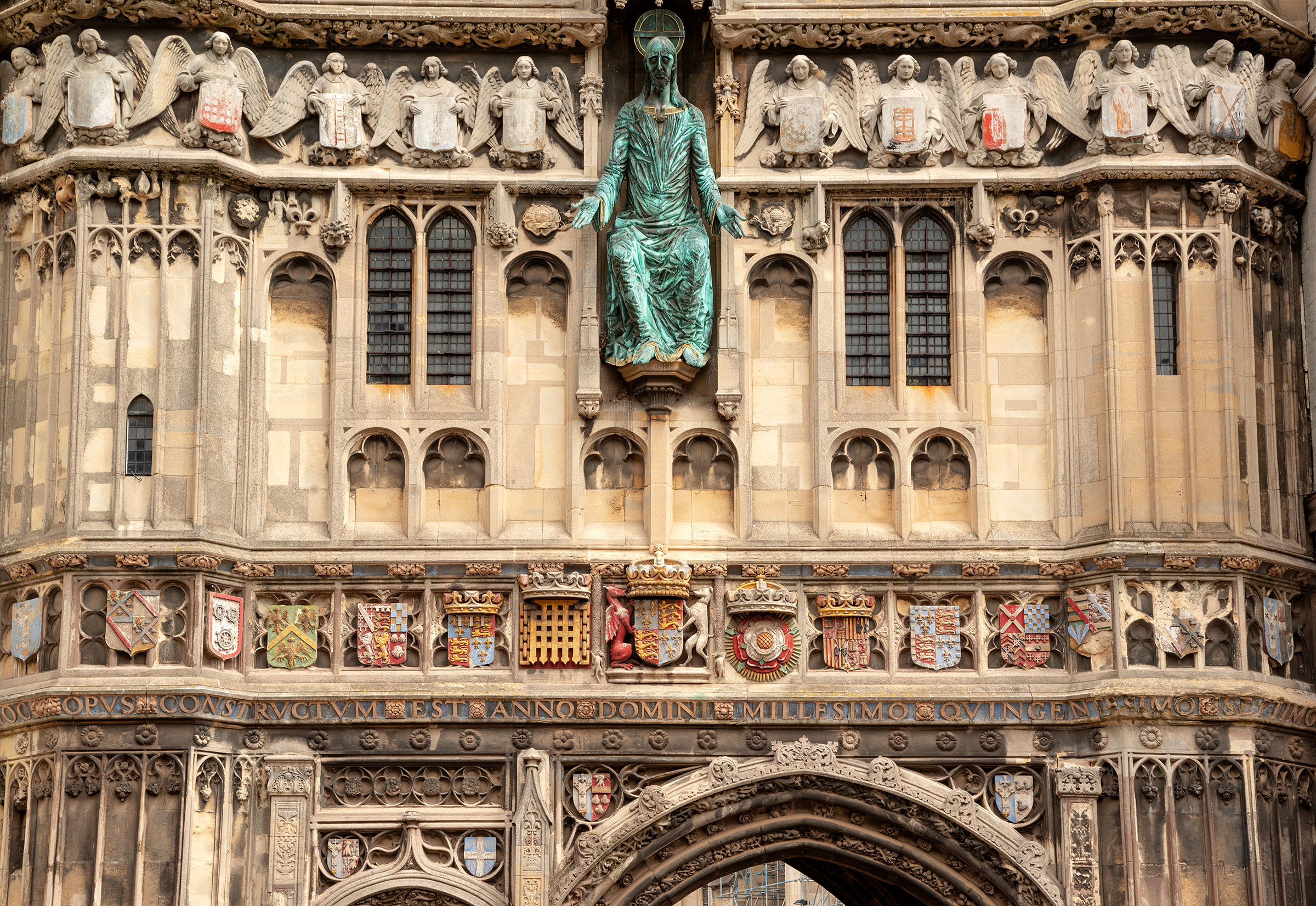
The Christchurch Gate at Canterbury Cathedral; the original statue of Christ was destroyed by Puritans in 1643 and replaced with an entirely new statue in 1990

Despite this, about one quarter of English clergy refused to conform. In the midst of the apparent triumph of Calvinism, the 17th century brought forth a Golden Age of Anglicanism. The Caroline Divines, such as Andrewes, Laud, Herbert Thorndike, Jeremy Taylor, John Cosin, Thomas Ken and others rejected Roman claims and refused to adopt the ways and beliefs of the Continental Protestants. The historic episcopate was preserved. Truth was to be found in Scripture and the bishops and archbishops, which were to be bound to the traditions of the first four centuries of the Church's history. The role of reason in theology was affirmed.

=== Restoration ===
With the Restoration of Charles II, Anglicanism too was restored in a form not far removed from the Elizabethan version. One difference was that the ideal of encompassing all the people of England in one religious organisation, taken for granted by the Tudors, had to be abandoned. The 1662 revision of the Book of Common Prayer became the unifying text of the ruptured and repaired Church after the disaster that was the civil war.

When the new king Charles II reached the throne in 1660, he restored priests who had been expelled from their benefices and actively appointed his supporters who had resisted Cromwell to vacancies. He translated the leading supporters to the most prestigious and rewarding sees. He also considered the need to reestablish episcopal authority and to reincorporate "moderate dissenters" in order to effect Protestant reconciliation. In some cases turnover was heavy—he made four appointments to the diocese of Worcester in four years 1660–63, moving the first three up to better positions.

James II of England was overthrown by William of Orange in 1688, and the new king moved quickly to ease religious tensions. Many of his supporters had been English Dissenters or Nonconformist non-Anglicans. With the Act of Toleration enacted on 24 May 1689, Nonconformists had freedom of worship. That is, those Protestants who dissented from the Church of England such as Baptists, Congregationalists and Quakers were allowed their own places of worship and their own teachers and preachers, subject to acceptance of certain oaths of allegiance. These privileges expressly did not apply to Catholics and Unitarians, and it continued the existing social and political disabilities for dissenters, including exclusion from political office. The religious settlement of 1689 shaped policy down to the 1830s. The Church of England was not only dominant in religious affairs, but it blocked outsiders from responsible positions in national and local government, business, professions and academe. In practice, the doctrine of the divine right of kings persisted Old animosities had diminished, and a new spirit of toleration was abroad. Restrictions on Nonconformists were mostly either ignored or slowly lifted. The Protestants, including the Quakers, who worked to overthrow King James II were rewarded. Toleration Act 1688 allowed nonconformists who have their own chapels, teachers, and preachers, censorship was relaxed. The religious landscape of England assumed its present form, with an Anglican established church occupying the middle ground, and Roman Catholics and those Puritans who dissented from the establishment, too strong to be suppressed altogether, having to continue their existence outside the national church rather than controlling it.

== 18th century ==
=== Spread of Anglicanism outside England ===
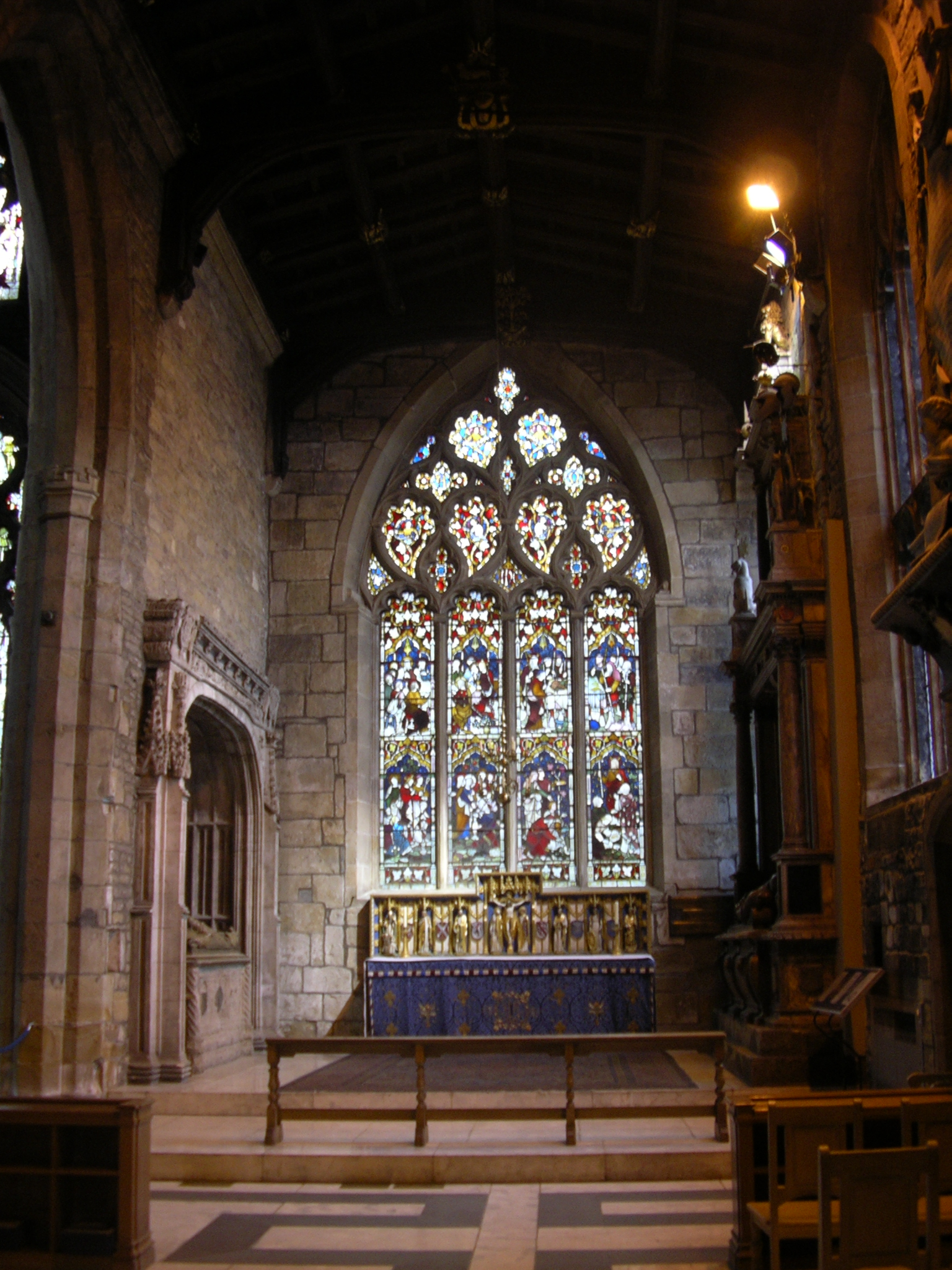
An Anglican chapel at Sheffield Cathedral

The history of Anglicanism since the 17th century has been one of greater geographical and cultural expansion and diversity, accompanied by a concomitant diversity of liturgical and theological profession and practice.

At the same time as the English reformation, the Church of Ireland was separated from Rome and adopted articles of faith similar to England's Thirty-Nine Articles. However, unlike England, the Anglican church there was never able to capture the loyalty of the majority of the population (who still adhered to Roman Catholicism). As early as 1582, the Scottish Episcopal Church was inaugurated when James VI of Scotland sought to reintroduce bishops when the Church of Scotland became fully presbyterian (see Scottish reformation). The Scottish Episcopal Church enabled the creation of the Episcopal Church in the United States of America after the American Revolution, by consecrating in Aberdeen the first American bishop, Samuel Seabury, who had been refused consecration by bishops in England, due to his inability to take the oath of allegiance to the English crown prescribed in the Order for the Consecration of Bishops. The polity and ecclesiology of the Scottish and American churches, as well as their daughter churches, thus tends to be distinct from those spawned by the English church—reflected, for example, in their looser conception of provincial government, and their leadership by a presiding bishop or primus rather than by a metropolitan or archbishop. The names of the Scottish and American churches inspire the customary term Episcopalian for an Anglican; the term being used in these and other parts of the world.

At the time of the English Reformation the four (now six) Welsh dioceses were all part of the Province of Canterbury and remained so until 1920 when the Church in Wales was created as a province of the Anglican Communion. The intense interest in the Christian faith which characterised the Welsh in the 18th and 19th centuries was not present in the sixteenth and most Welsh people went along with the church's reformation more because the English government was strong enough to impose its wishes in Wales rather than out of any real conviction.

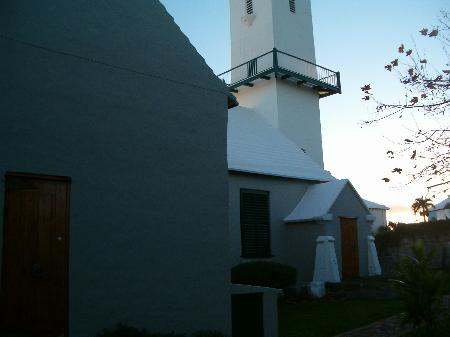
Consecrated in 1612, Saint Peter's Church, in St George's, Bermuda, is the oldest Church of England (now Anglican) church outside the British Isles, and the oldest Protestant church in the New World.

Anglicanism spread outside of the British Isles by means of emigration as well as missionary effort. The 1609 wreck of the flagship of the Virginia Company, the Sea Venture, resulted in the settlement of Bermuda by that Company. This was made official in 1612, when the town of St George's, now the oldest surviving English settlement in the New World, was established. It is the location of St Peter's Church, the oldest-surviving Anglican church outside the British Isles (Britain and Ireland), and the oldest surviving non-Roman Catholic church in the New World, also established in 1612. It remained part of the Church of England until 1978, when the Anglican Church of Bermuda separated. The Church of England was the state religion in Bermuda and a system of parishes was set up for the religious and political subdivision of the colony (they survive, today, as both civil and religious parishes). Bermuda, like Virginia, tended to the Royalist side during the Civil War. The conflict in Bermuda resulted in the expulsion of Independent Puritans from the island (the Eleutheran Adventurers, who settled Eleuthera, in the Bahamas). The church in Bermuda, before the Civil War, had a somewhat Presbyterian flavour, but mainstream Anglicanism was asserted afterwards (although Bermuda is also home to the oldest Presbyterian church outside the British Isles). Bermudians were required by law in the 17th century to attend Church of England services, and proscriptions similar to those in England existed on other denominations.

English missionary organisations such as USPG—then known as the Society for the Propagation of the Gospel in Foreign Parts, the Society for the Promotion of Christian Knowledge (SPCK) and the Church Missionary Society (CMS) were established in the 17th and 18th centuries to bring Anglican Christianity to the British colonies. By the 19th century, such missions were extended to other areas of the world. The liturgical and theological orientations of these missionary organisations were diverse. The SPG, for example, was in the 19th century influenced by the Catholic Revival in the Church of England, while the CMS was influenced by the Evangelicalism of the earlier Evangelical Revival. As a result, the piety, liturgy, and polity of the indigenous churches they established came to reflect these diverse orientations.

== 19th century ==
The Church of Ireland, an Anglican establishment, was disestablished in Ireland in 1869. The Church in Wales would later be disestablished in 1919, but in England the Church never lost its established role. However Methodists, Catholics and other denominations were relieved of many of their disabilities through the repeal of the Test and Corporation Acts, Catholic emancipation, and parliamentary reform. The Church responded by greatly enlarging its role of activities, and turning to voluntary contributions for funding.

=== Revivals ===
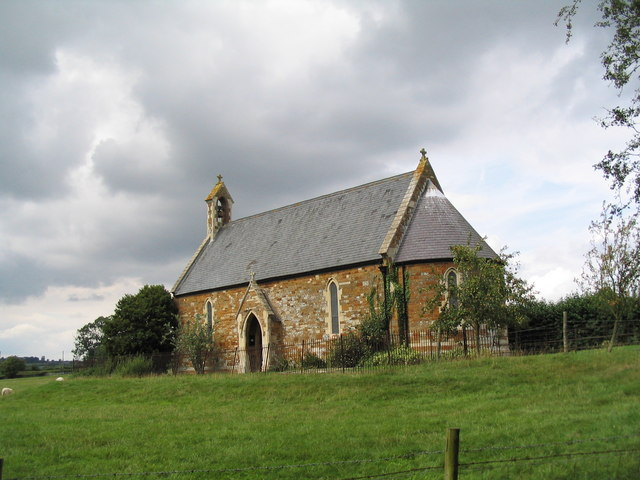
Church at Blaston, Leicestershire, rebuilt in a simple Gothic style in 1878

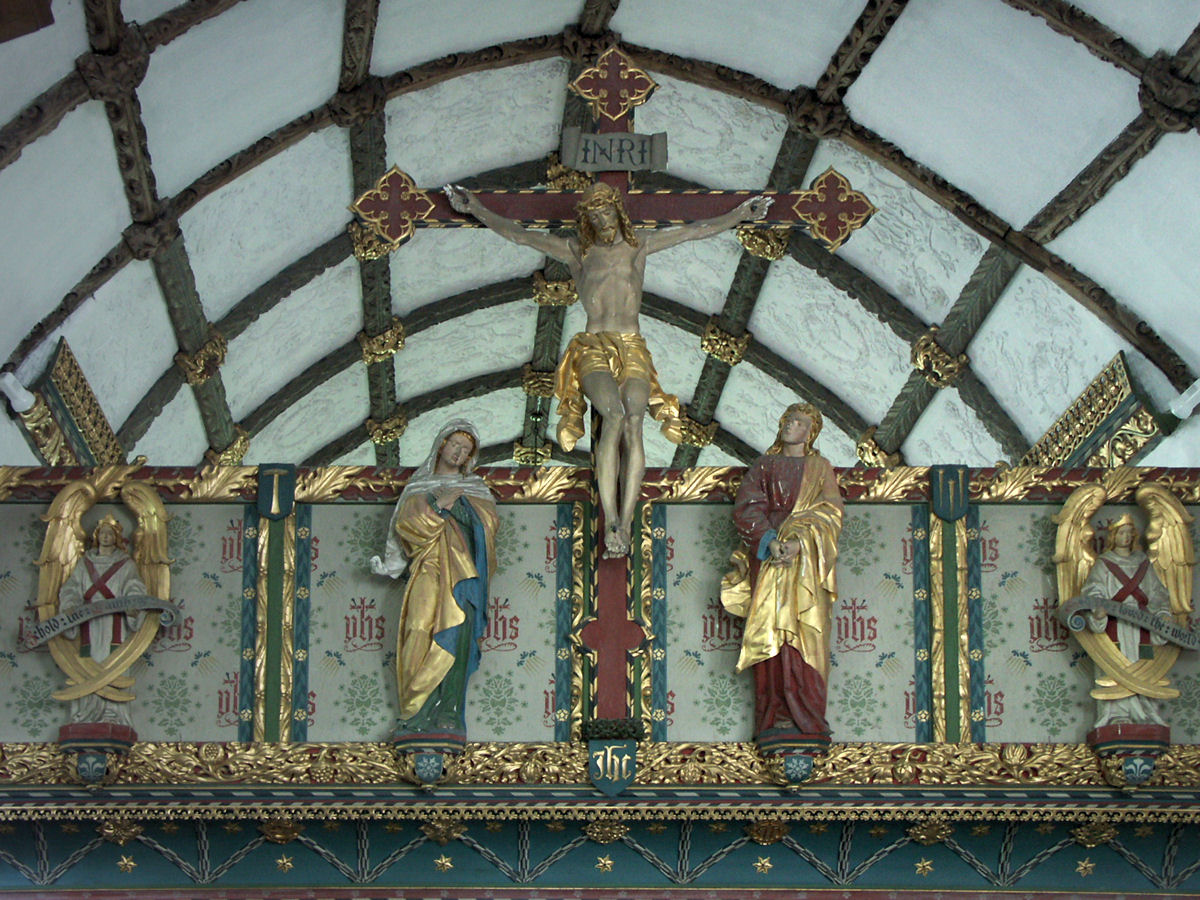
Crucifix on the rood screen at Blisland, Cornwall

The Plymouth Brethren seceded from the established church in the 1820s. The church in this period was affected by the Evangelical revival and the growth of industrial towns in the Industrial Revolution. There was an expansion of the various Nonconformist churches, notably Methodism. From the 1830s the Oxford Movement became influential and occasioned the revival of Anglo-Catholicism. From 1801 the Church of England and the Church of Ireland were unified and this situation lasted until the disestablishment of the Irish church in 1871 (by the Irish Church Act, 1869).

The growth of the twin "revivals" in 19th century Anglicanism—Evangelical and Catholic—was hugely influential. The Evangelical Revival informed important social movements such as the abolition of slavery, child welfare legislation, prohibition of alcohol, the development of public health and public education. It led to the creation of the Church Army, an evangelical and social welfare association and informed piety and liturgy, most notably in the development of Methodism.

The Catholic Revival had a more penetrating impact by transforming the liturgy of the Anglican Church, repositioning the Eucharist as the central act of worship in place of the daily offices, and reintroducing the use of vestments, ceremonial, and acts of piety (such as Eucharistic adoration) that had long been prohibited in the English church and (to a certain extent) in its daughter churches. It influenced Anglican theology, through such Oxford Movement figures as John Henry Newman, Edward Pusey, as well as the Christian socialism of Charles Gore and Frederick Maurice. Much work was done to introduce a more medieval style of church furnishing in many churches. Neo-Gothic in many different forms became the norm rather than the earlier Neo-Classical forms. Both revivals led to considerable missionary efforts in parts of the British Empire.

=== Expanded roles at home and worldwide ===
During the 19th century, the Church expanded greatly at home and abroad. The funding came largely from voluntary contributions. In England and Wales it doubled the number of active clergyman, and built or enlarged several thousand churches. Around mid-century it was consecrating seven new or rebuilt churches every month. It proudly took primary responsibility for a rapid expansion of elementary education, with parish-based schools, and diocesan-based colleges to train the necessary teachers. In the 1870s, the national government assume part of the funding; in 1880 the Church was educating 73% of all students. In addition there was a vigorous home mission, with many clergy, scripture readers, visitors, deaconesses and Anglican sisters in the rapidly growing cities. Overseas the Church kept up with the expanding Empire. It sponsored extensive missionary work, supporting 90 new bishoprics and thousands of missionaries across the globe.

In addition to local endowments and pew rentals, Church financing came from a few government grants, and especially from voluntary contributions. The result was that some old rural parishes were well funded, and most of the rapidly growing urban parishes were underfunded.

Church of England voluntary contributions, 1860–1885	per cent
Building restoring and endowing churches	42%
Home missions	9%
Foreign missions	12%
Elementary schools and training colleges	26%
Church institution—literary	1%
Church institution—charitable	5%
Clergy charities	2%
Theological schools	1%
Total	100%
	£80,500,000
Source: Clark 1962.	

=== Prime ministers and the Queen ===
Throughout the 19th century patronage continued to play a central role in Church affairs. Tory Prime Ministers appointed most of the bishops before 1830, selecting men who had served the party, or had been college tutors of sponsoring politicians, or were near relations of noblemen. In 1815, 11 bishops came from noble families; 10 had been the tutors of a senior official. Theological achievement or personal piety were not critical factors in their selection. Indeed, the Church was often called the "praying section of the Tory party." Not since Newcastle, over a century before, did a prime minister pay as much attention to church vacancies as William Ewart Gladstone. He annoyed Queen Victoria by making appointments she did not like. He worked to match the skills of candidates to the needs of specific church offices. He supported his party by favouring Liberals who would support his political positions. His counterpart, Disraeli, favoured Conservative bishops to a small extent, but took care to distribute bishoprics so as to balance various church factions. He occasionally sacrificed party advantage to choose a more qualified candidate. On most issues Disraeli and Queen Victoria were close, but they frequently clashed over church nominations because of her aversion to high churchmen.

== 20th century ==
=== 1914–1970 ===
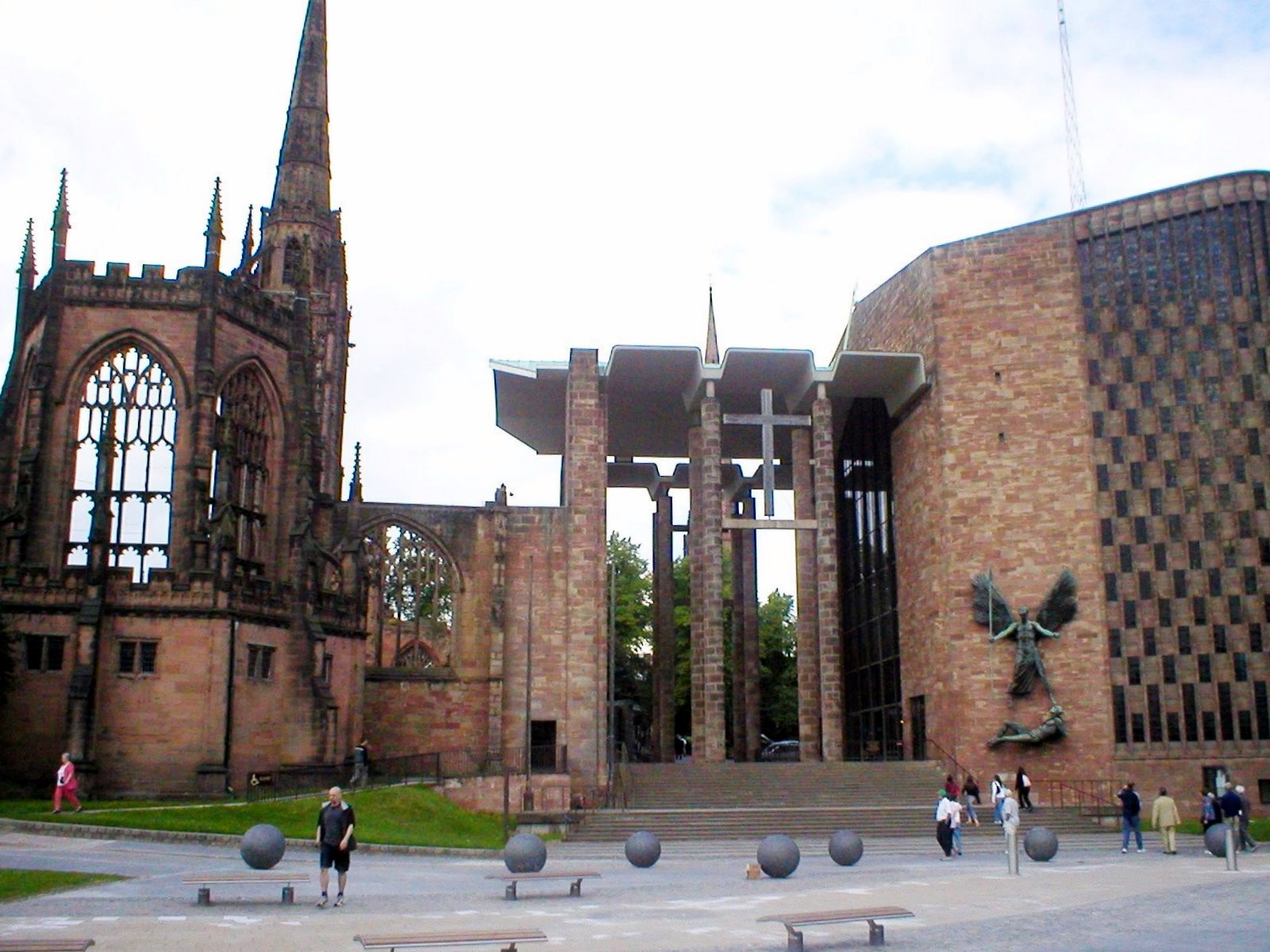
The old and new Coventry Cathedrals in the Diocese of Coventry (the new cathedral was built next to the ruins of the old, which had been bombed in the Second World War)

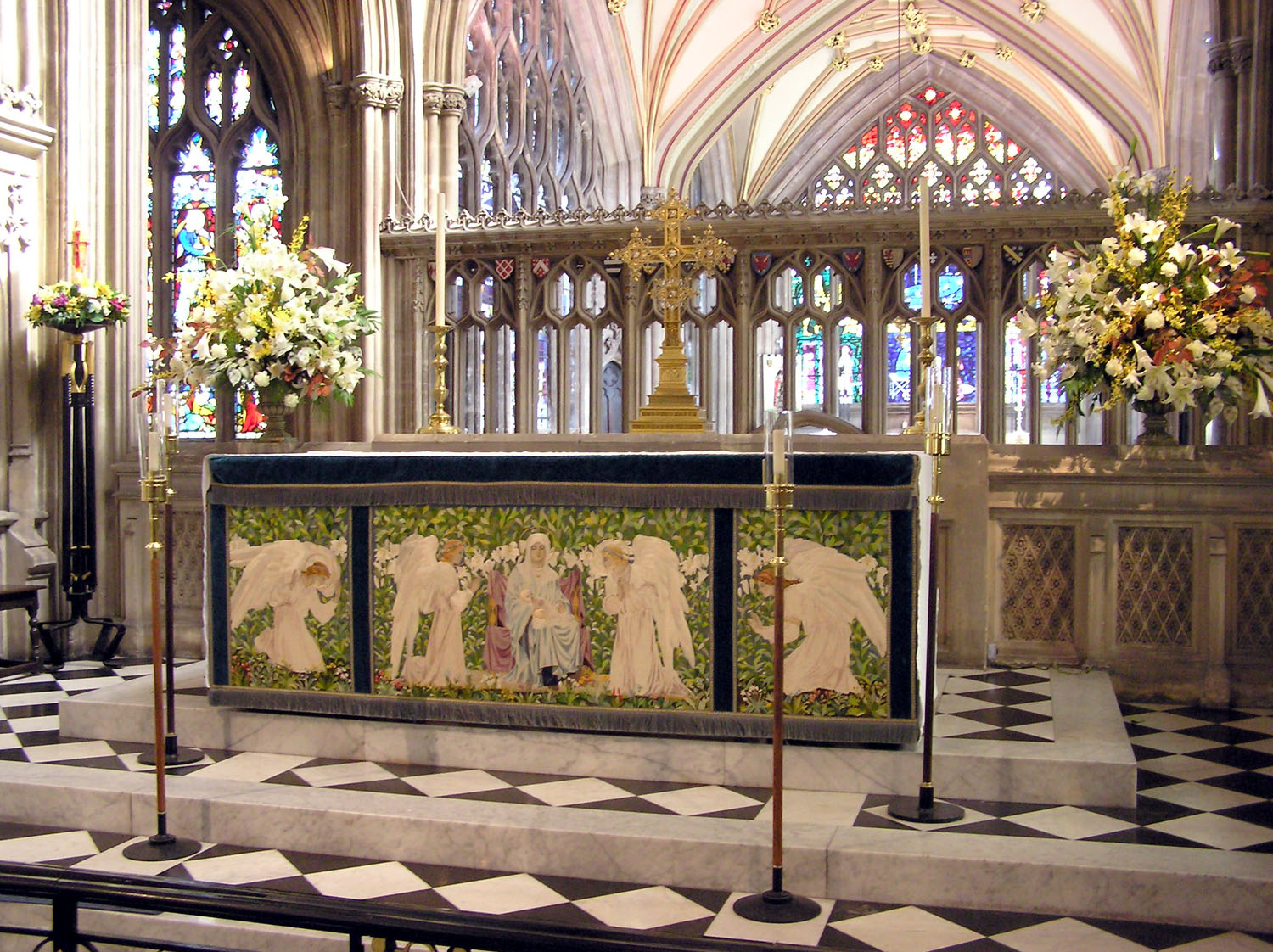
The altar in St Mary's Anglican Church, Redcliffe, Bristol: showing the effects of 20th century liturgical reform the altar stands at the east end of the nave

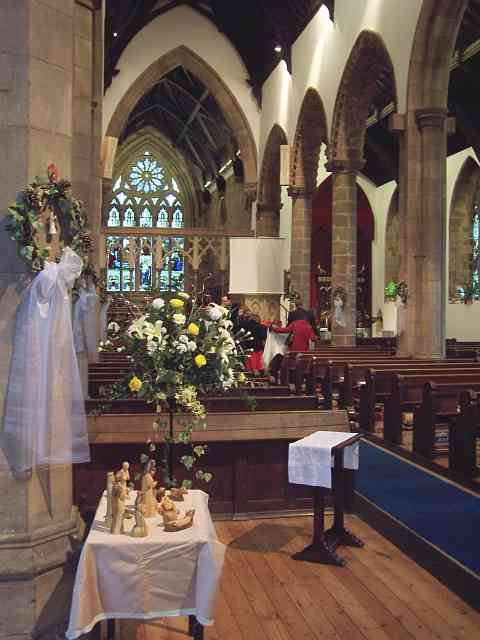
Ilkeston Parish Church, Derbyshire: the interior after the family communion service on Christmas Day, 2007

The current form of military chaplain dates from the era of the First World War. A chaplain provides spiritual and pastoral support for service personnel, including the conduct of religious services at sea or in the field. The Army Chaplains Department was granted the prefix "Royal" in recognition of the chaplains' wartime service. The Chaplain General of the British Army was Bishop John Taylor Smith who held the post from 1901 to 1925.

While the Church of England was historically identified with the upper classes, and with the rural gentry, William Temple, archbishop of Canterbury (1942–1944), was both a prolific theologian and a social activist, preaching Christian socialism and taking an active role in the Labour Party until 1921. He advocated a broad and inclusive membership in the Church of England as a means of continuing and expanding the church's position as the established church. He became archbishop of Canterbury in 1942, and the same year he published Christianity and Social Order. The best-seller attempted to marry faith and socialism—by "socialism" he meant a deep concern for the poor. The book helped solidify Anglican support for the emerging welfare state. Temple was troubled by the high degree of animosity inside, and between the leading religious groups in Britain. He promoted ecumenicism, working to establish better relationships with the Nonconformists, Jews and Catholics, managing in the process to overcome his anti-Catholic bias.

=== Prayer Book Crisis ===
Parliament passed the Enabling Act in 1919 to enable the new Church Assembly, with three houses for bishops, clergy, and laity, to propose legislation for the Church, subject to formal approval of Parliament. A crisis suddenly emerged in 1927 over the Church's proposal to revise the classic Book of Common Prayer, which had been in daily use since 1662. The goal was to better incorporate moderate Anglo-Catholicism into the life of the Church. The bishops sought a more tolerant, comprehensive established Church. After internal debate the Church's new Assembly gave its approval. Evangelicals inside the Church, and Nonconformists outside, were outraged because they understood England's religious national identity to be emphatically Protestant and anti-Catholic. They denounced the revisions as a concession to ritualism and tolerance of Roman Catholicism. They mobilized support in parliament, which twice rejected the revisions after intensely heated debates. The Anglican hierarchy compromised in 1929, while strictly prohibiting extreme and Anglo-Catholic practices.

=== World War II and postwar ===
During the Second World War the head of chaplaincy in the British Army was an Anglican chaplain-general, Charles Symons (with the military rank of major-general), who was formally under the control of the permanent under-secretary of state. An assistant chaplain-general was a chaplain 1st class (full colonel), and a senior chaplain was a chaplain 2nd class (lieutenant colonel). At home the Church saw its role as the moral conscience of the state. It gave enthusiastic support for the war against Nazi Germany. George Bell, bishop of Chichester and a few clergymen spoke out that the aerial bombing of German cities was immoral. They were grudgingly tolerated. Bishop Bell was chastised by fellow clergy members and passed over for promotion. The Archbishop of York replied, "it is a lesser evil to bomb the war-loving Germans than to sacrifice the lives of our fellow countrymen..., or to delay the delivery of many now held in slavery".

A movement towards unification with the Methodist Church in the 1960s failed to pass through all the required stages on the Anglican side, being rejected by the General Synod in 1972. This was initiated by the Methodists and welcomed on the part of the Anglicans but full agreement on all points could not be reached.

==== Divorce ====
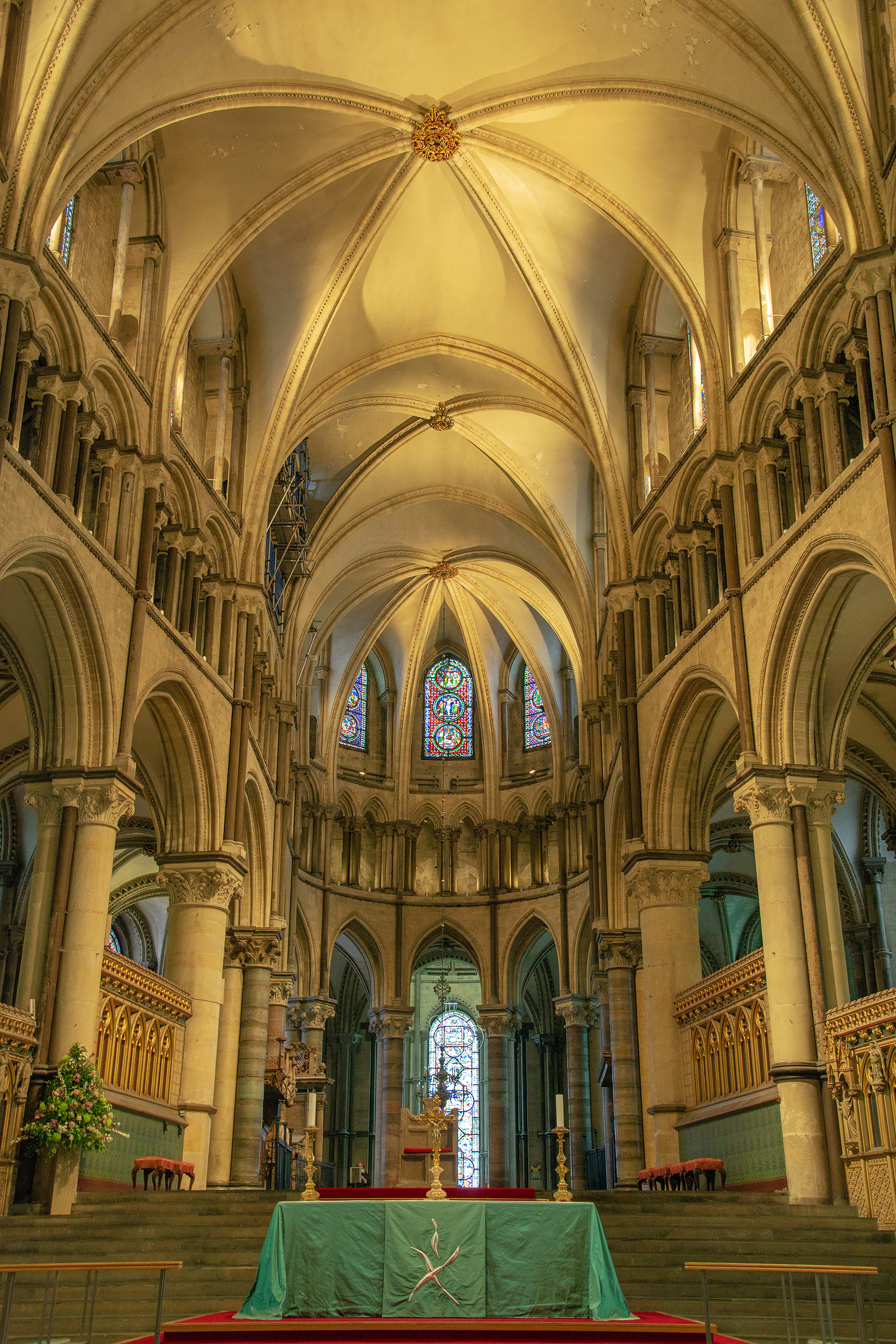
Canterbury Cathedral altar

Standards of morality in Britain changed dramatically after the world wars, in the direction of more personal freedom, especially in sexual matters. The Church tried to hold the line, and was especially concerned to stop the rapid trend toward divorce. It reaffirmed in 1935 that, "in no circumstances can Christian men or women re-marry during the lifetime of a wife or a husband." When king Edward VIII wanted to marry Mrs. Wallis Simpson, a newly divorced woman, in 1936, the archbishop of Canterbury, Cosmo Gordon Lang led the opposition, insisting that Edward must go. Lang was later lampooned in Punch for a lack of "Christian charity".

Prime Minister Stanley Baldwin also objected vigorously to the marriage, noting that "although it is true that standards are lower since the war it only leads people to expect a higher standard from their King." Baldwin refused to consider Churchill's concept of a morganatic marriage where Wallis would not become Queen consort and any children they might have would not inherit the throne. After the governments of the Dominions also refused to support the plan, Edward abdicated in order to marry the woman.

When Princess Margaret wanted in 1952 to marry Peter Townsend, a commoner who had been divorced, the Church did not directly intervene but the government warned she had to renounce her claim to the throne and could not be married in church. Randolph Churchill later expressed concern about rumours about a specific conversation between the archbishop of Canterbury, Geoffrey Fisher, and the Princess while she was still planning to marry Townsend. In Churchill's view, "the rumour that Fisher had intervened to prevent the Princess from marrying Townsend has done incalculable harm to the Church of England", according to research completed by historian Ann Sumner Holmes. Margaret's official statement, however, specified that the decision had been made "entirely alone", although she was mindful of the Church's teaching on the indissolubility of marriage. Holmes summarizes the situation as, "The image that endured was that of a beautiful young princess kept from the man she loved by an inflexible Church. It was an image and a story that evoked much criticism both of Archbishop Fisher and of the Church' policies regarding remarriage after divorce."

However, when Margaret actually did divorce (Antony Armstrong-Jones, 1st Earl of Snowdon), in 1978, the then archbishop of Canterbury, Donald Coggan, did not attack her, and instead offered support.

In 2005, Prince Charles married Camilla Parker Bowles, a divorcée, in a civil ceremony. Afterwards, the then archbishop of Canterbury, Rowan Williams, gave the couple a formal service of blessing. In fact, the arrangements for the wedding and service were strongly supported by the Archbishop "consistent with the Church of England guidelines concerning remarriage" because the bride and groom had recited a "strongly-worded" act of penitence, a confessional prayer written by Thomas Cranmer, archbishop of Canterbury to King Henry VIII. That was interpreted as a confession by the couple of past sins, albeit without specific reference and going "some way towards acknowledging concerns" over their past misdemeanours.

=== 1970–present ===
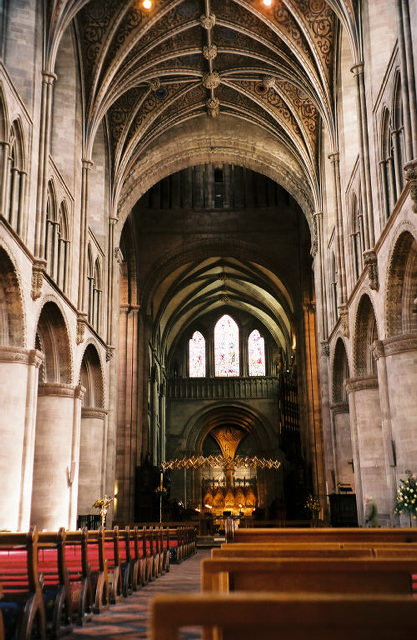
Hereford is one of the church's forty-three cathedrals, many with histories stretching back many centuries

The Church Assembly was replaced by the General Synod in 1970.

On 12 March 1994 the Church of England ordained its first female priests. On 11 July 2005 a vote was passed by the Church of England's General Synod in York to allow women's ordination as bishops. Both of these events were subject to opposition from some within the church who found difficulties in accepting them. Adjustments had to be made in the diocesan structure to accommodate those parishes unwilling to accept the ministry of women priests. (See women's ordination)

The first black archbishop of the Church of England, John Sentamu, formerly of Uganda, was enthroned on 30 November 2005 as archbishop of York.

In 2006 the Church of England at its General Synod made a public apology for the institutional role it played as a historic owner of slave plantations in Barbados and Barbuda. The Reverend Simon Bessant recounted the history of the church on the island of Barbados, West Indies, where through a charitable bequest received in 1710 by the Society for the Propagation of the Gospel, thousands of sugar plantation slaves had been appallingly treated and branded using red-hot irons as the property of the "society".

In 2010, for the first time in the history of the Church of England, more women than men were ordained as priests (290 women and 273 men).

== See also ==
- Church Army
- Church of Ireland#History
- Historical development of Church of England dioceses
- History of the Scottish Episcopal Church
- Religion in the United Kingdom
