= John Proctor (historian) =

English academic, schoolmaster and historian

John Proctor (1521–1558) was an English academic and schoolmaster, known as a historian.

== Life ==
A native of Somerset, Proctor was elected scholar of Corpus Christi College, Oxford, in January 1537, and fellow of All Souls' College in 1540, graduating B.A. on 20 October 1540, and M.A. on 25 June 1544. He resigned his fellowship in 1546.

Proctor was a convinced Roman Catholic. From 1553 to 1559, he was master of Tonbridge School, Kent, brought in by its founder Andrew Judde; there Francis Thynne was among his pupils.

== Family ==
Proctor's wife was named Elizabeth, and the poet Thomas Proctor is identified as their son; she remarried in 1559.

== See also ==
- Edmund Campion
- Robert Parsons
- Reginald Pole

== Works ==
Proctor wrote:

- The Fall of the late Arrian, London, 1549, dedicated to Princess Mary. Diarmaid MacCulloch has tentatively identified John Assheton as the subject of this work. While it contains anti-papal commentary, it is also critical of theological aspects of the Protestant Reformation and the unorthodox sectarian views it ushered in.
- The Historie of Wyates Rebellion, with the order and manner of resisting the same, London, 1554, black letter, dedicated to Queen Mary. It was one of the authorities on which Raphael Holinshed based his chronicle. This account of Wyatt's Rebellion gives details on the part played in opposing it by Proctor's patron Judde.
- The Waie home to Christ and Truth leadinge from Antichrist and Errour, 1556, dedicated to Queen Mary; reissued, without dedication, 1565; this is a translation of the Liber de Catholicæ fidei antiquitate, by Vincent of Lérins.

== Notes ==
Attribution

This article incorporates text from a publication now in the public domain: Lee, Sidney, ed. (1896). "Proctor, John". Dictionary of National Biography. Vol. 46. London: Smith, Elder & Co.
