= Court of High Commission =

Supreme ecclesiastic court in England

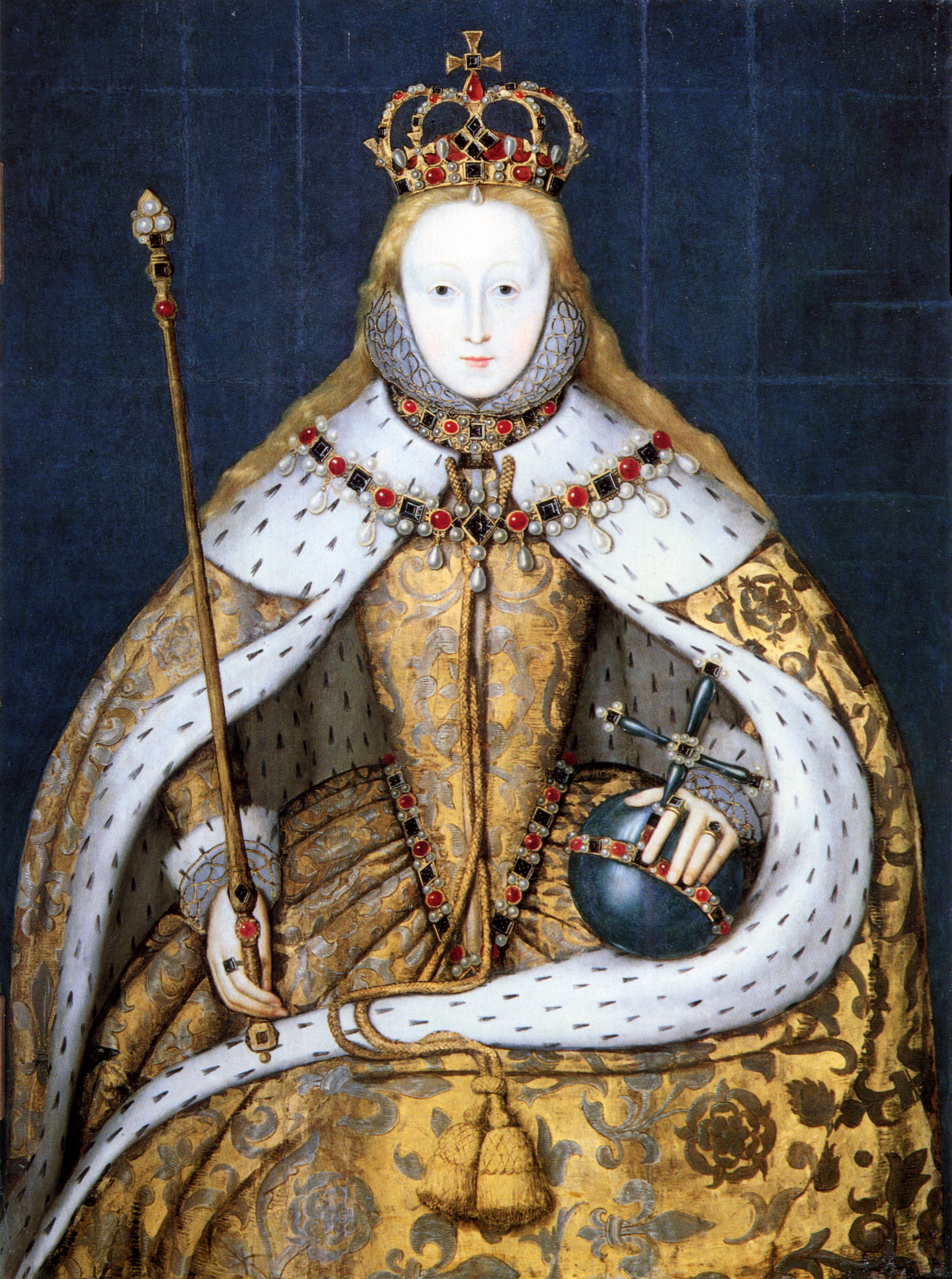
Queen Elizabeth I

The Court of High Commission was the supreme ecclesiastical court in England, from the inception of King Henry VIII's Act of Supremacy in 1534 to 1689, with periods of time where there was no court activity, like in 1641, when Parliament disbanded the court with the Triennial Act. John Whitgift, the Archbishop of Canterbury, obtained increased powers for the court by the 1580s. He proposed and had passed the Seditious Sectaries Act 1593, making Puritanism an offence.

The court reached the height of its powers during the Reformation. It was dissolved by the Long Parliament in 1641. The court was convened at will by the sovereign, and had near unlimited power over civil as well as church matters. There were also Scottish Courts of High Commission which vied with the General Assembly and lower church courts for authority. The court made a short reprise during the reign of James II in 1686, until it was disbanded for the last time by the Bill of Rights.

== Elizabethan era ==
During Elizabeth's reign, the Court of High Commission would expand its jurisdiction to hear appeals in response to the increasing litigiousness of Elizabethan England.

In Caudrey's Case, common law judges would confirm the High Commission's legitimacy to act as a court, High Commission for Ecclesiastical Causes presiding not only over religious practices, but also many aspects of marriages and marriage related offenses. Opposition persisted among legal commentators, including Edward Coke, even after the ruling in Caudry's Case.

Shortly after the coronation of Elizabeth I, the Act of Supremacy 1558 combined the powers of the civil and ecclesiastical courts. The Act of Supremacy legitimized the Crown's prosecutorial power by granting Elizabeth the consent of Parliament. The crown's newly legitimized power to prosecute "altered the barrier between public interest and private conscience." This meant that by using the supreme power of the crown, the consent of the Parliament, and the doctrine of ex officio mero, as defined by Marklund as: "by virtue of the 'mere office' of the judge—[he may] proceed on his own initiative against a person even though no public accusation had been made—". The judge would have the accused swear the ex officio oath, and then would decide whether or not the person he accused was guilty or innocent. During James' ascent to the throne, Puritans brought concerns over the Court of High Commission's use of the ex officio oath, as well as the court's practice of pre-trial detainment, and its jury-less trial.

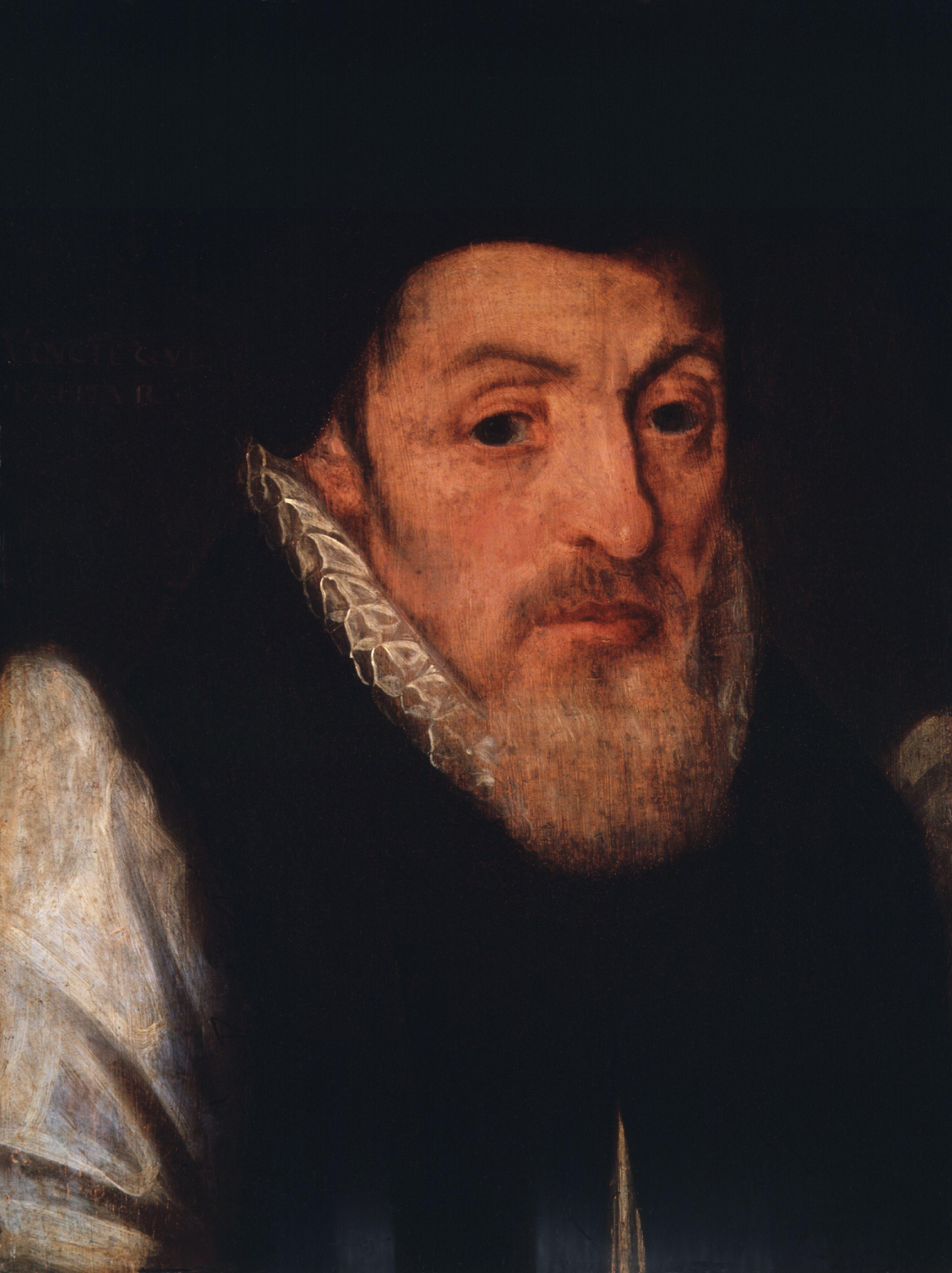
John Whitgift, Archbishop of Canterbury

Clegg also argued that towards the end of Elizabeth's reign, the Court of High Commission's critics grew considerably. Clegg credits the criticism to the courts "extension of its authority as an ecclesiastical court of appeal into judicial matters that arguably belonged within the jurisdiction of the common law."

The Court of High Commission would see to matters of matrimony and the separation of couples. As noted by Eric Josef Carlson, "As early as 1566, the commissioners had, rather than ordering cohabitation as was usual in these cases, sanctioned a 'cooling off period' during which one couple could continue to live apart." Carlson goes on to explain that when the wife refused to consider rejoining her husband, the court would exercise its power and excommunicate the wife. When the Court issued these orders of separation, they would include the payment of alimony to the wives, as was the case in 1575 and 1578. Carlson states the following: "the commissioners stopped well short of creating a new form either of divorce or of permanent legal separation. Since this approach was adopted only five times in twenty years, it was clearly undertaken only with reluctance and only when it was the most practical solution."

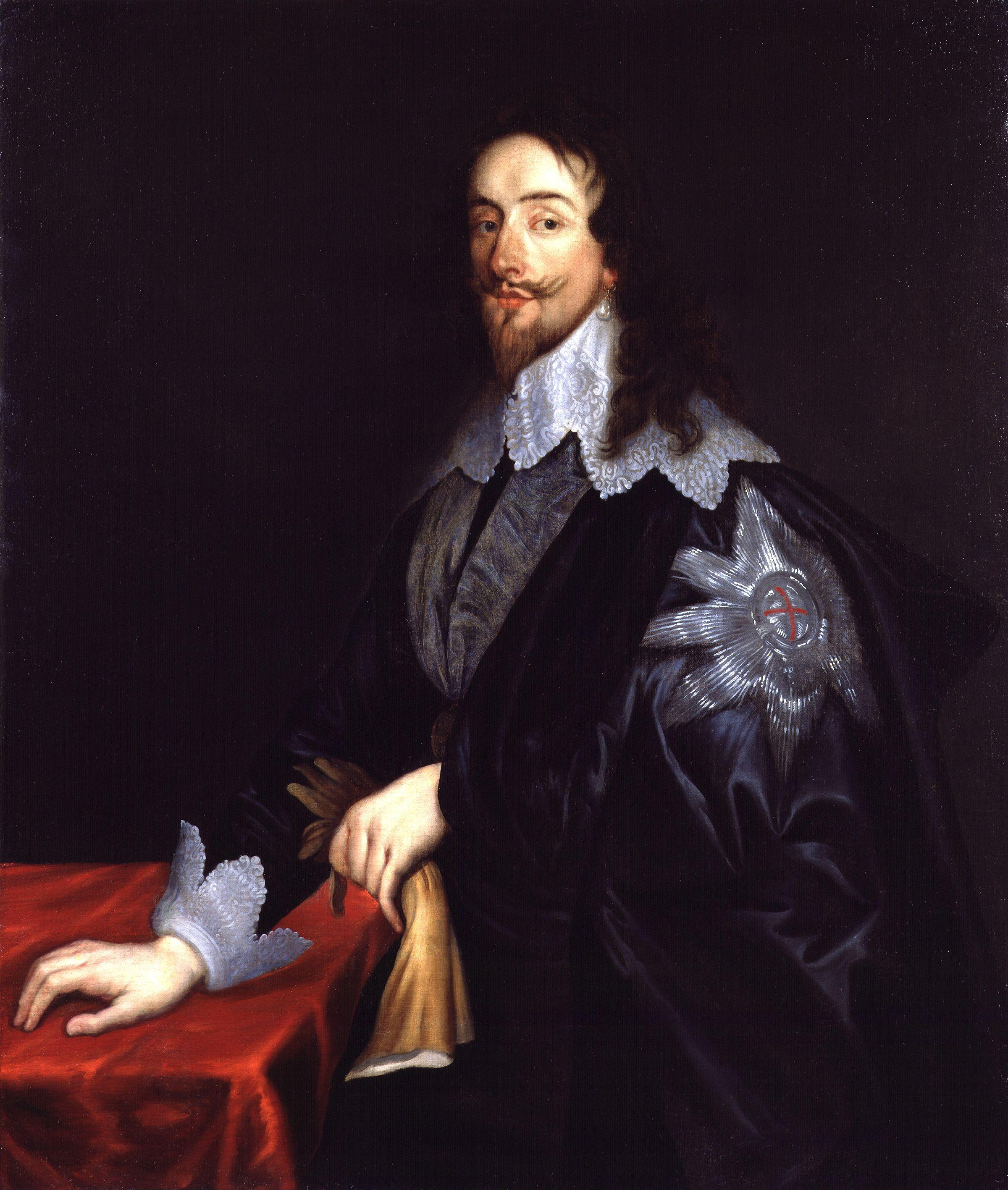
King Charles I, by Anthony van Dyck

== Dissolution ==
The Court of High Commission was dissolved by the Triennial Act 1640 (16 Cha. 1. c. 1), passed by Parliament in 1641. The Triennial Act required that the Crown summon Parliament every three years. It also impeached Archbishop William Laud, who had been supported by Charles I. Laud's new ideas and prayers had upset the Scots, and when Charles was refused an army from Parliament, which did not trust him, he created his own. This led in part to the English Civil War.

== Sources ==
- 'High Commission, Court of' , retrieved 4 August 2005
- The Glorious Revolution of 1688 , retrieved 4 August 2005
- ' A History of the Woodforde Family from 1300' , retrieved 4 August 2005
- Dutton, Richard (1991). Mastering the Revels: The Regulation and Censorship of English Renaissance Drama, London: Palgrave Macmillan ISBN 0-87745-335-7

== Further Readings ==
Roland G. Usher, The Rise and Fall of the High Commission, Oxford, Oxford University Press, 1968 (1st edn. 1913).
