= Stephen Brinkley =

Stephen Brinkley (c. 1550 – missing since 1585) was an English printer, covertly producing Roman Catholic literature under Queen Elizabeth I. He was imprisoned and tortured as manager of a secret press for the publication of devotional and controversial works.

== Life ==
Brinkley was a member of a Catholic lay organisation organised by George Gilbert and solemnly blessed by Pope Gregory XIII in 1580. Members of the organization, who were all unmarried men who owned property, undertook to live simply, dedicating most of their wealth to Catholic causes, and devote themselves to the promulgation of the Catholic faith. They raised funds for the support of priests, and made covert introductions between undercover priests and laity.

Brinkley assisted Robert Persons, Edmund Campion, and a group of priests in secretly transporting a printing press and materials to a house in East Ham, Essex. After a purchase of paper aroused suspicions, one of Brinkley's servants was caught and tortured on the rack. Nevertheless, the group began to publish Catholic propaganda.

After the publication of one book, Brinkley moved the press to the home of Francis Browne, brother of Anthony Browne, 1st Viscount Montagu. There, Persons issued A brief Censure upon two Books written in answer to M. Edmund Campion's Offer of Disputation in 1581. Despite the Douai imprint, government experts reported that the books were published in England. The landlord became suspicious, and Alexander Briant was questioned on the rack about the press.

Consequently, Brinkley relocated his press a second time, this time to a lodge belonging to the house of Cecilia Stonor, near Henley-on-Thames. There he printed Campion's "Decem Rationes", leaving copies on 27 June 1581 in St. Mary's Church, Oxford. On 16 July of that year, Campion was captured near Oxford, followed within a few weeks by Brinkley and his printers. Brinkley was tortured in the Tower of London, but released in June 1583.

Afterwards, Brinkley accompanied Persons first to Rome, where his name appears in the Pilgrim Book of the English College in the following September, and thence in the following year to Rouen. Here, with George Flinton, Brinkley printed a second edition of a work which Flinton had brought out in 1581, The Christian Directory. After Flinton's death about 1585, Brinkley continued to issue Catholic books. The date of his death is unknown.

Joseph Gillow mentions a work translated from the Italian (Paris, 1579), entitled The Exercise of a Christian Life ... newly perused and corrected by the translatour (James Sancer). Sancer, or Sanker, is known to have been the pseudonym of Brinkley. The 1913 Catholic Encyclopedia speculates that it may be one of the early issues of Brinkley's own press.
