= Caudrey's Case =

- Court: Queen's Bench
- Full case name: Robert Caudrey, Clerk v. George Atton
- Decided: 1595
- Citations: 5 Co. Rep. 1; 77 Eng. Rep. 1

Caudrey's Case (1595) 5 Coke Rep. 1 was a 16th-century case concerning the scope of ecclesiastical jurisdiction.

Ten years after the decision, the case was included in the Reports of Sir Edward Coke, where the jurist used it to evince a longstanding royal supremacy over ecclesiastical courts. The case was among the most popular in Coke's Reports.

== Background ==
In the late 16th century, English law consisted of a patchwork of overlapping subject matter jurisdictions, including both legal and ecclesiastical courts. As the volume of litigation swelled, so too did jurisdiction shopping among litigants. When the High Commission for Ecclesiastical Causes extended its jurisdiction to become an ecclesiastical appeals court, common law judges ruled in their favour in Caudrey's Case. Even so, widespread opposition persisted. This case confirmed the High Commission's legitimacy to act as a court; not only over religious practices but also many aspects of marriages and marriage related offenses of all kinds like adultery and not paying alimony.

== Facts ==
The case concerned a Tudor era statute under which the Archbishop of Canterbury was expected to confirm and consecrate without the authority of Rome, as an ancient common law right of the Archbishop, not needing Papal authority to exercise. An Archbishop or Bishop who refused to confirm and consecrate was guilty of praemunire, under the statute.

== Reception ==
For Beale and Morice the ecclesiastical jurisdiction and courts were in opposition to the native legal traditions and guarantees of English law under Magna Carta which they said called for outlawing "oaths and subscriptions". The ecclesiastical courts were in violation of the Great Charter. These attempts to assert the authority of the Crown as the highest legal authority under Magna Carta were challenged in Caudrey's Case. In his report on the case, Edward Coke followed Morice. Coke's report was attacked by Robert Persons.

According to Christopher Brooks: "In the long run the historical gloss Coke put on Caudrey's Case was as significant as the decision itself." Coke's arguments circulated among the society at court as the idea of the jurisdictional superiority of the common law over the eccleasiastical jurisdiction gained more supporters. As religious tensions escalated after the Gunpowder Plot, Jesuit priest Robert Persons published his response to Coke, attacking the premises of his report of Caudrey's Case and questioning Coke's claim that the Elizabethan Acts of Supremacy and Uniformity had not created or vested new powers but simply relied upon the existing ancient laws of England. Persons strongly criticized the idea of continuity of the common law reaching into the pre-Conquest period as asserted by Coke.
