= Benjamin Carier =

English clergyman and academic (1566–1614)

Benjamin Carier (1566–1614) was an English clergyman, a fellow of Chelsea College who was a well-publicised convert to Catholicism.

== Life ==
He was born in Kent, in 1566, son of Anthony Carier, a minister of the Church of England. He was admitted to Corpus Christi College, Cambridge, 28 February 1582, proceeded B.A. in 1586, was elected a fellow of his college 8 March 1589, and commenced M.A. in 1590. Soon afterwards he became tutor and studied divinity, especially the works of Augustine of Hippo. He proceeded B.D. in 1597, and was appointed one of the university preachers, and incorporated at Oxford the same year.

Soon after this he was presented by the Wotton family to the rectory of Paddlesworth in Kent, which he resigned in 1599. He was presented to the vicarage of Thurnham in the same county, with the church of Aldington annexed, on 27 March 1600, and that benefice till 1613. In 1602 he was presented, by Archbishop John Whitgift, whose domestic chaplain he then was, to the sinecure rectory of West Tarring in Sussex. In the same year he was created D.D. at Cambridge, and his fellowship was declared vacant.

He was appointed one of the chaplains in ordinary to James I. On 29 April 1603 he was collated by the Archbishop of Canterbury to the living of Old Romney in Kent. In 1608 he was nominated one of the first fellows of Chelsea College, projected by Matthew Sutcliffe as a seminary for defenders of Protestantism.

He obtained the king's leave to go to Spa for the benefit of his health, actually intending to study the workings of Catholicism. He went from Spa to Cologne, where he placed himself in the hands of Father Johannes Copperus, rector of the Jesuit College. King James ordered Isaac Casaubon and others to write to him (August 1613), with an injunction to return to England. Carier’s printed Missive addressed to the king from Liège, 13 December 1613, made his conversion public. Cardinal du Perron then invited him to France, for his assistance in a work which he was publishing against King James. Carier accepted the invitation, but died before mid-summer 1614.

George Hakewill published an elaborate answer to Carier in 1616. Carier’s polemical works continued to be reprinted late into the century. The Carier case had repercussions, in particular for John Howson who had been on good terms with him, and came under the suspicion of George Abbot in 1615; like Humphrey Leech, another convert, Carier moved in the Durham House circle with Howson, around Richard Neile.
