= John Assheton =

John Assheton (fl. 1548) was an Anglican priest at "Shiltelington" (perhaps Shillington, Bedfordshire) who is the first recorded English anti-Trinitarian.

Almost nothing is known about Assheton except the record of recantation to Thomas Cranmer in 1548. In his abjuration Assheton details his former objection to the Trinity, to the person and personality of the Holy Spirit, to the pre-existence of Christ, but not to the virgin birth. This then appears to be what would later be called a Socinian position, not an Arian or fully Unitarian one.

Assheton has been identified as the subject of the 1549 work The Fal of the late Arrian by the Catholic historian John Proctor, at least tentatively, by historians including Diarmaid MacCulloch. MacCulloch also describes Assheton (Ashton) as a Cambridge man, with connections to nobility as a chaplain.
