= Humphrey Leech =

English priest

Humphrey Leech (1571 – 18 July 1629) was an English priest, originally of the Church of England, who converted to Catholicism. He is also known as a Jesuit author.

== Life ==
Leech was born at Drayton in Hales, Shropshire. He was educated at Shrewsbury School, and matriculated at Brasenose College, Oxford, on 13 November 1590 aged 19. When his parents died, he went home, and later he continued his studies at Cambridge, where he proceeded B.A. at Queens' College, and M.A. at Emmanuel College. At Oxford, he was incorporated in the degree of M.A. on 23 June 1602.

For a short time Leech was vicar of St. Alkmond's Church, Shrewsbury. On going back to Oxford he was appointed one of the chaplains of Christ Church. A sermon which he preached concerning precepts and evangelical counsels gave offence to the university, and he was summoned before the pro-vice-chancellor, Leonard Hutten, as anti-Calvinist. He was silenced from preaching, and suspended from his commons and function in the college for three months.

After appealing ineffectually to Richard Bancroft, the Archbishop of Canterbury, Leech went to the College of the English Jesuits at St. Omer, and renounced Protestantism. After some time at Arras, he entered the English College, Rome in 1609, under the assumed name Henry Eccles. On 2 May 1610, he took the college oath. He was ordained priest on 21 April 1612, left Rome for England on 22 April 1618, and in the same year entered the Society of Jesus.

In 1621, Leech was at the English Jesuit college at Liège; in the following year, he was on the English mission in the "College of St. Aloysius" (Lancashire district). For some time, he resided, as chaplain, with Mr. Massey of Hooton, Cheshire, where he died on 18 July (O.S.) 1629, aged 58.

== Works ==
Leech was the author of:

- The Triumph of Truth. Or Declaration of the Doctrine concerning Evangelicall Counsayles, lately delivered in Oxford . . . With relation of sundry occurrents, and particularly of D. King, the Vicechancellour, his exorbitant proceedings, with three appendices [Douay], 1609; this work was answered by Daniel Price of Exeter College, Oxford, in his Defence of Truth, and by Sebastian Benefield of Corpus Christi College, Oxford, in his appendix to Doctrinæ Christianæ sex capita, 1610.
- Dutifull Considerations addressed to King James concerning his premonitory Epistle to Christian Princes, St. Omer, 1609. According to George Oliver, Robert Persons had the major role in writing this book.

== Notes ==
Attribution

This article incorporates text from a publication now in the public domain: Lee, Sidney, ed. (1892). "Leech, Humphrey". Dictionary of National Biography. Vol. 32. London: Smith, Elder & Co.
