= John Barnewall (Franciscan friar) =

Irish Franciscan friar (c.1595–c.1650)

John Barnewall, O.F.M. (c. 1595 – c. 1650) was an Irish Franciscan friar. He served as a teacher and lecturer both locally and on the Continent. He was the Minister Provincial of Ireland during the Irish Confederate Wars, due to which position he communicated on Irish affairs with Franciscans on the European mainland, such as the historian, Friar Luke Wadding. He became involved in the conflict, opposing the excommunications issued by the papal nuncio in 1648. He last appears in documents dated July 1649.

== Biography ==
Barnewall was the son of Robert Barnewall, 7th Baron Trimlestown (died 1639), and a brother of Matthias Barnewall, 8th Baron Trimlestown (died 1667). His mother was Genet Talbot, daughter of Thomas Talbot of Dardistown Castle, County Meath. The family was a significant member of the Old English gentry in The Pale of County Meath, having come over from England with King Henry II. One ancestor, John Barnewall, 3rd Baron Trimlestown (died 1538), was Lord Chancellor of Ireland.

John Barnewall went to the Continent and entered the Franciscan Order, going on to receive minor orders and then the subdiaconate at Mechelin, in the then-Spanish Netherlands, in December 1617. No documentation survives, but presumably, he received further Holy Orders during the following months. He defended his theses in Scotist theology at Louvain in 1620, and again in 1627. He is believed to have taught as a lecturer in Germany in 1637, as well as subsequently at Prague, and at Slane in County Meath upon his return to Ireland. Among his students was the historian, Friar Peter Walsh. A contemporary stated that Barnewall taught philosophy and theology at Louvain for eight years prior to his election as Minister Provincial of Ireland at Quin, County Clare, on 15 August 1638.

A letter he wrote to Wadding, dated 1 November 1642, confirms that he was still Minister Provincial at that date. In 1648 he opposed the excommunications issued by papal nuncio, Giovanni Battista Rinuccini, of the members of the Supreme Council of the Confederation of Kilkenny. In July 1649 he was at Kilkenny, where he was joined by the Franciscan guardians of his province in their condemnation of Friar Redmond Caron, who had been appointed Visitor to Ireland by Friar Pierre Marchant, who was a Definitor General of the Order, at the suggestion of James Butler, 1st Duke of Ormonde. There are no further known documentary references to Barnewall after this date.

== See also ==
- Bonaventure Baron
- John Punch
- Edmund Bray
- Froinsias Ó Maolmhuaidh
