= Aodh Mac Cathmhaoil =

Irish Franciscan theologian (1571–1626)

The Most Reverend Aodh Mac Cathmhaoil (anglicised: Hugh McCaghwell) O.F.M.
- Archbishop of Armagh and Primate of All Ireland
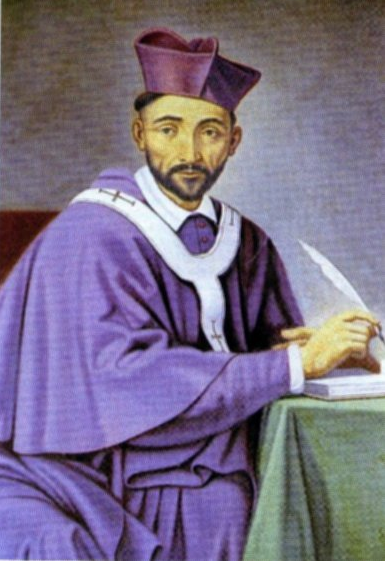
- Aodh "McAingil" MacCathmhaoil (anglicised: Hugh McCaghwell) by an unknown artist, painted sometime between 1596 and 1626.
- Church: Roman Catholic Church
- Archdiocese: Armagh
- Appointed: 17 March 1626
- Term ended: 22 September 1626
- Predecessor: Peter Lombard
- Successor: Hugh O'Reilly

Orders
- Consecration: 7 June 1626 by Gabriel de Trejo

Personal details
- Born: 1571 Dunen (Downpatrick), County Down, Ireland
- Died: 22 September 1626 (aged 55) College of St. Isidore, Ludovisi, Rome
- Buried: Church of St. Isidore, Ludovisi, Rome
- Denomination: Roman Catholic

Aodh Mac Cathmhaoil, O.F.M. (Latin: Hugo Cavellus; anglicised: Hugh MacCaghwell; 1571 – 22 September 1626), was an Irish Franciscan theologian and Archbishop of Armagh. He was known by Irish speakers at Leuven (Louvain) by the honorary name Aodh Mac Aingil ("Mac Aingil" is Irish for "Son of an Angel"), and it was under this title that he published the Irish work Scáthán Shacramuinte na hAthridhe.

== Life ==
Mac Cathmhaoil was born in 1571 at Saul, County Down, and received his earliest education in his native place; he trained at one of the bardic schools still operating in Ulster. He next studied at a famous school in the Isle of Man. On his return to Ireland, he was hired by Hugh O'Neill, The O'Neill, 2nd Earl of Tyrone, as a tutor to his sons Henry and Hugh.

Mac Cathmhaoil was sent by the Earl as special messenger to the Court of Spain to solicit aid for the Ulster forces. During his stay at Salamanca, where the Court then resided, he frequented the schools of the university and took doctor's degrees in divinity. Soon afterwards he entered the Order of Friars Minor. He enjoyed a great reputation as a theologian, and his commentaries on the theologian Duns Scotus (1266–1308) were held in high repute. It was principally due to his great influence at the Spanish Court that the Irish Franciscan College of St. Anthony was founded at Leuven (Louvain).

After his admission into the Order, Mac Cathmhaoil taught for some time in the University of Salamanca. He was appointed as superior and lecturer at St. Anthony's, Leuven, and moved to Belgium. Among his pupils were John Colgan, Patrick Fleming, Hugh Ward, and Antony Hickey. He was summoned to Rome to lecture in the convent of Aracoeli; but his energies were not limited to his work as professor. He was employed by the pope on several commissions.

He carried out a papal mission to Ulster in 1613. Over the next three decades, Leuven produced a remarkable outpouring of Gaelic scholarship and devotional texts in Irish. In scouring the north and midlands of Ireland for all available manuscripts, to write an ecclesiastical history of Ireland, his associates (Mícheál Ó Cléirigh, a trained historian) and Aodh Mac an Bhaird (Hugh Ward) are credited with saving many of the Irish manuscripts that still survive.

Mac Cathmhaoil was elected Definitor General of the Friars Minor of the Strict Observance, which gave him authority over all the friars in Europe who followed that branch of the Reform within Order. In that capacity, he gave substantial help to Friar Luke Wadding in founding and developing the College of San Isidore and Ludovisi's Pontifical Irish College in Rome, for Irish students.

On 17 March 1626, Pope Urban VIII, passing over all the other candidates, appointed Mac Aingil to succeed Peter Lombard as Archbishop of Armagh and Primate of All Ireland. The consecration took place on 7 June, in the church of St. Isidore. Thomas Walsh, Archbishop of Cashel, was consecrated at the same time. The consecrating prelate was Cardinal Gabriel de Trejo, a great friend of the Irish.

Mac Cathmhaoil's health had been much weakened by his duties and the austerities he practised. In making the visitations of the provinces of the Order, he had always travelled on foot. He also spent much time in prayer and fasting. While preparing for his departure, he caught a fever and died in the convent of Aracoeli, aged 54, on 22 September 1626.

Mac Cathmhaoil was buried in the Church of St. Isidore. His friend John O'Neill, 3rd Earl of Tyrone, arranged for a monument to be placed on his grave. The Latin playwright, Nicolaus Vernulæus (1583–1649), delivered a panegyric before the university commemorating the virtues and learning of the archbishop, saying that he was conspicuous for his virtues, and that his holiness of life and profound learning made him the miracle of his time. This address was later published in Cologne in 1657.

== Works ==
Mac Cathmhaoil composed four Christmas carols in Irish, including A Naoidhe Naoimh (O Holy Child).

His major works were in Latin about theology. In his Apologia pro Johanne Duns-Scoto, he engaged in Franciscan defence of Duns Scotus against the Dominican-inspired attacks of Bzovius and Nicolaas Janssenius, claiming Scotus as an Irishman. He also wrote a work in the Irish language, which was printed at the Irish press in the college of St. Anthony's, Leuven, in 1618, entitled Scáthán Shacramuinte na hAthridhe, or Tractatus de poenitentia et indulgentiis, that is, The Mirror of the Sacrament of Penance. (The Latin title did not appear in the text and was used only for cataloguing purposes in Latin libraries.)

- Scáthán Shacramuinte na hAthridhe [or Tractatus de poenitentia et indulgentiis] (Louvain 1618)
- Scoti Commentaria in quatuor libros Sententiarum (2 vols., folio, Antwerp 1620) to this work is prefixed a life of Scotus
- Scoti Commentaria seu Reportata Parisiensia
- Apologiam pro eodum vindicando ab injuriis allatis per Abrahamum Bzovium; against Bzovius.
- Apologiam Apologiae supradictae pro Johanne Scoto Scriptae, in respondet Nicolao Jansenio Belgae Ord. Praedicatorum, Abrahami Bzovii partes suscipienti, no sine gravi Scoti et regni Hiberniae injuria. Prodiit Parisiis sub nomine Hugonis Magnesii discipuli Cavelli apud Michaelum Sonnium, anno 1623 (Paris 1623)
- Quæstiones quodilibetales
- Quæstiones in libros de anima
- Quaestiones in Metaphysicam &c (Venice 1625)

== Sources ==
- (in French) Biography
- Aodh Mac Aingil: Scholar, Poet, Bishop
- The Little Brother from Down – Aodh Mac Aingil as a good Franciscan, by Patrick Conlan, O.F.M., in Seanchas Ard Macha volume 19/2, pp. 63–70, 2002

== Bibliography ==
- Paul Walsh, Gleanings from Irish MSS (1930; 2nd edn. 1933).
- Tomás Ó Cléirigh, Aodh Mac Aingil agus an Scoil Nua-Gheadhilge i Lobháin Louvain (Baile Atha Claith: An Gúm 1936; 1985).
- Canneach Ó Maonaigh, ed., Scáthán Shacramuinte na hAithridhe, Institúid Ardléinn, DIAS 1952 1952, p. 5; Cronin, p. 61.
- Michael Cronin, Translating Ireland: Translations, Languages, Cultures (Cork UP 1996), p. 61.
