= Molloy =

Molloy or O'Molloy is an Irish surname, anglicised from Ó Maolmhuaidh, maolmhuadh meaning 'Proud Chieftain'. (See also Malloy.) They were part of the southern Uí Néill, the southern branch of the large tribal grouping claiming descent from Niall of the Nine Hostages, the fifth-century king who supposedly kidnapped St Patrick to Ireland. They held power over a large part of what is now County Offaly, where the surname is still very common. A second family were the O Maoil Aodha, 'descendant of the devotee of (St) Aodh', from maol, literally 'bald', a reference to the distinctive tonsure sported by early Irish monks. As well as Molloy, this surname has also been anglicised as Mulloy, Malloy, Maloy, 'Miley' and 'Millea'. The name arose in east Connacht, in the Roscommon/east Galway region, and remains numerous there today.

Notable people with the surname include:

- Aaron Molloy (born 1997), Irish footballer
- Albin O'Molloy (died 1223), one of the bishops who officiated at the coronation of King Richard the Lionheart in England in 1189
- Annie E. Molloy (1871–1928), American suffragist, labor leader
- Anthony Molloy (disambiguation), several people
- Bill Molloy (1929–2020), English footballer
- Bobby Molloy (1936–2016), Irish politician
- Charles Molloy (journalist) (died 1767), Irish journalist, political activist and minor playwright
- Charles Molloy (lawyer) (1640–1690), Irish lawyer known as a writer on maritime law
- Donald W. Molloy (born 1946), American judge
- Ellen Molloy (born 2004), Irish association football player
- Francie Molloy (born 1950), Irish politician
- Garret Molloy (played 1990s), Irish rugby player
- Georgiana Molloy (1805–1843), early settler and botanical collector in Western Australia
- Gerald Molloy (1834–1906), Irish theologian and scientist
- Irene Molloy (born 1978), American actress, singer and songwriter of Irish descent
- Isobelle Molloy (born 2000), English actress
- James Lynam Molloy (1837–1909), Irish composer and writer
- Joanna Molloy, American gossip columnist
- John Molloy (1780–1867), early settler in Western Australia
- Leo Molloy, New Zealand businessman
- Leonard Molloy (1861–1937), British Member of Parliament
- Margaret Molloy, Irish businesswoman
- Matt Molloy (born 1947), Irish musician
- Maureen Molloy, Canadian–New Zealand anthropologist
- Mick Molloy (born 1966), Australian comedian, co-host of the Martin/Molloy radio program
- Michael Joseph Molloy (M.J. Molloy) (1914-1994), Irish playwright
- Mike Molloy (born 1940), British journalist, newspaper editor, artist and author
- Mitch Molloy (1965–2024), Canadian ice hockey player
- Myra Molloy (born 1997), Thai singer
- Father Niall Molloy, a priest who died in mysterious circumstances in 1985
- Ryan Molloy (born 1972), British actor, singer and songwriter
- Seaneen Molloy (born 1985), Northern Irish blogger and writer
- Sylvia Molloy (1938–2022), Argentine academic and writer
- Sylvia Clark Molloy (1914–2008), British artist
- Terry Molloy (born 1947), British actor
- Thomas Molloy (1852–1938), Australian politician
- Thomas B. Molloy (1878–1948), Canadian politician
- Thomas Edmund Molloy (1884–1956), American Bishop of Brooklyn 1921–1956
- W. Thomas Molloy (1940–2019), Canadian lawyer and land claim negotiator
- William Molloy (disambiguation), several people

== See also ==
- Mulloy Brothers, Irish balladeer group
