= Saint Patrick's Breastplate =

Old Irish prayer of protection

"Saint Patrick's Breastplate" is an Old Irish prayer of protection of the "lorica" type (hence "Lorica Sancti Patricii", or "The Lorica of Saint Patrick") attributed to Saint Patrick.

Its title is given as Faeth Fiada in the 11th-century Liber Hymnorum that records the text. This has been interpreted as the "Deer's Cry" by Middle Irish popular etymology, but it is more likely a term for a "spell of concealment". It is also known by its incipit (repeated at the beginning of the first five sections) atomruig indiu, or "I bind unto myself today".

== The prayer ==
The prayer is part of the Liber Hymnorum, an 11th-century collection of hymns found in two manuscripts kept in Dublin. It is also present, in a more fragmentary state, in the 9th-century Vita tripartita Sancti Patricii. It was edited in 1888 (Vita Tripartita), in 1898 (Liber Hymnorum), and again published in 1903 in the Thesaurus Paleohibernicus.

The Liber Hymnorum gives this account of how Saint Patrick used this prayer:

Saint Patrick sang this when an ambush was laid against his coming by Loegaire, that he might not go to Tara to sow the faith. And then it appeared before those lying in ambush that they (Saint Patrick and his monks) were wild deer with a fawn following them.

The description concludes "fáeth fiada a hainm", which was interpreted as "Deer's Cry" by the medieval editor of the Liber Hymnorum (hence the connection to the deer metamorphosis), but the Old Irish fáeth fiada properly refers to a "mist of concealment".

The prayer as recorded is dated on linguistic grounds to the early 8th century. John Colgan (1647) attributed the prayer to Saint Evin, the author of the 9th-century Vita Tripartita. It was also Colgan who reported the title of Lorica Patricii. (Note: composuit illum hymnum patrio idiomate conscriptum, qu vulgo feth-fiatha, et ab aliis lorica Patricii appellatur, cited after Petrie 1839, p. 55)

While the text shows pre-Christian influence, it is of undoubted Christian content. Because of this it is also known as the "Lorica of St. Patrick" or as "St. Patrick's Breastplate".

The term Lorica is used of a number of Old Irish prayers, including one attributed to Dallán Forgaill and another to Saint Fursey. They all arose in the context of early Irish monasticism, in the 6th to 8th centuries. At what period the Latin title of Lorica was first applied to them is unclear, but the term is used in the 17th century by John Colgan. The allusion is probably to Ephesians 6:14, where the Apostle bids his readers stand, "having put on the breast-plate of righteousness".

=== Summary ===
The first five sections of the prayer or hymn begin atomruig indiu "I bind unto myself today", (Note: ad-dom-ruig, i.e. ad-ruig "I join" (adjungo) with infixed pronoun dom "to me".(Todd 1864, p. 426)) followed by a list of sources of strength that the prayer calls on for support.

The text is conventionally divided into eleven sections:

1. invocation of the Trinity.
2. invocation of Christ's baptism, death, resurrection, ascension and future return on the last day.
3. invocation of the virtues of angels, patriarchs, saints and martyrs.
4. invocation of the virtues of the natural world: the sun, fire, lightning, wind, etc.
5. invocation of various aspects of God – his wisdom, his eye, his ear, his hand, etc.
6. lists of the things against which protection is required, including false prophets, heathens, heretics, witches and wizards (druids)
7. brief invocation of Christ for protection
8. repeated invocation of Christ to be ever present (Christ with me, Christ before me, Christ behind me, etc.)
9. continuation of the theme of Christ within every man
10. repetition of the first verse
11. short stanza in Latin (invoking Psalm 3:8, "Salvation is the Lord's")

=== Text ===
The text as edited by Stokes 1888, p. 381 is here shown alongside the literal translation due to Todd.

St. Patrick's Breastplate Prayer
The prayer as spoken in Modern English.

[Atomruig indíu niurt trén, togairm Trínóite. Cretim treodataid fóisitin óendatad inDúlemain dail.	1. I bind to myself to-day, The strong power of the invocation of the Trinity: The faith of the Trinity in the Unity; The Creator of the elements.
Atomruig indíu niurt gene Crist conabath]is (Note: Stokes 1888 supplements the missing first lines from the Liber Hymnorum, which has an orthography closer to Middle Irish than the 9th-century Vita.) neurt a croctha conaadnacul. neurt aeiseirgi conafreasgabail. neurt athoiniuda fri brithemnus mbratha.	2. I bind to myself to-day, The power of the Incarnation of Christ, with that of his Baptism, The power of the Crucifixion with that of his Burial, The power of the Resurrection, with the Ascension, The power of the coming of the Sentence of Judgement.
Attomriug [indiu] neurt graid hiruphín inerlattaid aingiul. ifrestal nanarchaingiul. ifrescisin esérgi arcend focraici. inernaigthi uasalthrach. itaircetlaib fáthi. ipreceptaib apstal. inirisib faísmedach. inendccai nóebingen. ingnimaib fer fírioin.	3. I bind to myself to-day, The power of the love of Seraphim, In the obedience of Angels, (In the service of Archangels,); In the hope of Resurrection unto reward, In the prayers of the noble Fathers, In the predictions of the Prophets, In the preaching of Apostles, In the faith of Confessors, In purity of Holy Virgins, In the acts of Righteous Men.
Attomriug [indiu] neurt nime. soillsi gréine. etrochta ésci. [áne thened. déne lóchet.] luathi gaithi. fudomna mara. tairismigi talman. cobsaidi alech.	4. I bind to myself to-day, The power of Heaven, The light of the Sun, (The whiteness of Snow,) (Note: Stokes 1888 renders etrochta ésci as "brightness of Moon".); The force of Fire, The flashing of lightning, The velocity of Wind, The depth of the Sea, The stability of the Earth, The hardness of Rocks.
Attomriug indiu neurt Dé dom lúamairecht. cumachta nDé dom congbáil. cíall nDé domimthús. rosc nDé dom imcaisin. clúas nDé doméistecht. briathar nDé domerlabrai. lám nDé domimdegail. intech nDé domremthechtus. sciath Dé domimdíten. sochraiti Dé domanacul. ar indledaib demna, ar aslagib dualach, ar foirmdechaib acnid, ar cech nduine midúthracair dam icéin, anoccus inuathiud. isochaidi.	5. I bind to myself to-day, The Power of God to guide me, The Might of God to uphold me, The Wisdom of God to teach me, The Eye of God to watch over me, The Ear of God to hear me, The Word of God to give me speech, The Hand of God to protect me, The Way of God to prevent me, The Shield of God to shelter me, The Host of God to defend me, Against the snares of demons, Against the temptations of vices, Against the (lusts) of nature, (Note: Todd's "lusts" is a conjecture; the meaning is unclear. Carey, King of Mysteries (2000) emends "against the tendencies (?) of nature", Borsje 2008, p. 38 conjectures "against the envious ones by nature", connecting foirmdechaib to formtech "envious".); Against every man who meditates injury to me, Whether far or near, With few or with many.
Tochuiriur etrum indíu inna hule neurtasa fri cech neurt namnus nétrocar fristái dom churp ocus domanmain. fri taircetlaib saebfáthe. [fri dubrechtu gentliuchta] fri saebrechtaib [heretecda. fri himcellacht nidlachta. fri brichta] ban ocus goband ocus druád. fri cech fis aracuiliu corp ocus anmain duni.	6. I have set around me all these powers, Against every hostile savage power Directed against my body and my soul, Against the incantations of false prophets, Against the black laws of heathenism, Against the false laws of heresy, Against the deceits of idolatry, Against the spells of women, smiths and druids, Against all knowledge that binds the soul of man.
Crist domimdegail [indiu] ar cech neim ar loscud, ar bádudh, ar guin conimraib ilar fochraici	7. Christ, protect me to-day; Against poison, against burning, Against drowning, against wound, That I may receive abundant reward.
Crist lim. Crist remam. Crist imm degaid. Crist innum. Crist ísum. Crist úasam. Crist dessum. Crist tuathum. Crist illius. Crist ipsius [sic], Crist inerus.	8. Christ with me, Christ before me, Christ behind me, Christ within me, Christ beneath me, Christ above me, Christ at my right, Christ at my left, (Christ in the fort, Christ in the chariot-seat, Christ in the mighty stern.) (Note: the Vita Tripartita is tentatively interpreted by Stokes 1888 as "Christ in breadth, Christ in length, Christ in height(?)". Borsje (2008) gives "Christ where I lie down, Christ where I sit, Christ where I stand".)
Crist hicride cech duine rodomscrútadar. Crist angin cech duine rodomlabradar. Crist iruscc cech duine rodomdecadar. Crist iclúais cech duine rodomcluinedar.	9. Christ in the heart of every man who thinks of me, Christ in the mouth of every man who speaks to me, Christ in the eye of every man that sees me, Christ in the ear of every man that hears me.
[Atomruig indíu niurt trén, togairm Trínóite. Cretim treodataid fóisitin óendatad in Dúlemain dail.]	10. I bind to myself to-day, The strong power of an invocation of the Trinity, The faith of the Trinity in Unity; The Creator of the Elements.
Domini est salus, Domini est salus, Christi est salus, [Salus] tua Domine sit semper nobiscum. Amen.	(Salvation is the Lord's Salvation is the Lord's; Salvation is Christ's; May thy salvation, Lord, be always with us! Amen.)

== Translations and adaptations ==
Inishowen-born Roman Catholic priest John Colgan published an Ecclesiastical Latin literary translation in his Acta Triadis Thaumaturgae (1647).

In the early 19th century, Irish scholars George Petrie and John O'Donovan misanalyzed the first word atomruig as containing Temur, for Temoria or Tara. This is followed by James Clarence Mangan (1803–1849), whose translation begins "At Tarah to-day, in this awful hour, I call on the Holy Trinity!". The literal translation by Todd 1864 recognized this error and gives the translation "I bind to myself to-day".

In 1889, the prayer was adapted into the hymn I Bind Unto Myself Today by C. F. Alexander. A number of other adaptations have been made.

Several different modern English versions of the prayer can be found. For example, some render the beginning atomruig indiu of each major section more freely as "I clasp unto my heart today" rather than the literal "I bind/join to myself today." Various other trivial variants are found, such as the verse "Against spells of women, and smiths, and druids" as "Against spells of witches and smiths and wizards".

There is another class of free or poetic translations which deviate from the original meaning, e.g. replacing the verse "Christ in the fort, Christ in the chariot seat, and Christ in the poop [deck]" with "Christ when I lie down, Christ when I sit down, Christ when I arise."

Scholar of recent Scottish Gaelic literature Ronald Black has praised Father Allan MacDonald's work of Christian poetry Adhram Thu, Adhbhar Mo Bhith ("I Worship You, O Cause of My Being") as, "A powerful hymn of the St. Patrick's Breastplate type."

Catholic prayer cards which have popularized this prayer feature a truncated version in the interest of space.

=== Victorian hymn ===
C. F. Alexander (1818–1895) wrote a hymn based on St. Patrick's Breastplate in 1889 at the request of H. H. Dickinson, Dean of the Chapel Royal at Dublin Castle. Dean Dickinson wrote about this:

I wrote to her suggesting that she should fill a gap in our Irish Church Hymnal by giving us a metrical version of St. Patrick's 'Lorica' and I sent her a carefully collated copy of the best prose translations of it. Within a week she sent me that version which appears in the appendix to our Church Hymnal."

As usual, Alexander wrote the poems only. The music to the hymn was originally set in 1902 by Charles Villiers Stanford for chorus and organ, using two traditional Irish tunes, St. Patrick and Gartan, which Stanford took from his own edition (1895) of George Petrie's Collection of the Ancient Music of Ireland (originally 1855). This is known by its opening line "I bind unto myself today". It is currently included in the Lutheran Service Book (Lutheran Church – Missouri Synod), the English Hymnal, the Irish Church Hymnal and The Hymnal (1982) of the US Episcopal Church. It is often sung during the celebration of the Feast of Saint Patrick on or near 17 March as well as on Trinity Sunday. In many churches it is unique among standard hymns because the variations in length and metre of verses mean that at least three melodic forms are required (one tune which is sung at half-length and in full for depending on the verse length, and one entirely different tune).

=== Musical adaptations ===
- St. Patrick's Breastplate (tune - Tara) in the Irish Church Hymnal (1890) by Irish composer Thomas Richard Gonsalvez Jozé (1853–1924).
- St. Patrick's Breastplate (tune - St. Patrick, and for verse eight - Gartan) (1902), by Irish composer Charles Villiers Stanford (1852–1924) – see above. This is the best known arrangement of this hymn.
- St. Patrick's Breastplate (1912), an arrangement by Charles Villiers Stanford (1852–1924) of his own music to C. F. Alexander's hymn, here for mixed choir, organ, brass, side drum and cymbals.
- St. Patrick's Breastplate (1924), a work for mixed choir and piano by the English composer Arnold Bax (1883–1953).
- Hymn of St. Patrick at Tara (1930), a work for bass soloist, mixed choir and organ by Irish composer Dermot Macmurrough (a.k.a. Harold R. White, 1872–1943) to a poetic interpretation by Olive Meyler.
- St. Patrick's Hymn (1965) by US folk-guitarist John Fahey (1939–2001) on the album "The Transfiguration of Blind Joe Death".
- St. Patrick's Breastplate for SSA voices by English composer Mary Chater (1896-1990).
- Christ Be Beside Me (also Christ Beside Me) and This Day God Gives Me, adaptations by James J. Quinn to the tune of Bunessan, published in his 1969 book New Hymns for All Seasons
- The Deer's Cry (1983) by Irish composer Shaun Davey (born 1948) is based on a translation by Kuno Meyer.
- Arise Today (1995) for choir and organ by US composer Libby Larsen (born 1950).
- In 1997, Irish composer Patrick Cassidy published a new version of Saint Patrick's Breastplate, in his Famine Remembrance album.
- The Deer's Cry (2008), a choral work by Estonian composer Arvo Pärt (born 1935).
- In his 2016 album, "Hymns, Prayers, and Invitations", Rick Lee James opens the album with a modern setting of St. Patrick's Breastplate titled Christ Is Lord (Christ Before Me).
- "The Lorica" is an adaptation of St. Patrick's Breastplate on Canadian singer-songwriter Steve Bell's 2008 Album, Devotion.

Rend Collective's 'The Prayer of St Patrick' is Track 6 of Volume 2 of their 2025 album 'Folk!' is based on St Patrick's Breastplate .

== Modern interpretations ==
In his seminal study 'The Primal Vision: Christian presence Amid African Religion', (SCM Press, London 1963) John Vernon Taylor, later Bishop of Winchester, claimed that St Patrick's Breastplate 'contains all the spiritual awareness of the primal vision and lifts it into the fullness of Christ.' He concludes by quoting the whole prayer in Kuno Meyer's version, exclaiming 'Would that it were translated and sung in every tongue in Africa!'

Since the 1980s, a resurgent interest in "Celtic spirituality" among some Christian authors led to the popularisation of the Lorica as an example of specifically "Celtic". For example, David Adam has written some books about Celtic prayers and spiritual exercises for modern Christians. In one of his books, The Cry Of The Deer, he used the Lorica of St Patrick as a way to Celtic spirituality.

John Davies, Bishop of Shrewsbury, provides a verse-by-verse commentary on the Breastplate in 'A Song for Every Morning: Dedication and Defiance with St Patrick's Breastplate' (Norwich, Canterbury Press 2008), based largely on experience of the struggle against apartheid in South Africa. A foreword by Kathy Galloway, Leader of the Iona Community, notes how the Breastplate brings together the personal and the political in Christian discipleship.
