= Angelus of St. Francis Mason =

English Franciscan friar

Angelus of St. Francis Mason (Spanish: Angelus a San Francisco), (1599 in Wiltshire - 30 Dec 1678 in Douai) was an English Franciscan friar and writer.

== Life ==
He was born Richard Mason in the county of Wiltshire, England, in 1599. Like a number of English Roman Catholics under the Penal laws who desired to enter religious life, he went to Douai in the County of Flanders, then the Spanish Netherlands. There he entered the Order of Friars Minor, being clothed in the habit and given his new name. He was professed in 1625, and ordained to the priesthood four years later.

There is the suggestion in some documents of the Order that he served for a time in Ireland after this, possibly himself being of Irish descent.

Mason rapidly became eminent in the Order, being created a Doctor of Divinity. He was appointed successively to the high administrative offices of Definitor, Guardian and Visitor to the Franciscan province of Brabant. He was elected Minister Provincial of the English province of the Franciscan Order in 1659. In that office, he visited Paris in an unsuccessful attempt to obtain permission for the settlement there of a colony of English Franciscan Sisters from their convent in Nieuwpoort in Flanders, where he had served as their confessor. From 1662-75 he lived in England, as domestic chaplain to Lord Henry Arundell, 3rd Baron Arundell of Wardour. After this time he retired to the friary at Douai, where he died on 30 December 1678.

== Works ==
Mason wrote a number of original works, in addition to compiling devotional manuals. The latter include his Sacrarium privilegiorum quorundam Seraphico P. S. Francisco ... indultorum (Douai, 1636), a guide to the indulgences granted to members of the Franciscan Order. He later wrote the Manuale Tertii Ordinis S. Francisci (Douai, 1643), a commentary and meditations on the Rule of the Third Order of St. Francis, in which he gives guidance to Franciscan tertiaries on their way of life. This he soon translated into English as The Rule of Penance of the Seraphical Father St. Francis (Douai, 1644).

In 1649 he published Certamen Seraphicum Provinciae Angliae pro Sancta Dei Ecclesia (Douai, 1649), a review of distinguished English Franciscan martyrs and polemical writers. In 1656 he published Apologia pro Scoto Anglo (Douai, 1656) which focussed on the establishment (against John Colgan) of the thesis that Duns Scotus was not a Scotsman, but an Englishman.

In 1670 he published Liturgical Discourse of the Holy Sacrifice of the Mass (s. 1, 1670, dedicated to his benefactor, Henry, Lord Arundell of Wardour). This was abridged in the Holy Altar and Sacrifice Explained which Pacificus Baker published at the request of Bishop James Talbot in London in 1768.
