= Mulloy =

Mulloy may refer to:

== People ==
- Daniel Mulloy (born 1977), British artist and filmmaker
- Gardnar Mulloy (1913–2016), American tennis player
- Lorne W. R. Mulloy (1879–1932), Canadian soldier, professor, and lawyer
- Lucy Mulloy, British screenwriter and film director
- Melissa Mulloy (born 1978), American sport shooter
- Michel Mulloy (born 1954), American priest of the Catholic Church
- Phil Mulloy (1948–2025), British animator
- Sheila Mulloy (1922–2013), Irish writer and historian
- Thomas Mulloy, English footballer in the 1920s
- William Mulloy (1917–1978), American anthropologist
- William Theodore Mulloy (1892–1959), American Roman Catholic bishop

== Other uses ==
- Mulloy Brothers, an Irish ballad group
- Mulloy, Oregon, an unincorporated community in Washington County, Oregon, United States
- Biblioteca William Mulloy, a research library in Chilean Polynesia

== See also ==
- Molloy (disambiguation)
