= John Punch =

John Punch may refer to:

- John Punch (slave) (1605–?), believed to be the first African slave in what would later be the United States
- John Punch (theologian) (1603–1661), Irish theologian
