= St Anthony's College, Leuven =

Former college in Leuven, Belgium

Irish College of St Anthony
- Coláiste Naomh Antaine i Lobháin / An Coláiste Éireannach, Lobháin
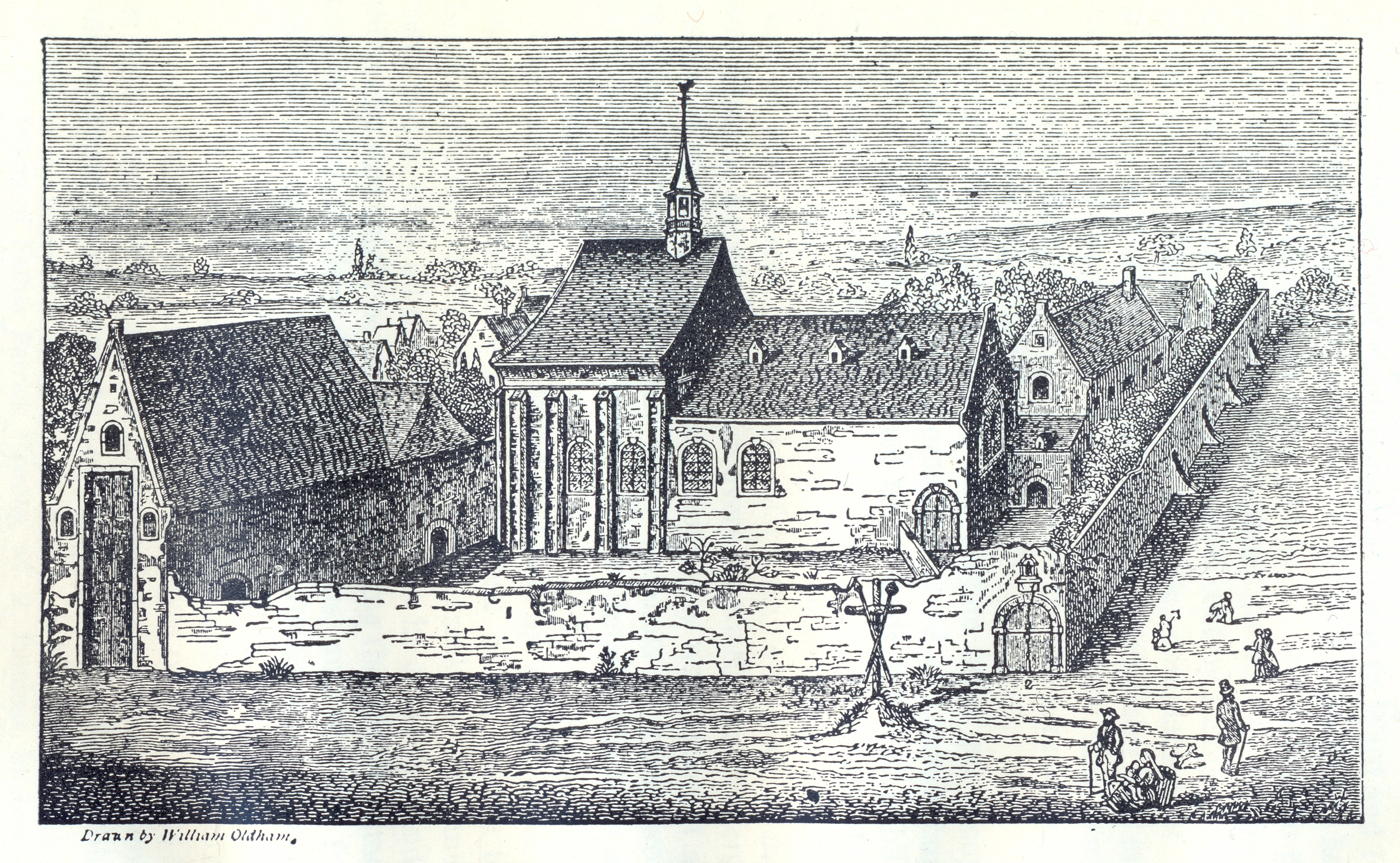
- A view of the college as it was in the early 18th century by William Oldham
- Latin: Hibernorum Collegii S. Antonii de Padua Lovanii
- Other names: The Irish College in Leuven
- Motto: Dochum Glóire Dé agus Ónóra na hÉireann.
- Motto in English: For the Glory of God and the Honour of Ireland
- Type: Franciscan house of studies
- Active: 1607–1983
- Religious affiliation: Catholic
- Academic affiliations: Old University of Leuven, Catholic University of Leuven, Katholieke Universiteit Leuven
- Location: Leuven, Belgium; 50°52′34″N 4°41′49″E
- Campus: Urban
- Website: irishcollegeleuven.eu

The Irish College of St Anthony, in Leuven, Belgium (Irish: Coláiste na nGael i Lobháin, Latin: Hibernorum Collegii S. Antonii de Padua Lovanii, French: Collège des Irlandais à Louvain and Dutch: Iers College Leuven), was a centre of Irish learning on the European continent founded in the early 17th century. The college was dedicated to St. Anthony of Padua.

== History ==
The college was founded in 1607 by Florence Conry, Archbishop of Tuam, and Irish Franciscan Hugh MacCaghwell (Lecturer at the University of Salamanca, later Archbishop of Armagh), with the support of Philip III of Spain, as an exile institution for the training of Irish Franciscan priests. A bull of foundation was acquired from Pope Paul V on 3 April 1607. The foundation stone of the current building was laid in 1617. Funding came from Isabella Clara Eugenia, wife and co-ruler with Archduke Albert. It was one of the main centres of Irish learning and the preservation of Irish intellectual culture during penal times. The Irish language was used in the college, and Irish was read during meals. The monks preserved and translated many Irish language documents.

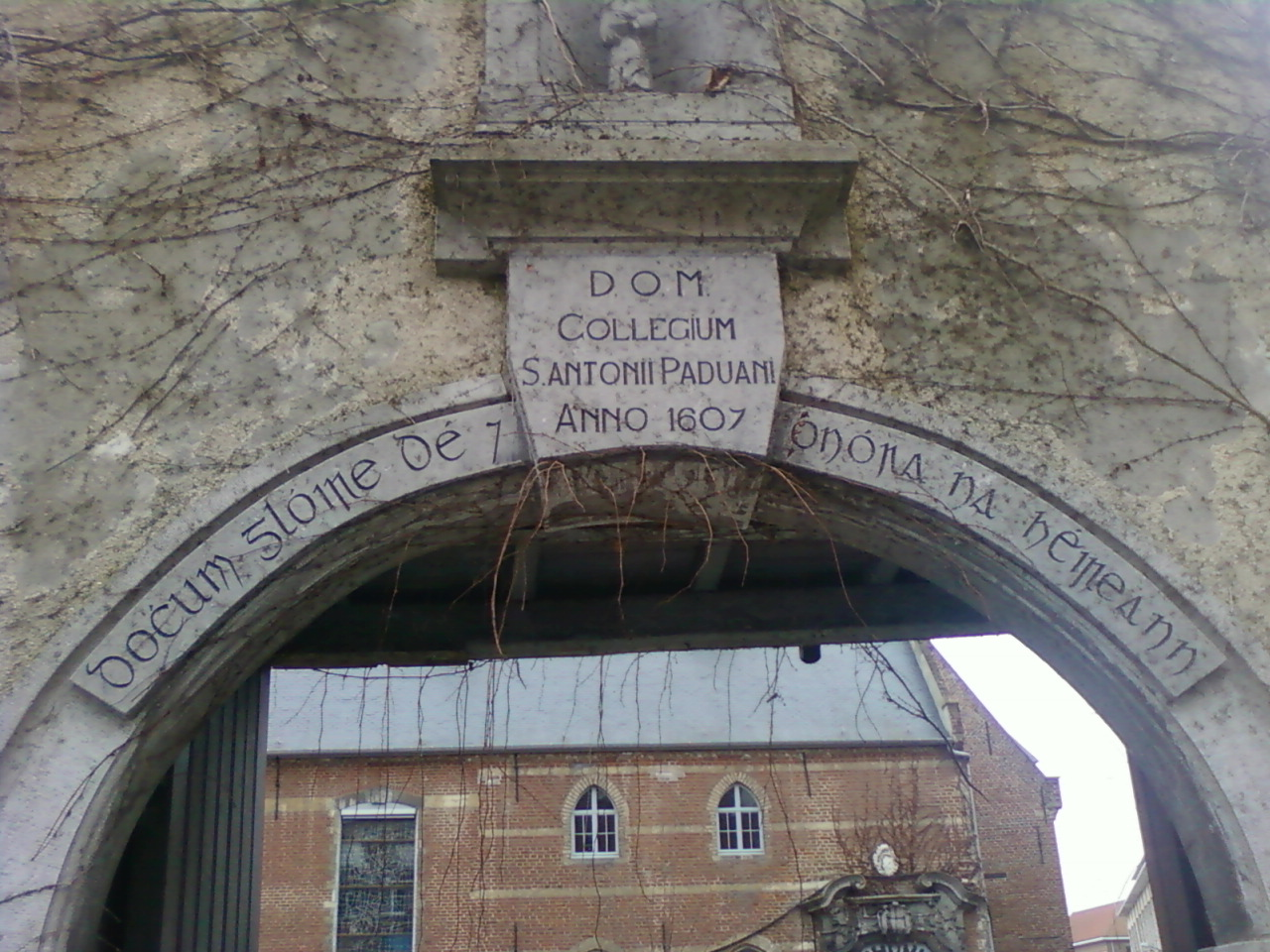
Entrance to the college as restored after World War II. The inscription reads 'Dochum Glóire Dé agus Onóra na hÉireann' ('For the Glory of God and the Honour of Ireland')

Following the Flight of the Earls, many of the O'Neill and O'Donnell clans stayed in Louvain. In October 1610, two young O'Donnell nobles, Hugh Albert, son of the Earl of Tyrconnell, and Hugh, son of Cathbarr, were sheltered at the college by MacCaghwell. 7 O'Donnell clan members were also buried there.

=== The College of the Immaculate Conception, Prague ===
College of the Immaculate Conception, Prague was founded in 1629 by Irish Franciscan priests from Louvain, including Patrick Fleming and Malachy Fallon (both Professors in Louvain). In 1787 following the suppression by the Habsburgs, of the College of the Immaculate Conception, Prague, students were transferred to Louvain.

=== The Pastoral Irish College, Louvain ===
The Pastoral Irish College, Louvain (French: Collège pastoral irlandais / Collège des Hibernois / Latin: Collegium pastorale Hibernorum) established in 1622, by the archbishop of Dublin Eugene Matthews (and sanctioned in 1624 by a papal charter and financially by Pope Urban VII), was under the supervision of the Franciscans, and affiliated to the university. It was based in Rue des Orphelins, Presidents/Rectors of the Irish Pastoral college Louvain include Nicholas Aylmer, John Sullivan (from Kerry who set up a bursary for Louvain), Florence Sullivan and Dr. John Kent (served from 1732-1778). The Pastoral College closed in 1795 following French occupation. Thomas Stapleton also served as Rector of the pastoral college as well as of the University of Louvain.

=== The Irish Dominican College, Louvain ===
The Irish Dominican College, Louvain (Irish Dominican College of Holy Cross), founded in 1620's, a priory built in 1650 and chapel in 1659, also in 1659 the College was fully incorporated into the University of Louvain. With the other colleges it was also suppressed in 1795, the property sold and buildings destroyed in 1799–1800, the street name in La Rue des Dominicains Irlandais now in Flemish Ierse Predikherenstraat (Irish Preachers' Street) is all that remains.

=== Re-establishment of the Irish College, Leuven ===
Closed down by the French invaders on 8 January 1797, the buildings were sold by public auction, later they were bought by the guardian Fr. James Gowan in 1822, since the university was closed he disposed of it in 1830 becoming a boys' school for the duration of the 19th century. In 1925 the Irish Franciscans again acquired the site (technically it was owned until 1973 by the Catholic University to issues of foreign organisation ownership), it needed repairs since it had been damaged during the great war, helped by Rev James J. Ryan and his friend from his University days Cardinal Désiré-Joseph Mercier, and helped by funding from Irish-born American philanthropist Marquis Martin Maloney. In 1927 the college reopened.

From the 1920's, many Irish students would have studied in St. Anthony's College, taking a undergraduate degree in University College Galway, before moving to Louvain.

Following the German invasion in 1940, students were transferred to the Franciscan (St. Anthony's,) College in Galway, where an extra wing was built to accommodate them (and students who would have otherwise gone to Rome) and the Louvain college was entrusted to Belgian friars, with the Irish province resuming control in 1948, using it for their own educational purposes until 1983.

2007 saw a celebration of the 400th anniversary of the foundation of St Anthony's, the Irish Franciscan College, in Louvain, with events in Ireland and Leuven to commemorate it. A commemorative stamp was issued by the Irish post office to celebrate the 400th anniversary.

A project to provide online access to the Irish manuscripts of the Irish College in Leuven is a collaboration between the Center for Irish Studies (KU Leuven), KBR, the Irish Embassy in Belgium and Irish Script on Screen (Dublin Institute for Advanced Studies).

== The Leuven Institute of Ireland in Europe/Irish College Leuven ==
in 1984 the Irish Franciscans, before leaving the college, established the Leuven Institute of Ireland in Europe, a not for profit organisation which operates the former college as an international residential centre for education, training and research in European and international affairs, in fulfilment of its mission to maximise promotion, positive exposure and opportunities for the island of Ireland. In keeping with its local identity, The Leuven Institute for Ireland in Europe uses the familiar brand of Irish College Leuven.

In 2010, a collaboration between the Institute and the Catholic University of Leuven launched The Leuven Centre for Irish Studies (LCIS) The Irish College in Leuven is also the centre for the European Federation of Associations and Centres of Irish Studies (EFACIS). Part of the mission is to promote Irish Culture, and as a result, it hosts performances, concerts, recitals and exhibitions, one of the initiatives is the Writer in residence at the Irish College.

== St. Anthony's Parish - English-Speaking Chaplaincy ==
In 1972 the Irish Franciscans began to minister to English speakers in the Kraainem parish in Brussels, following the accession of Ireland and the UK to the EEC, and a request from Cardinal Suenans to the Irish Franciscans, already present at the Irish College, who appointed Fr. Michael Bailey to a new English-speaking chaplaincy in 1973. The order purchased a house on Avenue l’Oiseau Bleu as the chaplain's residence and parish centre, and in 1983 bought the present property which is now the St. Anthony's Parish. Edmund Dougan OFM, (former professor and guardian of the Irish College) served as Parish Priest at St. Anthony's from 1987 to 1995. The order continued its ministry of the Parish until 2024, when it permanently withdrew. The Parish remains in operation under a new order.

== People associated with the College ==
=== Important works published by scholars associated with the College ===
Amongst the most notable Irish scholars associated with the college were, in alphabetical order: Bishop Dominic de Burgo (Burke), John Colgan, Aodh Mac Cathmhaoil (also known as Aodh Mac Aingil), Mícheál Ó Cléirigh, Giolla Brighde Ó hEódhasa (also known as Bonaventura Ó hEodhasa) and Flaithrí Ó Maol Chonaire.

=== Notable staff and alumni ===
The head of the college was the Guardian the equivalent of a college rector or president, with the Vicar being the effective deputy.

- Valentine Browne, OFM, theologian and teacher
- Francis De Burgo (Burke) served as Bishop of Kilmacduagh
- Edmund Bourke OP, was regent of the Irish Dominican College in Louvain
- Raymond Caron (also known as Raymond Redmond) O.M.R. (1605–1666), served as Professor in Louvain, he was a Recollect friar and author.
- Denis Conway (1722–1796), Bishop of Limerick (1779-1796)
- Malachy Fallon, Professor of Theology, helped set up the College of the Immaculate Conception in Prague in 1629.
- Patrick Fleming, a former student, and professor in Louvain, helped set up the college in Prague in 1629.
- Thomas Fleming Archbishop of Dublin.
- Nicholas French (c. 1604–1678), founder of the Irish Catholic Confederation
- Antony Hickey (1586–1641)
- Walter Blake Kirwan (1754–1805) studied in Louvain, following ordination he held the chair of Moral and Natural Philosophy, he converted to Anglicanism becoming Dean of Killala and a noted preacher.
- Aodh Buidhe Mac an Bhaird/Hugh Ward DD (c.1593–1635), first professor of divinity and later guardian(rector) of the college in Louvain, from 1626, established an Irish press in St. Anthony's.
- Heber MacMahon, Bishop of Clogher
- John Evangelist McBride OFM (1903-1991), Bishop of Kokstad, South Africa (1951-1978)
- Donatus Mooney, the first guardian of the college
- Wilfrid Napier OFM (1943- ), Cardinal, Archbishop of Durban (1992-2021)
- Mícheál Ó Cléirigh (c.1590–1643), chief author of the Annals of the Four Masters
- Giolla Brighde Ó hEódhasa/Bonaventure O'Hussey MA(Douai), guardian died in office in 1614
- Colman O'Shaughnessy OP, dominican friar, professor of theology, became Bishop of Ossory
- John (O') Sullivan (1633-1699), rector of the University of Louvain (1690-1691), president of Irish Pastoral College (1672-1697), president of the College de Drieux, Louvain (1692–95).
- John Punch, Franciscan scholastic philosopher and theologian.
- Brendan Jennings OFM, first guardian following the reopening of the Irish College in 1927.
- Edmund Dougan OFM, a former professor of sociology and Guardian (1957–63) of the Irish College, later serving as Parish Priest at St. Anthonys from 1987 to 1995.
- James Rice, count of the Holy Roman empire, was involved in a plot to escape Queen Marie-Antoinette during the French Revolution.
- James J. Ryan J.C.B. (Lovan.), studied at Louvain, served as President of St. Patrick's College, Thurles, supported and funded the re-purchasing of property in 1923 for the Irish college for its reopening in 1927.
- John G. Young, MA, PhD, Bishop of Limerick, attended the secular/pastoral college.

=== Buried at the College ===
A number of people who are buried at the college include founder Archbishop Florence Conry, Bishop Dominic de Burgo and Dominic Lynch. Others include Captain Sorley MacDonnell (1586-1632), Flemish priest Francis Bougher (died 1706) and chronicler Michael O'Clery.

Many Gaelic nobles of the exiled O'Neill and O'Donnell clans are buried at the college, including Rosa O’Doherty, wife of Owen Roe O’Neill, and Nuala O'Donnell, sister to Hugh Roe O'Donnell.

Rev. Dr. Hugh Ward is also buried in the college.

== See also ==
- Irish College
- List of colleges of Leuven University
- Sant’Isidoro a Capo le Case (Franciscan College in Rome)
- College of the Immaculate Conception, Prague (Franciscan College founded by priests from Leuven in Prague then Bohemia)
- Irish College in Paris now run similarly as the Irish Cultural Centre and Irish Chaplaincy in Paris
