= Francis Porter =

Irish professor, lecturer, and writer

Francis Porter, O.F.M., (fl. c. 1650 – 7 April 1702) was a professor, lecturer, and President, of the Irish College of St. Isidore, Rome.

He was a native of County Meath.

== Works ==
Porter was author of the following Latin works:

- Securis Evangelica ad Hæresis radices posita, ad Congregationem Propagandæ Fidei, Rome, 1674, second edition dedicated to Roger Palmer, 1st Earl of Castlemaine
- Palinodia religionis prætensæ Reformatæ, Rome, 1679; dedicated to Cardinal Alderano Cybo.
- Compendium Annalium Ecclesiasticorum Regni Hiberniæ, exhibens brevem illius descriptionem et succinctam Historiam, 1690; dedicated to Pope Alexander VIII. It contains an epistle to the author, by Francesco Eschinardi, a Jesuit, on errors in maps of Ireland. Porter drew heavily on James Ussher and James Ware. The last section of the Appendix contained contemporary history down to the end of 1689, with an account of the siege of Derry (taken from letters written in May, July, and September 1689), and of the Patriot parliament at Dublin. Porter concluded with blaming Martin Luther for all the evils of Ireland.
- Systema Decretorum Dogmaticorum … in quo insuper recensentur præcipui cujuslibet Sæculi, errores, adversi Impugnatores orthodoxi; item Recursus et Appellationes hactenus ad sedem Apostolicam habitæ, cum notis historicis et copiosis indicibus, Avignon, 1693; dedicated to Cardinal Fabrizio Spada.
- Opusculum contra vulgares quasdam Prophetias de Electionum [sic] Summorum Pontificum, S. Malachiæ … hactenus falso attributas, Gallice primum editum, nunc novis supplementis auctum et in Latinum idioma translatum: adjunctis celebrium Authorum [sic] reflectionibus et judiciis de Abbatis Joachimi Vaticiniis, ejusque Spiritu Prophetico, Rome, 1698.

== See also ==
- Antony Hickey
- Aodh Buidhe Mac an Bhaird
