= College of the Immaculate Conception, Prague =

Former college in Prague, Czech Republic

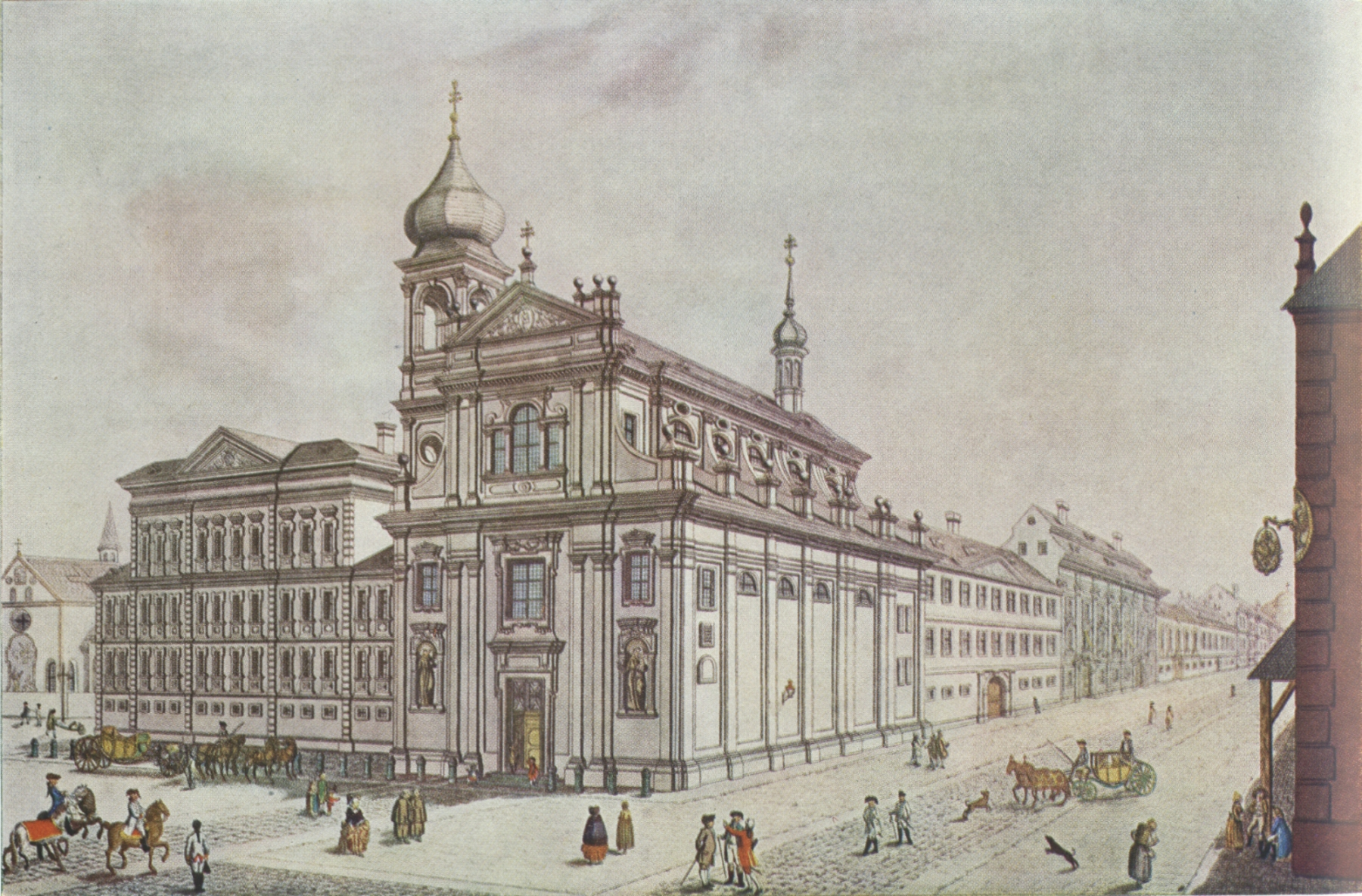
- The college complex in 1785
- Type: Seminary
- Active: 1629–1786
- Founders: Patrick Fleming OFM
- Parent institution: St Anthony's College, Leuven
- Religious affiliation: Roman Catholic, Irish Franciscans

College of the Immaculate Conception, Prague, was a Franciscan College, founded in 1629 by Irish Franciscan priests from Louvain. Instrumental in its foundation was its first Rector Patrick Fleming from Leuven, also involved was Fr Malachy Fallon, the Professor of Theology in Louvain, who persuaded the Holy Roman Emperor Ferdinand II to permit foundation of an Irish College in Prague. The establishment was seen as being part of a re-catholicisation of Bohemia, by the Habsburgs, but also to provide clergy for Ireland. Shortly after its foundation, Bohemia was invaded during the thirty-years war, Rector of the college Fleming and another Irish friar Mathew Hoare were captured and murdered by Calvinists.

From the legacy of General Walter Butler, a Chapel was built. In 1700 Count Sternburg (Šternberkové), of the Bohemian Noble family, built and stocked a library (from his brothers collection).

The college was suppressed in 1786 by Habsburg Emperor Joseph II, following his Secularization Decrees. In 1787 Students transferred to the Irish College, St Anthony's College, Leuven.

Most of the house and the church are still standing on Hybernská (Hibernian) Street, in Prague, Czech Republic. The building became a Tax office. Later, the budiling complex served various government offices until 2014. In 2015, the Czech state sold the complex, and in 2022 the new owner renovated part of the complex into modern offices. The second part of the complex has been under reconstruction since 2025 and is to be transformed into an office and retail center. The whole complex is protected as a cultural monument.

== People Associated with the College ==
- Fr. James Taafe as papal nuncio to Ireland
- Fr. Francis Harold O.F.M, a historian who was professor of theology in prague
- Bishop Anthony MacGeoghegan OFM, served as bishop of Meath and Clonmacnoise
- Fr. Proinsias Ó Doibhlin, Franciscan friar poet and scribe, also lectured in Prague.
- Bishop James Louis O'Donel OFM, taught theology and philosophy in Prague prior to going to Newfoundland.
- Fr. Anthony O’Neill as guardian in Armagh
- Fr. Philip O’Reilly O.F.M., guardian of the Irish Franciscan house in Prague
- Bishop Thaddeus Francis O'Rourke, STL, O.F.M. served as Bishop of Killala
- Anthony Bruodin, Irish Franciscan Friar and theologian who taught in Prague

== See also ==
- St Anthony's College, Leuven (Franciscan College in Louvain/Leuven)
- Sant’Isidoro a Capo le Case (Franciscan College in Rome)
- Irish College (Irish Colleges on the Continent)
