= Ó Maolmhuaidh =

Maolmhuaidh is an Irish surname, generally anglicised as Molloy or Mulloy. Like other Irish surnames, Maolmhuaidh is patronymic. The male version is Ó Maolmhuaidh with the name in the genitive or possessive case preceded by ("ó" or “ua” meaning "grandson or descendant"); the female versions is Ní Mhaolmhuaidh ("ní" a contraction of “iníon” meaning "daughter”, there is no equivalent of Mrs as women in gaelic society retained their maiden names after marriage); the family or house name is Uí Mhaolmhuaidh “uí” being the plural of “ua” or “ó”.

== Ó Maolmhuaidh Fir Cell ==
The Uí Maolmhuaidh of Fir Cell (men of the churches, in what is now County Offaly) claimed descent from the southern Uí Néill. The 16th-century mercenary, Captain Greene O'Mulloy, was of this family.

== Ó Maoil Aodha Oirthir Connachta ==
The Uí Maoil Aodha ("descendant of the devotee of (St.) Aodh") family lived in east Connacht and is now found as both Mullee and Molloy.

== Ó Maolmhaodhóg Tir Connall ==
The Uí Maolmhaodhóg ("descendant of the devotee of (St.) Maodhóg") surname is now usually rendered as Mulvogue or Logue, but sometimes Molloy, particularly around the Glenties area of County Donegal.

== Instances ==
The 1890 registration of births found bearers of the surname concentrated in counties Donegal, Dublin, Galway, and Mayo.

== Notables of the name ==
- Ailbe Ua Maíl Mhuaidh (died 1223), bishop of Ferns
- Froinsias Ó Maolmhuaidh (c.1606-77), Franciscan friar, theologian and grammarian
- James Lynam Molloy (1837-1909), songwriter
- William Theodore Mulloy (1892–1959), bishop of Covington
- Gardnar Mulloy (born 1913), former tennis player
- M.J. Molloy (1917-1994), farmer and playwright
- William Mulloy (1917–1978), American anthropologist.
- Sheila Mulloy, writer and historian.
- James T. Molloy (1936–2011) Doorkeeper of the House of Representatives
- Bobby Molloy (born 1936), retired TD
- Phil Mulloy (born 1948), British animator.
- The Mulloy Brothers, traditional Irish ballad group
- Daniel Mulloy (born 1977), British artist and filmmaker
- Trevor Molloy (born 1977), Irish professional footballer
- Lucy Mulloy (born 1979), screenwriter and film director
- Aaron Molloy (born 1997), Irish professional footballer
