= Acta Sanctorum Hiberniae =

Book of Irish saints

Acta Sanctorum Hiberniae is the abbreviated title of a celebrated work on the Irish saints by the Franciscan, John Colgan (Leuven, 1645).

Aided by Hugh Ward, Stephen White, Míchél Ó Cléirigh, and Henry Fitzsimon, White, Fitzsimon, and Thomas Messingham were "forerunners in searching for manuscripts containing Lives of Irish saints."

Colgan sedulously collected enormous material for the Lives of the Irish Saints, and at length, after thirty years of sifting and digesting his materials, put to press his Acta Sanctorum Hiberniae, a portion of the expense of which was defrayed by Hugh O'Reilly.

The first volume, covering 270 lives of Irish saints (except Brigid and Patrick) for the months of January, February, and March, was intended to be the third volume of the Ecclesiastical Antiquities of Ireland, but only one volume was printed at Leuven in 1645.

A replica was produced in Dublin in 1948.
