= The Devout Communicant =

The Devout Communicant may refer to:

- The Devout Communicant, an 18th-century Franciscan book by Pacificus Baker
- "The Devout Communicant", a 19th-century Anglican hymn by Gerard Moultrie
