= John Punch (theologian) =

Irish philosopher and theologian

- Born: 1603; County Cork, Ireland, Kingdom of Ireland
- Died: 1661 (aged 57–58); Paris, France
- Education: St Anthony's College, Louvain; College of St. Isidore, Rome
- Occupations: Friar, priest, philosopher and theologian

John Punch (or John Ponce or, in the Latin form, Johannes Poncius) (1603–1661) was an Irish Franciscan priest, and a scholastic philosopher and theologian.

Punch was ultimately responsible for the now classic formulation of Ockham's Razor, in the shape of the Latin phrase entia non sunt multiplicanda praeter necessitatem, "entities are not to be multiplied unnecessarily." His formulation was slightly different: Non sunt multiplicanda entia sine necessitate. Punch did not attribute this wording to William of Ockham, but instead referred to the principle as a "common axiom" (axioma vulgare) used by the Scholastics.

== Life ==
His name was John Punch, but he is often known as "Ponce", which was a derivation of the Latin form of his surname: Poncius. At an early age, he travelled to Belgium and entered the novitiate of the Irish Franciscans in St. Antony's College, Louvain. He studied philosophy at Cologne, began the study of theology in Louvain, under Hugh Ward and John Colgan, was called by Luke Wadding to Rome, and admitted 7 September 1625 into the College of St. Isidore, which had just been founded for the education of Irish Franciscan friars. After receiving his degrees he was appointed to teach philosophy and later, theology in St. Isidore's. He lectured afterwards at Lyons and Paris, where he was held in great repute for his learning.

Punch succeeded Martin Walsh in governing Ludovisi College in Rome (Pontifical Irish College) for the education of Irish secular priests; and for some time he filled the position of superior of St. Isidore. He had a passionate love of his country and was an active agent in Rome of the Irish Confederate Catholics. When dissensions arose among the Confederates, and when Richard Bellings, secretary to the Supreme Council, published his Vindiciæ (Paris, 1652), attacking the Irish Catholics who remained faithful to the nuncio, Father Punch promptly answered with his "Vindiciae Eversae" (Paris, 1652). He had already warned the Confederates not to trust the Royalists. In a letter (2 July 1644) to the agent of the Catholics, Hugo de Burgo, he says:

"the English report that the king will not give satisfaction to our commissioners (from the Confederates) though he keep them in expectation and to delay them for his own interest".

== Works ==
In 1643 he published in Rome his Cursus philosophiæ. Some of his opinions were opposed by Mastrius, and Punch replied in Appendix apologeticus (Rome, 1645), in which he says that although he accepts all the conclusions of Duns Scotus, he does not feel called upon to adopt all Scotus's proofs. Mastrius acknowledged the force of Punch's reasoning and admitted that he had shed light on many philosophical problems. In 1652, Punch published "Integer cursus theologiæ" (Paris). These two works explain with great clearness and precision the teaching of the Scotistic school. In 1661, he published at Paris his great work, "Commentarii theologici in quatuor libros sententiarum". Hurter called it Punch's opus rarissimum.

Punch also assisted Luke Wadding in editing the works of Scotus. Wadding says that he was endowed with a powerful and subtle intellect, a great facility of communicating knowledge, a graceful style, and that though immersed in the severer studies of philosophy and theology he was an ardent student of the Classics.

His other works are:

- "Judicium doctrinæ SS. Augustini et Thomæ", Paris, 1657;
- "Scotus Hiberniae restitutus", in answer to Angelus of St. Francis Mason, who claimed Scotus as an Englishman;
- "Deplorabilis populi Hibernici pro religione, rege et libertate status" (Paris, 1651).

== See also ==
- John Barnewall
- Valentine Browne

== Sources ==
- Wadding-Sbaralea, Scriptores Ordinis (Rome, 1806);
- Bibliotheca universa Franciscana (Madrid, 1732);
- Ware's Works, ed. Harris (Dublin, 1764);
- Smith, The Ancient and Present State of the County and City of Cork (Cork, 1815);
- Brenan, The Ecclesiastical History of Ireland (Dublin, 1864);
- Von Hurter, Nomenclator literarius theologiae catholicae, theologos exhibens aetate, natione, disciplinis distinctos, 5 Bände, 1871–1886 (1903–1913)
- Contemporary History of Affairs in Ireland, etc., ed. Gilbert (Dublin, 1880);
- History of the Irish Confederation and War in Ireland, ed. Gilbert (Dublin, 1891);
- Holzapfel, Geschichte des Franziskanerordens (Freiburg, 1908);
- Patrem, Tableau synoptique de l'histoire de l'Ordre Séraphique (Paris, 1879);
- Allibone, Dictionary of Authors (Philadelphia);
- Manuscripts preserved in the library of Franciscan Convent, Dublin, and at St Isidore's College, Rome
