= Raymond Caron =

17th century Irish Franciscan friar and author

Raymond Caron, (also known as Raymond Redmond) (1605 at Athlone, Ireland – 1666 at Dublin) was an Irish Recollect Franciscan friar and author.

== Life ==
Entering the Franciscan friary in his native town, he there made his preliminary studies, after which he studied philosophy at Drogheda. Subsequently, he left Ireland and studied theology at Salzburg and at the Franciscan college at the Catholic University of Louvain. At the latter place he was, immediately after his ordination, appointed professor of theology, and in that capacity maintained the reputation he had earned as a student.

Caron was sent to Ireland in April 1649 by Pierre Marchant, who was a Definitor General of the Order, as a Visitor to the Franciscan Province of Ireland. The 1913 Catholic Encyclopedia attributes his appointment to the suggestion of James Butler, 1st Duke of Ormonde; Franciscan scholar Anselm Faulkner suggests that Bishop of Kilmacduagh Hugh Burke and the friar Anthony Gearnon may also have been involved.

He took up residence at the Franciscan friary at Kilkenny, and plunged at once into the strife of faction then raging there. Opposing both the papal nuncio, Giovanni Battista Rinuccini, and Owen Roe O'Neill, he sought to bring all to the side of the Duke of Ormonde, and imprisoned the members of his own Order at Kilkenny who refused to adopt his views.

This act made him so unpopular that his life was in danger, and he had to be protected by the Earl of Castlehaven at the head of an armed force. This conduct earned for him the character of a loyalist; but it brought on him the condemnation of John Barnewall, the Minister Provincial of Ireland, together with the guardians of the various communities of friars on the island. For a time he was under ecclesiastical censure.

During the rule of the Puritans Caron remained abroad, but returned to England at the Restoration of 1660, and lived there for several years. He was throughout a supporter of the Duke of Ormonde and his policy.

He returned to Ireland where he died in Dublin in 1666.

== Works ==
In 1653, Caron published at Antwerp a work Roma triumphans Septicollis, in defence of Catholic doctrine.

He also wrote two works in defence of Peter Walsh's History of the Irish Remonstrance, namely:

- Loyalty asserted, and the late Remonstrance of the Irish Clergy and Laity confirmed and proved by the authority of Scripture, Fathers, etc. (London, 1662)
- Remonstrantia Hibernorum contra Lovanienses (London, 1665)
