= San Isidoro =

San Isidoro may refer to:

- Basilica of San Isidoro, Leon, Spain
- Sant'Isidoro a Capo le Case, Rome, Italy
