= Molloy (disambiguation) =

Molloy is a surname.

Molloy may also refer to:

- Molloy (novel), a novel by Samuel Beckett
- Molloy University, a private Catholic university in Rockville Centre, New York, United States
- Archbishop Molloy High School, a co-educational, college preparatory, Catholic school in Queens, New York City
- Molloy Deep, the deepest point in the Arctic Ocean
- Molloy (TV series)
- Molloy (Abandoned Village In Kerguelen Islands)

== See also ==
- Mulloy (disambiguation)
