= Froinsias Ó Maolmhuaidh =

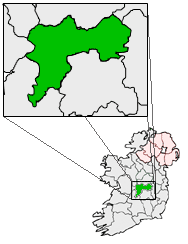
Ó Maolmhuaidh was most likely from the district of Firceall in what is now central Co. Offaly.

Froinsias Ó Maolmhuaidh (anglicised as Francis Molloy; c. 1606–1677) was a Franciscan friar, theologian and grammarian, author of the first published grammar of the Irish language written in Latin.

== Biography ==
=== Early life ===
Ó Maolmhuaidh was born in the Diocese of Meath, most probably in the district of Fercall, lordship of The Ó Maolmhuaidh, in what was then called King's County. While his exact place within the Ó Maolmhuaidh family is unknown, he recorded stories heard in his youth "of a great Christmas banquet for 960 people, lasting twelve days, held by Calvagh O'Molloy, chief of his name, at the end of the sixteenth century."

He appears to have been an uncle to Reverend Seán Ó Dálaigh, a student at Saint Isidore's College, Rome, who seemed to have been the man who acted as censor librorum for Ó Maolmhuaidh's Grammatica.

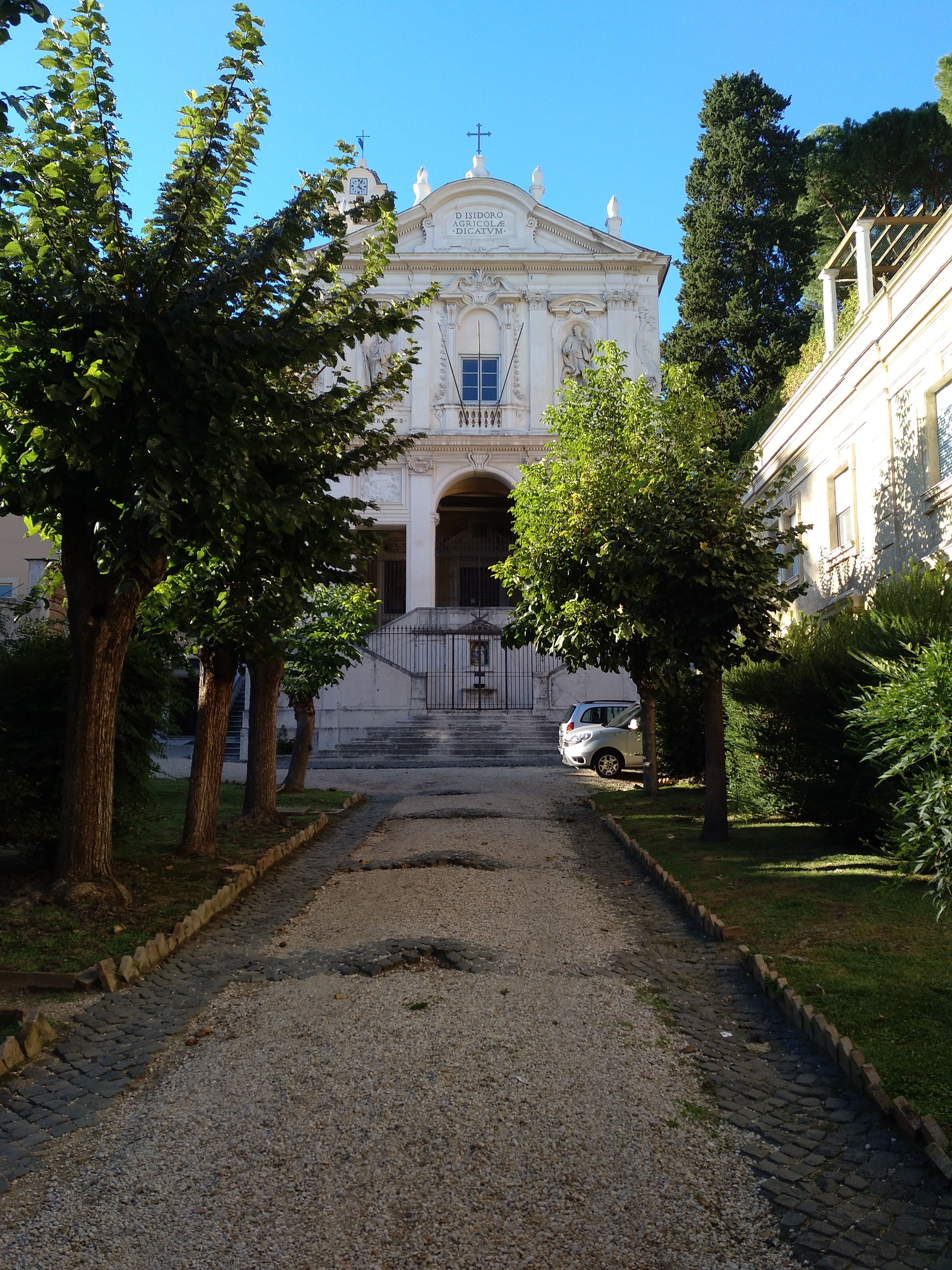
St. Isidore's church of the Irish Franciscans, Rome.

=== From Rome to Vienna and back again ===
Ó Maolmhuaidh became a member of the Friars Minor of Strict Observance at the Irish College at Rome on 2 August 1632. In 1642 he was appointed lecturer in philosophy at Klosterneuberg, Vienna, when aged about thirty-six. It was then that his solely theological work, Disputatio theologica de incarnatione verbi ad mentem Joannis Duns Scoti was written, probably as a thesis. It was published in 1645. He received instructions while in Mantua, on 4 May 1647, to proceed to the Irish Franciscan College of St. Isidore, at Rome, to teach philosophy; he was teaching theology there in 1652, and was doing so as late as 1677. While he never seems to have become guardian of the college on the death of Luke Wadding in 1657, he was president for a time in 1671.

=== Publications ===
Ó Maolmhuaidh was still in Rome when his Iubilatio genethliaca in honorem Prosperi Baltharasaris Philippi Hispaniarum principis was published there in 1658. "By 1663 he was preparing a course on philosophy for publication. The first part of his Philosophia ... tomus primus dialectiae breviarum complectens was published at Rome in 1666, but no further part was published."

His best-known work, Lucerna fidelium, seu, Fasciclus decerptus ab authoribus magis versatis qui tractarunt de doctrin a Christiana (Lochrann na gCreidmheach), was an Irish-language catechism of Catholic church doctrine. It was published in Rome in 1676. This project dated back to 1670, when it was instigated by the secretary of Congregatio de Propaganda Fide, Monsignor Baldeschi, who, along with Cardinal Altieri (later Pope Clement X), were among his most influential friends and contacts in the city.

His last printed work, Grammatica Latino-Hibernica nunc compendiata, was the first printed grammar of the Irish language, and was published in 1677. It is in Latin, and consists of twenty-five chapters: nine on the letters of the alphabet, three on etymology, one on contractions and cryptic writings, and twelve on prosody and versification. At the end is an Irish poem by Molloy on the neglect of the ancient language of Ireland and the prospects of its resuscitation.

=== As an Irish Franciscan ===
He attended a general chapter of the order at Rome in 1664 on behalf of the Irish provincial superior.

He had been working on behalf of his fellow Irish Franciscans for a number of years and was respected by them. In May 1670 he was appointed procurator of the Irish Franciscan province at the Roman curia. In 1671 he was recommended to the Congregatio de Propaganda Fide for appointment as bishop of Kildare, with Signora Maria Altieri, sister of Pope Clement X, among his supporters. The opposition of Oliver Plunkett, archbishop of Armagh, may have been enough to ensure he was not appointed, and he did not return to Ireland, though he had intended to do so toward the end of his life.

=== Final years ===
While a commemorative stone at St. Isidore's College erected early in the 1900s gave 1684 as the year of his death, Ó Maolmhuaidh's decease has since been narrowed to sometime in the last quarter of 1677. He died while travelling through France for Ireland, in the company of Seán Ó Dálaigh.

== See also ==
- Ó Maolmhuaidh
- Ailbe Ua Maíl Mhuaidh, bishop of Ferns, died 1223
- Mícheál Ó Cléirigh
- Séamus Ó Siaghail
- Luke Wadding
- Valentine Browne, OFM
