= Malloy =

Malloy is a surname of Irish origin, meaning "noble chief" (irish). (See also Molloy.) The name may refer to:

- Dannel Malloy (born 1955), American politician, 88th Governor of Connecticut
- Danny Malloy (footballer) (1930–2015), former Scottish footballer
- Dave Malloy (born 1976), American musical theater composer and playwright
- David Malloy, American country music songwriter and producer
- Doug Malloy, pseudonym of Richard Simonton, American business executive and body piercer
- Duncan Malloy
- Edward Malloy (born 1941), American priest, president of the University of Notre Dame 1987–2005
- Janine Malloy, character from the BBC soap opera EastEnders
- Jim Malloy (1935–1972), American Indy 500 racecar driver
- Jim Malloy (recording engineer) (1931–2018), American Grammy-winning recording engineer
- Judy Malloy, American poet
- Justyn-Henry Malloy (born 2000), American baseball player
- Kady Malloy, contestant on the seventh season of American Idol
- Larkin Malloy (1954–2016), American actor and model
- The Malloys, American music video and film directors Emmett Malloy and Brendan Malloy
- Michael Malloy (1873–1933), New York City vagrant; survived several attempts to murder him
- Mike Malloy (contemporary), American radio broadcaster in Atlanta, Georgia
- The Malloy Family, the sitcom Unhappily Ever After
- Matt Malloy Mr. Basketball (2007), South Dakota
- Ruth Lor Malloy (born 1932), Canadian activist and travel writer
- Ryan Malloy, character from the BBC soap opera EastEnders
- Terry Malloy, protagonist of On the Waterfront
- Trent Malloy, fictional character of Walker, Texas Ranger and the protagonist of its spinoff Sons of Thunder.
