= Francis Harold =

Irish Franciscan and historical writer

Francis Harold (died 18 March 1685), was an Irish Franciscan in the Order of Friars Minor and a historical writer.

== Life ==
He was for some time professor of theology in the Irish College in Prague; and afterwards went to Rome, where he spent the remaining years of his life in the Irish Franciscan College of St. Isidore, fulfilling the duties of librarian.

In 1662, while in Rome, Harold published an epitome of the "Annals" of his uncle, Friar Luke Wadding, in two folio volumes, extending from 1208 to 1540, to which he prefixed a life of Wadding, dedicating it to Cardinal Francesco Barberini. This life was again published in Rome in 1731. He also wrote Beati Thuribii Alphonsi Mogroveii archiepiscopi Limensis vita exemplaris, published in Rome in 1683. A copy of this work with the author's manuscript corrections is still preserved in the library of the Royal Irish Academy. His Lima Limata conciliis, constitutionibus synodalibus et aliis monumentis . . . notis et scholiis illustrata, published in Rome in 1673, contains a collection of documents connected with the synods and other affairs of importance to the Catholic Church in Peru.

Harold died in Rome on 18 March 1685.
