= James Louis Rice =

Irish Count of the Holy Roman Empire

Count James Louis Rice
- Born: James Louis Rice; 1730; Dingle, Kingdom of Ireland
- Died: 1793 (aged 63); Mount Trenchard House, County Kerry, Kingdom of Ireland
- Education: St Anthony's College, Leuven

James Louis Rice (1730–1793) was an Irish count of the Holy Roman Empire, duelist and a close friend of Emperor Joseph II. Rice was involved in a plot to save Marie Antoinette during her imprisonment in France and take her to his home in Dingle, Ireland.

== Biography ==
James Louis Rice was born in 1730 in Dingle, County Kerry to Thomas Rice and Alicia Meade. Many members of his family supported the Stuart and Catholic cause, leading to much of their property being confiscated and their emigration to mainland Europe, mainly France, in the seventeenth and eighteenth centuries.

Rice left Ireland in his youth and was educated at St Anthony's College, Leuven in what was then the French Empire. After his education, Rice joined the Imperial Austrian Army. Soon after, Rice became an intimate friend of Holy Roman Emperor Joseph II, whose sister was Queen Marie Antoinette of France. Rice was also a noted duelist of his day and while on holiday in Bath in 1778, he was said to have killed Viscount Adolphe du Barry, a relative of Madame du Barry. Rice was tried before a jury but was immediately acquitted. For his evidence at the trial, he stated that his contact with du Barry had begun in Paris in 1774 and that du Barry, knowing Rice's influence at the Austrian court, had attempted to solicit a favor at Vienna.

During the imprisonment of Marie Antoinette during the French Revolution, Rice formed a plan for her rescue—he arranged relays of post-horses all the way from Paris to the coast, where he had a boat waiting to take her to his house at Dingle, County Kerry. The plan failed because of her unwillingness to leave King Louis XVI and join the plan.

Rice was created a count Of the Holy Roman Empire by the Emperor Joseph II.

Rice later returned to Mount Trenchard House, County Kerry, where he died around 1793.
