= John Colgan =

Irish Franciscan friar (1592–1658)

John Colgan OFM
- Seán Mac Colgan
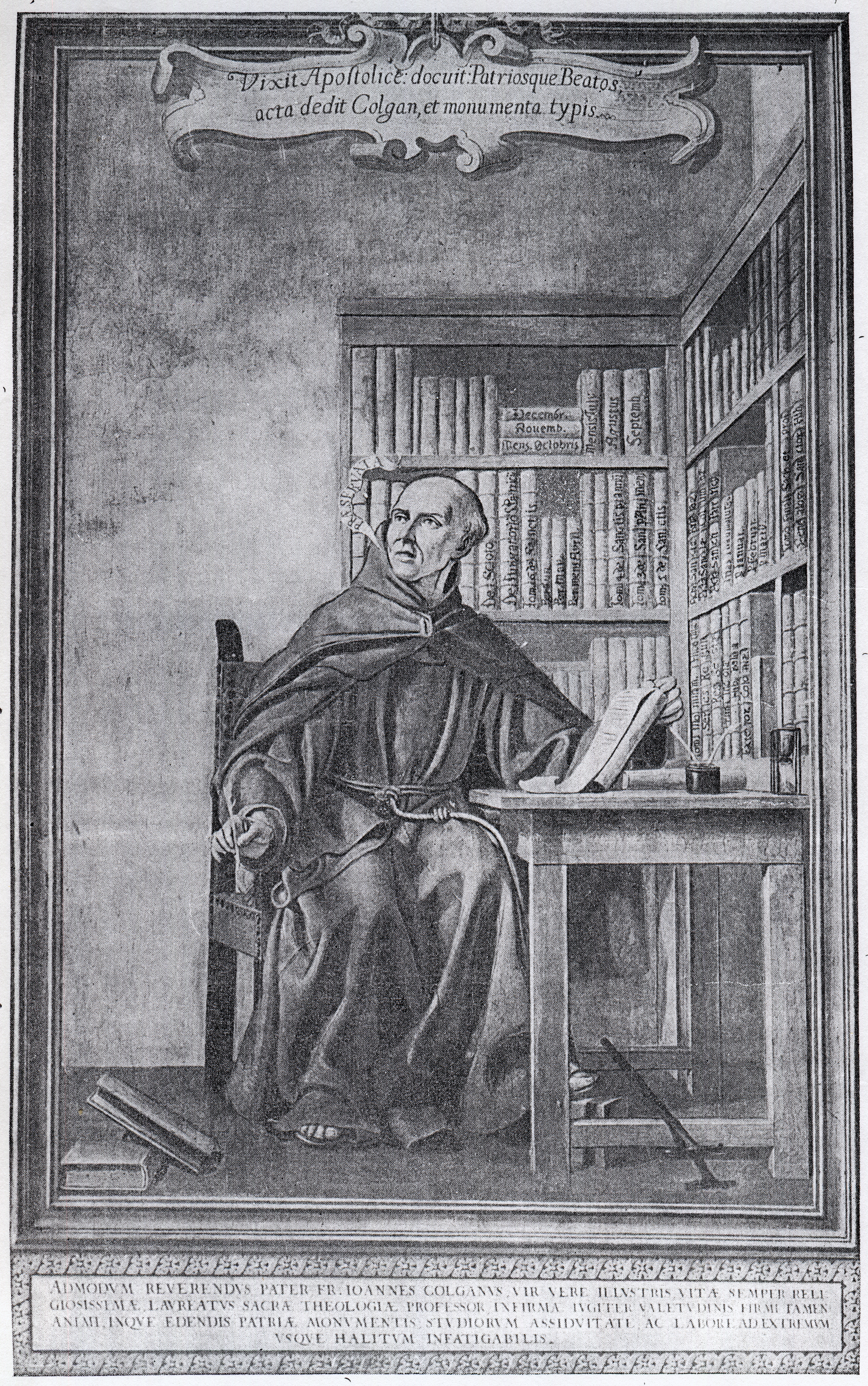
- John Colgan in a fresco created by Emmanuel di Como in St. Isidore's College, Rome, c. 1670

Personal life
- Born: 1592 Priestown, near Carndonagh, County Donegal, Ireland
- Died: 15 January 1658 (aged 65–66) St Anthony's, Leuven
- Notable work: Acta Sanctorum Hiberniae
- Education: Irish Franciscan College of St Anthony of Padua in Leuven

Religious life
- Religion: Christianity
- Order: Franciscan
- Profession: Hagiographer and historian
- Ordination: 1618

John Colgan, OFM (Irish Seán Mac Colgan; c. 1592 – 15 January 1658), was an Irish Franciscan friar noted as a hagiographer and historian.

== Life ==
Colgan was born c. 1592 at Priestown near Carndonagh, a member of the Mac Colgan sept of Inishowen. He left Ireland for the Continent around 1612 and was ordained a priest in 1618.

Colgan joined the Franciscan Order in 1620 and was sent to study in the Irish Franciscan College of St. Anthony of Padua in Leuven, where one of his teachers was Thomas Fleming. Colgan became a lecturer in philosophy at Aachen, then in 1628 he taught scholastic theology at Mainz, before returning to Leuven in 1634 as novice master.

St Anthony's trained friars for the Irish mission. Sometime previously, in consultation with Friar Luke Wadding of the College of St. Isidore in Rome, Friars Hugh Ward and Patrick Fleming (†1631) had set about preserving information regarding Irish history and culture. They planned a complete history of the Irish saints. Ward maintained close contacts with the Bollandists.

Ward sent a number of his colleagues, notably Michael O'Clery, to Ireland and elsewhere to collect or copy manuscripts, but died before much progress was made. While in Mainz, Colgan had offered to copy hagiographical material in various libraries. Upon Ward's death in 1635, Colgan became professor of theology and took over direction of the Irish history and letters project. A competent master of the Irish language, he had thus ready at hand an excellent collection of manuscripts of Irish hagiology.

He undertook a great work, to be published in six volumes, dealing with the whole range of Irish ecclesiastical history and antiquities. In 1645 he published at Louvain the Acta Sanctorum Hiberniae, containing the lives of the Irish saints whose feasts occur in the calendar for the months of January, February, and March. Hugh O'Reilly (Archbishop of Armagh) covered part of the cost.

The second volume of the series, entitled Acta Triadis Thaumaturgae (The Acts of a Wonder-Working Triad), appeared at Louvain in 1647. It deals with the three great national saints of Ireland, Patrick, Brigid, and Columbcille. For a long time the Trias Thaumaturga was nearly the only source of information on St. Patrick. Colgan's former teacher, Thomas Fleming, now Archbishop of Dublin defrayed most of the expense. Colgan's manuscript seems to have entirely disappeared.

Besides the "Lives" in the Trias Thaumaturga, there are also contained in this volume many valuable "Appendices", dealing with the ecclesiastical antiquities of Ireland, and critical and topographical notes, which, though not always correct, are of assistance to the student. In 1655 he published at Antwerp a life of Duns Scotus, in which he undertook to prove that this great Franciscan doctor was born in Ireland, and not in England, as was then asserted.

In 1652 Colgan resigned as a professor, dying at St. Anthony's, Leuven, on 15 January 1658 aged 66.

== Works ==
Colgan wrote a substantial body of work on Irish hagiology, drawing on both Ward's collection of manuscripts and his own familiarity with Irish tradition. Many of the manuscripts in question were lost around the time of the French Revolution, and in some cases Colgan's work provides the only surviving copy. The 1913 Catholic Encyclopedia praises Colgan's ability, industry, and critical sense; Seamus Deane calls him one of the more "scientific" historians of his time.

His principal works are:

- Acta Sanctorum Hiberniae (Louvain, 1645). Long title: Acta Sanctorum veteris et majoris Scotiae seu Hibernix, Sanctorum Insulae, partim ex variis per Europam MS. Codicibus exscripta, partim ex antiquis monumentis et probatis Auctoribus eruta et congesta; omnia Notis et Appendicibus illustrata. Tomus primus qui de Sacris Hiberniae Antiquitatibus est tertius, Januarium, Februarium et Martium complectens.
- Acta Triadis Thaumaturgae (Louvain, 1647). Long title: Triadis Thaumaturgae, seu Divorum Patricci Columbae et Brigidae, trium Veteris et Majoris Scotiae, seu Hiberniae, Sanctorum Insulae, communium Patronorum Acta, Tomus Secundus Sacrarum ejusdem Insulae Antiquitatum.
- Tractatus de Vita, Patria, Scriptis Johannis Scoti, Doctoris Subtilis (Antwerp, 1655).

Besides these he left in manuscript:

- De Apostolatu Hibernorum inter exteras Gentes cum Dice Alphabetico de exteris santis (852 pages);
- De Sanctis in Anglia, Britannia, Aremorica, in reliqua Gallia, in Belgio (1068 pages);
- De Sanctis in Lotharingia et Burgundia, in Germania ad senestram et dexteram Rheni, in Italia (920 pages).

Some of these manuscripts are now in University College Dublin.

== Sources ==
- Wadding-Sbaralea, Scriptores Ordinis Minorum (ed. Rome, 1806; Quaracchi, 1908 sqq.)
- Bibliotheca Universa Franciscana (Madrid, 1732)
- Ware-Harris, Writers of Ireland (Dublin, 1746)
- Doherty, Inis-Owen and Tirconnell, being some account of Antiquities and Writers of the County of Donegal (Dublin, 1895), 49–52, 71–106
- Hyde, A Literary History of Ireland (New York, 1902)
