= Anthony MacGeoghegan =

Irish Roman Catholic Friar Minor and bishop

Anthony MacGeoghegan, OFM (died 1664) was a 17th-century Irish Roman Catholic Friar Minor and bishop.

After he entered the Order, MacGeoghegan was educated at the College of the Immaculate Conception operated in Prague by the friars for their Irish members due to the restrictions on the Catholic faith in their homeland during that period.

MacGeoghegan was appointed as Bishop of Clonmacnoise by Pope Innocent X in 1647, for which he was consecrated by Giovanni Battista Rinuccini, the Archbishop of Fermo and papal nuncio to Ireland, on 2 April 1648. He served in that office until 1657, when he was translated to the office of Bishop of Meath, where he remained until 1661.
