= Féth fíada =

Magical mist in Irish mythology

Féth fíada is a mist or veil in Irish mythology, which members of the Tuatha Dé Danann use to enshroud themselves, rendering their presence invisible to human eyesight. Féth denotes this mist in particular, and fíada originally meant "knower", then came to mean "lord, master, possessor".

An example of usage occurs in the Altram Tige Dá Medar ("Fosterage of the House of Two Milk-Vessels"), where Manannán mac Lir makes an assignment to each member as to which Sidhe (fairy mound) they should dwell in, raising the feth fiada to conceal themselves from mortal men.

In the Lebor Gabála Érenn, one passage declares that the Tuatha Dé Danann came "without ships or barks, in clouds of fog [over the air, by their might of druidry]",

The miraculous powers of the feth Fiada have come to be ascribed to Christian saints. An allusion to this is found in Saint Patrick's Breastplate – a hymn whose composition was attributed to St. Patrick. The hymn is accompanied by a prose explanation of how it came to be created.

The high king Lóegaire mac Néill, with the will to prevent the saint and his band from coming to Tara to spread the faith, sent out troops to find and intercept them. But then Patrick chanted this hymn, which caused his pursuers to mistake Patrick for deer and fawns.

The hymn was given the title Fáeth Fiada, said to mean "Deer's Cry", though the phrase manifestly derives from the magic mist féth fíada.

The magic mist is also called ceo druidechta (Modern Irish: ceo draíochta [coː ˈd̪ˠɾˠiːxt̪ˠə]) and an example of its usage can be found in the Ulster Cycle tale Fled Bricrenn ("The Feast of Bricriu").

== See also ==
- Cloak of invisibility
- Smoke screen
