= Acta Triadis Thaumaturgae =

Acta Triadis Thaumaturgae or The Acts of a Wonder-Working Triad is a hagiography of the Irish saints, Saint Patrick, Brigid of Kildare, and Columba.

It was published at Leuven in 1647 by John Colgan, mainly at the expense of Thomas Fleming, Archbishop of Dublin. Due to a lack of money not all Colgan's writings could be published, and a catalogue of manuscripts found in his cell after his death, included detailed lives of Irish missionaries in England, Scotland, Belgium, Alsace, Lorraine, Burgundy, Germany, and Italy. A small remnant of these unpublished volumes is now in the Franciscan Library, Dublin.
