= Anthony Molloy =

Anthony Molloy may refer to:

- Anthony Molloy (Gaelic footballer) (born 1962), former Donegal captain
- Tony Molloy (lawyer) (born 1944), New Zealand author and lawyer
- Anthony James Pye Molloy (c. 1754–1814), Royal Navy officer
