= Pacificus Baker =

English Franciscan friar and spiritual writer

Pacificus Baker, O.F.M. (1695–1774), was an English Minorite friar and noted Catholic spiritual writer of the 18th century.

== Life ==
Pacificus Baker served as the Procurator and Definitor of his Order, and was twice elected Minister Provincial of the English province of the Order of Friars Minor, first in 1761 and again in 1770. He appears to have been attached to the chapel of the Sardinian Embassy on Lincoln's Inn Fields in London. He certainly attended at the execution of the Scottish Catholic nobleman, Lord Lovat, on Tower Hill on 9 April 1747.

Baker's works were mostly guides for meditation for the proper reception of the Blessed Sacrament and on the liturgical seasons of the Church year. His reputation as a writer suffered in latter years. He was one of several religious authors who developed a series of books to allow Catholics who were isolated from the celebration of the Eucharist to meditate on its focus in keeping with the liturgical year of the Catholic Church.

Baker encouraged the reception of the Blessed Sacrament by the laity as often as possible but recognized that, due to the lack of Catholic clergy in Britain in that era, this could be sporadic at best. His works provided the faithful with models for worship on the various Sundays through which they could participate in the liturgical life of the universal Church. His writings also proved popular for isolated Catholics on the American frontier.

An evaluation of Baker's work in the 19th century described it as "remarkable for unction, solidity, and moderation".

Pacificus Baker died in London on 16 March 1774.

== Works ==
- The Devout Christian's Companion for Holy Days, London, 1757, 12mo.
- Holy Altar and Sacrifice explained in some familiar dialogues on the Mass, London, 1768, 12mo, being an abridgment of F. A. Mason's Liturgical Discourse on the Mass.
- A Lenten Monitor to Christians, in pious thoughts on the Gospels for every day in Lent, from Ash Wednesday to Easter Tuesday, inclusive, 3rd edition, London, 1769, 12mo; again London, 1827, 8 vols.
- The Christian Advent, 1782.
- Sundays kept holy; in moral reflections on the Gospels for the Sundays from Easter to Advent. Being a supplement to the Christian Advent and Lenten Monitor, 2nd edition, London, 1772, 12mo.
- The Devout Communicant, Or Spiritual Entertainments Before and After Communion, London, 1761, 12mo.
- Essay on the Cord of St. Francis
- Scripture Antiquity
- Meditations on the Lord's Prayer, translated from French.
