= Aodh Buidhe Mac an Bhaird =

Irish Franciscan poet, historian and hagiographer (d. 1635)

Aodh Buidhe Mac an Bhaird, O.F.M. (aka Aedh Buidh Mac an Bhaird or Hugh Ward; c.1593 – 8 November 1635), was an Irish Franciscan friar who was a noted poet, historian and hagiographer. He is considered the founder of Irish archaeology.

== Background and early life ==
Mac an Bhaird was born in Tirhugh, County Donegal. His father may have been Eoghan Ruadh Mac an Bhaird (Geoffrey), who accompanied the Earl of Tyrconnell into exile in 1607, and was erenagh of Lettermacaward, and head of the Tirconnell branch of the ancient family of Mac an Bhaird. The family cultivated literature and filled the office of ollamh or chief historian to the O'Donnells.

Mac an Bhaird studied for six years in Connacht under a number of masters. Among those he named were Oliver Hussy, Henry Hart, Tadhg O hUiginn and Aonghhus Mac Con Midhe. In 1607 he left Ireland for Spain, and in January 1612 he entered the Irish Franciscan college at Salamanca, followed by his younger brother, Fearghal, in 1615. Here he made the acquaintance of Luke Wadding, under whose guidance he joined the Franciscans in 1616. After taking his degrees and receiving ordination, he was sent by the general of the order to lecture on philosophy in Paris, and in 1622 he was appointed lecturer in philosophy at the Irish College of St. Anthony, Louvain. On 21 April 1626, he was elected rector of the college.

== Scholarship ==
Luke Wadding states that Mac an Bhaird possessed great intellectual powers and a profound knowledge of the Irish language and antiquities; and John Ponce praises highly his lectures on Scholastic philosophy and theology, affirming that in these sciences he was second to none of the great writers of his time.

But Mac an Bhaird's chief interest was centred on the history and literature of Ireland. The plan of publishing the lives of the Irish saints and other ancient records of Ireland was his; he was a pioneer and founder of the school for Irish archaeology that arose in the seventeenth century, with its centre in the Irish College of St Anthony. At Salamanca, he discussed his project with Wadding, who promised him all help from the libraries of Spain, and in Paris, in 1623 he met Father Patrick Fleming, a distinguished Irish scholar, with whom he shared his idea of collecting material on the lives of the Irish saints. To this end, Mac an Bhaird travelled around northern France, investigating monastic libraries, while Fleming sent reports of his findings in French, German and Italian libraries. At the time Mac an Bhaird reached Louvain, St. Anthony's numbered among its inmates several accomplished Irish scholars: Aodh Mac Cathmhaoil, Antony Hickey, John Colgan, O'Docharty, and, shortly afterwards, Br. Mícheál Ó Cléirigh.

Mac an Bhaird laid before his associates his plan for a comprehensive history of Ireland—civil and ecclesiastical—a Thesaurus Antiquitatum Hibernicarum, and how the work was to be carried out. The first step was to procure original ancient Irish manuscripts or to have copies made of them. Father Fleming had already begun work in the libraries on the Continent, and, most significantly, it was decided to send Br. Ó Cléirigh (who belonged to a family of hereditary scholars) to Ireland in 1626 to collect Irish manuscripts. In the meantime Mac an Bhaird was employed in arranging and examining the documents which had been transmitted to St. Anthony's. He investigated the sources of the ancient martyrologies and chronicles. He was in constant correspondence with the early Bollandists – Henschenius, Rosweydus, Papebroch, etc. – on matters regarding the history and the saints of Ireland.

John Bap. Sollerius styles him "Vir doctissimus ac hagiographus eximius", and says that Mac an Bhaird's arguments in proof of the Irish birthplace of St. Rumold are unanswerable.

== Later life and death ==
At the time of his death, Mac an Bhaird had ready for publication several treatises which he intended as Prolegomena to his great work. The Bishop of Down, Connor and Dromore, William Reeves, writing on Mac an Bhaird and his fellow labourers, paid tribute to the Irish Franciscans for their services to Irish archaeology. Mac an Bhaird was buried in the college church. The following are the works he left ready for publication:

- De nomenclatura hiberniae;
- De statu et processu veteris in Hibernia reipublicae;
- Martyrologium ex multis vetustis Latino-Hibernicum;
- Anagraphen magnalium S. Patricii;
- Investigatio Ursulanae expeditionis;
- Acta S. Rumoldi.

These works were accompanied by critical dissertations and notes on historical and topographical questions. The Acta S. Rumoldi was published at Louvain in 1662, by one of Mac an Bhaird's disciples, Thomas O'Sheerin. Mac an Bhaird wrote Latin hymns and epigrams with elegance; also many poems in Irish of great beauty and feeling. Some of the former were printed in the Acta S. Rumoldi.

== Sources ==
- "Beathaionn na Braithre na Briathra":The Louvain Achievement, Micheal Mac Craith, Seanchas Ard Macha, vol.21–22, 2007–08
