= William Molloy =

William Molloy may refer to:

- William Molloy, Baron Molloy (1918–2001), British Labour Party politician
- William Molloy (Manitoba politician) (1877–1917), Canadian Liberal Party politician
- William Molloy (Irish politician), member of the Irish Senate
- William Molloy (footballer) (1904–?), English footballer
- W. Thomas Molloy (1940-2019), Lieutenant Governor of Saskatchewan
