= Valentine Browne, OFM =

Irish teacher, theologian and Franciscan guardian

Valentine Browne, OFM (c.1594–1672) was an Irish teacher, theologian and Franciscan guardian.

== Biography ==
A member of one of the Tribes of Galway, Browne was a son or brother of Sir Dominick Browne (c. 1585 – c. 1656), whose first cousin, Andrew Browne fitz Oliver, was the father of Mary Bonaventure Browne (before 1610 – after 1670). He appears to have been the nephew of Martin Browne, whose townhouse doorway, the Browne doorway, now stands in Eyre Square.

Browne was a graduate of the Franciscan house, St Anthony's College at Louvain, having studied at home in Galway and Ireland, and at the Irish College, Douai by 1617. In Louvain, he became a lecturer in theology and in this capacity returned to Galway to teach novices. He served as minister provincial for Ireland from 1629 to 1633. Afterwards, he was guardian of Galway till as late as 1639, and in 1642 welcomed the Poor Clares order of the Franciscans to the town.

In 1648 he was suspended from public ministry for opposing the papal nuncio, who had excommunicated supporters of the truce between the Irish Confederates and Lord Inchiquin. He died at Claregalway in 1672.

== Ó Cléirigh letter ==
Browne gave an important letter of support to Mícheál Ó Cléirigh, dated 15 May 1632, which acted as an assurance that Ó Cléirigh had his support, and that of the Franciscan order, in his antiquarian efforts, the result of which were the Annals of the Four Masters.

"Whereas ... you have purposed to compile from the ancient and almost obliterated Irish records whatever concerns the annals of our kings, and relates to the state, both ecclesiastical and civil, of this kingdom; lest we might not appear to second your work, which is so virtuous, and fills such a long-felt want, we command you by the merit of holy obedience to persevere until the end, if God shall give you life, in this laborious work of the Annals which you have already begun, and to submit all that you shall compile to the judgement of men skillfull in the Irish tongue, as you have done in the case of the smaller works."

== See also ==
- Antony Hickey
