= Sant'Isidoro a Capo le Case =

Roman Catholic church and monastery in Rome

Sant'Isidoro a Capo le Casé
- Chiesa di Sant'Isidoro a Capo le Case
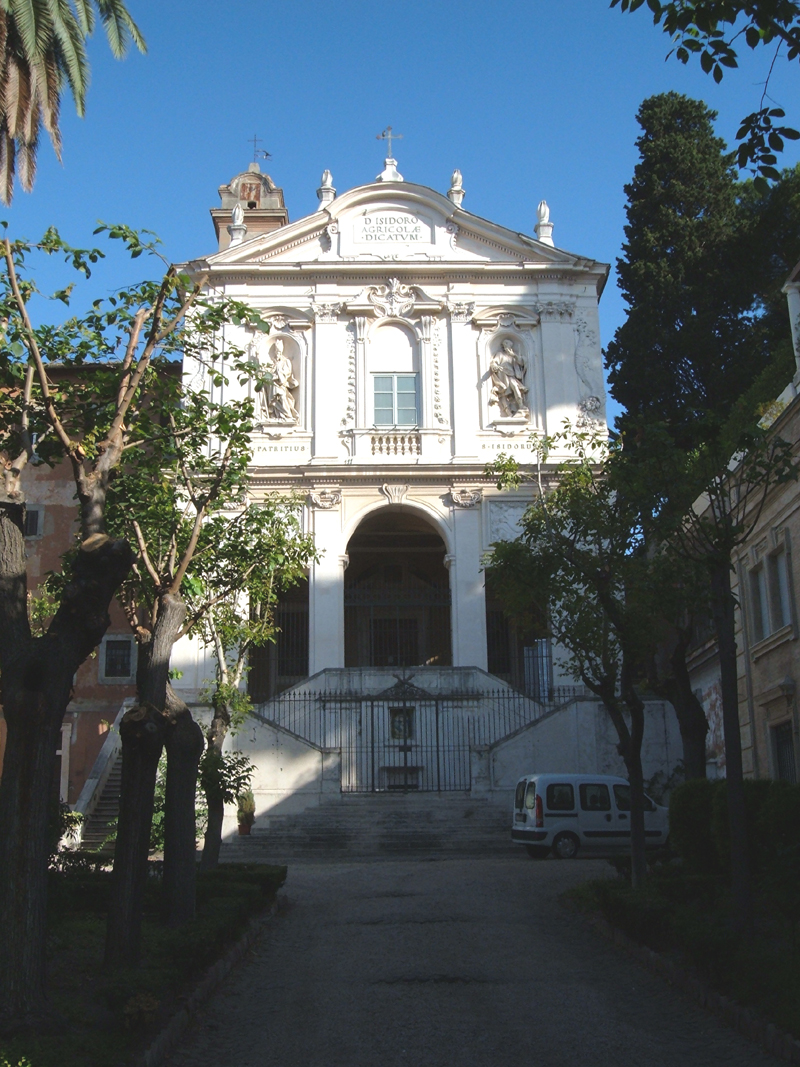
- The façade
- Click on the map for a fullscreen view
- 41°54′22″N 12°29′12″E
- Location: 41 Via degli Artisti, Ludovisi, Rome
- Country: Italy
- Language(s): English, Irish
- Denomination: Roman Catholic
- Tradition: Roman Rite
- Religious order: Franciscans
- Website: stisidoresrome.org

History
- Status: national church
- Founded: 1622
- Dedication: Saint Isidore

Architecture
- Architect: Gian Lorenzo Bernini
- Architectural type: Baroque
- Groundbreaking: 1622

Administration
- Diocese: Rome

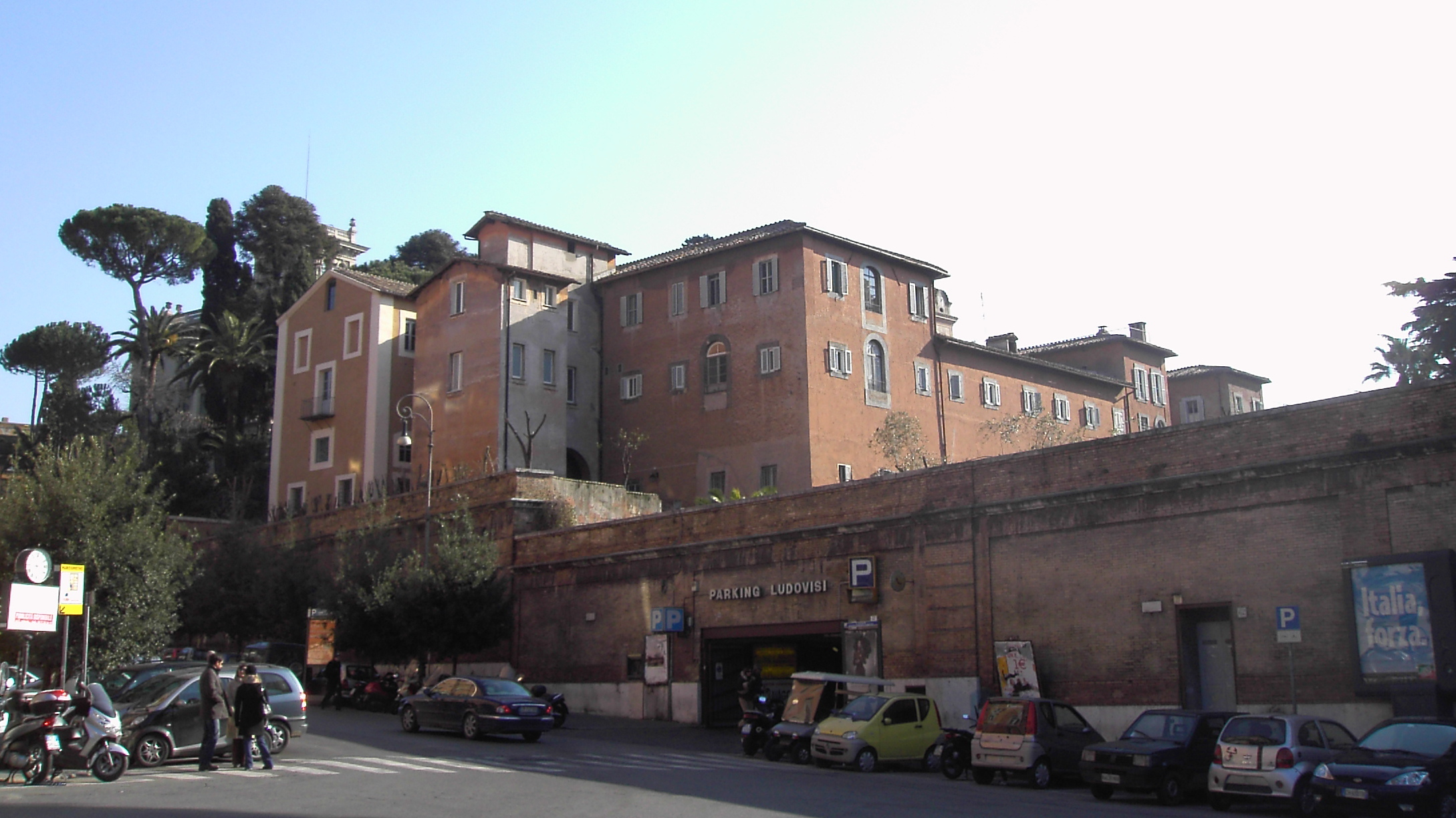
Monastic buildings of Sant’Isidoro

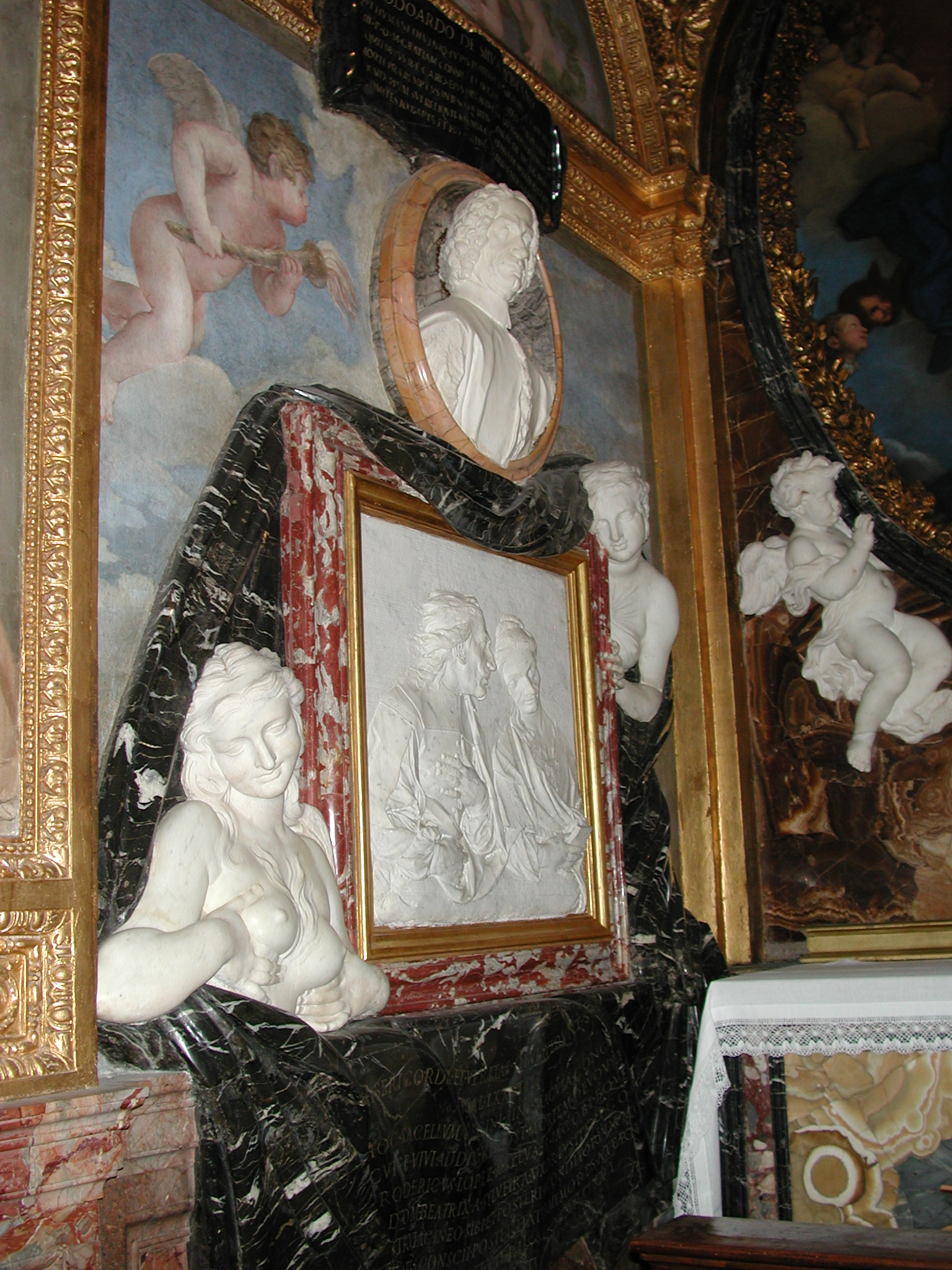
Cappella De Sylva

Sant'Isidoro a Capo le Case is a Catholic church, monastic complex and college run by the Franciscan Order in the Ludovisi district on the Pincian Hill in Rome. It contains the Cappella Da Sylva, designed by Gian Lorenzo Bernini, who also designed the funerary monument of his son Paolo Valentino Bernini in it. Since 2017 when San Patrizio a Villa Ludovisi became the national church of the United States, Sant'Isidoro has become the National Church of Ireland in Rome.

== Monastery ==
The monastery was founded by a gift from the nobleman Ottaviano Vestri di Barbiano, as shown in a bull of pope Urban VIII of 1625. Its construction was begun in response to pope Gregory XV's 1622 canonisation of Isidore of Madrid and four other saints – in that year, some Spanish Discalced Franciscans arrived in Rome wanting to found a convent for Spaniards and build a church dedicated to Isidore.

The convent building is built around two cloisters, the small cloister (il piccolo chiostro), designed by Casoni in 1626, and the Wadding cloister, named after Luke Wadding, with 17th century murals.

== Saint Isidore's College, Rome ==
After two years, however, the church and monastery passed to Irish Franciscans, who had fled Ireland due to British persecution, and it became the Saint Isidore's College, Rome (Italian: Collegio S. Isidoro, Roma or Irish: Coláiste Naomh Iosadóir, An Róimh) They were led by Luke Wadding OFM, who also founded a school of studies which was recognised by Urban VIII's 1625 bull, becoming the Pontifical Irish College, Rome. Saint Patrick was also added to the monastery church's dedication.

Wadding was able to attract to the college as professors some of the ablest members of the order at the time, all of them his countrymen. These included such men as Hickey, Patrick Fleming, and Ponce, and some years later Bonaventure Baron. Francis O'Molloy succeeded Wadding at St. Isidore's.

A Franciscan novitiate was established in 1656 in Capranica near Sutri.

The monastery was dissolved for a time by Napoleon I and from 1810 to 1820 its monastic buildings housed the artistic colony known as the Nazarenes. It became a monastery again after his defeat and it remains so to this day. The name of the street Via degli Artisti, which runs along the convent, still commemorates its use by the artists' colony.

At one point virtually every member of the Irish Franciscans (and Australian Franciscans which were part of the Irish Province) would have studied at some point in St Isidore’s.

In 2008, the Master General of the Franciscan Order transferred the convent and activities of St. Bonaventure in Grottaferrata, with an important library, here. However, is to be maintained if possible. Today, while maintaining an Irish Franciscan presence, thirteen Franciscans from six countries reside at the monastery.

== Church ==
The monastery church was initially begun according to a design by Antonio Felice Casoni. The facade is by Carlo Francesco Bizzaccheri (1704-1705) using the double-ramped staircase and portico already completed by Domenico Castelli.

The interior has a single nave in the shape of a Latin cross and has a barrel vault. There are two side chapels in the nave and two in the choir. The ceiling paintings are by Carlo Maratta (story of Joseph, Immaculate Conception), the painting in the dome is by Domenico Bartolini. The high altar has a painting of St. Isidore and the Virgin Mary by Andrea Sacchi. The Cappella Da Sylva was rebuilt according to a design by Gian Lorenzo Bernini.

== People Associated with St. Isidore's ==
- Bonaventure Baron OFM, theologian, is buried in the College
- Hubert Quinn OFM
- James McCormack OFM, Guardian during the Napoleonic Invasion
- Mícheál MacCraith OFM Guardian (2011–2017)
- Hugh McKenna OFM, Guardian (2017–)
- John Punch philosopher and theologian, served as Superior of St Ididore's, also of the Irish College in Rome

== See also ==
Irish Franciscan Colleges

- St Anthony's College, Leuven
- College of the Immaculate Conception, Prague (Franciscan College founded by priests from Leuven in Prague then Bohemia)

Other Irish Colleges in Rome

- Pontifical Irish College, Rome
- San Clemente al Laterano, Rome, Irish Dominican College.

== Sources ==
- Armellini, M., Le chiese di Roma dal secolo IV al XIX. Roma 1891
