= Albin O'Molloy =

Irish bishop of Ferns

Albin O'Molloy (Irish: Ailbe Ua Maíl Mhuaidh) (died 1223) was the Irish bishop of Ferns.

== Background ==
O'Molloy was native of what is now north County Tipperary. He became a Cistercian monk at Baltinglass, and eventually rose to be abbot of that house. His family, the O'Molloy, claimed descent from the branch of the Connachta later to be known as the southern Uí Néill.

Albin's ancestor, Fiachu mac Néill (flourished 507–514), was one of the Kings of Uisnech; his descendants, the Cenél Fiachach, held lands from Birr to Uisnech in southern Westmeath and part of Offaly.

Their southern territory became known as Fir Cell (land of the churches) covering a large part of what is now County Offaly, where the surname O'Molloy is still very common.

== Sermon in Dublin ==
In Lent 1186, when John Comyn, archbishop of Dublin, held a synod at Holy Trinity Church, O'Molloy preached a long sermon on clerical continency, in which he laid all the blame for existing evils on the Welsh and English clergy who had come over to Ireland.

== Bishop of Ferns ==
O'Molloy was shortly afterwards made bishop of Ferns, the see having been previously declined by Gerald of Wales. He was present at the coronation of Richard I on 3 September 1189. On 5 November, he was appointed by Pope Innocent III, with the Archbishop of Tuam and Bishop of Kilmacduagh, to excommunicate the Bishop of Waterford, who had robbed the Bishop of Lismore. In 1205, O'Molloy received 10 shillings from the royal gift, and on 3 April 1206 was recommended by the king to the chapter of Cashel for archbishop.

In November 1207, Innocent addressed a letter to O'Molloy with reference to persons who had been improperly ordained. On 17 June 1208, O'Molloy was sent by the king on a mission to the King of Connaught. On 15 September 1215, he had protection while attending the council at Rome; and on 5 September 1216 received custody of the bishopric of Killaloe.

== Excommunication of Earl of Pembroke ==
William Marshal, 1st Earl of Pembroke, while in Ireland between 1207 and 1213, seized two manors belonging to the Bishop of Ferns. For this O'Molloy excommunicated him; but the earl pleaded that it was done in time of war, and retained the manors all his life.

After Marshal's death, O'Molloy came to the king at London and petitioned for the restoration of his lands. King Henry III begged the bishop to absolve the dead, but O'Molloy refused to do so unless restoration were made. To this the younger William Marshal and his brothers refused their consent, and O'Molloy then cursed them, and foretold the end of their race.

The quarrel appears to have been at a crisis in 1218. On 18 April of that year, O'Molloy was prohibited from prosecuting his plea against William, earl Marshal, and on 25 June Pope Honorius III directed the Archbishop of Dublin and the legate to effect a reconciliation between the bishop and the earl. Nevertheless, the male line of the Marshall family ended with the death of Anselm Marshal, 6th Earl of Pembroke (2nd Creation) in 1245. Like all his brothers, he had no children, and the estate was divided up among female heirs.

== Life of Abban ==
About 1218, O'Molloy wrote a life of Abbán of Mag Arnaide (Adamstown), who died about 520. His interest in the saint partly stemmed from the fact that Mag Arnaide lay within the diocese of Ferns, but also denoted his personal attachment to the saint's cult in an episode where Abbán converts a man of royal rank from the area and baptises his son: "I who gathered together and wrote the Life am a descendant [nepos] of that son". However, the immediate circumstances which prompted the composition of the Life are likely to have been political, a direct consequence of his quarrel with the Marshall family.

== Death ==
O'Molloy died on 1 January 1223. Matthew Paris speaks of him as conspicuous for his sanctity. O'Molloy consecrated the infirmary chapel at the Cistercian abbey of Waverley on 6 November 1201, and dedicated five altars there on 10 July 1214. The monks of St. Swithin's, Winchester, made him a member of their fraternity. He appears as a witness to several charters in the Chartulary of St. Mary's Abbey, Dublin.

== See also ==
- Ó Maolmhuaidh
- Froinsias Ó Maolmhuaidh
