= Patrick Fleming (Franciscan) =

Irish Franciscan scholar (1599–1631)

Patrick Fleming O.F.M. (Lagan, County Louth, 17 April 1599 – Bohemia, 7 November 1631) was an Irish Franciscan scholar, who was murdered near Prague in the course of the Thirty Years' War.

== Life ==
Born Christopher Fleming, his father Gerald Fleming was the great-grandson of Christopher Fleming, 8th Baron Slane; his mother Elizabeth Cusack was a daughter of Robert Cusack, a Baron of the Exchequer and a close relative of Christopher Nugent, Lord Delvin. One of his uncles was Christopher Cusack who founded Irish Colleges in Douai, Antwerp and Lille. In 1612 Fleming went to Flanders, and became a student, first at St Patricks College of Douai, and then at the College of St. Anthony of Padua at Leuven.

In 1617 Fleming entered the Order of Friars Minor, and assumed the religious name of "Patrick". A year later he made his solemn profession of religious vows. Five years after this, he went to Rome with Hugh MacCaghwell, the Definitor General of the Order, and when he had completed his studies at the College of St. Isidore, was ordained a priest.

From Rome, Fleming was sent by his superiors to Leuven and for some years lectured there on philosophy. During that time he established a reputation for scholarship and administrative capacity, and when the Franciscans of the Strict Observance, the branch to which he belonged, opened a college the College of the Immaculate Conception in Prague, Fleming was appointed its first Guardian. He was also named a lecturer in theology.

== Prague ==
Fleming and Gerald Geraldin arrived in Prague November 1630; they were soon joined by others. They stayed with their Capuchin confreres at the Friary of Our Lady of the Snows while attempting to rebuild the derelict Monastery of Saint Ambrose. Books were so hard to come by in Prague that Fleming had them sent from Frankfurt.

The Thirty Years' War was raging at this time, and in 1631 the Elector of Saxony invaded Bohemia and threatened Prague. Fleming, accompanied by a fellow countryman named Matthew Hoar, headed for Vienna to arrange accommodations for the friars who were vacating Prague. On 7 November they encountered a party of armed Calvinist peasants near Benešov, who attacked and murdered the friars. Fleming's body was carried to the Monastery of Saint Francis of Assisi in Votice, four miles away, and there buried.

== Works ==
Fleming was especially devoted to ecclesiastical history, his tastes in this direction being still further developed by his friendship with his countryman Hugh Ward. The latter, desirous of writing on early Christian Ireland, asked for his assistance. Even before Fleming left Leuven for Prague he had massed considerable materials and had written a Life of St. Columba. It was not, however, published in his lifetime. That and other manuscripts fell into the hands of Thomas O'Sheerin, a lecturer in theology at the College of St. Anthony of Padua who edited and published them at Louvain in 1667.

Fleming also wrote a life of Hugh MacCaghwell, Primate of Armagh, a chronicle of St. Peter's Monastery at Ratisbon (an ancient Irish foundation), and letters to Hugh Ratison on the lives and works of the Irish saints. The letters were published in The Irish Ecclesiastical Record.
