= Peter Valesius Walsh =

Irish theologian and controversialist (1618–1688)

Peter Walsh, O.F.M., (Latin: Petrus Valesius; c. 1618 – March 15, 1688) was an Irish theologian and controversialist.

== Biography ==
Peter Walsh was born near Mooretown, County Kildare. His father was a chandler in Naas, and his mother is said to have been an English Protestant. He studied at Franciscan College of St. Anthony in Leuven, where he joined the Friars Minor and acquired Jansenist sympathies.

In 1646 Walsh went to Kilkenny, then in the hands of the rebel "confederate Catholics," and, in opposition to the papal nuncio Rinuccini, urged, and in 1649 helped to secure, peace with the viceroy Ormonde on behalf of King Charles I. Walsh was arrested by the militant Irish Confederate Catholic faction in 1646, along with other "peace party" advocates like Richard Bellings after the Treaty they had negotiated with Ormonde and the English Royalists was rejected in the Confederate General Assembly. Those opposed to the Treaty included militant Catholic clergy led by the Papal Nuncio Rinuccini) who wanted Roman Catholicism established as the state religion in Ireland and Irish lords, such as Owen Roe O'Neill, who wanted to recover the lands and power their families had lost after the Plantations of Ireland.

Walsh was guardian of the Franciscan friary at Kilkenny from 1648 to 1650. He served as chaplain to Castlehaven’s army in Munster from 1650 to 1651. All Catholic clergy captured by the Cromwellians were executed, and Walsh, in danger of death, fled Ireland, first to London, then Madrid, and Holland. He subsequently lived obscurely in London. In 1661 he was appointed accredited London agent by the few surviving Irish bishops.

=== The Irish Remonstrance ===
On the restoration of the monarchy in England Walsh urged his patron, Ormonde, to support the Irish Roman Catholics as the natural friends of royalty against the Protestant sects who had supported the Parliament during the Wars of the Three Kingdoms. Walsh sought to mitigate the restrictions they suffered and to efface the impression made by their successive rebellions by a loyal remonstrance to Charles II, boldly repudiating papal infallibility and religious interference in public affairs, and affirming undivided allegiance to the crown. For eight years he canvassed for signatures to this address, but in spite of considerable support, the strenuous opposition of the Jesuits and Dominicans deterred the clergy and nearly wrecked the scheme. (See the Act of Settlement 1662 for Irish politics at the time). A General Chapter of the Franciscans held in Antwerp in 1664 protested Walsh's publications as undermining the authority of the Minister General and of the Holy See.

=== Later life ===
From 1669 until his death, Walsh lived in London, much respected for his honesty, loyalty and learning. Through the influence of Ormonde, he secured the seneschalship of Winchester (worth about £100 a year) from the bishop of that see. He and his supporters were declared renegades to be spurned by other friars by the Order's General Chapter of 1670 for having published without the permission of the Minister General of the Order, but he remained a devout adherent of the Catholic Church, although he maintained friendly relations with the Anglicans, accepting their Holy orders and attending their churches. It is said that it was only a few days before his death, he was induced to make his peace with the Church, though that has been questioned. At his death, his books and papers were removed by the friars. He was buried in the churchyard of the Church of St Dunstan-in-the-West.

== Bibliography ==
Walsh wrote (1672–1684) a series of controversial letters against Pope Gregory VII's doctrine of papal supremacy over princes; a voluminous History of the Remonstrance (1674); Hibernica (1682), a history of Ireland; in 1686 a reply to the Popery of Thomas Barlow (1607–1691), Barlow being the Bishop of Lincoln; and other works. In these writings he consistently upheld the doctrine of civil liberty against the pretensions of the papacy.
