= Sheila Mulloy =

Irish writer and historian

Sheila Mulloy (née O'Malley; 1922 – 29 September 2013) was an Irish writer and historian.

Mulloy was born in Galway in 1922 and moved to Paris in 1945 to take up a scholarship to study at the Sorbonne. In 1949 she married John Mulloy, a businessman of Westport, with whom she had eight children.

Mulloy was editor of Cathair na Mart, the journal of the Westport Historical Society, founded by the late Jarlath Duffy and Peadar Ó Flanagáin in 1981. She was also elected Chief of the O'Malley clan.

Mulloy died on 29 September 2013, at the age of 91.

== Bibliography ==
- Franco-Irish Correspondence 1688–1692, editor, Irish Manuscripts Commission, 1984, ISBN 1-874280-32-0.
- O'Malley:People and Places, Ballinakella Press, 1986.
- Victory or Glorious Defeat:Biographies of participants in the Mayo Rebellion of 1798, editor, 2010, ISBN 978 1 907179 75 4.
