= Antony Hickey =

Irish Friar Minor and theologian

Antony Hickey (also known as Anthony Hickey and Antony Ó hÍceadha; 1586 – 26 June 1641) was an Irish Franciscan theologian.

== Life ==
Born at the Barony of Islands, County Clare, Ireland, Ó hÍceadha was a member of a bardic family. He was educated locally and later entered the College of St Antony at Louvain, which had just been founded for Irish Roman Catholic students, and received the Franciscan habit on 1 November 1607. Among his teachers there were Hugh Mac an Bhaird and Hugh Mac Caghwell (the latter was later named Archbishop of Armagh).

After his ordination to the priesthood, Hickey was appointed lecturer in theology at Leuven, and subsequently professor in the college of St Francis at Cologne. In 1619 he was summoned to Rome to collaborate with Father Luke Wadding in preparing the Annals of the Franciscan Order for publication, and the works of Duns Scotus. He took an active part in the labours of the commissions appointed by Pope Urban VIII to revise the Roman Breviary, and to examine into the affairs of the Eastern Church. At the general chapter of the order held in Rome in 1639, he was elected definitor general. He lived for some time at San Pietro in Montorio on the Janiculum. From 1624 until his death, he resided in Rome at the College of Saint Isidore.

== Works ==
During the discussions which were held in Rome concerning the doctrine of the Immaculate Conception, Hickey won distinction by his learning and acuteness. His treatise on this subject is called by Marracius (Bibliotheca Mariana) "opus insigne et absolutum". In his work on the Fourth Book of Sentences, he shows great breadth of view and critical perception; in addition to the scholastic method, he makes use of the historical method and fully recognizes the development of sacramental theology.

Hickey wrote:

- "Commentarii in Lib. IV Sententiarum" (Lyons, 1639);
- "Nitela Franciscanæ Religionis" (Lyons, 1627); in this book he refutes defends the early history of the Franciscan Order against Abraham Bzovius;
- "De Conceptione Immaculata B. Mariæ Virginis";
- "De Stigmatibus S. Catharinæ Senensis", written by order of the Sacred Congregation of Rites;
- "Ad pleraque dubia moralia, et ascetica, gravissimæ responsiones". This work, which Wadding calls "opus doctissimum", is still in manuscript.

== See also ==
- Francis Porter
- Aodh Buidhe Mac an Bhaird
