= Luke Wadding =

Irish Franciscan friar and historian (1588–1657)

Venerable Luke Wadding OFM
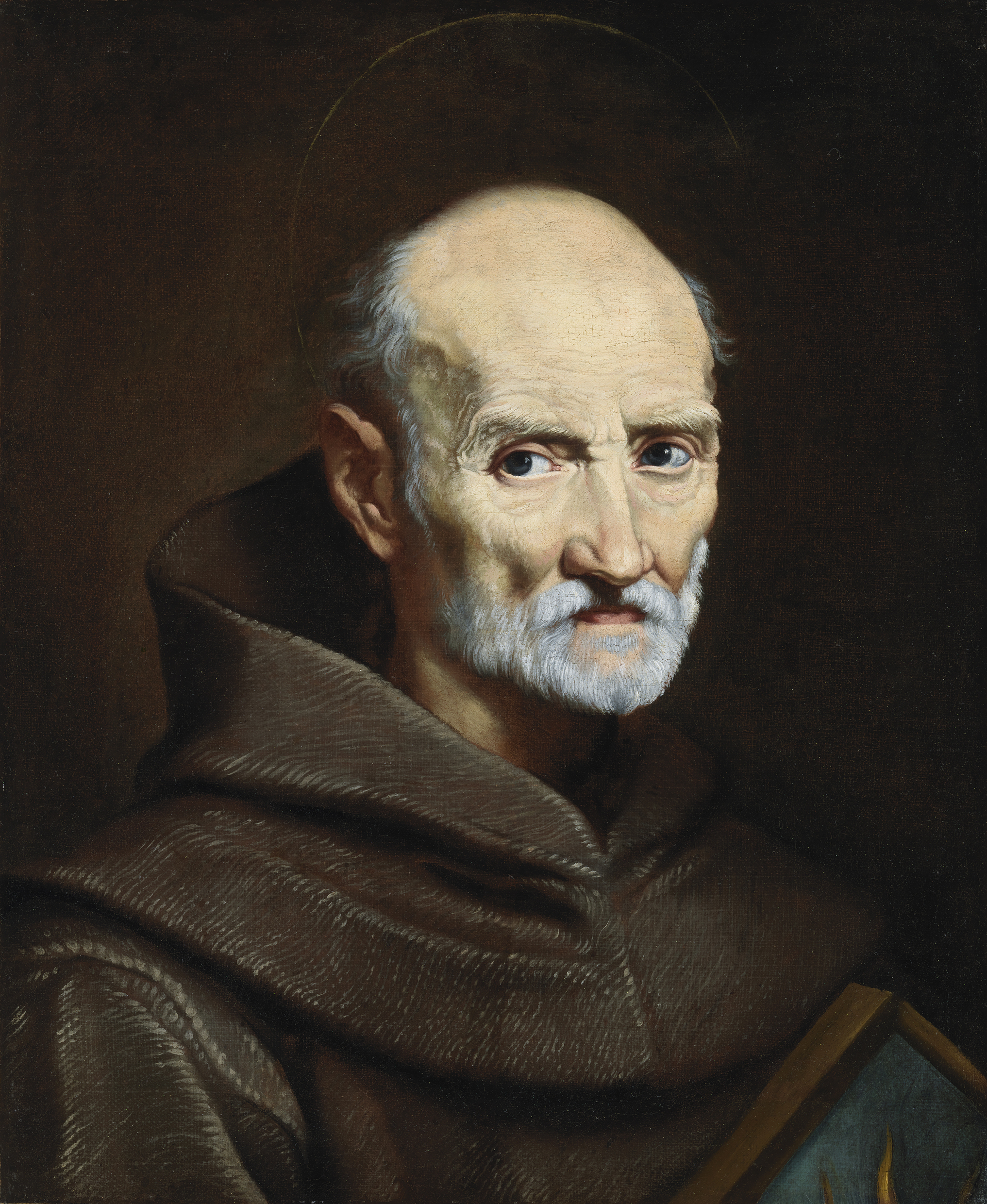
- Carlo Maratta, Luke Wadding (National Gallery of Ireland, Dublin)

Personal details
- Born: 16 October 1588 Waterford, Kingdom of Ireland
- Died: 18 November 1657 (aged 69) Rome, Papal States
- Buried: Sant'Isidoro a Capo le Case
- Denomination: Roman Catholicism
- Parents: Walter Wadding and Anastasia Wadding (née Lombard)
- Occupation: friar, historian and theologian

Sainthood
- Venerated in: Roman Catholic Church

Luke Wadding O.F.M. (16 October 1588 – 18 November 1657), was an Irish Franciscan friar, theologian, and historian.

== Life ==
=== Early life ===
Wadding was born on 16 October 1588 in Waterford to Walter Wadding of Waterford, a wealthy merchant, and his wife, Anastasia Lombard (a blood relation of Peter Lombard, Archbishop of Armagh and Primate of Ireland). Educated at the school of John Flahy in Waterford, he departed from Ireland in 1604 and entered the Irish College in Lisbon, which was supervised by the Jesuit Irish mission. Later that year, Wadding joined the Franciscan friars at Matosinhos, near Porto, before studies in philosophy and theology at Porto, Leiria, and Lisbon. From 1609 until 1613, Wadding completed his studies at the University of Coimbra.

=== Franciscan friar ===
In 1613, Wadding was ordained to the priesthood by João Manuel de Ataíde, Bishop of Viseu. The ordination took place at Viseu Cathedral, north of Coimbra. Thereafter, Wadding returned to Leiria, before he arrived at the University of Salamanca, where he became professor of theology. In 1618, Philip III of Spain sent Wadding to Rome with a theological legation in defence of the doctrine of the Immaculate Conception. This mission was led by Wadding's friend, Antonio de Trejo, Franciscan bishop of Cartagena. Wadding participated in proceedings between the Spanish legation and the Roman Curia in 1618 and 1619. He also conducted research at the libraries and archives of Rome and, from 1619 until 1624, he lived at the Roman friary of San Pietro in Montorio. During this time, Wadding began to publish his extensive studies.

In the spring of 1625, Benignus de Genoa, the Franciscan minister general, offered Wadding a new unfinished church and small friary on the Pincian hill in the city. Wadding accepted and the college opened for the education of Franciscans for the mission to Ireland on 13 June, the feast of St Anthony of Padua. The first professors were Friar Antaine Ó hÍceadha of a renowned learned family of hereditary physicians from Thomond, Friar Patrick Fleming from County Louth, Friar John Punch from Cork, Friar Gaspar de la Fuente from Toledo, and Friar Martin Walsh from Waterford. Wadding gave the college a library of 5,000 printed books and 800 manuscripts. The library holdings at St. Isidore's were predominantly historical, which reflected almost forty years of preparation for Wadding's Annales Minorum. The original collections also consisted of theology and philosophy, patristics, sacred writing, canon law and art. The books were carefully organised and classified with catalogues of the names of authors and works.

Wadding served as the Irish bishops' agent in Rome and brought to print the first edition of Annales Minorum in eight volumes. This monumental work marked him out as the best of Franciscan chroniclers. It set the standard for the history of a religious order, accounting for the foundation and development of Franciscan friaries over four centuries; the contacts between friars and their benefactors; and the activities of religious superiors.

According to his nephew, Bonaventure Barron, Wadding received several votes from cardinals in a conclave for a papal election. In 1684, Barron explained: qui etiam in Conclavi, aliquot Cardinalium suffragio pro summon Pontificatu accepit; denique Authori nostro avunculus.

Wadding was an enthusiastic supporter of the Irish Catholics during the Irish Confederate Wars, and his college became the strongest advocate of the Irish cause in Rome. This spirit of patriotism originated by Wadding had a lasting impact. Wadding sent officers and arms to Ireland, and induced Pope Innocent X to send Giovanni Battista Rinuccini there. The Confederate Catholics petitioned Pope Urban VIII to make Wadding a cardinal, but he found ways to intercept the petition, and it remained in the archives of the college.

Luke Wadding was an important art patron. He commissioned artworks for St. Isidore's church in Rome. The painters Andrea Sacchi and Carlo Maratti were among the most famous artists commissioned by Wadding.

== Death ==
Wadding died on 18 November 1657 at the age of 69 and is buried in the church of the College of San Isidore, in Rome. His life was written by his nephew, Francis Harold, a Franciscan friar from Limerick. Bonaventure Barron of Clonmel, Co. Tipperary, was another nephew.

== Legacy ==
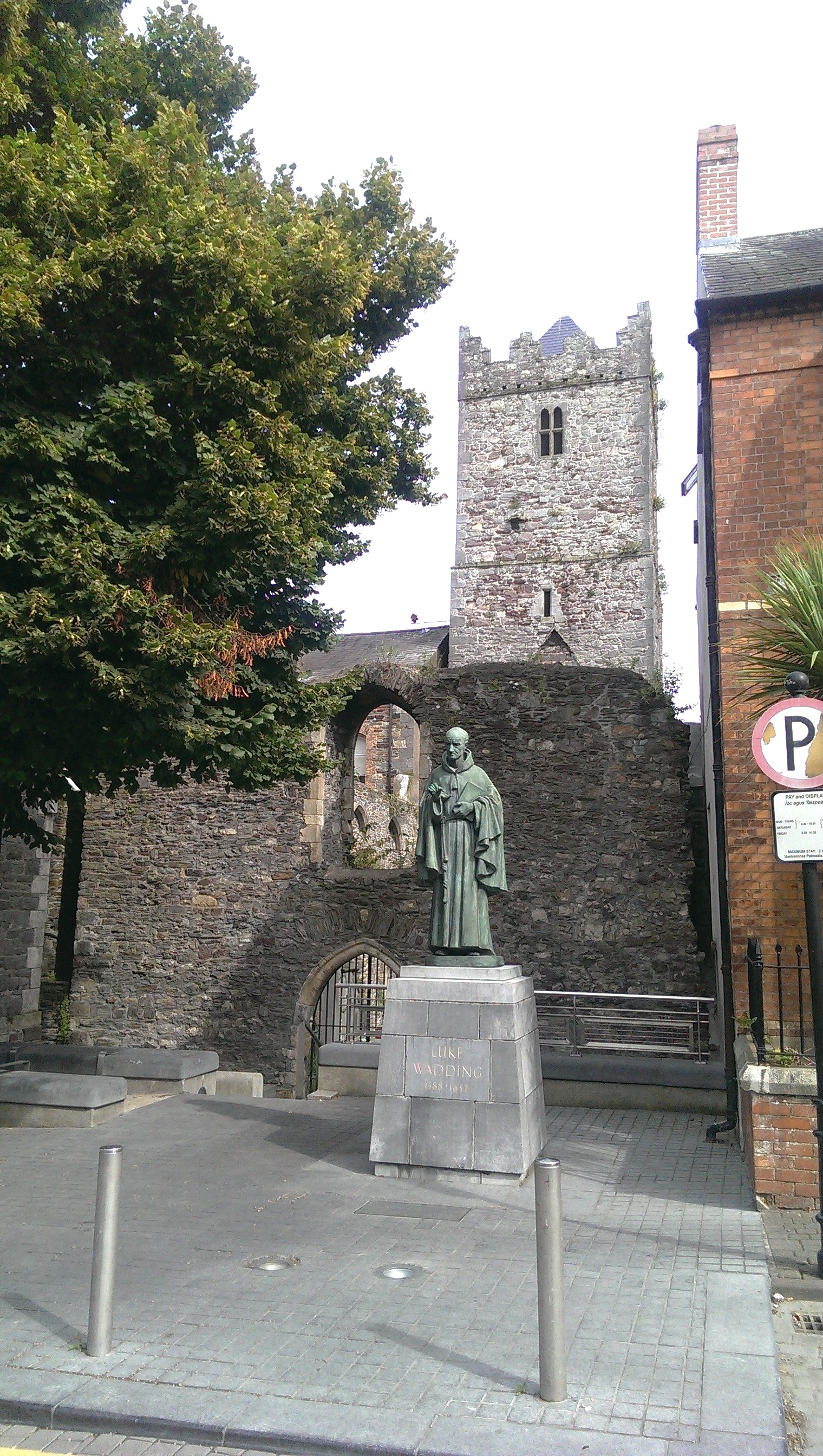
The entrance to the French Church, Waterford with the statue of Fr. Luke Wadding

Together with Cardinal Ludovico Ludovisi Wadding founded the Ludovisian College for Irish secular clergy, which later became the Pontifical Irish College. In the late nineteenth century, following the unrest of the Risorgimento, ongoing interest from scholars in Ireland led the friars at St Isidore's to obtain permission from the Franciscan minister general to assign Irish manuscripts to Dublin. In 1900, Wadding's portrait and part of his library were in the Franciscan friary on Merchant's Quay, Dublin. Through Wadding's efforts, St Patrick's Day became a feast day. It took years for it to develop and until the twentieth century for St. Patrick's Day parades to occur in his native Ireland, while the first organised celebration in America took place in the eighteenth century in cities like Boston and New York. Today, parades occur in faraway places like Russia and Japan. Amid all the celebrations, most Irish today do not know about the "Waterford man who created St. Patrick's Day."

Prior to the 1950s, when work began on a new critical edition, the Wadding edition of the works of Duns Scotus was the most complete version of the thought of the Subtle Doctor available to scholars. The work was compiled in 1639, when Wadding was in Rome, and updated in the 1890s. While containing a number of spurious works, as of 2021, with the new Vatican edition of Scotus yet to be completed, the Wadding edition remains a well-judged and influential collection.

In the 1950s, a statue of Wadding by Gabriel Hayes was erected on the Mall in Waterford, adjacent to Reginald's Tower and one of the city's most prominent locations. The Waterford-born Franciscan's literary, academic and theological attributes were denoted by a quill pen held poised in the statue's right hand. More recently this statue was replaced by one of Thomas Francis Meagher. The figure of Luke Wadding was moved to a position at the entrance to the French Church, Waterford on Greyfriars.

In 2000, the Waterford Institute of Technology dedicated a new library building to his name.

== Works ==
A voluminous writer, his chief work was the Annales Minorum in eight folio volumes (1625–1654). Re-edited in the eighteenth century, it is the classical work on Franciscan history. The third edition was published in thirty-two volumes from 1931 until 1964, bringing the historical record up to the year 1680. He published his Scriptores ordinis minorum, a bibliography, hagiography and martyrology of Franciscan writers, the Opera omnia of Duns Scotus, and the first collection of the writings of St Francis of Assisi.

In his lifetime, Wadding oversaw the publication of works at nine locations in France, the Habsburg Netherlands, Italy, Spain and Austria. In chronological order, these were Douai, Rome, Antwerp, Louvain, Vienna, Mons, Lyon, Madrid and Viterbo.

- Annales Minorum, in eight volumes (1625–54)
- Duns Scotus in twelve volumes (1639, fol.)
- πρεσβεία [Presbeia] published at Louvain (1624)

a treatise on the Spanish legation to Rome in defence of the doctrine of the Immaculate Conception. The doctrine of the Immaculate Conception of the Virgin, the works of Duns Scotus, and the history of the Franciscan order were Wadding's favourite subjects of study.

- De Hebraicæ linguæ origine, præstantia, et utilitate

Wadding's essay is prefixed to the concordance of the Hebrew scriptures of Mario di Calasio, which Wadding prepared for the press in 1621.

== See also ==
- Michael Wadding (priest)
- List of people on the postage stamps of Ireland

== Sources ==
- Gibson & Cumming (1849). A Preservative Against Popery, in Several Select Discourses Upon the Principal Heads of Controversy Between Protestants and Papists. p. 139.
- Hazard, Benjamin (2025). Luke Wadding. A Life: Religion, Politics and Culture, 1588-1657.

Attribution:

- This article incorporates text from a publication now in the public domain: Moore, Norman (1899). "Wadding, Luke". In Lee, Sidney (ed.). Dictionary of National Biography. Vol. 58. London: Smith, Elder & Co. pp. 408–409.
- Herbermann, Charles, ed. (1913). "Luke Wadding" . Catholic Encyclopedia. New York: Robert Appleton Company.
- Wadding, Luke. Historian and theologian, born at Waterford, Ireland, Oct. 16, 1585; died at St. Isidore's College, Rome, Nov. 18, 1657.

=== Referred works ===
- Harold, Francis, Vita Fratris Lucae Waddingi 3rd edn. (Quaracchi, 1931)
- Webb, Alfred, A Compendium of Irish Biography: Comprising Sketches of Distinguished Irishmen, 1878
- Anderson, Christopher (1830). Historical Sketches of the Ancient Native Irish and Their Descendants. Oliver & Boyd.
- Meehan, Charles Patrick, The rise and fall of the Irish Franciscan monasteries, and memoirs of the Irish hierarchy in the seventeenth century, 1877
- Cleary, Gregory, Father Luke Wadding and St Isidore’s College, Rome: Biographical and Historical Notes and Documents, Tipografia del senato del G. Bardi, Rome, 1925
- Franciscan Fathers (eds.), Father Luke Wadding Commemorative Volume, Clonmore & Reynolds, Dublin, 1957
- Fidanza, Giovan Battista, Luke Wadding's art: Irish Franciscan Patronage in Seventeenth Century Rome, Franciscan Institute Publications, St. Bonaventure, NY, 2016
- Binasco, Matteo (ed.), Luke Wadding, the Irish Franciscans and Global Catholicism, Routledge, Abingdon, 2020
- Hazard, Benjamin, Luke Wadding. A Life: Religion, Politics and Culture, 1588-1657, Peter Lang, Oxford, 2025
