= Definitor =

Roman Catholic title

In the Catholic Church, a definitor (Latin for 'one who defines') is a title with different specific uses. There are secular definitors, who have a limited amount of oversight over a part of a diocese, and also definitors in religious orders who generally provide counsel and assistance to the superiors general and provincial superiors of their order.

== Secular definitors ==
In a deanery or vicarate forane, which is a grouping of several neighboring parishes within a diocese, a definitor is either the second (and unique) highest office, immediately below the dean or vicar forane and his deputy, or is the priest in charge of any of a number of even smaller districts within the deanery, called definitio. They oversee the ecclesiastical property and generally assist the dean, under the ordinary authority of the bishop. Alternative titles for this position are chamberlain or treasurer. These diocesan offices are not prescribed by canon law, and can be omitted.

== Regular definitors ==
In the Cistercian Order, the Abbot General is assisted by a council of five definitors, traditionally two French-speaking, one German-speaking, one English-speaking and one Dutch-speaking. Among the Franciscan Observants, the Definitor is the third highest office of the Order, below the Minister General and Procurator General. In the Camaldolese Order, Definitor may be given as the personal title of a prior. In the Dominican Order a Provincial Definitor serves under the Prior Provincial.

The title Definitor General is used by the Discalced Carmelites, the Friars Minor and the Capuchins. These officers are generally elected by the General Chapter of their Orders for a specified period of time.
