= Flight of the Earls =

1607 Irish historical event

Coordinates: 55.0906°N 7.5548°W

- The Departure of O'Neill out of Ireland (1958) by Thomas Ryan
- Date: 14 September 1607
- Location: Rathmullan, Ireland
- Participants: Full list
- Outcome: Symbolises the end of Gaelic Ireland, Plantation of Ulster

The Flight of the Earls (Irish: Imeacht na nIarlaí) took place on 14 September [O.S. 4 September] 1607, (Note: Unless otherwise stated, all dates before 1752 are given in the Gregorian calendar, which was adopted by Catholic Europe in the 1580s.) when Irish earls Hugh O'Neill, Earl of Tyrone, and Rory O'Donnell, Earl of Tyrconnell, permanently departed Rathmullan in Ireland for Catholic Europe during a period of extreme political tension with the English Crown. The Flight's exact motivation is unclear and the subject of debate. (Note: "The causes which motivated or drove the earls to flee from Ulster have perplexed writers and historians from the time of the event to the present day." "One of the most argued over events in the career of Hugh O'Neill, second Earl of Tyrone, is his departure from Ireland..." "The factors which induced O Neill to leave Ireland in 1607 have always been a matter of controversy among historians." "O'Neill's decision to leave Ireland has puzzled contemporaries and successive generations of historians..." "There is no satisfactory explanation for the panicked flight of Hugh O'Neill...") They were accompanied by their extended families, retinue, followers and fellow nobility, numbering about 100 people. The earls were patriarchs of the two most powerful clans in Ulster—the O'Neill and O'Donnell clans— which claim descent of Niall of the Nine Hostages and their emigration is considered to symbolise the end of Gaelic Irish society. The earls' lands were later escheated and settled by Protestants from Great Britain as part of the Plantation of Ulster.

Both earls fought against the Crown in the Nine Years' War (1593–1603), which ended with their surrender. The newly crowned James I of England granted the earls generous peace terms which allowed them to retain most of their lands and titles. Many courtiers were unsatisfied with the king's leniency, and hostility towards the earls from officials gradually increased over time. The implementation of English law in Ireland led to financial difficulties for both earls as well as a major land rights dispute between Tyrone and his vassal Donnell Ballagh O'Cahan, which was weaponised by officials such as Arthur Chichester, John Davies, and George Montgomery.

The earls may have been conspiring against the government, (Note: "Historians have been unable to agree on whether or not there was [an Irish] plot in 1607..." "...they were certainly wrong in claiming that O'Neill was innocent of plotting himself..." "It may be that [Tyrone] was secretly involved in a catholic conspiracy and feared discovery.") and their flight could have been an attempt to evade arrest or execution. (Note: "On whether there was a government plot against O'Neill's life the historical jury is still out". "Their allegation that there was an official plot against O'Neill is still in question.") The earls were bound for A Coruña, as Spain had allied with the earls' confederacy during the war. They could not reach Spain due to storms and disembarked in Quillebeuf-sur-Seine, France. Spanish king Philip III forbade the earls from entering Spain for fear of violating the 1604 Anglo-Spanish peace treaty. The refugees spent time in Leuven in the Spanish Netherlands, where the earls left their young children to be educated at the Irish College of St Anthony. The earls sought support from Pope Paul V and arrived in Rome on 29 April 1608, where they were granted small pensions. Their accommodation in Rome was paltry compared to their estates in Ireland. Tyrconnell died of a fever three months later. Tyrone repeatedly demonstrated his intent to return to Ireland and retake his lands, but he became ill and died in 1616 before doing so.

Most of the passengers on the Flight never returned to Ireland. The Flight was declared as treasonous by King James, which led to the acquisition and plantation of the earls' lands. The Flight is considered a watershed moment in Irish history and has been depicted romantically by Irish nationalists.

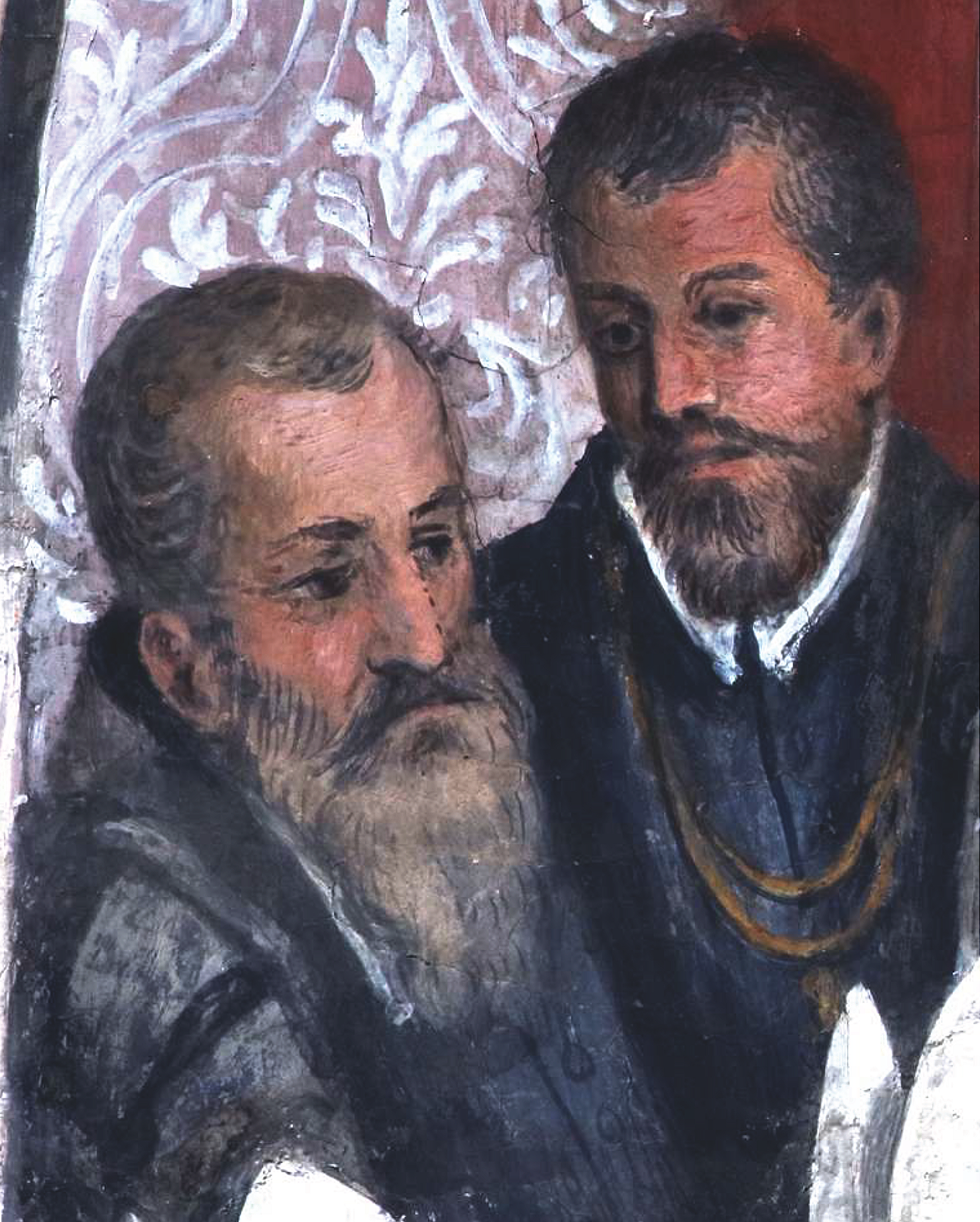
Hugh O'Neill, Earl of Tyrone (left) and Rory O'Donnell, 1st Earl of Tyrconnell, painted c. 1610 by Giovanni Battista Ricci

== Background ==
=== Nine Years' War ===
From 1593, Ulster lords Hugh O'Neill, Earl of Tyrone, and Hugh Roe O'Donnell led a confederacy of Irish lords in resistance to the Tudor conquest of Gaelic Ireland. The Nine Years' War was a major political threat to the Tudor government's control of Ireland, and cost Queen Elizabeth I £2,000,000 to suppress—as much as was spent on all continental wars waged during her reign. Despite the confederacy's military assistance from Spain (which was then engaged in the Anglo-Spanish War against England), confederate forces were decimated at the Siege of Kinsale. Hugh Roe traveled to Spain to seek further support from King Philip III, leaving his younger brother Rory in control of his forces.

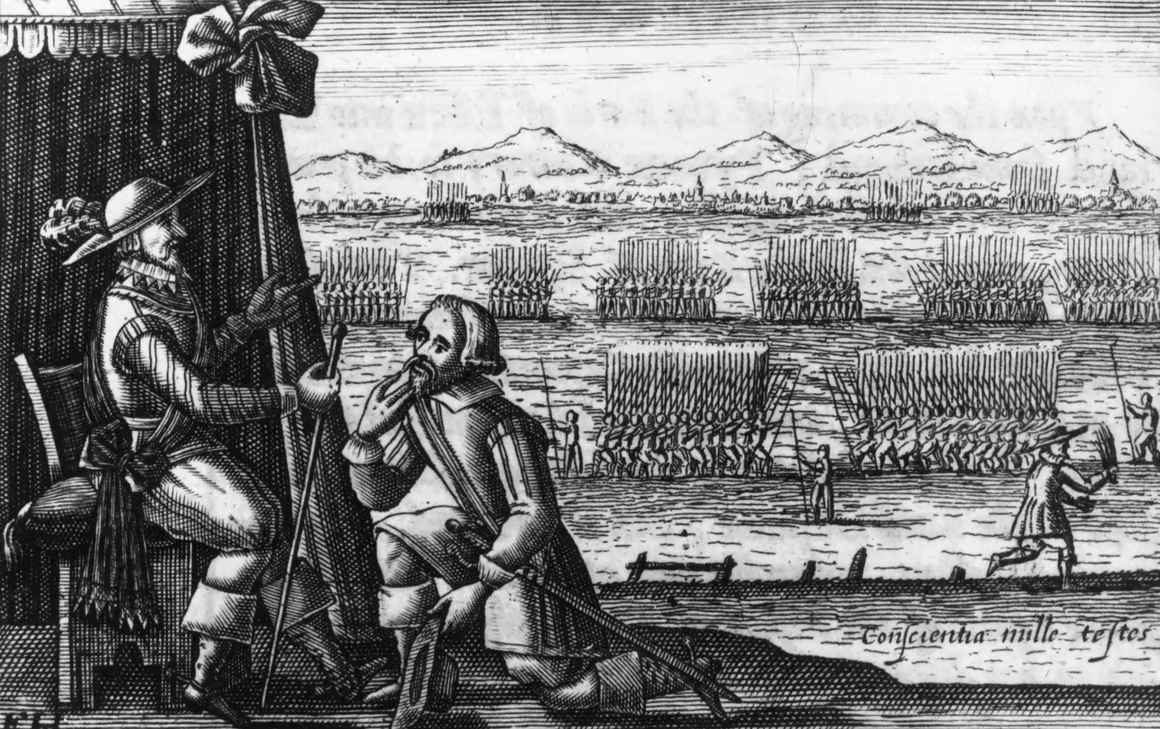
18th-century depiction of Tyrone's submission to Baron Mountjoy

The confederacy disintegrated as English forces travelled across Ulster destroying crops and livestock. The royal army's use of scorched earth tactics led to famine across 1602–1603, with conditions so extreme that the local population were reduced to cannibalism. The promised Spanish fleet was repeatedly delayed due to a lack of resources, despite Hugh Roe's petitioning. He died in Simancas of illness on 9 September 1602. Subsequently the Spanish government abandoned support for the confederacy and sought peace with England. Rory surrendered to Lord Deputy Charles Blount, 8th Baron Mountjoy at Athlone on 14 December [O.S. 4 December]. Tyrone went into hiding for several months, but eventually surrendered by signing the Treaty of Mellifont on 9 April [O.S. 30 March] 1603, which ended the Nine Years' War.

=== Implementation of English law in Ireland ===
In summer 1603, Tyrone and Rory travelled to London to submit to King James I, who had acceded to the English throne mere days before Tyrone's surrender. Despite years of bloodshed fighting the royal army, the confederates received remarkably generous terms. Tyrone even went hunting with the new king. James pardoned Tyrone and Rory and restored them to most of their lands. Rory was made 1st Earl of Tyrconnell. (Note: Wormald notes that "it is impossible to imagine Elizabeth, at the end of the Nine Years' War, treating Tyrone and Tyrconnell as James did." Already reigning as King of Scotland, James believed he had a better understanding of Gaelic Irish culture than the Tudors since he had experience working with chiefs in the Scottish Highlands; he took a similar approach to diplomacy with the Irish. In general he was less prejudiced against Irish people than Elizabeth I. James also believed that independently-powerful lords were crucial to successfully run a large kingdom, of which Ireland was his third (after England and Scotland). His lenient treatment of Tyrone was possibly influenced by the fact that he had diplomatic relations with Tyrone during the Nine Years' War.) Many English courtiers were upset and complained at the mild treatment of the earls, (Note: John Harington wrote: "I have lived to see that damnable rebel Tyrone brought to England, honoured, and well-liked. Oh! My lord, what is there which does not prove the inconstancy of worldly matters! How did I labour after that knave's destruction! I was called from my home by her majesty's command, adventured perils by sea and land, endured toil, was near starving, ate horse-flesh in Munster; and all to quell that man, who now smileth in peace at those who did hazard their lives to destroy him".) and became intent on dismantling the earls' remaining power.

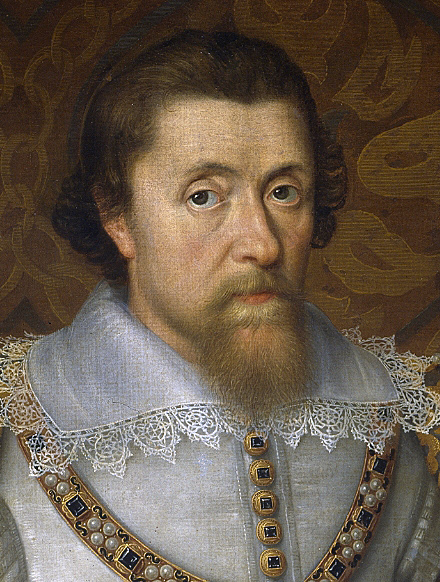
The recently-crowned James I of England granted the earls generous peace terms.

Despite their peace terms, the confederates' defeat in the Nine Years' War had a profound effect on Gaelic culture. The Gaelic succession system of tanistry was replaced with primogeniture and Irish lords were forced to renounce their Gaelic titles. (Note: Although Rory was Hugh Roe's tanist (appointed heir), his adherence to these terms is why he was never traditionally inaugurated as O'Donnell clan chief. His cousin and rival Niall Garbh O'Donnell instead took the opportunity to have himself inaugurated as clan chief in April 1603.) These legal changes, which essentially replaced the Gaelic legal system with English common law, led to a prominent land rights dispute between Tyrone and his principal sub-chief (and son-in-law) Donnell Ballagh O'Cahan. Customarily in Gaelic society, powerful chiefs granted portions of their land to sub-chiefs (Irish: uirríthe) in return for protection payments. The often-tense relations between these chiefs were exploited by the government to weaken the Gaelic nobility. O'Cahan faced near-famine conditions towards the end of the war; he surrendered to English commander Henry Docwra in July 1602, relinquishing a third of his territory to the Crown under the promise that he would retain the remaining two-thirds under English law. O'Cahan's surrender critically weakened Tyrone's position and created animosity between the two men. When Tyrone surrendered at Mellifont, he negotiated with Mountjoy to retain ownership of O'Cahan's territory, overruling Docwra's promise. O'Cahan was further frustrated when Tyrone imposed various levies and taxes on the land to rebuild his wealth. O'Cahan was forced to yield a third of his lands to Tyrone. Neither man was satisfied with their circumstances as all of the castles on the disputed land remained in government hands.

=== Hostility from officials ===
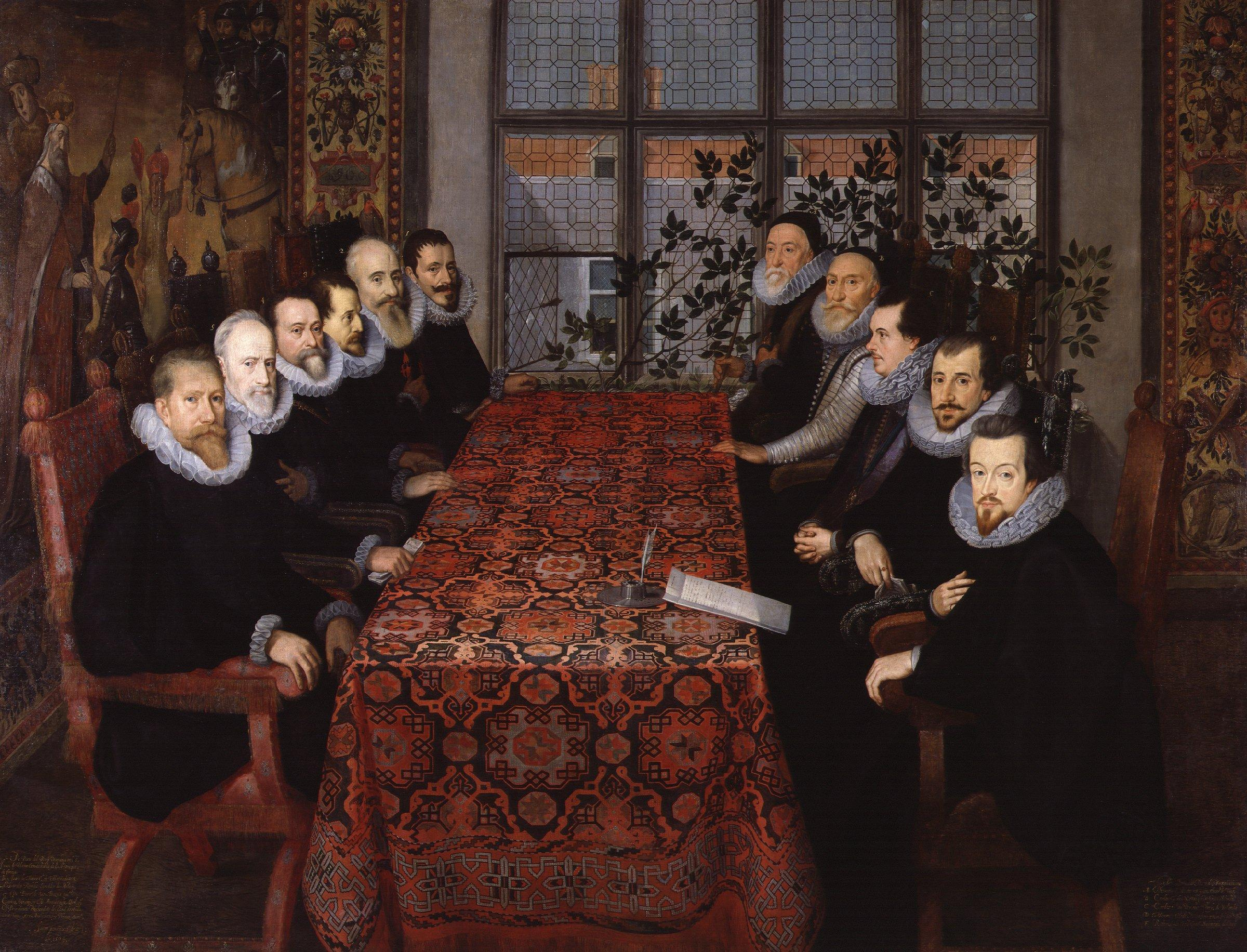
The Somerset House Conference, 1604 depicts the Anglo-Spanish peace negotiations resulting in the Treaty of London. The Count of Villamediana is on the left, second from the window. Baron Mountjoy is on the right, third from the window.

It was initially easy for Tyrone to rebuild his estates due to the lackluster government of the new Lord Deputy, George Carey. He used his new patent to claim absolute ownership over his earldom and reduce the landholdings of other O'Neill clansmen. Both Tyrone and Tyrconnell sought to acquire Catholic abbeys on their land. Tyrone did not lose contact with Spain nor the hope that Anglo-Spanish conflict would renew. (Note: Following Hugh Roe O'Donnell's death, his confessor Florence Conroy continued to pressure Philip III for send military resources. Conroy sailed from A Coruña in April 1603 with two ships carrying arms to Ireland, but he arrived after the Treaty of Mellifont had been signed. Conroy did not disembark and returned to Spain.) He wrote to Philip III in summer 1603, offering to take up arms for Spain if Anglo-Spanish peace negotiations failed. Despite these hopes, the Anglo-Spanish War ended in August 1604 with the signing of the Treaty of London. The Spanish government was hamstrung by bankruptcy and, as early as December 1602, did not want to provoke further conflict with England.

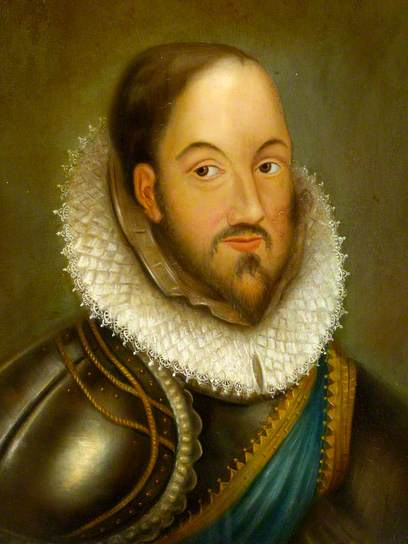
Lord Deputy Arthur Chichester's animosity towards the Gaelic lords, particularly Tyrone, was a major contributing factor to the Flight.

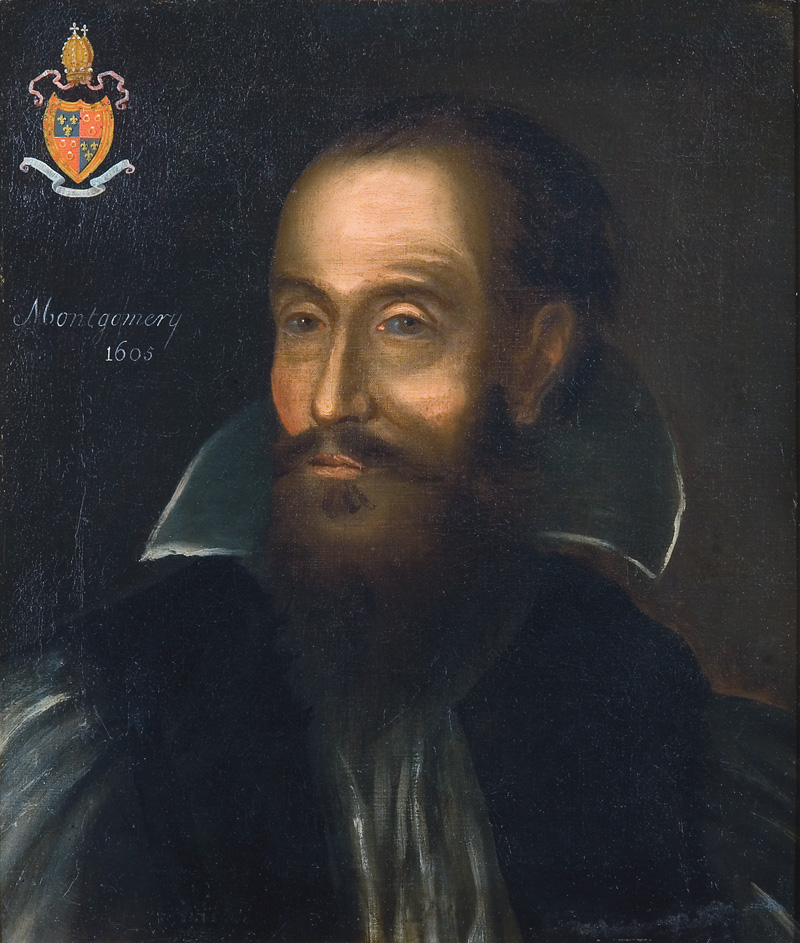
Bishop George Montgomery encouraged O'Cahan to renew his lawsuit against his father-in-law Tyrone and to leave his wife.

Many English politicians and soldiers, who had fought against Tyrone in the war, went to great lengths to convince authorities that Tyrone was untrustworthy and required adequate punishment for his continued treachery. Arthur Chichester, who became Lord Deputy in February 1605, had an aggressive attitude towards the Gaelic lords. He abolished the Gaelic feudal system, making sub-chiefs into freeholders with new legal rights. In October he banned Catholic clergy from Ireland and forced the population to attend Protestant church services. Additionally the discovery of the Gunpowder Plot in late 1605 led to an increase in the severity of anti-Catholic laws. Tyrone's marriage became strained over his diminishing social position, and in December 1605 he considered divorcing his wife Catherine. Chichester sent officer Toby Caulfeild to recruit Catherine as a double agent, but she dismissed this out of hand. Tyrone was protected to an extent by Mountjoy's influence over the Irish Privy Council, but this support was lost when Mountjoy died in April 1606.

Chichester began to work with John Davies, the Attorney-General for Ireland, to accuse Tyrone of treason. Despite their attempts, no hard evidence could be found. Chichester arrested and held Cuchonnacht Maguire, Maguire clan chief and a staunch supporter of Tyrone, for questioning. Other officials harnessed O'Cahan's hostility to orchestrate Tyrone's undoing. George Montgomery, the new Bishop of Derry, encouraged O'Cahan to renew his lawsuit. Montgomery also encouraged O'Cahan to leave his wife (Tyrone's daughter Rose), (Note: In recognition of his subordinate status to the O'Neill clan, once O'Cahan acceded to his clan's chieftaincy in 1598, he left his wife Mary and married Tyrone's daughter Rose.) noting that "the breach between [O'Cahan] and his landlord [Tyrone] will be the greater by means of [Tyrone's] daughter". In March 1607 O'Cahan repudiated his marriage (though he retained Rose's dowry, against Tyrone's will) and before the end of the year he remarried to another woman.

O'Cahan received a loan from Thomas Ridgeway, 1st Earl of Londonderry, to fund his case, and also had Davies acting as his counsel. (Note: Tyrone particularly dislike Davies, calling him "a man more fit to be a stage player than a counsel".) Davies hoped the case would set a precedent. In May 1607, the trial came before the Privy Council. Tyrone lost his temper, snatching a document from O'Cahan's hands and tearing it up in front of Chichester. Montgomery reported that Tyrone's men attempted to seize O'Cahan on his way to Dublin to attend the case's ruling. The council decreed that two-thirds of the lands should remain in O'Cahan's possession. It became clear to Tyrone that the restoration of his earldom meant little, and in a letter to the king he requested new letters patent to the disputed lands. In mid-July, Tyrone was ordered to present himself in London at the beginning of Michaelmas term (late September) to have ownership of the remaining land settled by the king.

...there are so many that seek to despoil me of the greatest part of the residue which Your Majesty was pleased I should hold, as without Your Highness' special consideration of me I shall in the end have nothing to support my estate, for [Montgomery], not contented with the great living Your Majesty has been pleased to bestow on him, seeketh not only to have from me unto him a great part of my lands... but also setteth on others...

— Tyrone to James I, in a letter dated 5 June [O.S. 26 May] 1607

Tyrone was not the only Irish lord frustrated with the English-led administration. The Earl of Tyrconnell was discontented that his new royal grant did not include the lands of his sub-chief Cahir O'Doherty in Inishowen, nor Lifford ("the only jewel" which he had) which was given to his cousin and rival Niall Garbh O'Donnell. Tyrconnell struggled to transition from the role of a Gaelic warlord to an Irish peer, which led to financial difficulties. (Note: It is possible that by 1606 Tyrconnell was about £3,000 in debt, which is equivalent to about £756,000 in 2024. His income may have been as little as £300 per year, equivalent to about £75,000 in 2024.) By 1604, Niall Garbh's power had grown to the extent that Tyrconnell was forced to flee to the Pale. Evidence suggests that Tyrconnell was the target of an earlier weaponised campaign under Carey's deputyship. Tyrconnell alleged that he had narrowly escaped assassination from Chichester's confidant Oliver Lambert in Boyle. He later alleged that Irishman Tadhg O'Corkran had been tortured for five days on Chichester's orders to secure incriminating testimony against him. Tyrconnell became bitter and began plotting against the Crown.

== Plot ==
=== Tyrconnell's plotting ===
In December 1604, Tyrconnell indicated to the Spanish ambassador in London (Juan de Tassis, 1st Count of Villamediana) that if the political situation remained the same for two years, confederates would "embark [and] leave their country" to meet with Philip III. The ambassador gave no encouragement and emphasised that Philip III did not want to provoke conflict with England. It is possible that Tyrconnell was merely bargaining for financial aid, as in February 1606 his secretary stated that the earls preferred to receive aid in the form of a Spanish pension rather than a meeting at the Spanish court.

In 1606, Tyrconnell and Cuchonnacht Maguire made a failed attempt to flee the country in a boat at Killybegs. Shortly afterwards, Tyrconnell and Chichester attended a "tense" supper in Ballyshannon Castle. Tyrconnell complained that the castle and its fishing grounds, which the Crown had taken from the O'Donnell clan, were worth £800 a year; Chichester reportedly told Tyrconnell to "take heed of himself, or else he would make his [head] ache". On a trip to Maynooth in 1607, Tyrconnell spoke of a plot against the English government during a conversation with Richard Nugent, Baron Delvin.

=== Allegations from Howth ===
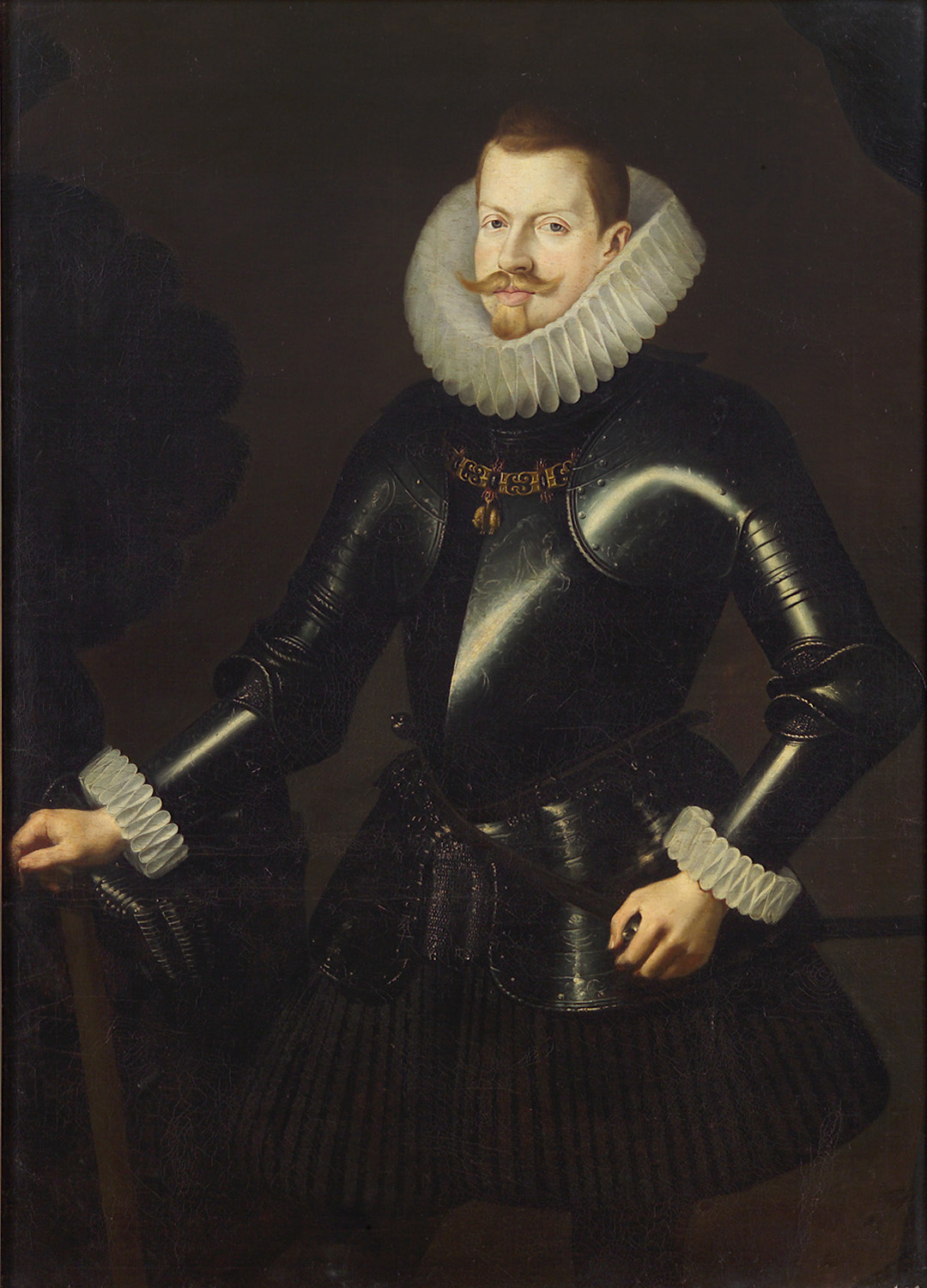
The earls hoped that Philip III of Spain would assist them, as he had done in the Nine Years' War, but Philip III did not want to risk renewing Anglo-Spanish conflict.

In early summer 1607, Anglo-Irish statesman Baron Howth, having returned from the Low Countries, alerted Chichester and the 1st Earl of Salisbury to the existence of a treasonous Catholic league. Howth implicated Tyrconnell and Delvin in "a general revolt intended by many of the nobility and principal persons of this land, together with the cities and towns of the greatest strength; and that they will shake off the yoke of the English government, as they term it, and adhere to the Spaniard". Howth couldn't prove Tyrone's involvement, but was assured from his exchanges with insiders that Tyrone was a key figure in the league. Howth also claimed that Fr. Florence Conroy, who had received funding from Philip III, was travelling to Ireland to notify the league of an impending Spanish expedition. Chichester was alarmed by this news but doubted the veracity of Howth's information. Salisbury appears not to have taken Howth's claims seriously; on 22 July 1607, Salisbury and the Privy Council wrote that it was "not worthy to draw on the King to any sudden action; because first it might alarm the Irish..." Chichester was told that he should have "rectified a little the strong discontent of the towns and others now boiling in their hearts... Their loyalty would then be confirmed and the less would be their jealousy if there were occasion to lay hold of any persons of rank".

Historians disagree on whether an Irish conspiracy existed. By contrasting Howth's accusations with Tyrone's own account, it is apparent that Howth's claims were exaggerated in certain respects. The historian Micheline Kerney Walsh stated Tyrone's records confirm the existence of this Catholic league, which included many Irish elites, which planned to occupy certain strongholds in Ireland once Spanish assistance arrived. Howth stated that Philip III had promised military resources to the league, but from surviving Hispano-Irish correspondence it is clear that Philip III had not been appealed to regarding the league until after the Flight.

=== Irish reaction ===
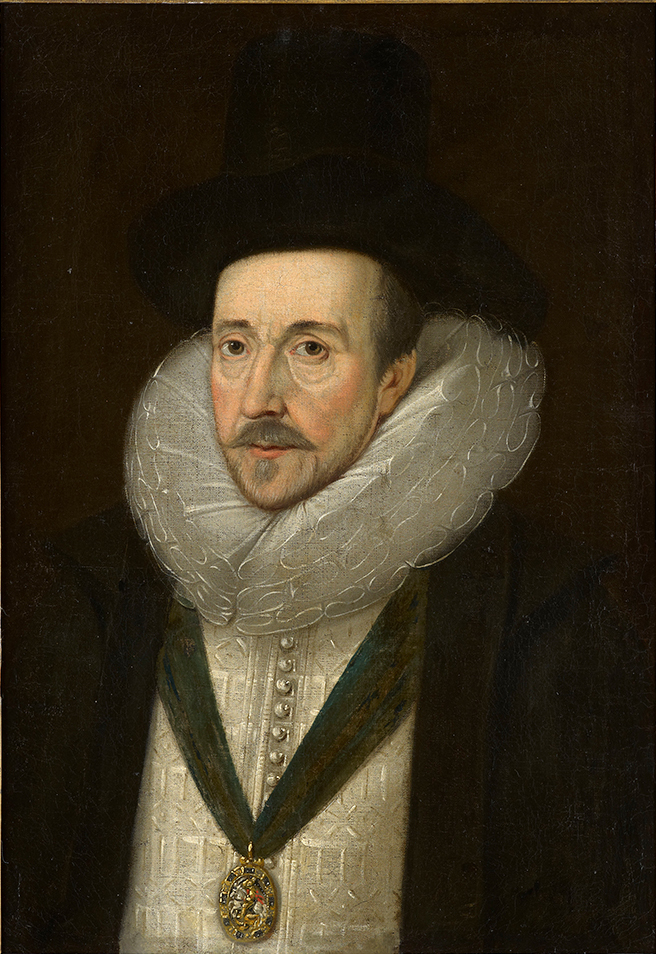
It is possible that Henry Howard, 1st Earl of Northampton, alerted the earls that they might face arrest in England.

Tyrone learnt that the government intended to imprison him, or possibly execute him, once he got to London. Kerney Walsh proposed that Tyrone probably received this news at the same time he was ordered to London (mid-July), as Chichester noted "since [Tyrone] received His Majesty's letter for his repair thither, he did lose his former cheerfulness and grew often exceedingly pensive". Tyrone and Tyrconnell later declared in correspondence with Spain that this intelligence came from "intimate friends of theirs on the King's very Council", codenamed "el Cid", "Rodan" and "Malgesi". Of these three friends, only the identity of "el Cid"—Henry Howard, Earl of Northampton—is known. The exact cause of the flight is a matter of controversy among historians. Kerney Walsh and John McCavitt state Tyrone certainly believed that his arrest was imminent. The earls had written to Philip III in February 1606 that they were "in danger every moment of losing their lives". Chichester later confirmed that he planned to arrest Tyrconnell on his next visit to Maynooth. McCavitt argued that Tyrone's arrest was "far from inevitable".

The Franciscan friar Thomas Fitzgerald was arrested for his involvement in the Flight and was subsequently questioned at Dublin Castle on 13 October [O.S. 3 October] 1607. Fitzgerald stated that "five or six months" previously, the earls were "fearful to be taken or sent for into England" and so sent seaman John Rath into Spain to seek assistance from Philip III. However the Spanish king rejected the earls' pleas, stating he would "rather have them go into England than come unto him". Soon after this, Tyrone was ordered to London. With circumstances changed, an "ensign" was sent from the Spanish Netherlands to "be in readiness to attend the coming of a ship, which should be sent for them soon after".

Cuchonnacht Maguire left Ireland for the Spanish Netherlands in late May 1607. According to reports, Maguire disguised himself as a French mariner and leased an 80-ton warship at Nantes in France. He may have had assistance from Tyrone's son Henry, who was colonel of the first Irish regiment (tercio) in the Spanish army. Maguire dressed the vessel as a fishing ship by filling it with wines and nets. It sailed from Dunkirk and anchored at Lough Swilly on 4 September [O.S. 25 August]. Maguire, Rath, Tyrconnell's secretary Matthew Tully and nobleman Donagh O'Brien were aboard.

Tyrconnell appears to be the first to learn of the vessel's arrival. Tyrone was at Slane with Chichester on 6 September [O.S. 27 August] when the news reached him. He seemed to have come to an immediate snap decision, and left for Mellifont two days later. John Davies recollected that Tyrone left Slane in an unusually solemn manner, farewelling every servant and child in the house.

== Journey ==
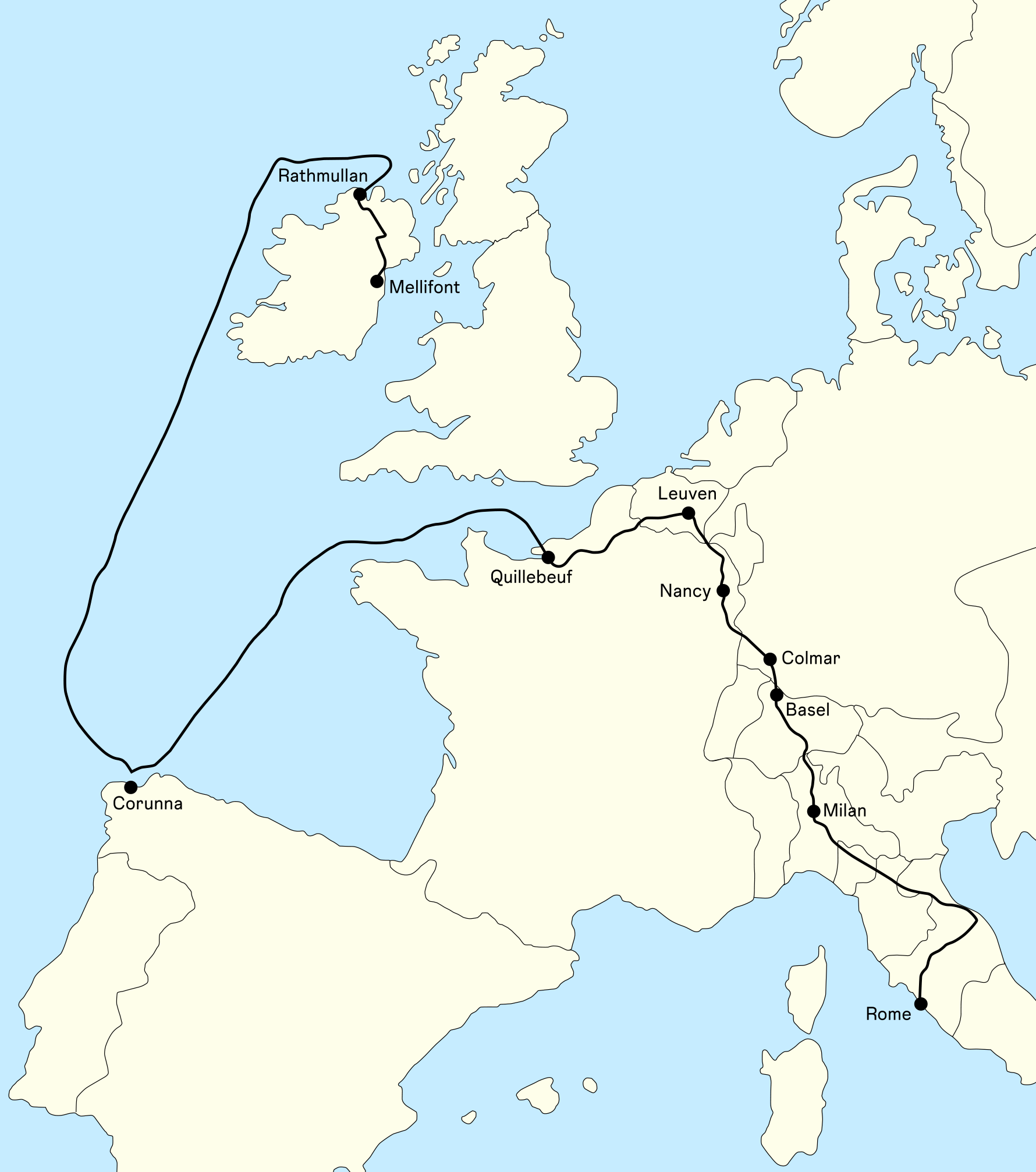
The earls' journey through Europe

=== Leaving Ireland ===
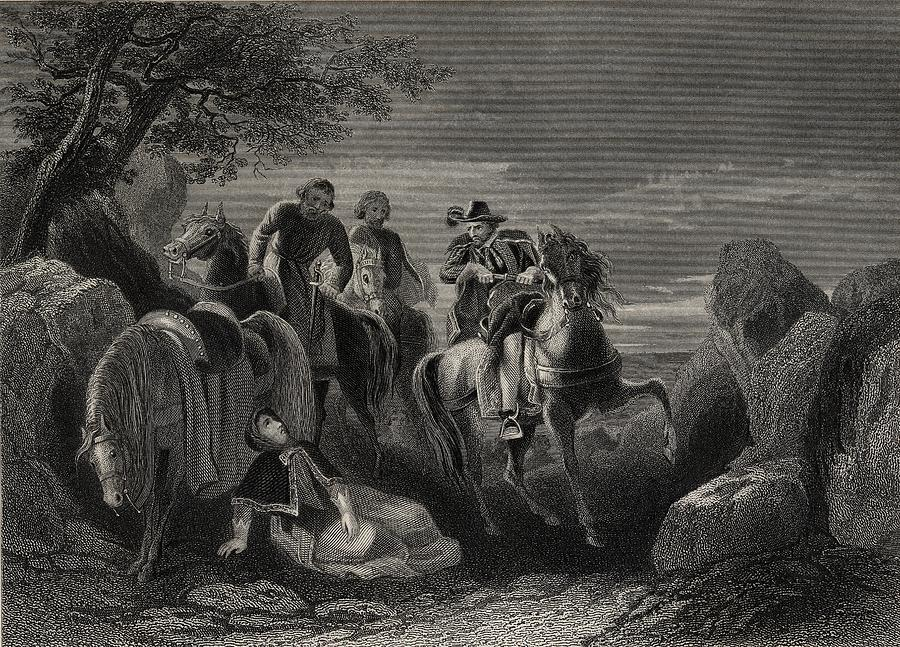
19th-century engraving of Tyrone coercing his wife Catherine to depart Ireland

Once both earls had decided to leave the country, they rushed to gather their family members. On the afternoon of 9 September [O.S. 30 August], Tyrone left Mellifont with his son Shane, who had been living there with the family of politician Garret Moore. Tyrone travelled through Dundalk, Silverbridge, Armagh, Dungannon, and on 10 September [O.S. 31 August] reached the "Craobh", an "island habitation" near Stewartstown, where he stayed for two nights. It is possible Tyrone's wife Catherine and son Brian were living there and that this time was spent preparing for their departure. His five-year-old son Conn, who was staying with his foster family in a far-off part of the country, was left behind due to time constraints, to Catherine's distress. (Note: Conn was taken into the custody of Toby Caulfeild, 1st Baron Caulfeild, and raised as a "good Englishman". In 1622, Conn was committed to the Tower of London, where he presumably died.) According to an English account, Catherine "being exceedingly weary slipped down from her horse and weeping said she could go no further." Tyrone responded by threatening her with his sword "if she would not pass on with him and put on a more cheerful countenance". Tyrone was also accompanied by his son and heir Hugh O'Neill, 4th Baron Dungannon; as a result, advanced plans to marry Dungannon to a daughter of the Earl of Argyll were abruptly abandoned.

At midday on 13 September [O.S. 3 September], Tyrone and his family arrived at the home of Tyrconnell's brother Caffar in Ballindrait. Caffar (and presumably his wife Rosa) joined the group as they continued their journey that night. Tyrconnell's sister Nuala was the eldest of the three noblewomen to join the Flight, and may have been the only one to go by her own choice, as she had long been separated from her husband Niall Garbh O'Donnell. Caffar quickly rode to intercept his infant son Hugh and the foster-father on the road to Ramelton, "violently" seizing the child. The group crossed the River Foyle and reached Ramelton at daybreak the following day. They finally reached Rathmullan, (Note: McCavitt noted that the infamous kidnapping of Tyrconnell's brother Hugh Roe O'Donnell took place at Rathmullan in September 1587, almost exactly 20 years earlier. Both events involved a hired ship masquerading its true purpose, and had a major negative effect on Gaelic Irish people in Ulster.) a seaside village on Lough Swilly, where Tyrconnell was waiting for them. The ship had been docked at Rathmullan for over a week by then, but the crew finished packing supplies only when the earls boarded, perhaps to avoid suspicion.

At about midday on 14 September [O.S. 4 September], (Note: The Feast of the Holy Cross is celebrated on this date.) the earls embarked from Rathmullan for A Coruña in Spain. They were accompanied by about 100 passengers, which included their families, domestic workers, retinue, clergymen, followers and other aristocrats. Most of the passengers were Gaels from Ulster, though there were also many passengers of Old English heritage. The crew comprised French, Spanish and Flemish sailors. Notably, Tyrone's footman Pedro Blanco was leaving Ireland for the first time since he had arrived in 1588 as a seaman on the Spanish Armada. In the earls' hurry to depart, their horses were left alone on the shore.

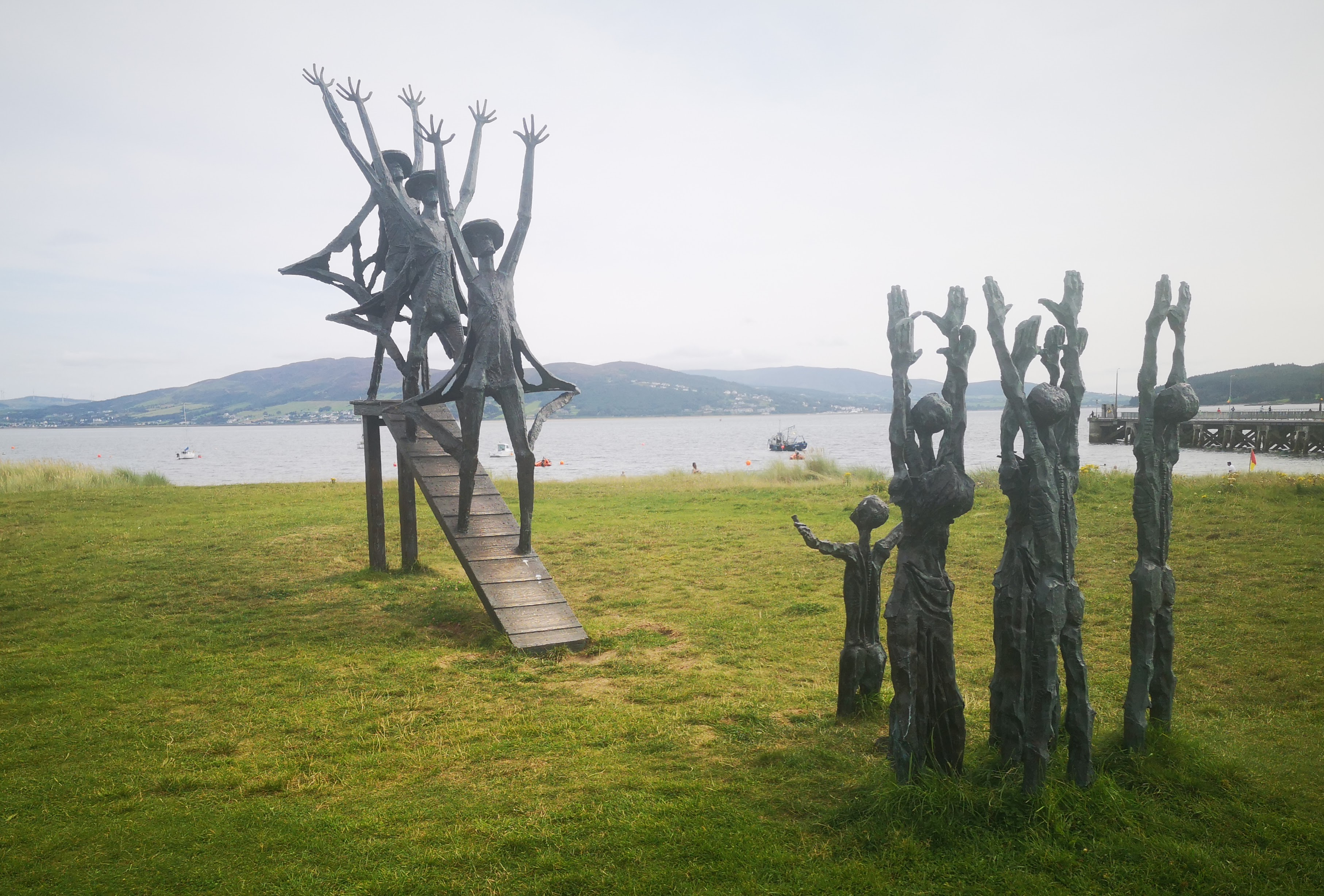
Flight of the Earls (2007) by John Behan. The bronze sculpture in Rathmullan commemorates the Flight's 400th anniversary.

In addition to Tyrone's son Conn, many of the earls' family members remained in Ireland. Tyrconnell's teenage wife Bridget was in the last month of her pregnancy, and was staying at her grandmother's Maynooth estate when she learned of her husband's departure. Tyrconnell later explained via a messenger that his flight was not "for want of love... if [he] had known sooner of his going, he would have taken [Bridget] with him." He expected Bridget to escape to the continent soon afterwards, but she cooperated with English authorities and never saw her husband again. Bridget gave birth to Tyrconnell's only daughter, Mary, and later remarried to Nicholas Barnewall, 1st Viscount Barnewall. Caffar attempted to bring his illegitimate son Caffar Oge "Con" on the Flight, but Con's foster-father made off with the child. Tyrone's brother Cormac MacBaron O'Neill also remained in Ireland, though his sons Art Oge and Brian took part in the Flight. By the end of the war, Cormac and Tyrone's relationship had become frayed. The historian John McGurk suggested that Cormac had become a political rival to his brother. On 15 September, Cormac travelled to Dublin to inform Chichester of the earls' departure and to petition for a custodiam of Tyrone's estates. Chichester was suspicious that Cormac took a full day to confer this news. Cormac was arrested and imprisoned in the Tower of London, where he later died. Kerney Walsh, who argued that the Flight was a tactical retreat, stated that Cormac's absence from the Flight was probably pre-arranged with Tyrone, so he could prepare Ireland for the anticipated Spanish expedition. Cormac was married to Tyrconnell's sister Margaret; she and her youngest son Conn made their own way to the Spanish Netherlands.

=== At sea ===
The first night "was bright, quiet and calm, with a breeze from the south-west". The émigrés considered putting in to Arranmore to source more food and drink, but a strong storm blew the ship away from shore. They set a course past Sligo and straight ahead until Croagh Patrick.

The ship's crew were not familiar with this part of the sea. At midday on 17 September, the émigrés approached three large Scandinavian ships, returning from Spain, for directions. Fearing that a royal fleet at Galway might intercept them, the émigrés sailed further out into the Atlantic to make a clearer path to Spain. The difficult voyage was plagued by strong winds, rough seas and cramped conditions. After thirteen days at sea, the émigrés trailed relics in the water behind the ship to provide relief from the storms. Tyrone had a gold cross which contained a relic of the True Cross, possibly taken from a visit to Holy Cross Abbey in 1601. A journey from Rathmullan to A Coruña should have taken only four or five days, but it had been sixteen days when the émigrés neared the Spanish coast on 30 September. The wind began to blow against them, making it impossible to sail towards Spain. The ship was thrust up the English Channel and past the Channel Islands. In acceptance of the poor weather and their dwindling food supply, the émigrés tried to reach Le Croisic in France.

=== France and Spanish Netherlands ===
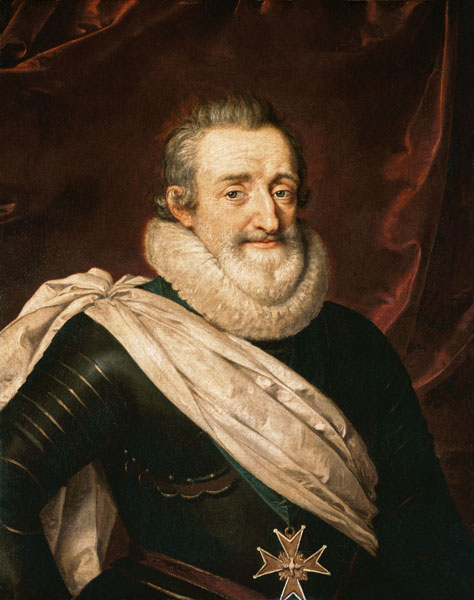
Henry IV of France considered Tyrone to be the third greatest general of his time (after himself and the Count of Fuentes).

When the émigrés finally disembarked in Quillebeuf-sur-Seine, France, on 4 October, less than one barrel of drinking water remained. A day later the women and children were sent with their luggage on a boat up the Seine to Rouen. Quillebeuf's governor entertained Tyrone at dinner, but would not allow the earls to continue their journey without permission from King Henry IV. In the meantime George Carew, the English ambassador in Paris, attempted to have the earls arrested. Henry IV, who considered Tyrone to be one of the greatest generals in Europe, refused English demands to hand over the earls and—though denying them from proceeding to Spain—permitted them passage through northern France to the Spanish Netherlands.

The main group including Tyrone and Tyrconnell went with 17 men on horseback to La Bouille. The following day, the group were detained and taken to Lisieux. There, they were received by the town's Marshal. The two groups' separation caused confusion. The Marshal wrote to Henry IV inquiring on what should be done with the group. Carew was in Lisieux and learnt that Henry IV granted the Irish group free passage. He dispatched a messenger to England to inform James I that the earls had arrived in France. The group travelled north-east to the Spanish Netherlands, rather than south to Spain. On 15 October, the whole group left from Rouen—31 individuals on horseback, two coaches, three wagons and about 40 individuals travelled on foot. Tyrone's son Henry needed to obtain a warrant to allow the earls to travel to Spain. The group paid the local governor for the warrant with around 40 tons of salt, which had been brought on their ship. The earls were impressed by Rouen's strong Catholic culture (it had 33 parish churches and 14 monasteries) and fertile land. The group travelled fifteen miles to the commune La Boissière, where their lodgings were below par. The next day, 16 October, they reached Neufchatel where they attended Mass and had dinner. They went on to Aumale, then Poix.

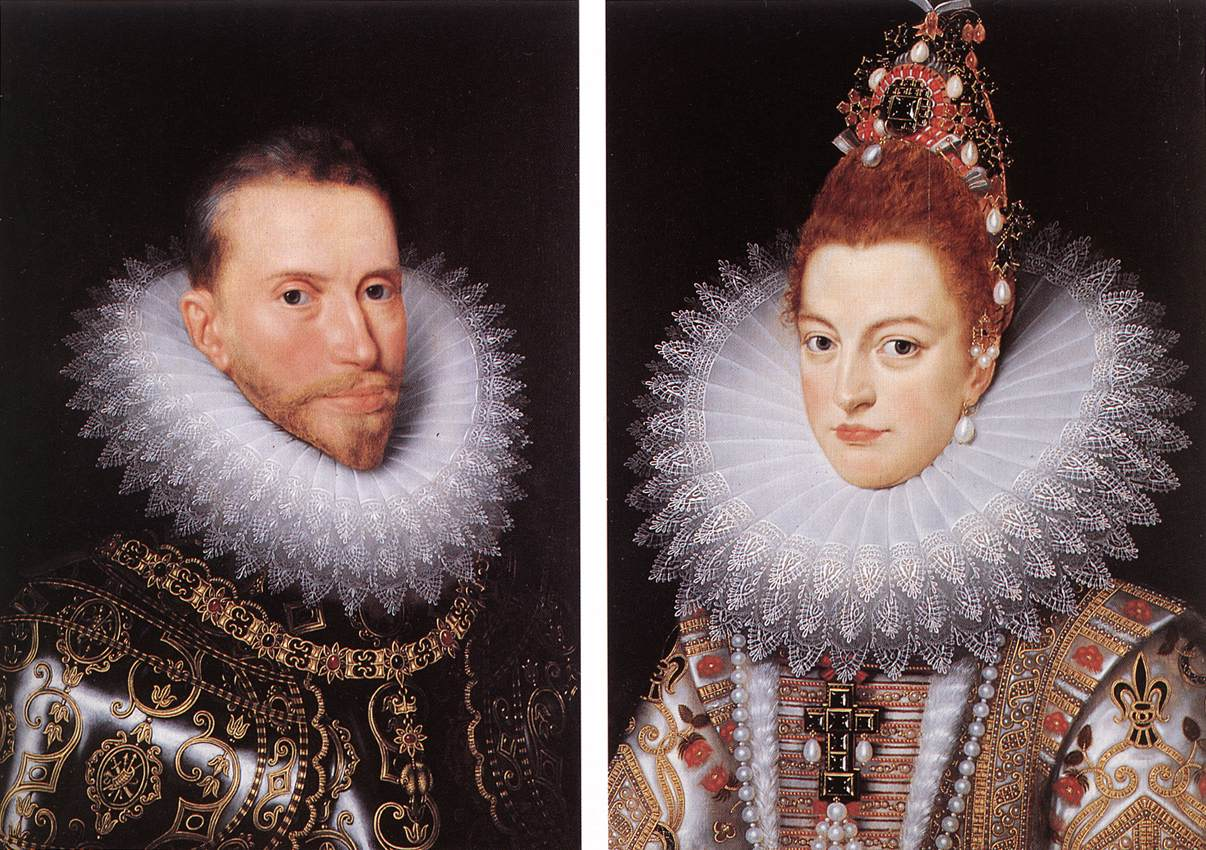
Portraits of the joint sovereigns of the Spanish Netherlands: Albert VII, Archduke of Austria and Isabella Clara Eugenia

The group reached Amiens, where they visited Amiens Cathedral and saw the reputed head of John the Baptist. They continued on to the village of Contay. On 18 October, they met Irish clergyman Eugene Matthews at Arras. The earls reached Douai on 22 October, where two Catholic seminaries (an Irish college and an English college) had been established. The earls were celebrated as Catholic heroes by the students, and on 23 October they were entertained with a banquet. The distinguished Irish Franciscans Florence Conroy and Robert Chamberlain travelled to Douai to meet the earls. Conroy joined the earls' group on their journey.

After three days in Douai, the group set out for Tournai. They stopped at a small village overnight, where they saw the tomb of St Linard. The following day they continued on to Tournai on the river Scheldt. From Tournai, Tyrone wrote to the Papal Nuncio at Brussels, Archbishop Guido Bentivoglio, describing the circumstances of his escape from Ireland. This was perhaps on Conroy and Chamberlain's advice. On 28 October the group arrived in Ath, and the next day they passed through Enghien and arrived in Notre Dame de Halle. Tyrone met his son Henry at Halle; his regiment was then quartered in the Bruges district. On 3 November, the earls met Ambrogio Spinola, a general in the Spanish army who had travelled from Brussels to Halle to meet them. He invited the earls to dinner. The next day the earls attended mass. They set out in coaches (others accompanied them on horseback) to Nivelles where that evening they were entertained with music and dance.

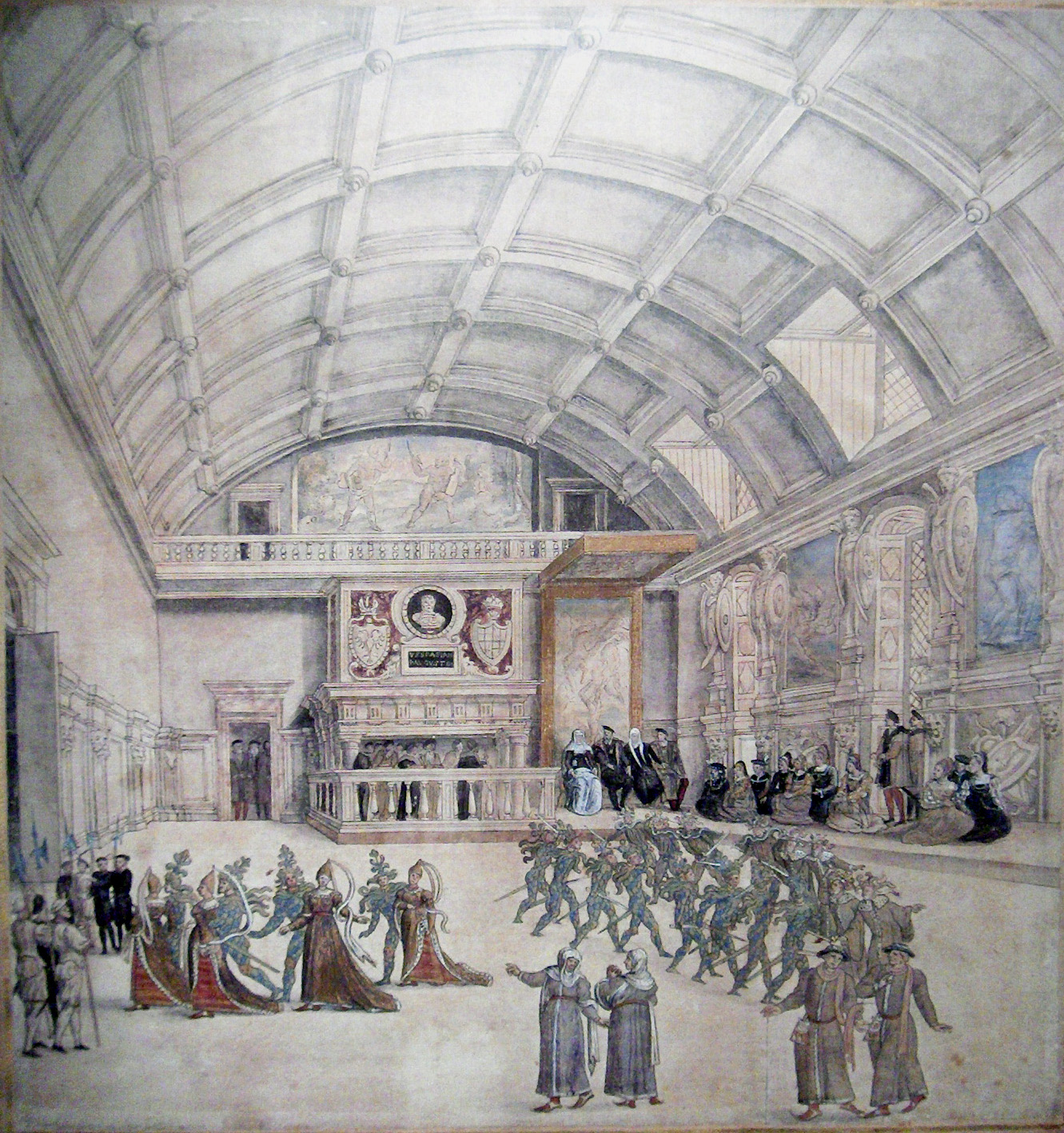
The earls met and dined with Albert VII and Isabella at Binche Palace.

The earls travelled to Binche on 5 November; they were greeted by the Netherlands' sovereigns Albert VII, Archduke of Austria, and Isabella Clara Eugenia at the entrance to Binche Palace. Present at the meeting was Don Rodrigo de Laiso, who had survived a Spanish Armada shipwreck in Ireland. The historian Tomás Ó Fiaich noted that the atmosphere must have been tense; Tyrone's secretary Henry Hovenden, who killed 300 of Laiso's comrades on Tyrone's orders, was also present at the meeting. Additionally Tyrconnell's father Hugh McManus had offered the survivors, which included Laiso, to British authorities. They all dined, then the earls returned to Nivelles.

The group spent the following night at Halle. They continued to Brussels where they were met by Colonel Francisco and "a party of Irish, Spanish, Italian and Flemish captains". At Ambrogio Spinola's palace they were welcomed by Spinola, the papal nuncio and the Spanish ambassador. They all spent time conversing, before Spinola seated them for dinner. Tyrone was seated at the head of the table, the place of honour at the lavish feast, with Tyrconnell seated at his side. (Note: Cuchonnacht Maguire, the Duke of Aumale and Tyrone's children also attended the dinner.)

=== Leuven ===
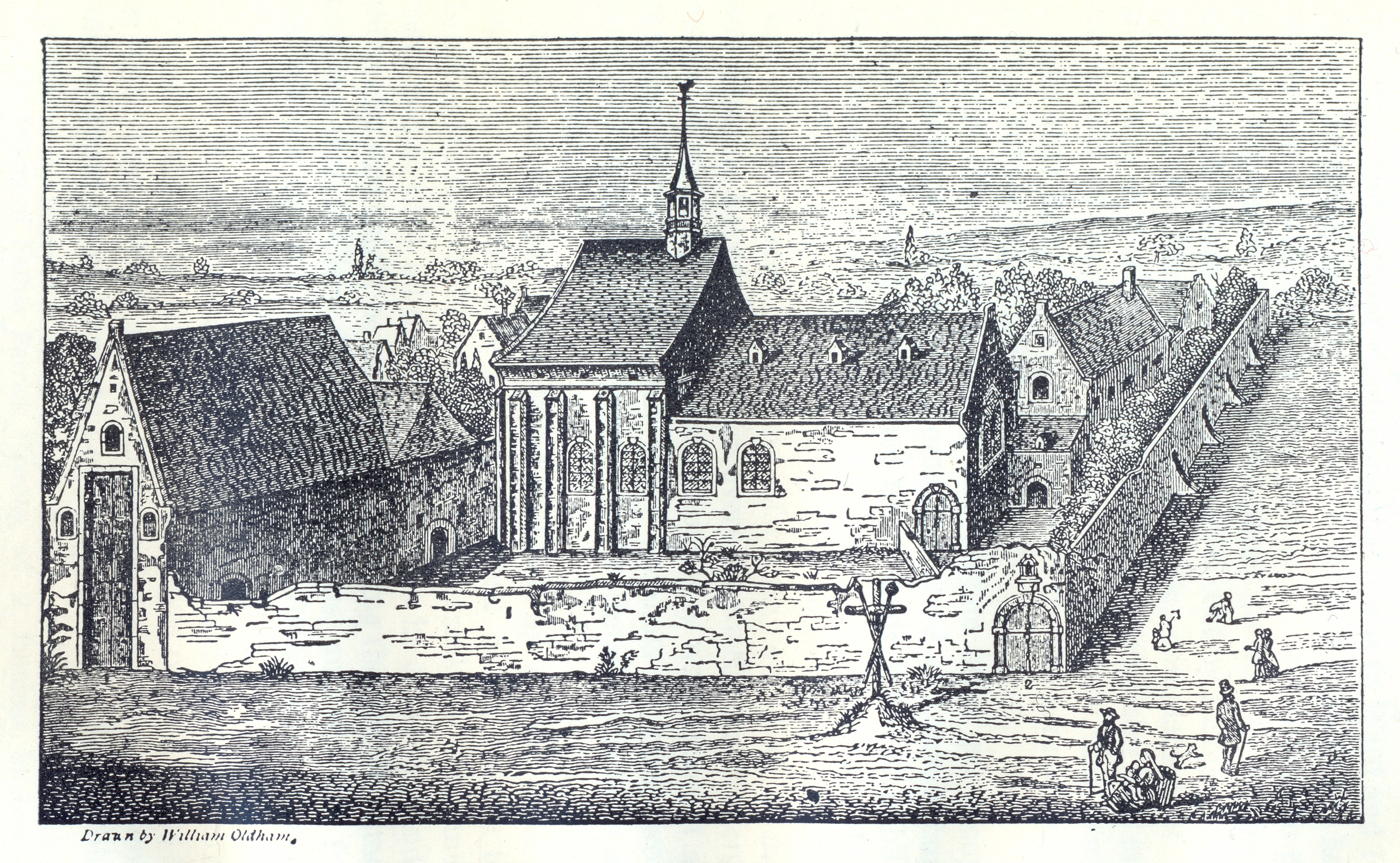
18th century depiction of St Anthony's College, Leuven, by William Oldham

The group reached Leuven on 9 November, where they stayed for ten days. Tyrone stayed in a hostel named "The Emperor's House". On 25 November, the group left the women and some of their attendants behind to set out for Spain with their retinue. Their intention was to reach Rome, where they would seek the Pope's blessing, then to sail to Spain from Genoa. They travelled to Jodoigne where they were met by a troupe of Albert VII's cavalry who escorted them to Perwez. The next day they reached Namur, where they received an order from Albert VII to return to Leuven and await further instructions. Philip III did not want the earls to enter Spain for fear of violating the Treaty of London. The group went to Wavre overnight and then back to Leuven.

The earls were forced to spend the winter at Leuven. It was a harsh winter with the Scheldt frozen over. In mid-December, the earls received news that Albert VII wanted them to leave his states. On 18 February 1608, the group went to Mechelen and on the following day to Antwerp, crossing the Scheldt as they did so (partly on horseback and partly via a boat). After visiting the Irish College in Antwerp and sightseeing other attractions, the group travelled to Willebroek and then the next day to Vilvoorde and back to Leuven.

Having failed to get Albert VII's permission to travel to Spain, the earls and their companions (now reduced to thirty-two people on horseback plus the women in a coach) left Leuven on 28 February 1608 to travel southwards. The nobles left their younger children behind in Leuven under the care of Irish Franciscans at St Anthony's College. These children include Tyrone's sons Shane and Brian, Caffar's son Hugh and Tyrconnell's son Hugh Albert.

=== To Rome ===
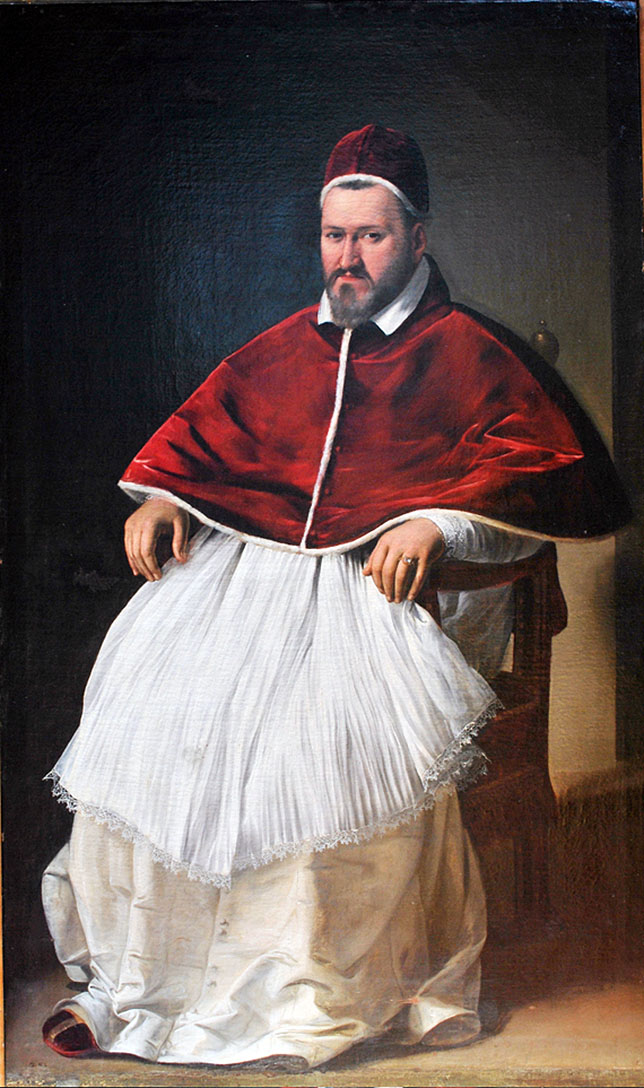
Pope Paul V supplied the earls with accommodation in Rome and a small pension.

The journey to Rome was arduous. The earls' group travelled to Namur along a poor quality road. The women left the coach behind and continued on horseback. On 4 March they travelled to Longwy and Fillières, and the next day to Malatur and Conflans. Two of their party almost drowned in a river they had to cross. The group stayed for two nights in Pont-à-Mousson, then crossed the Moselle and continued to Nancy. They left Nancy on 8 March. The group crossed the Mountain of St Martin by way of difficult roads that were covered with snow and ice. They arrived in Le Bonhomme, then continued on to Kaysersberg and Colmar. By 16 March the group reached Lucerne and crossed over Lake Lucerne; they reached Flüelen at midnight. (Note: In his account of the earls' journey, Tadhg Ó Cianáin referred to the town as "Flüelen Pourlacu", though it is unclear what the suffix "Pourlacu" means.) On Saint Patrick's Day, the group travelled through the Alps, passing over a gorge via a bridge called the Devil's Bridge. One of Tyrone's horses, which carried about £120, (Note: £120 in 1608 is equivalent to about £756,000 in 2024.) fell down the cliff face. Although the horse was recovered, the money was caught in a torrent. That night the group stayed the night in Piedimonte.

The following day's attempt to recover the money was unsuccessful. Meanwhile Tyrconnell continued over the Alps. The earls had to use sleighs drawn by oxen to cross the mountain. There was difficulty descending the icy roads on the way down. They went to Faido, meeting up with Tyrconnell. They subsequently continued through the Lugano valley to Capo di Lago. The group landed at Capolago, and despite stormy and wet weather, reached Como. They travelled along good quality roads to Milan, where they remained for three weeks.

In mid-April, the earls reached Parma, where they were shown many exotic beasts such as lions, leopards and camels. They then continued to Modena and then Bologna. The next day Tyrone met with the cardinal at Bologna. From there, the group travelled to Saint Nicholas and Castel San Pietro. The group then went to Imola, then to Loreto. On 23 April, the group set out from Loreto to finally get to Rome—whilst en route, some of the group (not including Tyrone) made a pilgrimage to Assisi. As the group got closer to Rome, they sent people ahead of them to Rome and were met by Peter Lombard, Archbishop of Armagh, at Ponte Milvio. On 29 April, Tyrone and Tyrconnell were welcomed into Rome by a large procession of cardinals. The earls met Pope Paul V the next day. The pope allowed the earls to reside at Palazzo Della Rovere on Borgo Vecchio, the Palazzo Salviati. and the Borgo Santo Spirito.

== Aftermath ==
=== Britain and Ireland ===
...the only ground and motive of this high contempt in these men's departure, hath been the private knowledge and inward terror of their own guiltiness...

— James I, A Proclamation touching the Earles of Tyrone and Tyrconnell, 25 November [O.S. 15 November] 1607

The government was at first confused and concerned by the earls' departure, fearing that they would return to Ireland with a foreign army. At that time, an earl was expected to have licence to travel to the Continent. Tyrconnell's involvement in treasonous action was not unexpected, but Tyrone's departure caused some panic in London. Chichester's first comment on the Flight was that it had been "long since thought-out and resolved" "'by some of the fugitives", but he "could never suspect" Tyrone "of so disloyal and shallow intention as this, considering his fortune, years, and experience". Davies proposed that Tyrone may have fled to Spain or London. In a proclamation dated 25 November [O.S. 15 November] 1607, James I publicly accused the earls of plotting a rebellion and declared the Flight as treasonous. English ambassadors on the Continent, such as Thomas Edmondes, made attempts to stop the earls' journey. At least one plan to assassinate Tyrone was brought to the attention of ambassador Henry Wotton, but James I had little interest in it, believing that the earls' loss of their estates was punishment enough.

The Flight opened a power vacuum in Ulster which Chichester felt should filled by a plantation scheme. On 27 September [O.S. 17 September] 1607, only thirteen days after the earls' departure, Chichester advocated for dividing Ulster's lands among the native Irish population, former soldiers and "colonies of civil people of England and Scotland at his Majesty's pleasure". Chichester and Davies toured Ulster during the summers of 1608 and 1609, heading commissions in each county to determine the Crown's title to the proposed plantation lands. The commissions judged that the lands belonging to Tyrone (County Tyrone and Oneilland in County Armagh) and Tyrconnell (County Donegal) were escheated to the Crown.

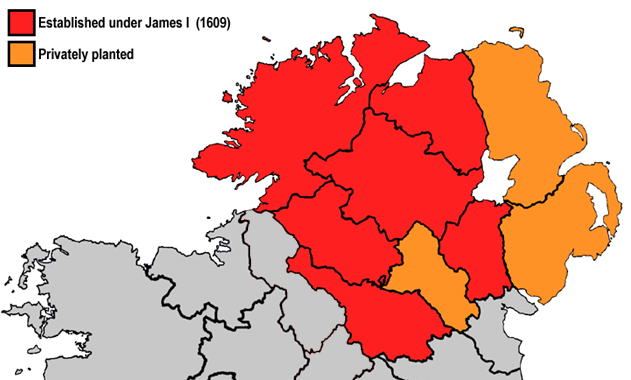
The counties of Ulster (modern boundaries) that were colonised during the plantations. The amount of land colonised did not cover the entire shaded area.

In the aftermath of Cahir O'Doherty's failed 1608 rebellion, a more detailed plantation strategy was developed. The rebellion also allowed the government to confiscate the lands of the rebels involved—Cahir O'Doherty and Niall Garbh O'Donnell—who had owned part of the O'Donnells' traditional lands. Additionally, Donnell Ballagh O'Cahan failed to comply with the government and was imprisoned on charges of treason. Tyrone's potential return to Ireland may have hurried plantation plans. Both of the earls' titles were formally attainted by the Parliament of Ireland on 7 November [O.S. 28 October] 1614.

John Davies compared the Flight to Saint Patrick who "did only banish the poisonous worms, but suffered the men full of poison to inhabit the land still." The Archbishop of Canterbury later stated "it was the best service that ever Irishman did to the crown of England, when Tyrone ran away and left well near the fourth part of Ireland to be new planted."

Chichester's plan prioritised British settlers over the Irish, so that the Irish "may be environed with seas, strongholds and powerful men to overstay them". His plan was to "utterly destroy the customs and practices of the natives" so that the next generation of Ulster's population would "in tongue and heart and every way else become English". Gaelic institutions went into decline; the Irish bardic poet Dáibhí Ó Bruadair (c. 1625–1698) wrote that the Irish nobility were "dispersed and scattered" and referred to his time as "the breaking of the old customs". The settlement of British Protestants in Ulster had a major impact on the province's predominantly Irish Catholic population and led to major sectarian conflict throughout the following centuries. (Note: Division between north and south Ireland is evident from at least 1616 with the contention of the bards. Subsequent sectarian conflicts in Ulster include the Irish Rebellion of 1641 and the Troubles.) By 1732, loyalist Protestants outnumbered Catholics in Ulster.

=== Continental Europe ===
The pope granted the earls a monthly pension of a hundred crowns. Philip III offered the collective sum of 700 ducats a month for the group of about 50 émigrés. The earls were displeased with the small size of their pension and their reduced lifestyles; they quickly found themselves in debt. Tyrone was formerly one of the richest lords in Ireland. He had brought his valuables and relics to the Continent, though he was obviously unable to quickly transplant the vast quantities of cows, sheep and hens which made up his fortune. Catherine became highly distressed by the Roman climate and her separation from her children, though Tyrone forbade her from relocating to Leuven. (Note: It has been suggested that Catherine had an affair with Robert Lombard (nephew of Peter Lombard, Archbishop of Armagh) during her time in Rome.)

The many passengers of the Flight did not realise they were taking part in "a moment of epic finality". In November 1607, a young man named St Leger expressed remorse for his participation in the Flight, stating he had been "blindfoldly, with many others, carried into this journey without knowing whither he went". Some passengers, such as John Rath and Seán Crón MacDaibhid, made efforts to reunite with their loved ones.

During his time in Rome, Tyrone attended papal ceremonies, visited catacombs and relics, ascended the Scala Santa on his knees, and made the traditional pilgrimage to the Seven Pilgrim Churches of Rome. Tyrone quickly became disillusioned with his exile and yearned to return to his position in Ireland. For the rest of his life, he did not give up the possibility of returning to Ireland. On 14 July 1608, the earls wrote to Philip III requesting increased support for Henry's Irish regiment. The Spanish Council of State carried out their request, showing that the earls still had some influence. Tyrconnell was clearly concerned for his son's safety, as he made requests to the staff at St Anthony's College for his son's supervision. (Note: His concerns may have been well-founded. In August 1617, Tyrone's 13-year-old son Brian was found dead in his bedroom in Brussels. He had been hanged with his hands tied behind his back.)

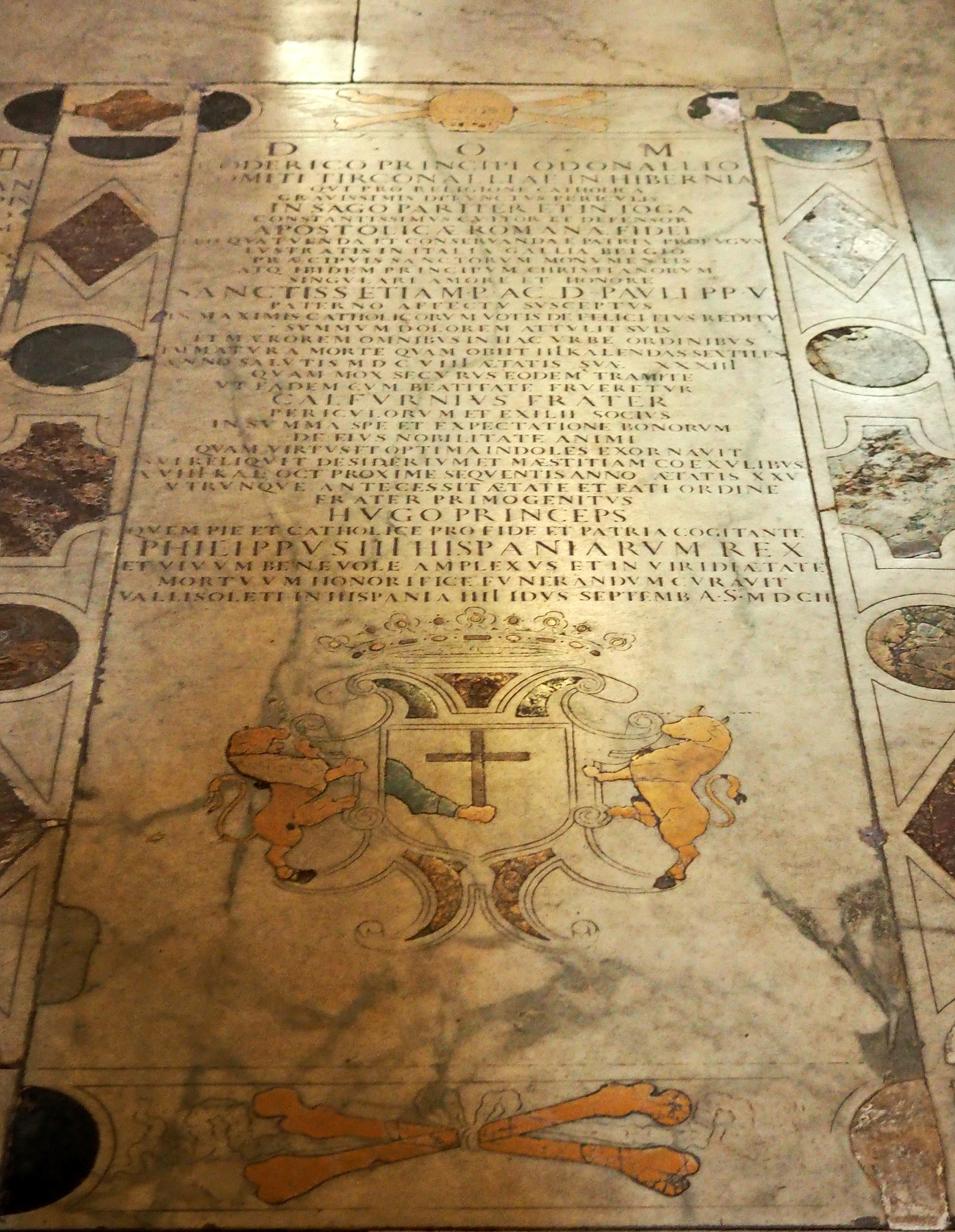
Tomb of Tyrconnell and his younger brother Caffar O'Donnell

In July 1608, Tyrconnell, Caffar and Dungannon travelled to Ostia, a coastal town fifteen miles west of Rome, for a holiday and "a change of air". Ostia's marshlands were ridden with mosquitoes, and after four days the young nobles became violently ill with fevers. Tyrconnell died in Rome on 28 July; Caffar and Dungannon subsequently died in 1608 and 1609 respectively. (Note: The deaths of Tyrconnell and Caffar led to a lengthy custody battle in the Netherlands over their sons, Hugh Albert and Hugh respectively.) All three men were buried in the church of San Pietro in Montorio. (Note: Henry Hovenden (Tyrone's secretary) was buried in San Pietro in Montorio in 1610. Other Irish émigrés who were likely buried there include Donal O'Carroll (Vicar General of Killaloe), Muiris (Tyrconnell's page) and John MacDavid (household staff member).) Tyrone could not afford to pay for his son's funeral, so it was funded by Spanish ambassador Francisco Ruiz de Castro. Cuchonnacht Maguire left Rome for Spain in June 1608, but he died of fever in Genoa on 12 August 1608.

Tyrone continued to petition Philip III for his assistance in retaking Ireland from British control (including during O'Doherty's rebellion), but had no success. English spies, who were monitoring Tyrone in Rome, reported that, after a good dinner, Tyrone liked to talk about the prospect of "a good day in Ireland". In 1613 the English Crown briefly discussed with Tyrone a potential reconciliation, but this fell apart when the political situation changed. Tyrone ceased his petitioning to Philip III by 1614 when he was threatened with losing his pension unless he remained silent. By this time, Tyrone was planning an ambitious return to Ireland with Spanish aid. In March 1615, he declared to Philip III that "rather than live in Rome, he would prefer to go to his land with a hundred soldiers and die there in defence of the Catholic faith and of his fatherland". In July he bemoaned that he would likely "die within four or six years" and he did not wish to die "without the consolation of dying fighting for my religion and the territories of my forebears".

It has been alleged that Tyrone became blind in his last years, but this is probably propaganda spread by Chichester. Tyrone became seriously ill in January 1616, and died in Rome on 20 July. His elaborate funeral was paid for by the Spanish ambassador and attended by cardinals, foreign ambassadors, and many Irish dignitaries living in Europe. Tyrone was also interred in San Pietro in Montorio. The Council of State remarked to Philip III that "as the Earl left no funds for his burial, Cardinal Borja spent what was necessary at the expense of the Embassy... but in doing this he endeavoured to cover such appearances as might cause difficulties in the relations of your Majesty with the King of England". This explains the brevity of the inscription on Tyrone's tomb. (Note: As the original tombstone was destroyed in 1849 during the Risorgimento, Tomás Ó Fiaich laid a new marble plaque with the same inscription in 1989. The tombstones belonging to Dungannon and the O'Donnells were narrowly rescued by the intervention of an Irish Dominican priest.) Tyrone's presence in Europe was a constant source of concern for the British government, and his death came as a welcome relief. His will did not sufficiently provide for Catherine; she died in Naples in March 1619.

The earls' sons continued to use their fathers' titles and integrated into Spanish society. Tyrone's son Shane was created the successive 3rd Earl of Tyrone ("Conde de Tyrone") in the Spanish nobility. Tyrconnell's son Hugh Albert succeeded as the 2nd Earl of Tyrconnell in 1608, and though the title was attainted in 1614, he continued to use it throughout his life, which was recognised by Spain. He was naturalised as a Spanish subject in 1633. When Anglo-Spanish conflict was revived from 1625 to 1630, both men were advocates of a proposed 1627 Spanish invasion of Ireland in order to liberate the island from English rule.

Shane and Hugh Albert coloneled Irish regiments (tercios) in the Spanish army. (Note: Cathbarr's son Hugh served as a captain in Shane's regiment.) This precipitated the Flight of the Wild Geese, where following the end of the Williamite War in 1691, Jacobite soldiers fled Ireland to serve in the French, Spanish, Russian, Polish, Swedish, Danish and Austrian armies in the 16th, 17th and 18th centuries. The Flight of the Earls thus marks the beginning of the modern Irish diaspora.

== Historiography ==
=== Contemporary analysis ===
Tadhg Ó Cianáin, a writer from a learned family attached to the Maguire clan, travelled with the earls from Rathmullan to Rome. Whilst living in Rome in 1609, he recorded an Irish-language eyewitness account of the journey for an audience of Franciscans at St Anthony's College. Ó Cianáin's manuscript is a unique and valuable source. He focuses on the earls' itinerary (listing the names of foreign places and dignitaries) and emphasises their connections with the international Catholic community. The title used by the Franciscans (Turas na nlarladh as Éire) indicates that the earl's journey was not yet perceived as an escape from danger, as the word turas means tour or pilgrimage. Ó Cianáin does not explain the reasons behind the earl's departure but also does not describe it as a "flight"—perhaps the intended readership did not require an explanation.

"Woe to the heart that meditated, woe to the mind that conceived, woe to the council that decided on, the project of their setting out on this voyage, without knowing whether they should ever return to their native principalities or patrimonies to the end of the world."

— Annals of the Four Masters

Tyrone's English contemporaries claimed that he fled in anticipation of the discovery of his treasonous plot. King James declared in his 1607 proclamation that there was never any intention of arresting the earls. Catholic apologists refuted this ex post facto statement.

=== 17th–18th century ===
Until the mid-19th century, most historians discussed the Flight in religious terms. Philip O'Sullivan Beare, in his work Historiae Catholicae Iberniae Compendium (1621), was first to claim that Tyrone fled Ireland due to a government plot to "cut down" the "leading men in the [Catholic] faith". Anglo-Irish writers John Temple and Edmund Borlase described the events of 1607 as a failed prototype version of the Irish Rebellion of 1641, which was religious in nature.

In Royal Genealogies (1737), James Anderson alleged that government minister Robert Cecil orchestrated the plot (this was related to the contemporary belief that Cecil orchestrated the Gunpowder Plot). In Civil Wars (1786), Catholic campaigner John Curry argued that the Irish plot was faked, and that it had been set up by the government via an anonymous letter. With this argument, Curry was refuting charges of Catholic disloyalty to the Crown. Curry popularised the term "Flight of the Earls". Though previous writers used the term to imply that the earls ran away from justice, Curry used it to emphasise that the earls were fleeing from danger. 18th-century Catholic historians depicted the Flight as a "flight from charges of complicity [in] a trumped-up plot". The belief that both Tyrone and the government were plotting against each other had few supporters.

=== 19th–early 20th century ===
Writers after the 19th century placed more emphasis on the political and legal situation in Ulster as motivation for Tyrone's departure (particularly John Davies's support of the O'Cahan legal case), though it was conceded that religion was a factor. Thomas Moore was the first to explore this in the fourth volume of his 1846 work History of Ireland. Charles Patrick Meehan's 1868 book The fate and fortunes of Hugh O'Neill, earl of Tyrone, and Rory O'Donel, earl of Tyrconnel was a major study on the motivations and effects of the Flight of the Earls. Meehan argued that the earls were not part of any treasonous Catholic plot, and that the claim originated from an anonymous letter sent by Baron Howth on Cecil's orders. Meehan was also responsible for popularising the term "Flight of the Earls", since he titled Ó Cianáin's manuscript The Narrative of the Flight of the Earls.

Richard Bagwell, a Unionist politician and historian, stated in 1895 that whilst it is clear Tyrconnell was in contact with Spain, "it must remain uncertain whether there was any [Catholic] conspiracy". He admitted that the Flight's "immediate cause" is unclear, but that its "real causes" related to both Tyrconnell's debt and the incompatibility of Gaelic society with the structure of a modern state. Bagwell argued that, had the earls remained in Ireland, they could not have prevented the erosion of Gaelic culture and of their power. Catholic priest and historian Paul Walsh translated Ó Cianáin's manuscript in 1914 as The Flight of the Earls, influenced by the titled used by Meehan. Walsh wrote that "there is no evidence of conspiracy on the part of [Tyrone] or [Maguire]." He also argued it was unlikely that Tyrconnell feared the discovery of a Catholic plot as early as May 1607, when Baron Howth left the Netherlands with information on the league. For the 1972 Irish-language edition of Walsh's translation, the title was translated as Imeacht na nIarlaí.

=== Late 20th–21st century ===
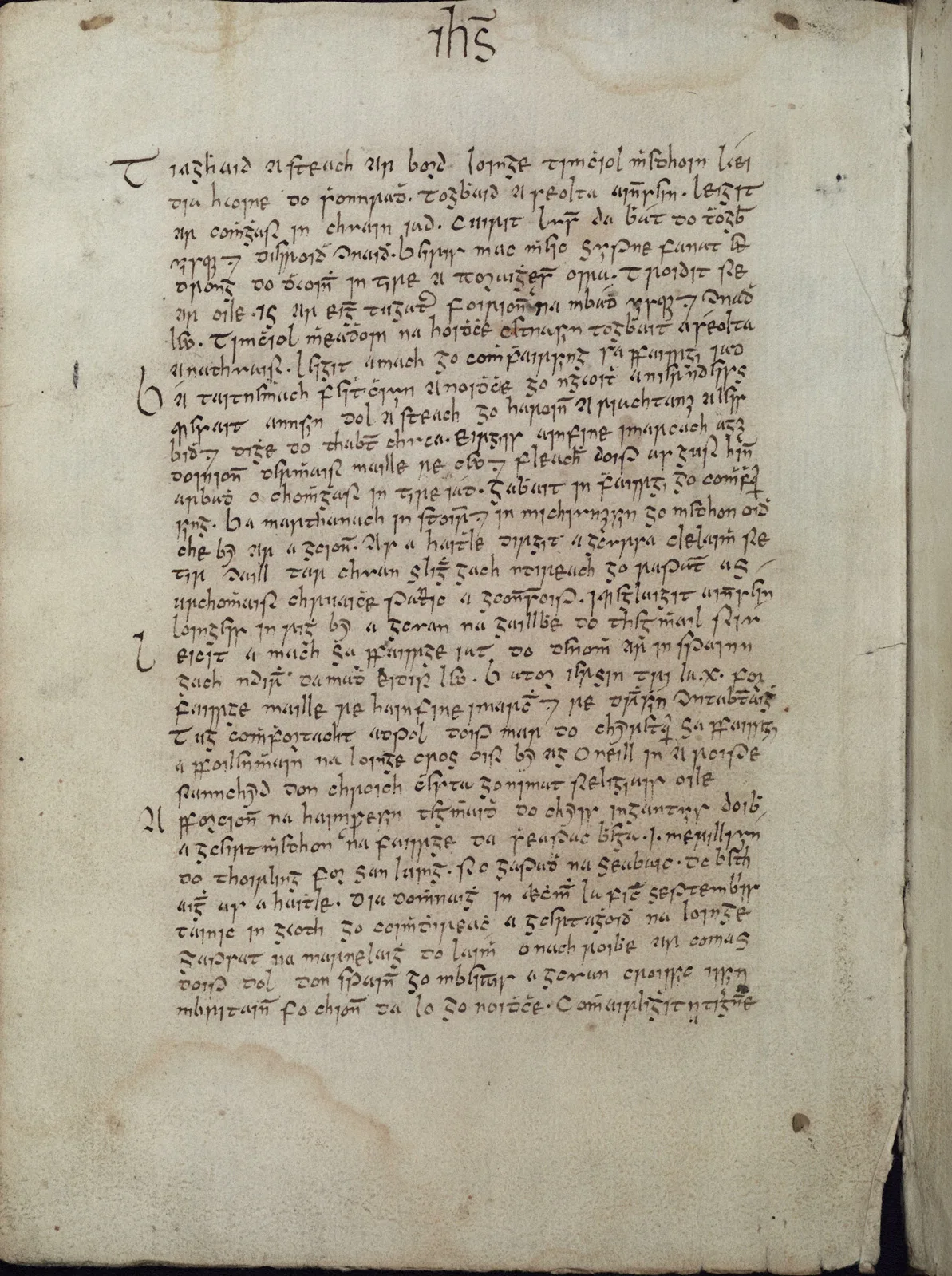
The second page of Tadhg Ó Cianáin's account of the Flight of the Earls

In the 1950s and 1960s, historians such as Micheline Kerney Walsh utilised archives in France and Spain to uncover new information about the earls' emigration. Kerney Walsh was a strong critic of the name "Flight", and John McGurk stated that the term was "pandering to the English interpretation" of the event. Both historians argued that the earls' departure was a tactical retreat and not a spontaneous escape from authorities. Kerney Walsh pointed to correspondence between the earls and the Spanish government to demonstrate that Tyrone planned to ask Philip III for military aid in person, then return to Ireland at the head of an army and retake his lands. However, academic Nicholas Canny noted that, in the earls' letters addressed to James I from the continent, Tyrconnell never stated a desire to return to Ireland.

John McCavitt, who used many of the same continental sources, questioned Kerney Walsh's argument since the Spanish authorities offered "no official encouragement" to the earls. Canny and McCavitt have suggested that the earls' request for Spanish military support may have been simply to spur Philip III into being more generous towards them. Canny also speculated that Tyrconnell and Maguire initially considered emigrating to the Continent to join the Spanish army, as a means of increasing their income and social standing.

McCavitt stated that Tyrone mistakenly believed his arrest was imminent, even though it was "far from inevitable". Based on Hiberno-Spanish correspondence, the earls departed Ireland knowing full well that Philip III wanted to avoid war with England and had previously refused to help the Irish. Ultimately the earls' hopes for Spanish aid were never answered in the way they hoped. Jerrold Casway called the Flight "a miscalculated strategem neither anticipated nor welcomed by Catholic Europe". Hiram Morgan wrote that Tyrone miscalculated his own and Ireland's importance in European politics, and that the Earl became a mere pawn due to his over-reliance on the Spanish government. He stated that Tyrone "[sacrificed] his position by fleeing in the mistaken hope of [Spain's] benevolence".

Canny argued that though Tyrone was able to adapt to the new British order (unlike Tyrconnell and Maguire), he joined the others in their Flight in a panic. Tyrone may have been concerned that, had he remained in Ireland whilst Tyrconnell fled to the Continent, the government would assume that the two earls were in league. Morgan stated that "whatever prompted the flight, it was a snap decision". He noted that Tyrone's flight, leaving Ulster's Gaelic population leaderless and vulnerable to plantation, displays a selfishness that is typical of a Gaelic lord. Canny notes that Tyrone's disregard for Gaelic tradition and his Gaelic countrymen, which was most apparent during the reestablishment of his lordship in 1603-7, explains why "members of the Gaelic learned orders of his own generation" expressed little admiration for him. However many of Tyrone's rivals in Ulster were "not at all displeased" with his departure, and the historian Marianne Elliott noted that the churls "may well have fared a good deal better under the new dispensation than under the Gaelic land system".

Murray Smith stated in 1996 that it is clear the government were overturning Tyrone's generous peace terms, though the allegation of an official plot against Tyrone's life is "still in question". He also stated Tyrone was not innocent of plotting. In 2007, McGurk stated that "historians have been unable to agree on whether or not there was a [Catholic] plot in 1607", though agreed that "the historical jury is still out" on whether there was a government plot against Tyrone's life.

The Flight is typically characterised as enigmatic. Though it is considered a pivotal moment in Irish history, journalist Fintan O'Toole called the "tragic grandeur" of the Flight of the Earls "an accident of history". In contrast to the common perspective, O'Toole stated that the Flight did not mark the death of Gaelic Ireland, but was "a profound cultural disruption". The complex history of the Flight was reshaped by Irish writers into a romantic tale of saintly Catholics dramatically abandoning their homeland during a hopeless struggle against Protestant heresy.

== In culture ==
The poet Eoghan Ruadh Mac an Bhaird, who took part in the Flight, wrote an elegy titled Lament for the Princes of Tyrone and Tyrconnell (Buried in Rome). It famously begins by describing Nuala O'Donnell's grief at her brothers' deaths: "O Woman of the Piercing Wail, Who mournest o'er yon mound of clay..." Richard Weston, another participant in the Flight, wrote a poem whilst in Leuven, wishing that his wife and son were with him. Cuchonnacht Maguire was praised for his role in the Flight in a bardic poem. A bardic poem written immediately after the Flight was titled "A Good Ship's Company". Ethna Carbery's poem Princes of the North is addressed to Tyrone and laments the Flight.

The Flight has been depicted by various visual artists. An illustration of the earls leaving Rathmullan was published in A. M. Sullivan's book Story of Ireland (1867). In the 19th century, H. Warren and J. Rogers produced an engraving of Tyrone coercing Catherine to depart Ireland. One of the best known depictions of the event is Thomas Ryan's 1958 painting The Departure of O'Neill out of Ireland. Murray Smith noted the painting's nationalist message and use of religious symbolism. John Behan's 2007 bronze sculpture Flight of the Earls commemorates the Flight's 400th anniversary. Located in Rathmullan, the sculpture depicts three men walking a gangplank, with a crowd watching from the shore.

The Flight of the Earls Centre in Rathmullan is a permanent exhibition dedicated to the Flight.

=== 400th anniversary commemorations ===
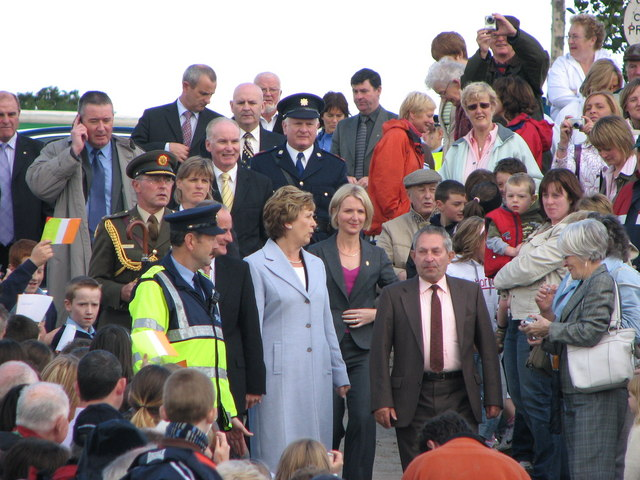
President of Ireland Mary McAleese preparing to unveil a sculpture at Rathmullan on 14 September 2007, the Flight's 400th anniversary.

To commemorate the 400th anniversary of the Flight in 2007, the Donegal County Council and Donegal County Development Board coordinated year-long events throughout the county, spending almost €1.2 million to boost tourism to County Donegal. In January and February 2007, BBC Northern Ireland broadcast a documentary on the Flight, where host Antaine Ó Donnaile retraced the earls' journey. Commemorative postage stamps were issued by the Irish post office, featuring illustrations of Tyrone and Tyrconnell by Seán Ó'Brógáin. In April, an exhibition was opened in Belgium.

On 14 September, President of Ireland Mary McAleese unveiled John Behan's sculpture at Rathmullan. The Cardinal Tomás Ó Fiaich Memorial Library and Archive marked the anniversary with an exhibition and outreach programme supported by the Heritage Lottery Fund. A docudrama film, in which Tyrone was portrayed by Stephen Rea, was screened at the Irish Film Institute on 14 September. The Jeanie Johnston docked at Rathmullan from 12–15 September. 2007 also saw the world premiere of Donal O'Kelly's musical theatre piece Running Beast, with music by Michael Holohan, which is based on Tyrone's career.

Across 2007 and 2008, Denis Conway starred in and organised a production of Brian Friel's 1989 play Making History, which follows Tyrone in Rome reckoning with his legacy. The production was toured along the route of the Flight of the Earls, as well as at various sites in Ireland associated with Tyrone and Hugh Roe O'Donnell. Similarly to the Flight, the tour concluded in Rome.

In April 2008 there were celebrations to mark the 400th anniversary of the earls' arrival in Rome, with a performance by the Cross Border Orchestra of Ireland. Irish clergymen were prominently featured in Pope Benedict XVI's 2008 Corpus Christi procession. Irish cardinal Seán Brady held a commemorative Mass at San Pietro in Montorio.

== Crew and passengers of the Flight ==
Compiling a complete list of individuals who embarked from Rathmullan is difficult as some left or joined the earls' main group throughout the journey from Rathmullan to Rome. Ó Cianáin kept an incomplete record of names, but famously stated there were "ninety-nine" individuals on board. Albert VII forwarded a list of travellers to Philip III on 8 November 1607, and Matthew Tully compiled a list in May 1608 for the Spanish Council of State.

Various efforts have been made to identify the crew and passengers. In 1916, Paul Walsh utilised various sources, including the Annals of the Four Masters and the English State Papers, to expand the list to 39 named participants. In a postscript he added 10 more. In their work Imeacht na nIarlaí (1972), Tomás Ó Fiaich and Pádraig de Barra compiled a list of 113 individuals who were involved (in at least some part) in the Rathmullan–Rome journey. In 2003, Jerrold Casway concluded that "sixty-five to seventy people" travelled from Rathmullan to Quillebeuf. In 2007, John McCavitt stated that at least sixty one individuals are confirmed to have travelled on the ship from Rathmullan to Quillebeuf (they are marked below with a dagger†).

=== Ship's crew ===
Name	Role/Rank	Notes	Ref.
John Rath†	Pilot	His brother, James Rath, did not take part in the Flight.	(Note: John Bath and John Rath have often been mistakenly conflated with each another. John Rath, from Drogheda, was the pilot of the vessel, whereas John Bath was a merchant from Drumcondra. Both men were on the Flight, lived in Spain at the same time and were at one time employed by Tyrone.)

John McGurk stated that "the crew comprised French, Spanish and Flemish hands."

=== O'Neill clan ===
==== Family ====
Name	Role/Rank	Notes	Ref.
Hugh O'Neill, Earl of Tyrone†	O'Neill clan chief, family patriarch	Died July 1616 in Rome, buried in San Pietro in Montorio.	
Catherine O'Neill, Countess of Tyrone†	Tyrone's fourth wife	Died March 1619 in Naples.	
Hugh O'Neill, 4th Baron Dungannon†	Tanist to the O'Neill chieftaincy, Tyrone's eldest surviving son by his late wife Siobhán	Died of illness in Rome in September 1609, buried in San Pietro in Montorio.	
Shane O'Neill†	Tyrone and Catherine's eldest son	Became 3rd Earl of Tyrone in the Spanish nobility and appointed colonel of the first Irish regiment in Spanish service. Died in the Battle of Montjuïc in January 1641.	
Brian O'Neill†	Tyrone and Catherine's youngest son	Found hanged in Brussels in August 1617, aged 13, possibly assassinated. Buried at St Anthony's College.	
Art Oge O'Neill†	Tyrone's nephew	Son of Tyrone's brother Cormac MacBaron and Tyrconnell's sister Margaret	
—N/a	Art Oge O'Neill's wife†		
Brian MacCormac O'Neill†	Tyrone's nephew	Son of Tyrone's brother Cormac MacBaron and Tyrconnell's sister Margaret	
Feardorcha O'Neill†	Tyrone's grandson	Son of Tyrone's eldest son Conn O'Neill, who died in 1601	
Hugh Oge O'Neill†	Tyrone's grand-nephew		
Maigbheathadh Ó Néill†			
Hugh MacHenry O'Neill			

There is a report of Tyrone's daughter—"very beautiful... marriageable and greatly admired"—with him in Rome in 1615. It is not clear whether she participated in the Flight or travelled to the Continent at a different time. Aodh mac Aingil wrote a poem ascribed to the late Baron Dungannon, which is addressed to a Brigid O'Neill. Paul Walsh stated it was "extremely probable" that Brigid was the same "greatly admired" daughter. Micheline Kerney Walsh agreed with this, and presumes Brigid was on the Flight. John McCavitt notes that, as the fate of Tyrone's daughter Rose is unknown, it is possible Rose was the "greatly admired" daughter.

==== Staff ====
Name	Role/Rank	Notes	Ref.
Henry Hovenden†	Tyrone's secretary and chief advisor	Tyrone's Anglo-Irish foster-brother. Died in September 1610 in Rome, buried in San Pietro in Montorio.	
Henry O'Hagan†	Tyrone's secretary	Survived Tyrone and settled disputes of his will.	
Pedro Blanco†	Footman	Spanish seaman who came to Ireland in the Spanish Armada. Blanco was living in Rome in 1616.	
Muircheartach O'Quinn†	Marshall		
Christopher Plunkett†	Master of horse		
—N/a	Tyrone's page		
Seán na bpunta Ó hÁgáin†	Rent collector		
—N/a	Wife of Seán na bpunta Ó hÁgáin†		

=== O'Donnell clan ===
==== Family ====
Name	Role/Rank	Notes	Ref.
Rory O'Donnell, 1st Earl of Tyrconnell†	O'Donnell clan chief, family patriarch	Made 1st Earl of Tyrconnell in 1603. Died in Rome from fever in July 1608, buried in San Pietro in Montorio.	
Hugh O'Donnell, Baron of Donegal†	Tanist to the O'Donnell chieftaincy, Tyrconnell's only son by his wife Bridget.	Succeeded his father as 2nd Earl of Tyrconnell. He entered the Spanish army and was killed in July 1642 in a naval engagement off Catalonia.	
Caffar O'Donnell†	Tyrconnell's only surviving brother	His older brothers, Hugh Roe and Manus, died in the Nine Years' War. Caffar died in Rome from fever in September 1608, and was buried in San Pietro in Montorio.	
Rosa O'Doherty†	Caffar's wife	Sister of Cahir O'Doherty. She later remarried to Owen Roe O'Neill and returned to Ireland in the 1640s. Rosa died in Brussels in November 1660 and was buried at St Anthony's College.	
Hugh O'Donnell†	Caffar and Rosa's son	Died in 1625 as a captain in the Siege of Breda	
Nuala O'Donnell†	Tyrconnell's sister	Died circa 1630, and buried at St Anthony's College (Note: The historian Robert Dunlop stated that Nuala brought her daughter Grania with her on the Flight. Grania is not mentioned in Tadhg Ó Cianáin's account, and historian Jerrold Casway stated that Nuala had no children at the time of the Flight.)	
Donal Oge O'Donnell†	Tyrconnell's half-nephew	Son of Rory's late half-brother Donal	
Nechtain O'Donnell†	Tyrconnell's second cousin		

==== Staff ====
Name	Role/Rank	Notes	Ref.
Seán Crón MacDaibhid	Steward	He may have successfully returned to Ireland	
Mathew Tully†	Secretary	Formerly secretary to Tyrconnell's late brother Hugh Roe O'Donnell	
Caecilia O'Gallagher†	Baron of Donegal's wet nurse		
Hugh O'Gallagher†	Caecilia's husband		
Muiris	Tyrconnell's page	Died in August 1608	

=== Other nobles ===
Name	Role/Rank	Notes	Ref.
Cuchonnacht Maguire†	Maguire clan chief, Lord of Fermanagh	Maguire organised the ship. He died of fever in Genoa in August 1608.	
Sémus Mac Éimhir MacConnell	Maguire's son		
—N/a	Maguire's son	Name of the second son is unknown	
Donagh O'Brien†		A cousin of the earls of Thomond and Clanrickard who helped Maguire get to Rathmullan	
Donagh MacSweeney	Son of the lord of Tír Boghaine		

=== Clergymen ===
Name	Notes	Ref.
Fr. Colmán	Tyrone's priest	
Fr. Muiris Ultach	This individual could be Muiris MacDonough Ultach or Muiris MacSean Ultach.	
Fr. Patrick Duff	The Earl of Tyrone's private chaplain	
Fr. Pádraig Ó Lorcáin	The Countess of Tyrone's chaplain	
Fr. Tomás Strong†	Clergyman from Waterford. He had returned to Ireland in 1608.	
Fr. Roibeard Mac Artúir (or Chamberlain)		
Fr. Pádraig Ó Luchráin	Later executed in Dublin on charges related to the Flight	
Fr. Niallán Mac Thiarnáin		
Fr. Toirealach Ó Sléibhín		
Fr. Brian Ó Gormlaigh		
Fr. Diarmaid Ó Duláin		

=== Writers ===
Name	Notes	Ref.
Tadhg Ó Cianáin†	Authored a diary of the Flight whilst living in Rome. His account abruptly ends in November 1608, so it is possible he died around that time.	
Eoghan Ruadh Mac an Bhaird	A bardic poet who accompanied Nuala O'Donnell, his patroness	

=== Merchants ===
Name	Notes	Ref.
Richard Weston†	Dundalk merchant who was manager of Tyrone's bribes. By 1599 he had become a double agent working for the English government.	
John Bath†	Drumcondra merchant. He was a brother of James Bath, the Jesuit who killed Donal O'Sullivan Beare in 1618.	

=== Soldiers ===
- John Connor, captain†

=== Students ===
- Patrick MacHenry O'Hagan
- Patrick MacCormac O'Hagan
- Éamann Ó Maolchraoibhe
- Fearghas mac Cathmhaoil
- Matha Mac Thréanfhir
- Walter Rath

=== Other émigrés ===
- Eamonn gruamdha MacDaibhid
- Eamonn gruamdha MacDaibhid's wife
- Aodh Mac Domhnaill Ó Gallchobhair†
- Turlough Carragh O'Gallagher†
- Cahir MacToimlin O'Gallagher†
- Edmund Breatnach (also known as Brannagh or Walsh)†
- Henry O'Kelly†
- George Cashel†
- Donnachadh Mac Suibhne, son of Mac Suibhne Baghaineach
- Gearóid Ó Conchubhair, son of Gearóid Ó Conchubhair
- Cyer Mac Tamalin
- David Craffort
- George Ichingham
- Donncha Ó hÁgáin
- Pádraig Ó Coinne
- George Moore
- Peter Preston
- Patrick Rath
- Pádraig Mag Uidhir
- Edmund de Burgo
- Cathaoir Mac Airt Ó Gallchóir
- Tuathal O'Gallagher
- Hugh Óg MacTuathal O'Gallagher
- Seán Mac Philib
- Aonghus Mac Dhuifíthe
- Uilliam Ó Loingsigh
- Cathal Ó Broin
- Bernard Morris
- Niallan Mac Davitt
- Conchbhar Óg Ó Duibheannaigh
- Donnchadh Coughlan
- Dermot Dolan
- Brian O'Hegarty
- Doighre Ó Duígeannáin
- Hugh McVeigh†
- Stephen Rath, John Rath's son†
- Seamus MacMahon†
- Gerard O'Connor†
- Edmund Óg O'Donnelly†
- Una Shiels†
- "Young" St Leger†
- Rose Gallagher
- A "Frenchman"
- A boy named Ó Coinne

=== Additional staff ===
In his account, Ó Cianáin recorded "2 lackies of [Tyrone]", "4 servants of [Tyrconnell]", "3 lackies of [Tyrconnell]" and "3 waiting women".

=== Individuals who joined the émigrés in mainland Europe ===
Florence Conroy did not board at Rathmullan; he met the earls at Douai and escorted them to Leuven, then continued on with them to Rome. Eugene Matthews travelled with the earls' party from Douai to Arras. Tyrone's son Henry met the earls at Halle and travelled with them until Leuven.

=== Notable individuals left behind in Ireland ===
- Bridget FitzGerald, Tyrconnell's wife
- Iníon Dubh, Tyrconnell's mother
- Mary O'Donnell, Tyrconnell's sister
- Niall Garbh O'Donnell, Tyrconnell's cousin and brother-in-law
- Hugh Boye O'Donnell, Niall Garve's brother
- Hugh McHugh Dubh O'Donnell, senior O'Donnell nobleman
- Cormac MacBaron O'Neill, Tyrone's brother
- Margaret O'Donnell, Tyrconnell's sister and Cormac's wife
- Conn Ruadh O'Neill, Tyrone's son
- Caffar Oge "Con" O'Donnell, illegitimate son of Caffar O'Donnell

== See also ==
- Tudor conquest of Ireland
- Contention of the bards
- O'Cahan
- Tadhg Ó Cianáin
- "The Hunting of the Earl of Rone"
- Regiment of Hibernia
