= Stanyhurst =

Stanyhurst or Stanihurst is a surname. Notable people with the surname include:

- James Stanihurst (c. 1522–1571), Irish politician
- Richard Stanihurst (1547–1618), Irish alchemist, translator, poet and historian, son of James
- William Stanyhurst (1602–1663), Belgian Jesuit, son of Richard
