= Irish College, Antwerp =

Irish seminary

Irish College Antwerp
- Dutch: Iers College te Antwerpen
- Other names: College of the Irish Priests in Antwerp
- Type: Seminary
- Active: 1600c–1795
- Parent institution: Irish College, Douai
- Religious affiliation: Roman Catholic
- Academic affiliations: Jesuit College Antwerp

Irish College, Antwerp, was an Irish Pastoral College, dedicated to St. Patrick for Irish Secular Priests, which opened circa 1600 during the Penal Laws in Antwerp, in what is now Belgium. It was a satellite college of the Irish College, Douai. The College was redeveloped in 1629 by Lawrence Sedgrave a Leinster priest (from a wealthy Catholic family which included a former Lord Mayor of Dublin Walter Sedgrave) who bought the premises. Students attended lectures at the Jesuit college at Antwerp, where Irish Jesuit Fr. Richard Archdeacon (Arsdekin), S.J. taught, and later from 1716 students studied at the Antwerp Diocesan Seminary in Schoenmarkt. Where previously the College was in total control of its Presidents Sedgrave, Talbot, and Eustace, from 1677 the College became more under the control of the diocese under the brief tenure of Bishop of Antwerp Aubertus van den Eede, this was in line with the Council of Trent decrees. It was following James Clears appointment as president, and the episcopacy of Joannes Ferdinandus Van Beughem as Bishop of Antwerp, in 1679, that the first formal set of rules and regulations were agreed and printed.

The college closed, as did the other Irish colleges, following the French Revolution and the occupation of Belgium in 1795. The Franciscan Bishop Leighlin Francisco de Ribera resided in the Irish College Antwerp, when he could not stay in Ireland. The Belgian Jesuit and religious writer (of Irish extraction) William Stanyhurst SJ, taught at the Irish college in Antwerp.

== Rectors/Presidents ==
Following his dead Fr. Sedgraves' nephew Rev. James Talbot succeeded him as Rector/President in 1633, Talbot was followed by Nicholas Eustace (1642–1677), other Rectors/Presidents include James Cleer (1677–), John Egan, Martin Caddan, Peter Hennessy, Michael Hennessy (1704–1730), John Kent (1731–1732), Daniel O'Reilly (1732–1747), Hugh MacMahon(1747–1772 & 1774–1787), James MacMahon (1772–1774), and Hugh O'Reilly (1787–1795). Bishop Peter Talbot (1620–1680), archbishop of Dublin (1671–1680), served as chair of theology in Antwerp.
