= Irish College, Douai =

Seminary at Douai, France

Coordinates: 50.38°N 3.08°E

Irish College Douai
- Coláiste na nGael, Douai
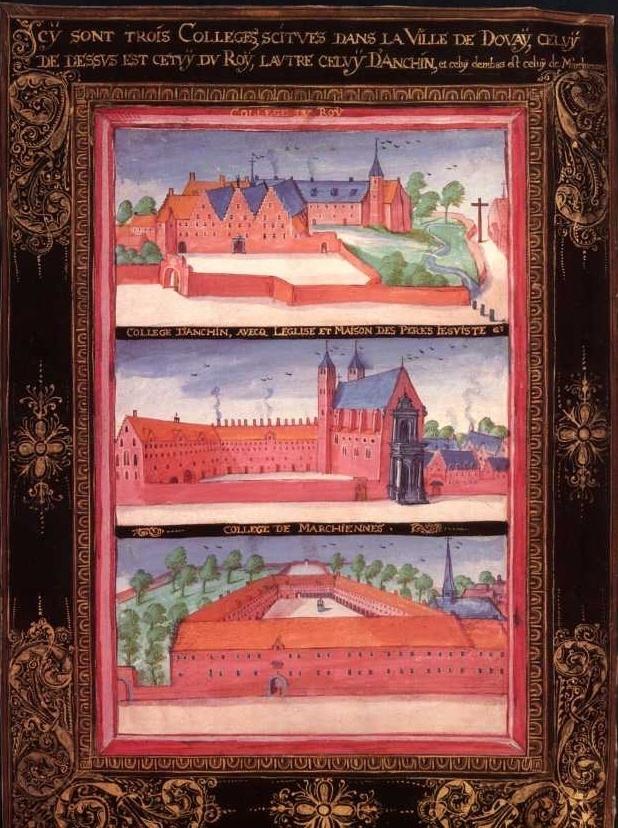
- Colleges at University of Douai
- Other names: St. Patrick's College, Douai
- Type: Seminary
- Active: 1603–1793
- Founders: Christopher Cusack
- Religious affiliation: Roman Catholic
- Academic affiliations: University of Douai (1610–1793)

The Irish College was a seminary at Douai, France, for Irish Roman Catholics in exile on the continent of Europe to study for the priesthood, modelled on the English College there. Dedicated to St. Patrick, the college was sometimes referred to as St. Patrick's College, Douai.

== History ==
It was founded in 1603 by Fr. Christopher Cusack (a member of a prominent landowning family from County Meath), with the support of Philip III of Spain, as a Spanish foundation and endowed with 5,000 florins a year by the King of Spain. Prior to the establishment of the Irish College, Douai, from 1593, 25 places were allocated to Irish students in the Scots College, Douai, then in Pont a Mousson. Fr. Cusack had some years earlier since 1595, tried to set up a hostel to support Irish candidates for the priesthood in Douai.

The course of studies lasted six years and the students attended lectures at the university of Douai, where its Faculty of Theology took the Irish Seminary of Douai under its wing in 1610. At the time of its foundation and during the colleges early years Douai was part of the Spanish Netherlands. The Irish College, Antwerp was set up as a satellite college of the Irish College, Douai.

In 1667 Louis XIV of France, took control of Douai and the college became subject to French authority.

The college benefited from the expertise of English scholars in Douai, priests were trained to preach in the Irish language.

The college was rebuilt about the middle of the 18th century. The college closed in 1793 and in 1795 the buildings, valued at 60,000 francs, were alienated by the French Government during the war against the Kingdom of Great Britain in 1793 to 1802, and provided back to Irish priests in 1802, this legacy was incorporated into the Irish College in Paris (and the Fondation Irlandaise).

=== Irish Students in Douai priort to establishment of the Irish College ===
Prior to the establishment of the Irish College, there were Irish students who trained at Douai, in 1577 Pope Gregory XIII requested the University of Douai supported Irish students, as did the Jesuits of Douai, also Irish students were accommodated at both the Scots College, Douai, and the English College, Douai. From 1583 when Scots College had moved to Pont-à-Mousson, it was mandated as part of its papal grant to accommodate Irish Students, following the move in to Douai, no such obligation was in place and Irish Students were excluded. Cardinal William Allen's, English College, hosted Irish students both during its exile in Rheims and when it returned to Douai.

== People associated with the Irish College, Douai ==
Blessed Patrick O'Loughran attended the Irish College before returning to Ireland in 1611. Fr. Cusack served as head of the college, until his death in 1619, he was succeeded by his cousin, Laurence Sedgrave who had been vice-president, and served until 1633. Luke Bellew from Galway, studied at the college, and became its president. Bishop Edward Dillon served as Superior of the College prior to returning to Ireland and becoming a Bishop. Patrick O’Nachten who turned down the bishopric of Killala, also served as President of the college. Fr Luke McKiernan served as president/rector of the Irish College in Douai (1752-84).

=== Alumni ===
- Bishop Nicholas Joseph Archdeacon, Bishop of Kilmacduagh and Kilfenora
- Fr. Luke Bellew, served as President of the College
- Valentine Browne, OFM
- Bishop Edward Dillon, Archbishop of Tuam, and earlier Bishop of Kilmacduagh and Kilfenora
- Dr. Patrick Fleming OFM, Professor of Theology, Leuven, and first rector of the Franciscan Irish College, Prague: he was Christopher Cusack's nephew.
- Bishop Heber MacMahon, Bishop of Clogher
- Fr. Thomas Messingham, third rector of the Irish College in Paris
- Bishop Daniel O'Reilly, Bishop of Clogher, also served as President of the Irish College, Antwerp (1732-1747).
- Bishop Edmund O'Reilly, Archbishop of Armagh, began his studies in Douai
- Bishop David Rothe, Bishop of Ossory, completed his studies in Salamanca
- Bishop Patrick Plunkett O.Cist, Bishop of Ardagh and Bishop of Meath (tutored his cousin's son St. Oliver Plunkett)

== See also ==
- University of Douai
- English College, Douai
- Scottish College, Douai
- Irish College
- List of Jesuit sites
