= Thomas Ryan (artist) =

20th-century Irish painter and academic (1929–2021)

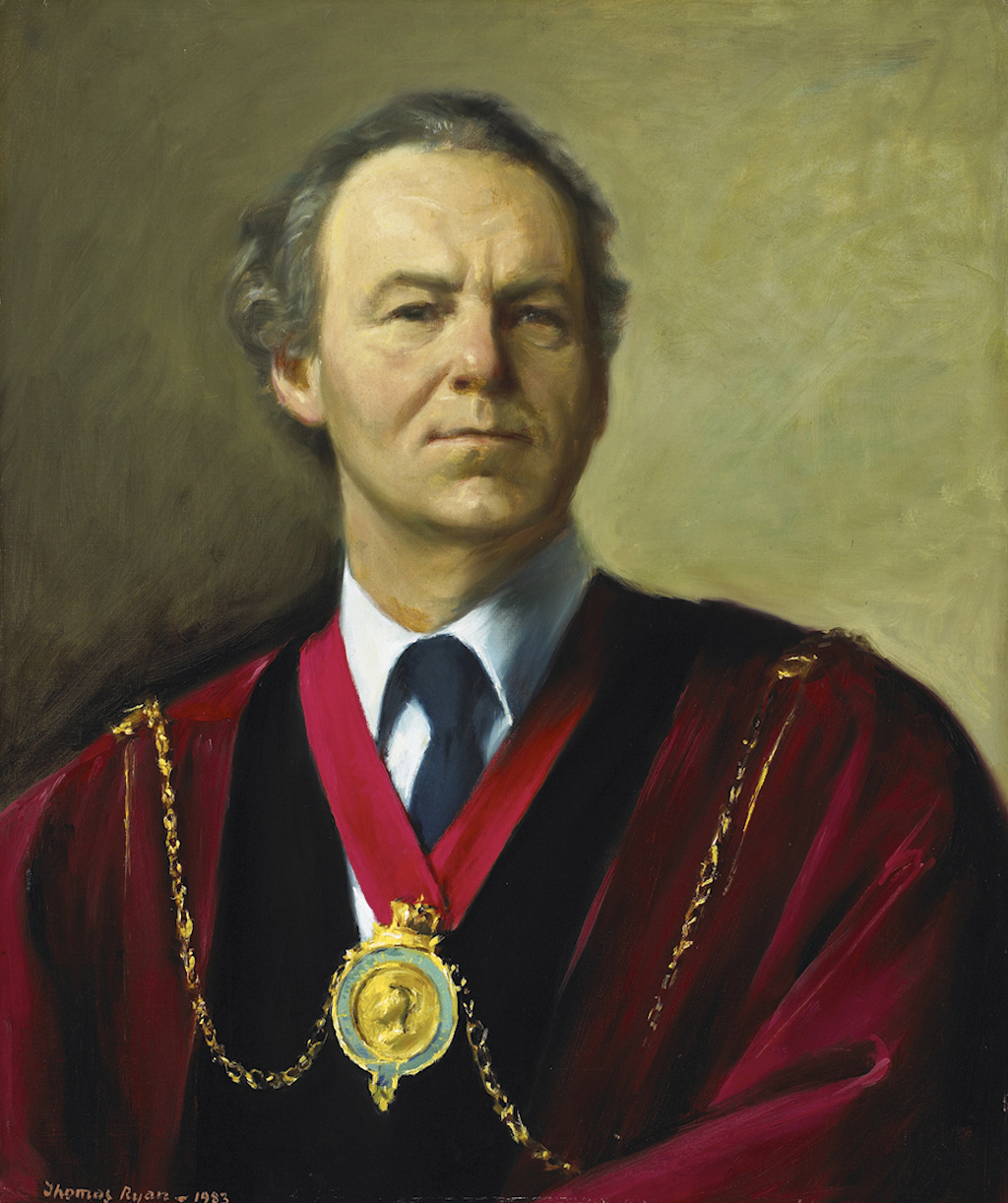
- Self Portrait. In robes as President of the Royal Hibernian Academy
- Born: 16 September 1929; Limerick, Ireland
- Died: 15 September 2021 (aged 91); Blanchardstown, Dublin, Ireland
- Resting place: Donaghmore Cemetery, Ashbourne, County Meath, Ireland
- Education: Limerick College of Art; National College of Art
- Known for: Painting, drawing, medalling, portrait
- Notable work: Flight of the Earls, GPO 1916
- Awards: Freedom of Limerick (2007)
- Elected: Royal Hibernian Academy PPRHA, Honorary member of RA & SRA

Thomas Ryan (16 September 1929 – 15 September 2021) was an Irish artist, designer and medallist.

== Biography ==
Born in St Joseph's Street, Limerick in 1929, Thomas Ryan grew up in Davis Street in the city. He was educated at the Limerick College of Art and the National College of Art in Dublin where he studied under well-known artists such as Seán Keating and Maurice MacGonigal. Ryan worked in a variety of media, including oil paints, watercolours, charcoal, pencil and red and brown chalks. Some of his portraiture subjects include Ronnie Delaney, Patrick Hillery, Seán Keating and Éamon de Valera. His works Flight of the Earls and GPO 1916 are regarded as two of the country's most important historical works. Ryan's medallic work included designing the old Irish one pound coin and the Millennium fifty pence piece. During his ten-year presidency of the Royal Hibernian Academy, he undertook the task of successfully completing the unfinished RHA Gallagher Gallery in Dublin.

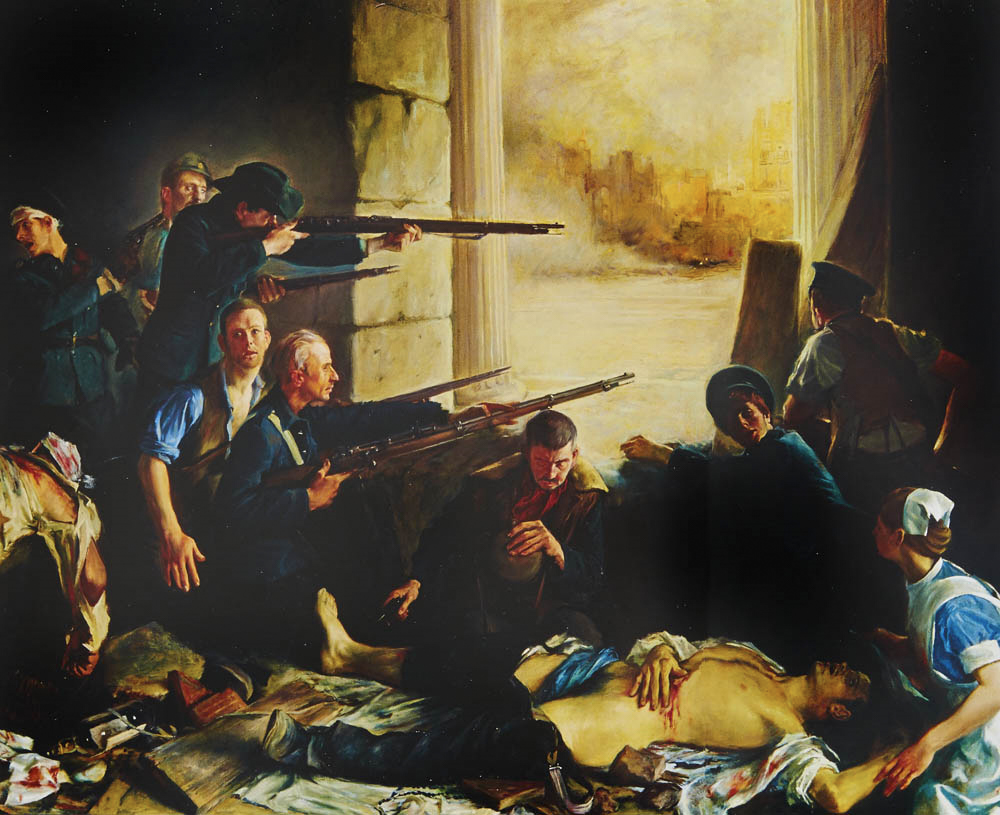
GPO 1916 by Thomas Ryan

== Personal life and death ==
Ryan lived in Ashbourne, County Meath for about 45 years. He died in Blanchardstown, County Dublin on 15 September 2021, a day before his 92nd birthday.
