= Richard Stanyhurst =

Anglo-Irish writer, alchemist and later priest

Richard Stanyhurst (or Stanihurst) (1547–1618) was an Anglo-Irish alchemist, translator, poet and historian, who was born in Dublin.

== Life ==
His father, James Stanyhurst, was Recorder of Dublin, and Speaker of the Irish House of Commons in 1557, 1560 and 1568. His grandfather was Nicholas Stanihurst, Mayor of Dublin from 1542 to 1543. His mother was Anne Fitzsimon, daughter of Thomas Fitzsimon, who served as Recorder of Dublin. Richard was sent to Peter White's Kilkenny College after which, in 1563, he continued to University College, Oxford, where he took his degree five years later. At Oxford, he became intimate with Edmund Campion. After leaving the university he studied law at Furnival's Inn and Lincoln's Inn. He contributed in 1587 to Holinshed's Chronicles "a playne and perfecte description" of Ireland, and a History of Ireland during the reign of Henry VIII, which were severely criticized in Barnabe Rich's New Description of Ireland (1610) as a misrepresentation of Irish affairs written from the English standpoint. They also caused offence to Catholics for their anti-Catholic perspective. After the death of his wife, Janet Barnewall, daughter of Sir Christopher Barnewall (whom he praised warmly in his contribution to Holinshed), in 1579, Stanyhurst went to the Netherlands. After his second marriage, which took place before 1585, to Helen Copley, he became active in the Catholic cause. He lived in the bishopric of Liège, where he got in touch with the Paracelsan movement gathered around Ernest of Bavaria (1554–1612). From then, Stanyhurst analysed the relationships between medicine and chemistry.

In the early 1590s, he was invited to Spain by King Philip II, who became seriously ill. Stanyhurst worked at the great alchemical laboratory in El Escorial. At the same time, he informed the state of Catholics' interest in England. An unknown work by him, entitled Uso y Experiençia de las Mediçinas que hasta agora ha hecho Ricardo Stanihurst (dated 1593), has recently been discovered, edited and studied. The title translates as ‘Method of Use and Effects of the Medicines that Richard Stanihurst has so far prepared at the Court of Madrid’. It is a handbook containing instructions for Philip II’s court physicians, explaining the correct dosage for each chymical remedy, its therapeutic applications and clinical guidelines. Stanihurst taught the technicians at the large distillation laboratory at El Escorial how to prepare the most perishable medicines. Other special, longer-lasting medicines were produced by Stanihurst in large quantities and kept in the royal jewellery chamber, to be used when required. This is a highly significant work, as it is the first Renaissance vademecum created and designed for a court environment as prominent as that of Philip II, containing extensive first-hand information on the numerous chemical remedies distributed from the large ‘distillery’ established at El Escorial in 1587. Its medicines are reminiscent of some of those produced in the ‘officina di distillazione di medicinali’ at the Fonderia Medicea, which had been in operation since 1555 and was expanded at the Casino di San Marco from 1576 onwards.

After his wife's death in 1602 he took holy orders, and became chaplain to the Archduke Albert of Austria in the Netherlands. He had two sons, Peter and William Stanyhurst, both of whom became Jesuits.

He never returned to England, and died at Brussels, according to Anthony à Wood.

== Works ==
Stanyhurst translated into English The First Foure Bookes of Virgil his Aeneis (Leiden, 1582), to give practical proof of the feasibility of Gabriel Harvey's theory that classical rules of prosody could be successfully applied to English poetry. The translation is considered by the 1911 Encyclopedia Britannica an unconscious burlesque of the original in a jargon arranged in what the writer called hexameters. Thomas Nashe in his preface to Greene's Menaphon ridiculed this performance as his

heroicall poetrie, infired ... with an hexameter furie

a patterne whereof I will propounde to your judgements. Then did he make heaven's vault to rebounde, with rounce robble hobble Of ruffe raffe roaring, with thwick thwack thurlery bouncing.

This is a parody, but not a very extravagant one, of Stanyhurst's vocabulary and metrical methods.

Only two copies of the original Leiden edition of Stanyhurst's translation of Virgil are known to be in existence. In this edition, his orthographical cranks are preserved. A reprint in 1583 by Henry Bynneman forms the basis of James Maidment's edition (Edinburgh, 1836), and of Edward Arber's reprint (1880), which contains an excellent introduction. Stanyhurst's Latin works include De rebus in Hibernia gestis (Antwerp, 1584) and a life of St Patrick (1587).

A new edition of Stanyhurst's controversial Latin history of Ireland was created in 2013 by Hiram Morgan and John Barry for Cork University Press under the title, Great Deeds in Ireland: Richard Stanyhurst's De Rebus in Hibernia Gestis. This work is a product of the Centre for Neo-Latin Studies at University College Cork.
