= William Stanyhurst =

Irish-Belgian Jesuit (1601 – 1663)

William Stanyhurst (1601 – 1663) was a Belgian Jesuit of Irish parentage. He was a prolific author of Latin religious works, one of which, Dei immortalis in corpore mortali patientis historia, was widely popular, and was translated into many languages.

== Life ==
William was the younger son of the Dublin-born poet and historian Richard Stanyhurst and his second wife Helen Copley, who died during his infancy, and was born at Brussels on 15 June 1601. After studying at the Jesuit college in Brussels, he entered the Society of Jesus at Mechelen on 25 September 1617. His older brother Peter had joined the Jesuits a year before him, and died while serving as a chaplain to the Flemish fleet on 22 April 1627.

After making his profession, William taught Latin composition and rhetoric at the Jesuit college in Kortrijk. He was ordained priest on 30 March 1630. He went on to head a sodality for students and masters of the faculties of Law and Medicine at the University of Leuven, of which Ferdinand III and Wladislaw IV became honorary members. During this period Stanyhurst gained a reputation as an eloquent preacher in English, Dutch and Latin, and as a discerning confessor.

In 1654 he was transferred to Antwerp, where he taught at the Irish College, Antwerp while residing in the Professed House, and headed the city's Latin Sodality. During an epidemic in the city in 1657, he insisted on ministering to the afflicted, and contracted the disease himself. He was expected to die, and received the last rites, but made a recovery. In the autumn of 1662, he was sent to Brussels to recuperate his health in his native air but he died there on 10 January 1663.

== Works ==
Stayhurst was a voluminous writer of religious works, many of which enjoyed a European vogue. His Dei Immortalis in corpore mortali patientis Historia, which appeared at Antwerp in 1660, was repeatedly reprinted, both in the original Latin and in French, Spanish, Flemish, Dutch, German, Polish, and Hungarian translations. His Veteris Hominis . . . quatuor novissima metamorphosis et novi genesis, dedicated to James van Baerlant, Antwerp, 1661 (Prague, 1700; Vienna, 1766), was translated into Czech, French, German, Italian, and Spanish. Others of his works, all of which passed through many editions, are:

- Album Marianum, describing God's beneficence to Austria (Louvain, 1641)
- Regio mortis sive Domus infelicis aeternitatis (Antwerp, 1652)
- Quotidiana Christiani Militis tessera (Antwerp, 1661) - parts of this reappeared in Selectissima moralis Christianae praecepta harmonicis metris ac rythmis expressa (Antwerp, 1662)
- Ecclesia Militans, Antwerp.
