= List of national monuments in County Carlow =

The Irish state has officially approved the following list of national monuments in County Carlow. In the Republic of Ireland, a structure or site may be deemed to be a "national monument", and therefore worthy of state protection, if it is of national importance. If the land adjoining the monument is essential to protect it, this land may also be protected.

== National Monuments ==
NM#	Monument name	Description	Image	Townland	Location
347	Aghade Holed Stone (Cloghaphoill)	Holed Stone		Aghade	52°46′12″N 6°44′48″W
351	Ballyloughan Castle	Castle		Ballyloughan	52°40′23″N 6°53′53″W
486	Ballymoon Castle	Castle		Ballymoon	52°42′00″N 6°54′25″W
566	Baunogenasraid	Burial Mound (Cist)		Baunogenasraid	52°48′45″N 6°49′25″W
306	Carlow Castle	Castle		Carlow	52°50′11″N 6°56′09″W
545	Castlemore Moat	Motte and Bailey & Cross Slab		Castlemore	52°48′34″N 6°46′21″W
613	Browneshill	Portal Tomb		Kernanstown	52°50′14″N 6°52′52″W
393	Killoughternane Church	Church		Killoughternane	52°38′02″N 6°51′13″W
603	Rathvilly Moat	Burial Mound or Motte		Knockroe	52°52′50″N 6°40′42″W
438	Leighlinbridge Castle	Castle		Leighlinbridge	52°44′09″N 6°58′41″W
350	Lorum High Cross	Cross Fragment		Lorum	52°39′51″N 6°55′56″W
352	Nurney Cross	Cross		Nurney	52°45′06″N 6°54′44″W
3	St. Mullin's	Early Medieval Ecclesiastical Site		St Mullin's	52°29′20″N 6°55′42″W
452	Straboe Grave Slab	Medieval Grave Slab		Straboe	52°51′41″N 6°46′19″W

== See also ==
- List of country houses in County Carlow
