= Lithghean =

Lithghean was an Irish saint, of Cluain-mór-Lithghein, in Uí Failghe in Leinster. His mother is said to be Broinnfhinn Brecc, daughter of Lughna, and sister of St. Iubhar, though according to another account, his mother was Mella, the sister of St. Ibar. He was of the Dál Cormaic, and brother of St. Abbán and St. Senach of Cill-mór. Lithghean was likely one of the seven presbyters buried at Killeen Cormac. His feast-day is 16 January.
