= Dál Cormaic =

Dál Cormaic (also Clann Cormaic, Uí Cormaic Lagen, Moccu Corbmaic) were a Gaelic dynasty located in South Kildare.

== People ==
=== Abbán moccu Corbmaic ===
St. Abbán had six brothers: Daman Uí Chormaic of Tígh Damhain (Tidowan), in the barony of Marybouragh, Co. Laois; Miacca Uí Cormaic of Cluain Fodhla in Fiodhmar (borders Uí Duach/Bally Fíodhmor, Ossory); Senach Uí Chormaic of Cillmór; Lithghean Uí Chormaic of Cluain Mór Lethghian in Uí Failge (Barony Ophaly, Co. Kildare); Dubhan Uí Chormaic; Toimdeach Uí Chormaic of Rosglas, Monasterevin, Co. Kildare.

=== Artacan mac Taidcg ===
Artacan macTaidcg, mac Sinill, mac Anchoraig, mac Siadalta, mac Maeluidir, mac h-Iuin, mac Colmain, mac Cuirc, mac Fergusa, mac Cormaic, mac Con-Chorb.

=== Cenannáin mac Ceise ===
Cenannáin was the father of St. Sinchell (the younger) and Mincloth, mother of Coluim mac Crimthaind. The Cloonmorris Ogham stone in Leitrim is said to be the burial place of Cenannáin. His ancestry is given as Cenannáin mac Ceise, mac Lugdach, mac Labrada, mac Imchadha, mac Cormaic, mac Con-Chorbb.

=== Coirpre mac Cathasaig ===
Coirpre mac Cathasaig, mac Muirgiusa, mac Fergusa, mac Snédgusa, mac Máelhuidir, mac Colmáin Eltíne, mac Blaithmeic, mac Áeda Indén (a quo Fuithirbi), mac Cathbath, mac Labrada, mac Threna, mac Imchadha, mac Corbmaic, mac Con Corb.

=== Con-Chorb mac Moga Chorbb. ===
Con-Chorb (also Cú Corb) was king of Leinster and father to Nia Corb, Cormac Luisc, Messin Corb, and Cairbre. He fought seven battles against Fedlimid Rechtmar the father of Conn of the Hundred Battles, three battles at Ath Find Fáíl, Battle of Ath an Scail, Battle of Fossud, Battle of Bernas, Battle of Glas Glé. He also a number of battles against the Munstermen, the Battle of Mullach Maistean, the Battle of Ath Troistean (Ath Í), the Battle of Coirtheine in Magh (Laoighis) Riada, Battle of Slighe Dhala and Battle of Bealach Mór Osruighe. Con-Chorb was killed by Fedlimid Rechtmar and is buried on Mount Leinster (Sleibh Laighean).

=== Cormaic Luisc mac Con-Chorb ===
Cormaic Luisc (also Cormaic Losc, Cormac Caoch). Cormaic Luisc had two sons Imchada and Fergusa.

=== Cumma ingen Lochéni ===
Cumma (also Mo Chumma) was the daughter of Lochéni mac Dímmae of Chill Canaig (h-Uí Chainnig). Dímmae was either a descendant of Cainnech or Cairthínd, both sons of Labrada mac Imchada, mac Cormaic, mac Con-Chorb. Cumma was the mother of Mo Chua mac Lonain and also St. Diarmaid (Mo Dímmoc) the founder Gleann Uissen. Several other descendants of the Dál Cormaic are also associated with the sanctuary of Gleann Uissen (Killeshin), such as Flann Filí mac Maelmeadhog (Mail-Máedoc), mac Diarmata, was Airchinneach of Gleann Uisean (death 977 AD).Dímmae was the ancestor of the h-Úi Dimmae of Uí Labrada.

=== Cruaich mac Duilge ===
Cruaich genealogy is given as: Cruaich mac Duilge, mac Imchada, mac Brolaich, mac Lugdach, mac Imchada, mac Cormaic, mac Con-Chorb. The parish of Narraghmore (An Forrach Mhór) in the territory of Dál Cormaic was anciently known as Bile Macc Cruaigh (the Sacred Tree of the Sons of Cruach). Cruaich had two notable sons recorded in history Macha and h-Eircc.

=== Dubh da Chrích mac Irgusa ===
Dubh da Chrích mac Írgusa, mac Echdach, mac Eogain, mac Mael Anfaid, mac Sharain, mac Feradaig, mac Senaig, mac Blait, mac Nannida, mac Oengusa Oenochrae, mac Lugdach, mac Labrada, mac Imchada, mac Cormaic, mac Con Corb.

=== Dubthach maccu Lugair ===
Dubthach maccu Lugair (fifth century), Chief Ollamh of Ireland, was a legendary Irish poet and lawyer who lived at the time of St Patrick's mission in Ireland and in the reign of Lóegaire mac Néill, high-king of Ireland. He oversaw the compilation of the Seanchas Mór (Early Irish Law) along with St. Patrick and Lóegaire mac Néill.

Dubthach was the father of seven saints, St. Gabhran, St. Fachtna of Kiltoom, St. Mo Laisse, St. Trian, St. Euhel, St. Moninne and St. Lonan.

=== Echthigern mac Dondgusa ===
Echthigern mac Dondgusa, mac Cossaig, mac Uargusa, mac Maelgairb, mac Buide, mac Laidgnen, mac Cummini, mac Colmain Altini, mac Cummini, mac Blaithmeic, mac Aeda, mac Cathbud (Cathuib), mac Labrada, mac Imchada, mac Cormaic, m Con Corb.

=== Fergusa mac Cormaic ===
Fergusa mac Cormaic, mac Con-Corb had two sons Trena (ancestor of the Uí Trena) and Cuircc (ancestor of Uí Cuircc / O'Quirk).

=== Flaithnia mac Echach ===
Flaithnia mac Echach, mac Fhorannain, mac Libriain, mac Fhurudrain, mac Oengusa, mac Trena, mac Fhergusa, mac Cormaic, mac Con-Corb.

=== Fland mac Nuadat (Lagen) ===
Two similar genealogies are given for Fland mac Nuadat who was the Sage and Royal Bishop of Leinster.

Flann mac Nuadat, mac Cellaich, mac Fhurudrain, mac Fhoilleain (Fóelleáin), mac Trena, mac Lugdach, mac Labrada, mac Imchada, mac Cormaic, mac Con-chorb. In the second genealogy it has Flann ... mac Fóelleáin, mac Lomthuile, mac Ceisse, mac Lugdach ...

=== Imchada mac Cormaic ===
Imchada mac Cormaic, mac Con-Corb was father of Labrada, ancestor of Uí Labrada Lagen.

=== Labrada mac Imchada ===
Labrada had seven sons, Lugdach (also Lugdech, Lugaid, Lugar), Cathbud, Cóeldub, Cainnech, Cáirthenn, Nio Cuilleen, Daig Bec.

=== Maelmaedhog mac Diarmad ===
Maelmaedhog (Mail-Máedoc) mac Diarmata was an arch-bishop associated with Gleann-Uisean. His son Fland Filí was also the Airchinneach (hereditary steward) of Gleann Uisean.

=== Mo-Chuille moccu Cormaic ===
In the year A.D. 720 the Uí Dúnlainge under Cellach mac Cennfáelad attacked an area of Dál Chormaic and their sub-tribe the Uí Gabla Roirend near Mullaghreelan in South Kildare, destroying the Uí Gabla Roirend. The holy-man of the Dál Chormaic Mo-Chuille, whose foundation of Dresan was located east of Athy by the Rath of Mullaghreelan was destroyed, leading Mo-Chuille to put a curse on the Cellach.

=== Moga Chorbb mac Conchobar Abradruad ===
Moga Chorbb (also Moga Corb) was King of Leinster. He was the son of Conchobar Abradruad (Ard Rí na hÉireann), mac Find Filé, mac Rossa Ruaid. Moga Chorbb was killed in the Battle of Bruiden Da Choca.

=== Sinchell mac Cenfhinnain ===
Sinchell mac Cenfhinnain of Cill Acaid Droma Fada an Da SinCheall. Sinchell's ancestry is given as Sinchell mac Cenfhinnain (Cenannáin), mac Macha, mac Cruaich, mac Duilge, mac Imchada, mac Brolaich, mac Lugdach, mac Imchada, mac Cormaic, mac Con-Chorb.
