= Saint Daman =

Damán of Tígh-Damáin, in Uí Criomhthannain. He was of the Dál Cormaic of the Leinstermen and a brother of St. Abbán and St. Senach of Cill-mór. His feast-day is 12 February.
