= Daig =

Saint Daig (died 588?) was an Irish Christian bishop and confessor of Inis-Caoin-Deagha (now Inniskeen, County Monaghan), who lived towards the end of the 6th century. His name in Gaelic means "A great flame" and he was probably named after his mother Deighe.

== Biography ==
Daig was born in Kiennacta Breagh, County Meath. His father was Carill, son of Laisrén, son of Dallán, son of Eógan mac Néill, son of Niall of the Nine Hostages, son of Eochaid Mugmedón.

Daig's mother's name was Dediva (also called Editua or Dedi or Deidi or Deighe or Deidiu or Deaga or Mediva), daughter of Tren, son of Dubhthach moccu Lughair, who was Chief Ollam of Ireland and royal poet of King Lóegaire mac Néill. Dediva's other children were Saint Senan of Laraghabrine, son of Fintan, Saint Diarmaid the Just, son of Lugna, Saint Caillin, son of Niata, Saint Felim of Kilmore, who was another son of Carill and Daig's older brother, Saint Femia, who was another daughter of Carill, St. Mainchín of Corann, son of Collan of Corann and Senchán Torpéist, another Chief Ollam of Ireland.

When a boy he went to the monastery of Devenish Island, County Fermanagh to study under Saint Laisrén mac Nad Froích. After finishing his studies there he went to study under Saint Comgall of Bangor monastery. When he graduated he worked as an artisan for Saint Ciarán of Saigir for whom he made 300 bells, 300 croziers and 300 Gospels which were distributed as gifts to other monasteries in Ireland.

He then founded his monastery at Inniskeen, County Monaghan. Saint Columba blessed it for him. Locals tried to kill him but failed and were expelled to the Beara Peninsula, County Cork. Saint Berach was one of his disciples. Daig performed many miracles which are enumerated in his Life. The Félire Óengusso ("Martyrology of Óengus"), states "A man of grace for our wheat was Daig, the good and great son of Cairell". He was present at the death of Carláen the bishop of Armagh who died on 24 March 588. Daige died shortly afterwards on 18 August in the same year and his feastday is celebrated on that date.

Saint Daig is mentioned in the Codex Salmanticensis (Brussels, Royal Library 7672–4) which is a medieval Irish manuscript containing an extensive collection of Irish saints' Lives.
