= Nisi Mac Niata =

Possible noble or priest in c. 6th century Ireland

- Died: South Leitrim, Ireland
- Family: Conmaicne Rein tribe
- Father: Niata
- Memorials: Moynish (plain of Nisi)

Nisi Mac Niata (or Nissi Mac Niatach, fl. 560 AD) lived in 6th century Gaelic Ireland. Nothing is known of his life, but his death left a legacy for a millennium. Namely, the Túath where he died was renamed in his honour, and his brother Saint Caillín obtained a substantial honour price in compensation under Brehon Law, securing a revenue stream for the famous monastery of Fenagh.

== Life ==
Nisi (pronounced Nishy) was born in 6th century Gaelic Ireland, the son of Niata and brother of Saint Caillín, the patron saint of Fenagh. He belonged to the tribe of Conmaicne-Rein who lived in present-day South Leitrim and West Longford. He was probably a noble or a priest, and close associate of his sibling Caillín. Little else is known of his life.

His death is described in both prose and rhyme by the ancient Book of Fenagh along the following lines. Sometime in the 5th or 6th century, Nisi and Caillín journeyed from Ard-Carna Monastery in Roscommon eastwards towards Cora Droma Rúisc crossing the river Shannon to Magh-Cellachain ("the plain of Cellachan"), staying overnight at a place named the Bennachan, (Note: The Irish: Bennachan place name is obsolete, but may correspond to present-day Keenaghan townland (Irish: Caonachán) beside Carrick on Shannon) in the home of Cellachan, who was not of the Conmaicne tribe. Next morning for some unknown reason, Nisi was killed unlawfully by Cellachan who then had to pay Nisi's brother a substantial "body fine" and honour price in compensation. Nisi was interred at Fenagh.

== Legacy ==
For the following millennium, the locality where he died was known as Moynish (Note: Moynish was variously written as Irish: m. Nisi, M. Nisse, m. neisi, Magh-Nisi, mMuig Nise, Moigi Nise, Magh-Nise, and Magh-Nissi, English: Moy-Nissi, Mag Nise, Moynishy, and Moynishe, and also called "Upper Muintir Eolais" from the High Middle Ages onwards.) ("the plain of Nisi") in his honour. Nisi's "honour price" became the perpetual claim by the monastic settlement at Fenagh to patronage from Moynish nobles.

From Cellachan the active,
The proud plain had been named;
Magh-Nissi, manifest famous,
Is its name from that time down.
Their land and their tributes,
Caillin got for the deed.

The name of Nisi was forgotten when Gaelic Ireland collapsed in the 17th century. Irish nobles had their estates confiscated in the plantations of Leitrim. The English incorporated Moynish into the barony of Leitrim and Cromwellian forces plundered Moynish in 1652. Though forgotten today, the place name of Moynish is preserved by the Irish annals and English Fiants.

== Pedigree ==
The mythical pedigree of Nisi Mac Niata is as follows:

- Nisi,
- brother of Caillín,
- Son of Niata, (or Niatach and Niataig)
- Son of Duban,
- Son of Fraech,
- Son of Cumscrach,
- Son of Echt, (or Cecht)
- Son of Erc,
- Son of Eredal, (or Erdail)
- Son of Echt, (or Cecht)
- Son of Dubh,
- Son of Moghruadh, (or Medhruagh)
- Son of Nert,
- Son of Fornert,
- Son of Echt, (or Cecht)
- Son of Uisel,
- Son of Beire, (or Beiri)
- Son of Beidhbhe, (or Beidhbe)
- Son of Doilbhre,
- Son of Lugaid Conmac, (or Lughaidh)
- Son of Oirbsen Mór, ("Oirbsen the great". See also "Loch Oirbsen", in County Galway.)
- Son of Ethedon, (or Sethdon)
- Son of Seghda,
- Son of Art, (or Atri)
- Son of Allta, (or Alta)
- Son of Oghamun, (or Ogamun)
- Son of Fidhchar,
- Son of Doilbhre,
- Son of Eon,
- Son of Cetguine Calusach,
- Son of Mochta,
- Son of Mesoman, (or Mesamun)
- Son of Mogh Taeth,
- Son of Conmac, (the mythical ancestor of the Conmhaicne tribe.)
- Son of Fergus,
- Son of Rossa,
- Son of Rudraige.

== Notes and references ==
=== Primary sources ===
- Ó Donnabháin, Sean (1828). Book of Fenagh, Translation and Copious Notes (PDF). Fenagh, Leitrim, Ireland: Maolmhordha Mac Dubhghoill Uí Raghailligh.

=== Secondary sources ===
- Hogan, Edmund (1910). "Onomasticon Goedelicum, locorum et tribuum Hiberniae et Scotiae, An index, with identifications, to the Gaelic names of places and tribes, M". University College Cork, Documents of Ireland. Edmund Hogan, SJ.
- O Rodaighe, Tadhg. "Tadhg O Rodaighe to [Edward Lhwyd], [around May 1700]" (PDF). Oxford University Research Archive. Archived from the original (PDF) on 6 October 2016.
- John, Hynes (1931). "St. Caillin". The Journal of the Royal Society of Antiquaries of Ireland. 1 (1). Royal Society of Antiquaries of Ireland, 1931: 39–54. JSTOR 25513584. (subscription required)
- O'Byrne, Charlie (1930). "The Schools' Collection 1930s, Volume 0225, Page 286". Duchas Ireland.
- Ó Donnabháin, Sean (1862). The topographical poems of John O'Dubhagain and Giolla na naomh O'Huidhrin. Irish Arachaeological and Celtic Society.
