= Dubhán of Rosglas =

Dubhán was a priest and possibly a bishop. He was of the Lagenians and brother of Damán, of Cluain Foda, in Fíodh-mór. Dubhán was of the Dál Cormaic, and also brother to St. Abbán moccu Corbmaic.

== Hagiography ==
Abbán of New Ross, a contemporary of Saint Patrick, established a monastic settlement by the banks of the River Barrow at Rosglas and gave it into the charge of his protégé Evin. Evin brought a number of monks with him from his native Munster. This gained the settlement of the name Rosglos-na-Moinneach (the greenwood of the Munstermen).

Next to nothing appears to be known of Dubhán, beyond that he seems to have been an important cleric among the Soghain in the early Irish Christian era.

The Martyrology of Donegal states that Abbán's six brothers were all bishops. It further states that it was this Dubhán who went along with St. Moling, Dubhthacht and Cúan of Cluain-mór to seek remission of the Borumha from Fínsnechta Fledach, the High-King of Ireland. (The Borumha was a triennial tribute payment, mostly in cattle.) But Dubhán, the brother of Abbán could not have been a contemporary of Moling, who died in 697.

His feast day is 11 November.
