= Senchán Torpéist =

Gaelic-Irish poet

Senchán Torpéist (c. 560–649 AD) was a Gaelic-Irish poet.

== Background ==
Seanchan Torpest was the Chief Poet of Connacht c. 640 AD when he succeeded Dallán Forgaill as Chief Ollam of Ireland. He died in c. 649 AD.

His father was Cuairfheartaigh from the Araidh sept on the northern Tipperary-Limerick border. According to suggestion of James Carney, Senchán recorded his own pedigree in a genealogical work on the Concangab Már, which he composed about 630. It states: Senchán, son of Úarchride, son of Adóer, of the Araid.

Senchan's mother's name was Dediva (also called Editua or Dedi or Deidi or Deighe or Deidiu or Deaga or Mediva), daughter of Tren, son of Dubhthach moccu Lughair, who was also a previous Chief Ollam of Ireland and royal poet of King Lóegaire mac Néill. Dediva's other children were Saint Senan of Laraghabrine, son of Fintan, Saint Diarmaid the Just, son of Lugna, Saint Felim of Kilmore son of Carill, Saint Daigh of Inniskeen son of Carill, Saint Femia, daughter of Carill, St. Mainchín of Corann, son of Collan of Corann and Saint Caillin, son of Niata, who in the Book of Fenagh, page 215 states:

"My blessing on thy men of song

Who from mild Senchan may descend.”

Seanchan must have been born about 560 AD to have allowed him time to complete the long course of study to be named Chief Ollam of Ireland. Furthermore, in Tromdámh Guaire he is referred to as "the aged Senchan" in c. 640 and Geoffrey Keating's History of Ireland states that at the Synod or Convention of Drumceat in c. 593 AD, "Seanchán mac Cuairfheartaigh" was made Chief Ollam over the province of Connacht. An explanation for his nickname is given in the Cóir Anmann (The Fitness of Names): "Entry 272: Senchán Toirpéist .i. Senchán [dororba péist] día rothogaibh spirat na h-écsi cenn do fo sceib (leg. scéim, dat. of scíam) dodheilbh, intan luidh Senchán for cuáirt a n-Albain dochoíd spirat na h-écsi a richt pesti gráinchi fora chiund forsan sligi a m-bói, gurus aigill tré fordhorcha filidhechta é. Conid [d]e rohainmniged e. (Senchán Torpest, i.e. Senchán whom a péistor monster profited when the spirit of wisdom appeared under a hideous form. At the time that Senchán went on a circuit into Scotland the spirit of poetry came in the shape of a loathly monster to meet him on his road, and conversed with him in the obscurity of poetry. Hence he was so named.)"

Senchan's wife was Brigit, his son was called Muircc or Murgen and his daughter was Maeve Neidigh.

Some of Senchan's work is preserved in the Book of Lecan, folio 17, col. 2, a poem on the battles of Fergus, son of Rossa. He wrote a poem beginning "Abbair fri sil nEogain moir", in Laud 610, fol 73 b 2 (ZCP 12, 1918, p. 378 Kuno Meyer); another called Trí meic Ruaid; another beginning Find Taulcha tuath cuire Cailte and a poem beginning "Co slonnad Conmaic fri Connad" (ZCP 14 1923 p. 48 Margaret Dobbs). Cath Maighe Léna contains a poem by Senchán commencing 'Adhaigh Luain rucadh an rí'.

In a list of ancient Irish authors contained in the Book of Ballymote, p. 308, it states "Sencan Toirpeist in Rigfili".

== King Guaire of Connacht ==
According to the old tale called Tromdámh Guaire (The Heavy Company of Guaire) or Imtheacht na Tromdhaimhe (The Proceedings of the Great Bardic Institution) he visited the residence of the King of Connacht, Guaire Aidne mac Colmáin accompanied by one hundred and fifty other poets, one hundred and fifty pupils "with a corresponding number of women-servants, dogs, etc". The accommodating powers of Guaire's establishment were strained during their stay of "a year, a quarter, and a month."

To shame Seanchan into leaving, Guaire asked him to recite the long-forgotten epic the Táin Bó Cúailnge, with the words:

Bear the cup to Seanchan Torpest
Yield the bard his poet's mead
What we've heard was but a fore-taste
Lays more lofty now succeed.

Though my stores be emptied well-nigh
Twin bright cups there yet remain
Win them with the raid of Cualigne
Chant us, bard, the famous Tain.

Seanchan was deeply offended;

Thus in hall of Gort spoke Guaire
for the king, let truth be told
bounteous though he was, was weary
of giving goblets, giving gold
giving aught the Bard demanded
but when for the Tain he called
Seanchan from his seat descended
shame and anger fired the skald.

Seanchan departed, with the following farewall:

We depart from thee, O stainless Guaire
A year, a quarter, and a month
Have we sojourned with thee, high King
Three times fifty poets, good and smooth
Three times fifty students in the poetic art
Each with a servant and a dog
They were all fed in the one great house.

Each man had his separate meal
Each man had his separate bed
We never arose at early morning
Without contentions, without calming.

I declare to Thee, God
Who canst the promise verify
That, should we return to our own lands
We shall visit thee again, O Guaire, tho' now we depart.

== Táin Bó Cúailnge ==
The result of this incident was the gathering of all the poets of Ireland by Seanchan, to determine which one of them knew the entire of the Táin. While some knew different parts, none knew the whole epic; it been written in a book long since taken abroad.

To rectify this, Seanchan, accompanied by his son Murgen and his second cousin Eimena, undertook to travel in search of the book and return the Táin to Ireland.

This resulted in Murgen being lost in a magical mist, when he encountered the ghost of Fergus mac Róich at his grave. Fergus related the whole of the Tain to Murgen, who returned and related the story to his brother and father, thus preserving the tale for future generations.

Senchan and his wife also appear in the old tale Scéla Cano meic Gartnáin and in Cormac's Glossary where he visits the Isle of Man. The Middle-Irish poem c. 1100 'Aimirgein Glúngel tuir tend', attributed to Gilla in Choimded Úa Cormaic of Tulach Léis, refers to Senchan- Stanza 57. "Senchán Toirpéist ba rind ráid." ('Senchán Torpéist he was the apex of speech'). He also appears in the tale "Mac telene do feraib Muman".

Senchan's wandering band of poets occur in traditional tales as far apart as Scotland and Nova Scotia, where they are referred to as "Cliar Sheanachain" (Senchan's lot) or "Cleith Sheanchair". A popular Highland tale featuring Senchan is "Great Bríd of the Horses" which is based on 'Tromdámh Guaire'.

== References by Shakespeare ==
William Shakespeare mentions the power of Irish poets "rhyming rats to death", a remark apparently based on an incident when Seanchan, finding that rats had eaten his dinner, uttered the vindictive aer: "Rats have sharp snouts/Yet are poor fighters..." which killed ten of them on the spot.

Preceded by Dallán Forgaill	Chief Ollam of Ireland c.640–c.649	Succeeded by Máel Muire Othain

Unknown	Chief Poet of Connacht ?–598	Succeeded by Ceallach ua Maílcorgus
