= Newtowncashel =

Village in County Longford, Ireland

Newtowncashel Baile Nua an Chaisil
- Village
- Location in Ireland
- Coordinates: 53.587°N 7.938°W
- Country: Ireland
- Province: Leinster
- County: County Longford
- Irish grid reference: N041599

Newtowncashel (Irish: Baile Nua an Chaisil, meaning 'new town of the fort') is a village located near Lough Ree in County Longford, Ireland. Newtowncashel won the Irish Tidy Towns Competition in 1980.

== History ==
=== Name ===
Situated on the north-eastern shore of Lough Ree on the River Shannon, Newtowncashel was previously known as Cor na Dumhca in Irish - an ancient name meaning the 'Round Hill of the Cauldron'.

=== Built heritage ===
There are a number of ringfort sites close to the village, including several in the townlands of Cornadowagh, Ballyrevagh and Cross.

Five castles are recorded in the area, including Elfeet, Caltramore, Corool, Portanure and the castle of Baile Nui (Newtown). The ruins of Elfeet Castle can still be seen. George Calvert, the owner of a 15th-century tower house in the area, was involved in the colonisation of the Province of Maryland in America. This property was granted to George Calvert in 1621 by King James I as one of two tracts of land in the plantation of Longford along with one in Drumlish.

=== Religious sites ===
Two historic religious sites in the Newtowncashel area are Inis Clothrann (or Quakers Island) where St Diarmuid founded an abbey in 540 AD, and Saints' Island where St Kevin founded a monastery in 544 AD. The ruins of the old parish church, St Catherine's, are on the side of Cashel Hill overlooking Lough Ree.

During the period of the Penal Laws, when Catholic observances were outlawed, people in the parish of Cashel assembled for worship at mass rocks close to Lady Well (in Derrydarragh townland) and at Derryhaun.

The current Roman Catholic church was built in 1833 in a Gothic Revival style.

== Amenities ==
Culnagore Wood (Wood of the Oak) covers an area of 90 acres along the edge of Lough Ree. Also nearby is Carrowmore Wood, a forest of pine and spruce on a hill within the parish. A short distance from the village is Lough Slawn, which is surrounded by meadows and bog lands. Cashel Commons ('The Ranch') is a 200-acre commonage which has several walking routes.

Barley Harbour is a cut-limestone harbour located outside the village on the lakeshore. Four groups of islands are in the parish of Cashel: the Black Islands; Clawinch, Priests' Island and Inis Clothrann. On Saints' Island are the ruins of an Augustinian monastery where a canon, Augustine McGradion (Uighistin Mag Ráidhin), compiled the Annals of [All] Saints (Annales Prioratus Insulae Omnium SS) in the 15th century. This island can now be accessed via a causeway.

== See also ==
- List of towns and villages in Ireland
