= Caillín =

6th-century Irish saint

Saint Caillin
- Born: 5th century Conmaicne Dun Mor
- Venerated in: Catholic Church; Eastern Orthodox Church
- Feast: 13 November
- Patronage: Fenagh, County Leitrim

Saint Caillin (fl. c.570) was an Irish medieval saint and monastic founder. His Feast day is celebrated on 13 November. The patron saint of Fenagh, County Leitrim, Caillin was born in the 6th century and founded a monastic settlement at Fenagh. His history was given in the Old Book of Fenagh (no longer extant; material included in the Book of Fenagh). The Annals of the Four Masters mentioning him living in 464 is based on the late 16th century Book of Fenagh, which is a piece of literature considered unreliable without other historical records. Caillín's siblings lived in the second half of the 6th century, so it is likely Caillín lived at the same time. This date is also supported by his position in the Irish genealogies and by the Life of Saint Mogue (born c.560), who was taught by Caillín.

== Life ==
Caillin was born in Conmaicne Dun Mor (now north County Galway). Caillin's mother's name was Dediva (also called Editua, Dedi, Deidi, Deighe, Deidiu, or Deaga), daughter of Tren, son of Dubhthach moccu Lughair, who was Chief Ollam of Ireland and royal poet of King Lóegaire mac Néill. Dediva's other children were Saint Senan of Laraghabrine, son of Fintan, Saint Diarmaid the Just, son of Lugna, St.Mainchín of Corann, son of Collan of Corann, Saint Felim of Kilmore son of Carill, Saint Daigh of Inniskeen son of Carill, Saint Femia daughter of Carill and Senchán Torpéist, another Chief Ollam of Ireland. Caillin was the third eldest of Dediva's children.

Caillin had another brother named Nisi Mac Niata.

== Saint Fintan and Rome ==
Caillin studied under St. Fintan. To complete his studies, he went to Rome, and was given 300 ounces of solid red gold by St. Fintan gave him 30o. At the end of a long period of study in Rome, he returned, bringing with him relics of the apostles and a cloth made by the Virgin Mary and used when she fed the infant Jesus. According to the Book of Fernagh, Caillin returned to Ireland twelve years after the arrival of Patrick, who later consecrated him bishop.

== Fenagh abbey ==
He founded a monastic site at Fenagh, County Leitrim, which was then the territory of the Conmhaicne Magh Rein, part of the overkingdom of Breifne. He became the patron saint of Fenagh and the Conmaicne of Magh Rein.

In stories, it is said an angel was sent to Caillin to show him the site of the Abbey at Fenagh. When Caillin commenced the erection of the monastery, Fergal mac Fergus, King of Breifne, sent his son, Aedh Dubh, with his warriors to drive Caillin away. Caillin then converted Aedh Dubh and his men. Fergus next sent his druids to destroy him, but Caillin turned the Druids into stones which gives its name to the townland called Longstone (beside Edentenny on the Fenagh Ballinamore road.) These standing stones of the Druids are still visible at Longstone.

The legend of St Caillin spread through the land. Fenagh was celebrated for its school, which students from all over Ireland and Europe came to study, among whom was Saint Mogue of the neighbouring parish of Templeport. Other stories claim many of Ireland's Kings are secretly buried in the ancient graveyards adjoining the Abbey.

== Táin Bó Cúailnge ==
Caillin is said to have helped his brother Senchán Torpéist to recover the lost tale called Táin Bó Cúailnge. The tale had vanished almost completely from the memory of the fili (story tellers-poets) of Ireland. Some of them knew one part and some another, but no one knew the whole of it. Caillin invited Columcille, Ciarán of Clonmacnoise, Brendan of Birr and Brendan son of Finnlogh, to meet at the grave of the great hero of the Tain Bo Chuailgne Fergus mac Róich. There they fasted and prayed for three days and three nights, after which Fergus, who had been dead 500 years, appeared to them and related the whole story of the Tain. Thus, the celebrated epic was preserved in the book of the Dun Cow, so called because its parchment was made from the hide of St. Ciaran's favourite cow.

== Prophecy ==
Being buried in the graveyard is believed to be of high importance, given in a prophecy given by St. Caillin. It states that, as he lay dying, he said anyone buried in the Fenagh Abbey graveyard and 'in full observance of the true faith' will go straight to Heaven upon their death.

== St. Caillin's Well ==
St. Caillin's holy well is located in Keeraunmore in Ballyconneely. It is associated with him as, like St. MacDara, he had a long affinity with seafarers. The well has been a popular place of pilgrimage for centuries, and is mentioned in O‟ Flaherty‟s history of 1684. Around the well are a number of penitential stations, one of which is known as St. Caillin's Bed. Also associated with St. Caillin is Chapel Island, not far offshore from his well. This island contains the ruins of an early Christian chapel. The holy well and penitential stations are now only visited on the saint's day, 13 November.

== Pedigree ==
His pedigree is given as follows:

- Caillin, mac Niata mac Duban mac Fraech mac Cumscrach mac Echt mac Ere mac Ercdal mac Echt mac Dubh mac Moghruadh mac Nert mac Fornert mac Echt mac Beidhbhe mac Doilbhre mac Lugaid Conmac mac Oirbsen Mor mac Ethedon mac Seghda mac Art mac Allta mac Oghamun, mac Fidhchar mac Doilbhre mac Eon mac Cetguine Calusach mac Conmac mac Mochta mac Fergus mac Róich mac Mesoman mac Rossa mac Mogh Taeth mac Rudraige mac Sithrigi.

== Mac Giolla Chaillín/Kilgallin ==
The family name Mac Giolla Chaillín means (son of) devotee of St. Caillin. The surname is also commonly Anglicized as Kilcullen, Kilgallen, Kilgallon and Clyne, and is found mainly in County Mayo and County Sligo. Bearers of the name include T.J. Kilgallon and Matthew Kilgallon.

== See also ==
- Aillebrack National School, also known as St. Caillín's National School.

== Sources ==
- Hynes, Rev. John; "St. Caillin" in J.R.S.A.I.; Vol. LXI (1931), pp. 39–54.

=== Secondary sources ===
- O'Donovan, John, ed. (1856). Annála Rioghachta Éireann. Annals of the Kingdom of Ireland by the Four Masters ... with a Translation and Copious Notes. 7 vols. Translated by O'Donovan (2nd ed.). Dublin: Royal Irish Academy. CELT editions. Full scans at Internet Archive: Vol. 1; Vol. 2; Vol. 3; Vol. 4; Vol. 5; Vol. 6; Indices.
