= Muiris mac Torna Ó Maolconaire =

Muiris mac Torna Ó Maolconaire, dead 1645, was an Irish scribe, historian and poet.

== Background ==
Muiris was a son of Torna Ó Maolconaire, and a native of Cluain Plocáin, County Roscommon. He may have owned land in the parish of Kiltrustan. He was a member of the Ó Maolconaire family, and is sometimes confused with Muirgheas mac Pháidín Ó Maolconaire, another prominent member of Muiris mac Torna's sept, the Sliocht Pháidín.

== Annals of the Four Masters ==
He worked for one month, strictly as a scribe, on the compilation of the Annals of the Four Masters.

According to Bernadette Cunningham (p. 261)

"Much of the autograph manuscript of the first half of AFM now preserved in RIA MS C iii 3 is believed to be in his hand. Muiris ... had worked as a poet as well as a seanchaidh (historian/chronicler), composing poems in praise of Sir Lucas Dillon and his wife, on Brian Mac Diarmada (d. 1636) and Aodh Ó Conchobhair (d. 1632). It is possible, though not proven, that he was the son of the Torna mac Eoluis Uí Mhaoil Chonaire, whose influence Ó Cléirigh acknowledged in print in 1643. If so, this would mean that Muiris mac Torna was another member of Sliocht Pháidín, and also a direct descendant of the scribe of the Book of Fenagh. Such a genealogical link would provide the context for Muiris's ownership of a vellum manuscript containing a text of Naoimhsenchus naomh Insi Fáil used as an exemplar by Mícheál Ó Cléirigh in April 1636."

== Elegy ==
After his death in 1645, the poet Maolmhuire mac Eóghain Ó hUiginn composed Máthar na horcha an égsi (Poetry is the mother of sorrow), which emphasised his work as a poet, rather than that of a historian, genealogist or scribe. He was the only individual of the six-member team who compiled the Four Masters who was

"commemorated by his own contemporaris with a traditional poetic lament. That is an indication that Muiris had a successful scholarly career and is a reminder that his relatively minor role in the AFM project should not be interpreted as implying that his scholarship was in any way inferior to that of the others of the 'Four Masters' team. ... he was not a 'junior' ..., either in terms of age or experience, or as a potential facilitator of access to important manuscript sources."

(Cunningham, p. 262)

This is confirmed by a note written by Sir James Ware about 1636, when he recorded that he received the vellum fragment of annals he knew as Annales Prioratus Insulae Omnium SS in Loghree (now Bodleian MS Rawlinson B 488, folios 29–34) from Muiris mac Torna in August 1627 (dono dedit Mauritius Conry 27 Augusti 1627.)

== Sources ==
- Marbhna ar Mhuiris Mac Torna Uí Mhaoilchonaire, Réamann Ó Muireadhaigh, Eigse 15:3 (1974), pp. 295–21.
- Muirgheas Ó Maolconaire of Cluain Plocáin: an early sixteenth-century Connacht scribe at work, Bernadette Cunningham and Raymond Gillespie, Studia Hibernica 35 (2008–09), pp. 17–43.
- Muiris Ó Maolconaire, in Dictionary of Irish biography (9 vols, Cambridge, 2009)
- The Annals of the Four Masters: Irish history, kingship and society in the early seventeenth century, p. 60, 142–3, 261, 262, 275, Bernadette Cunningham, Four Courts Press, 2010. ISBN 978-1-84682-203-2.
