= Ardristan standing stones =

Two menhirs in County Carlow, Ireland

- Location within Ireland
- 52.786852°N 6.753659°W
- Location: Ardristan, Tullow, County Carlow, Ireland

Site notes
- Material: Granite
- Height: 2.4 metres (7.9 ft)
- Width: 1.56 metres (5.1 ft)

The Ardristan standing stones are two menhirs near Tullow, County Carlow. The stones are located 50 metres (160 ft) apart, separated by a road. The larger of the stones is 2.8 m (9 ft 2 in) tall and has 6 vertical grooves, some of which are artificial. The stones lie approximately 1 kilometre (0.62 mi) north/north-west of the Aghade Holed Stone.
