= Record of Monuments and Places =

Heritage database of Ireland

The Record of Monuments and Places (RMP; Irish: Taifead ar Shéadchomharthaí agus Áiteanna) is a list of historical and archaeological sites the Republic of Ireland established under the National Monuments Acts.

It can be consulted in county libraries and local authority offices and online and is maintained by the Department of Culture, Heritage and the Gaeltacht's National Monuments Service.

Each site receives a symbol of the format XX00-001---, where XX are two letters to indicate the county. Subsites of a site are in the format XX00-00101-. For example, the Aghade Holed Stone (located in County Carlow) has the RMP code CW013-032---. It is also National Monument number 347; the two numbering schemes are not connected.

While many sites recorded on the RMP are protected under the National Monuments Acts, not all entries are automatically afforded heritage protection.

== See also ==
- National monument (Ireland)
- National Inventory of Architectural Heritage
- Northern Ireland Sites and Monuments Record
