= Aghalurcher Monastery =

Pre-Norman ruins in County Fermanagh, Northern Ireland

Coordinates: 54°14′04″N 07°27′06″W

Aghalurcher
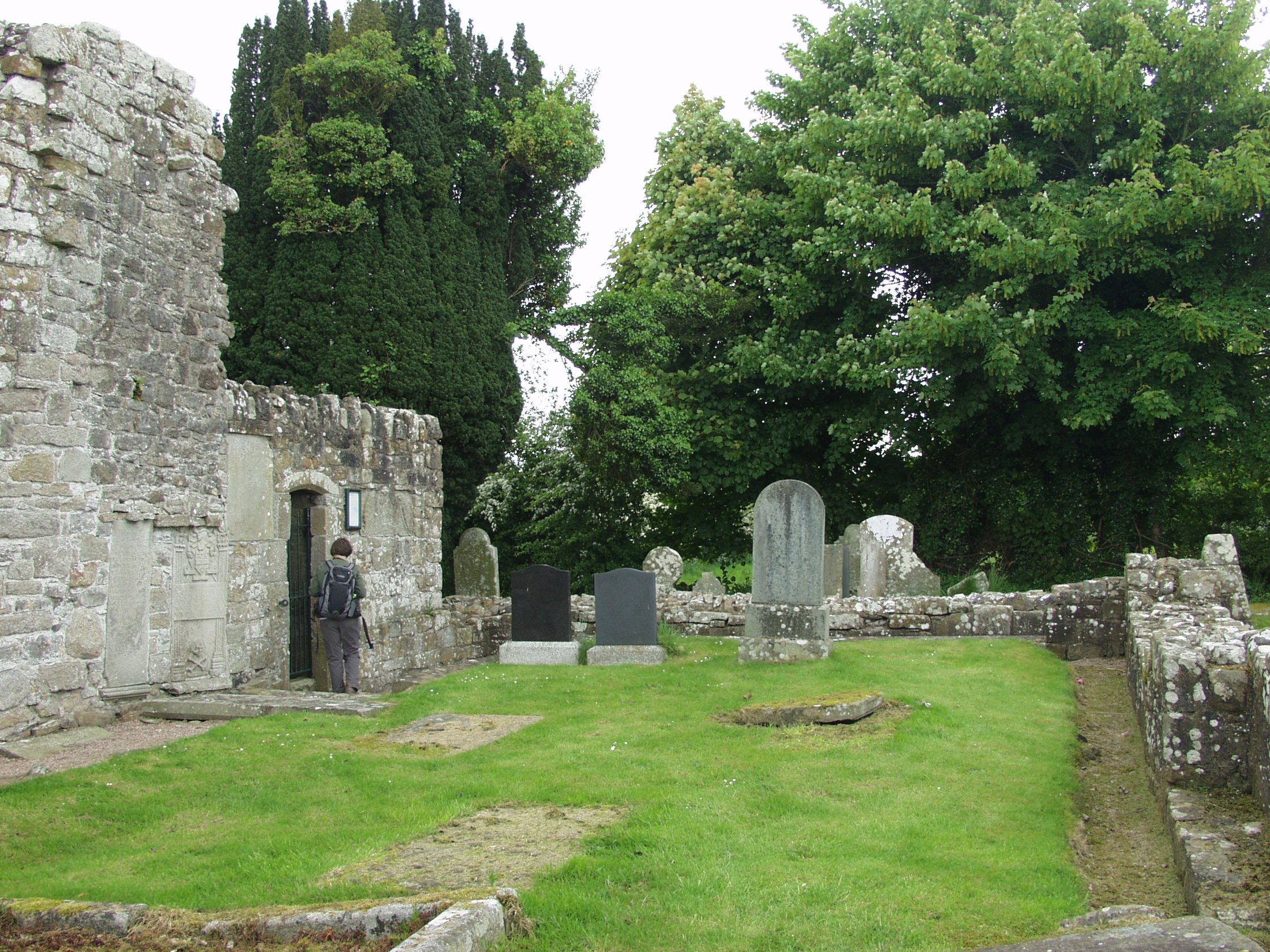
- Aghalurcher Church Yard

Monastery information
- Established: 6th-early 7th century?
- Disestablished: c. 1484
- Diocese: Diocese of Clogher RC, Diocese of Clogher CI

People
- Founders: St. Ronan, son of Aedh Dubh

Site
- Location: Very near Lisnaskea in the south-east of modern-day County Fermanagh

Aghalurcher (Irish: Achad-urchaire, Achad-lurchaire, meaning 'Field of the Cast') was a pre-Norman monastery located east of the shore of Upper Lough Erne in the south of Fermanagh in Ulster, founded according to legend by Saint Ronan in the sixth to early seventh century and dedicated to him in the ninth century.

The site includes the ruins of a medieval church with a small gated vault (locked) — where sculptural fragments are stored — and a gateway constructed with stones from the church. The church was remodeled in 1447 by Thomas Maguire, with a new roof added. Up until the early 17th century, the Maguires were the ruling family of Fermanagh, and Aghalurcher was their main burial place. The site seems to have been abandoned after a murder on the altar effectively deconsecrated the church.

The site includes some interesting gravestones of the late eighteenth century, plus an early medieval carved head on the gateway. Additional sculptural fragments from the site are at the Fermanagh County Museum at Enniskillen Castle.

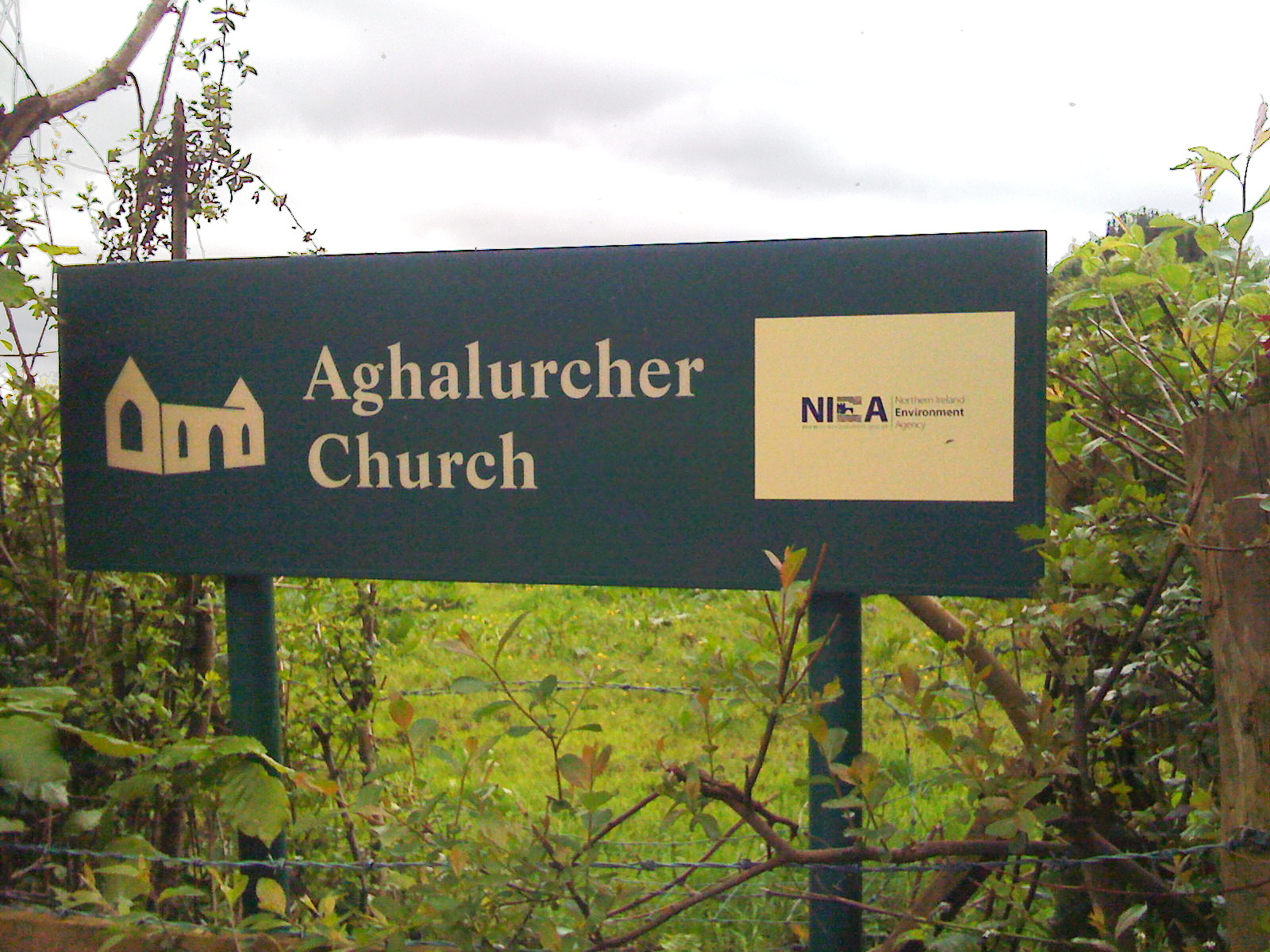
Aghalurcher signpost on east side of Newbridge Road

== Saints associated with Aghalurcher Monastery ==
- Saint Ronan
- Saint Feidhlimidh (Saint Felim)
