= Ballymoon Castle =

Ruined castle in County Carlow, Ireland

Coordinates: 52.700°N 6.907°W

- Caisleán Baile Muáin (Irish)
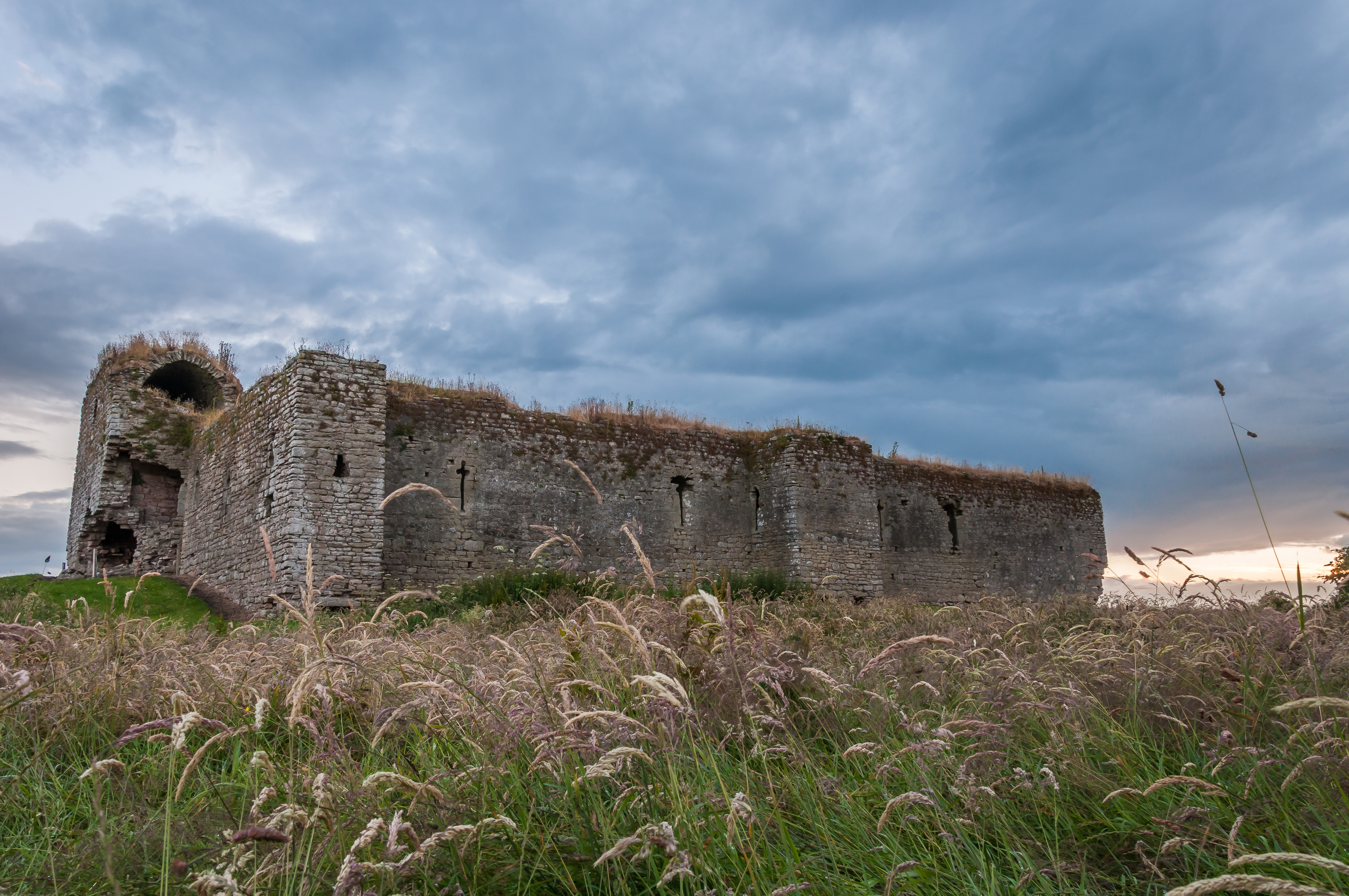
- Ballymoon Castle
- Interactive map of Ballymoon Castle
- Location: 2 miles (3 km) east of Bagenalstown, County Carlow, Ireland

History
- Built: c. 1290–1310

Site notes
- Architect: Roger Bigod

National monument of Ireland
- Official name: Ballymoon Castle
- Reference no.: 486

Ballymoon Castle (Irish: Caisleán Baile Muáin) is a National Monument situated 2 miles (3 km) east of Bagenalstown, County Carlow, Ireland. The castle is thought to date from the 13th century.

== Location and access ==
Ballymoon Castle is about 2 miles (3 km) east of Bagenalstown in a field next to the Fennagh road. The castle is accessible to the public, with access via a small wooden bridge over a ditch. Visitors can access the castle walls at ground level. Ballymoon Castle is a National Monument.

== Structure ==
The castle is in ruins and consists of a square courtyard about 80 feet (24 m) on each side, with 20-foot (6.1 m) high granite walls that are about 8 feet (2.4 m) wide at the base. The inside of the castle is open with an internal courtyard surrounded by the buildings, and the foundations show where the doors and fireplaces were positioned. The large double fireplace on the north side was part of the great hall. There are few traces of the interior structure apart from the foundations, although the remnants of some two storey structures can be seen built against the inside walls; this has led to speculation that the castle was never completed. The wall on the western side has an arched gateway. Portcullis grooves can be seen on the gateway, and there may have been a barbican in front. A number of cross shaped gun loops and arrow slits can be seen in the castle walls.

== History ==
Ballymoon Castle is thought to have been built in the 13th century or early 14th century. Much of the history has been lost, but it is thought to have been built by Roger Bigod, 5th Earl of Norfolk, in the turbulent times, or by the Carew family, who acquired the land when Bigod died without issue. In the late 1800s, the castle was bought by Michael Sheill from Wexford who established a number of local businesses.

== See also ==
- List of National Monuments in County Carlow
