= Tromdámh Guaire =

Irish piece of prose satire

Tromdámh Guaire (also known as Imtheacht na Tromdhaimhe, Imthecht na Tromdaime) is an Irish piece of prose satire about the relationship between the patron and poet and the abuse of privilege. Although the text itself is difficult to date, it is believed to have been composed no earlier than 1300. The only surviving copy of this text is found in the manuscript Leabhar Mhic Cárthaigh Riabhaigh or the Book of Lismore which itself dates to the fifteenth century. The story is set in seventh-century Ireland and is a literary showcase and parody of the practice of satire that was common among professional poets at the time. Tromdámh Guaire takes on a humorous look at the Bardic Order which a twelfth-century audience would have been aware of in order to "fully appreciate the biting sarcasm and satire contained in the narrative". This retrospective view does not give us an insight into seventh century Ireland, rather the twelfth-century perceptions of seventh century Ireland.

== Title ==
There is some amount of ambiguity when it comes to the meaning of the title, Tromdámh Guaire. Patrick Ford translates it as "Guaire’s Greedy Guests". He further explains this by adding that trom means heavy or burdensome and dámh means "a company, a legitimate number of guests, party; a bardic company, poets". Féargal Ó Béarra on the other hand gives a more insightful translation of the title with "the excessive poetic retinue which afflicted Guaire". With both translations of the title however, the same message is made clear. It has been recently translated in to Modern Irish as An Tromdhámh.

== Synopsis ==
In Tromdámh Guaire, there are three main characters; Dallán Forgaill, Senchán Torpéist and Guaire Aidne mac Colmáin. The story starts off by introducing the reader to Dallán who is the poet for King Hugh Finn of Bréifne at the time. The King of Oriel, Hugh son of Duach and Hugh Finn are very competitive with each other. Hugh Finn wanted to attain the king of Oriel’s ever-powerful shield, so he asks Dallán to demand it from him as payment for a poem. Dallán agrees to this and arrives at the King of Oriel’s home reciting poetry, asking for the shield. Hugh son of Duach offers Dallán all sorts of riches in return for his poetry but did not want to part with his shield as it was not appropriate for a poet to demand something of the sort. Dallán persists with his demands but to no avail and so he satirises him. On his way home he becomes ill and dies soon after because he had unjustly satirised the King of Oriel.

Dallán was the ollam, or head poet of the Bardic Order and after his death the other poets decide that Senchán should become the new ollam. Senchán in turn decides that he and the poets should pay a visit to Guaire, who boasts his reputation of having never been satirised. Guaire pays them all a very warm welcome by feeding them and accommodating them with great hospitality and generosity. Over the time of their visit however, the poets become very demanding and needy, ordering a number of impossible tasks they want Guaire to complete for them. Guaire must meet these demands or else he will be satirised by them. In his despair, Guaire prays that he is killed, because he would rather die than have his reputation damaged.

Marbán, Guaire’s brother and swineherd, chief prophet of heaven and earth helps him complete all the tasks they ask. Although Marbán helped Guaire, was not happy with the poets because their demands were ridiculous and unreasonable. However, all the requests were carried out just as asked. One night when the poets are feasting, Senchán decides he is very unhappy with the situation. This worries Guaire, as he fears Senchán may satirise him. He does everything he possibly can to tend to his needs but nothing will please the ollam. Senchán then becomes restless and rowdy and begins to satirise even the mice on the floor. He then moves on to satirise the cats, and the chief cat, Irusán. Irusán hears of this and arrives at Guaire’s home to attack Senchán. Senchán is terrified of Irusán and is being brutally attacked by him so he begins to sing praise poetry of him, but it is too late. Irusán however does not end up killing Senchán and so, Guaire is not satirised and the poets return home to their lodge.

One day some time later, Marbán decides he will seek revenge from the poets because of their atrocious behaviour and abuse of power. He travels to their lodge and demands they entertain him with performance. They are obliged to meet his request because he is related to the granddaughter of a poet. He requests that they recite for him the story of the Cattle Raid of Cooley, an Táin Bó Cuailnge. They cannot meet his request however because they do not know the tale, nor have they ever heard of it. Marbán finds this incredibly ignorant and puts a curse on them so that they shall not rest under the same roof two nights in a row until they find an Táin Bó Cuailnge and can recite it for him.

The poets travel Ireland and Scotland for a year until they eventually find out that the only person who knows the story is Fergus mac Róich. Fergus who is dead, is summoned from the grave and recites the story while the poets write it down. When Fergus returns to his grave, shortly after the poets recite an Táin Bó Cuailnge for Marbán and the curse is lifted. Marbán gives them only one condition that they must follow from now on, the company of professional poets would be abolished and each poet would return to his home town to work independently. They all swear to this and the story says that since that day, the professional poets have never worked collectively ever again.

== Distinctiveness ==
There are a number of factors that make this piece of writing unique. First of all, the language of the text is not of classical modern Irish like most pieces of literature from the era. Writing poetry and prose was largely dominated by the professional poets and so the vast majority of surviving texts were written in their high-register. It is unlike the formal language of professional poetry, but similar to the language that was spoken at the time. Secondly, it is unusual because of its focus on the poet as a prominent character. Tromdámh Guaire was notably produced by an author who was outside the circle of professional poets, but who knew of the Bardic Order and the tradition of professional poets. This is apparent when reading the text. Thirdly, the text contains at least one riddle, examples of which are very rare in medieval Irish literature. Thus, when Marban returns to the hall to punish the poets, his wisdom is tested through a number of questions, including the following riddle: 'What good thing did man find on earth that God did not find?—A worthy master.'
