= Odran (disciple of Saint Patrick) =

Saint Odran, Oran or Odhran, Martyr
- Cause of death: martyred with a spear
- Venerated in: Catholic Church, Eastern Orthodox Church
- Feast: 19 February
- Attributes: palm branch, cross

Odran or Odhran (fl. 430) was the charioteer of Saint Patrick and the first Christian martyr in Irish history.

== Life ==
There are two different versions given about Odran's martyrdom. The first, in the Vita tripartita Sancti Patricii, states that on the borders of the future counties of Kildare and Offaly, the chieftain of that district, Failge Berraide, worshiped the pagan god Crom Cruach and vowed to avenge the god's destruction at Magh Slécht by killing Patrick. Odran overheard the plot, and as he and Patrick set out in the chariot to continue their journey, requested that he be allowed to hold the place of honour instead of Patrick, who granted his wish; scarcely had they set out when a lance pierced Odran's heart, who by changing places saved Patrick's life.

The second version, contained in the pseudo-historical prologue (PHP) to the Senchas Már, the High-King Lóegaire mac Néill (died 462) suggests dispatching an assassin to kill someone from Patrick's household in order to test his preaching of forgiveness. (Note: Manuscript D of the PHP, used by Carey is the Leabhar na h-Uidhre (LU). However, the LU text may be referred to as "Comthóth Lóegairi" or "the Conversion of Loegaire", rather than PHP.) The assassin is identified as King Lóegaire's brother Nuada (or nephew [?]) (Note: Nuada Derg being the king's brother is supported by several sources:" Laws of the Ancient Irish" (1866) Dublin University Magazine LXVII, p. 5; Richard Robert Cherry (1890), etc. But Patterson (1991), p. 197 only commits to the killer Núadu being "a close agnatic kinsman" of the king, even though the operative Irish word derbrathair means "brother" according to the DIL.) in the second paragraph quoted below, it being a paraphrase of the beginning sections of the PHP. (Note: To quote Carey: "then under the heading"... it [ms. C] gives a paraphrase of our §§2-4 [i.e., of the PHP proper, in 11 sections] .. presented as Appendix II below".) (Note: Note that Nuada is also identified in the margins of the LU (manuscript D) text.)

The cause of the Senchus [Mor] having been composed was this:—Patrick came to Erin to baptize and to disseminate religion among the Gaedhil, i.e. in the ninth year of Theodosius and in the fourth year of Laeghaire, King of Erin, son of Niall. (Note: This first paragraph is not part of Carey's "the reason for the composition of the poem" text, printed as Appendix II.)

But the cause of the Poem (Note: The "Poem" here refers to the one regarding Dubhthach's judgment, viz. infra.) having been composed was as follows: (Note: The italics mark the words added in the English translation for the sake of intelligibility.)—Laeghaire ordered his people to kill a man of Patrick's people; and Laeghaire agreed to give his own award to the person who should kill the man, that he might discover whether he (Patrick) would grant forgiveness for it. And Nuada Derg, the son of Niall, the brother of Laeghaire, (Note: The words "brother of Lóegaire" (derbrathair do Legaire) here is actually an interlinear text, "added above line".) who was in captivity in the hands of Laeghaire, heard this, and he said that if he were released and got other rewards, he would kill one of Patrick's people. And the command of Laeghaire's cavalry was given him, and he was released from captivity, and he gave guarantee that he would fulfil his promise; and he took his lance and went towards the clerics, and hurled the lance at them and slew Odran, Patrick's charioteer.

Patrick then asked the Chief Ollam of Ireland, Dubhthach moccu Lughair to try the case, and this places the poet in a quandary because if he didn't impose an eric-fine this would seem an affront to Patrick, while if he did impose an eric, it would be an affront to God. However, Patrick assured him he would be inspired by God to speak what is right, and Dubhthach, after reciting the Senchus Mor as poetry, encompassing the Brehon law of Ireland, also referred to here as Patrick's law. pronounced judgment on the killer Nuada, who was condemned to death, though his soul went to Heaven.

This was the earliest judgement on the conflicting values of Christian and pagan laws in Ireland.

== Veneration ==
Saint Odhran is regarded as the first native Irish martyr to be martyred in Ireland.

Due to the similarity of the name some people have identified Odhran with Odhran of Iona. There is a link in the tradition that both men voluntarily sacrificed themselves in assisting the work of a greater saint, however it is generally accepted that they were two distinct persons.
