= Inchcleraun =

Lake island in Ireland

Native name: Inis Cloithrinn Nickname: Quaker Island
- Location within island of Ireland

Geography
- Location: River Shannon
- Coordinates: 53.584°N 8.011°W
- Area: 0.577 km^{2} (0.223 sq mi)

Administration
- Ireland
- Province: Leinster
- County: Longford

Demographics
- Population: 0

Additional information

National monument of Ireland
- Official name: Inchcleraun
- Reference no.: 91

Inchcleraun (Irish: Inis Cloithrinn), also called Quaker Island, is an island situated in Lough Ree on the River Shannon, in central Ireland.

The island is home to the ruins of St. Diarmaid's Monastery, a monastery founded by Diarmaid the Just in AD 560. These buildings constitute a National Monument.

== The island ==
Inchcleraun is an island of 57.7 ha (143 acres) located in the centre of Lough Ree, with Knockcroghery, County Roscommon to its west and Newtowncashel, County Longford to its east.

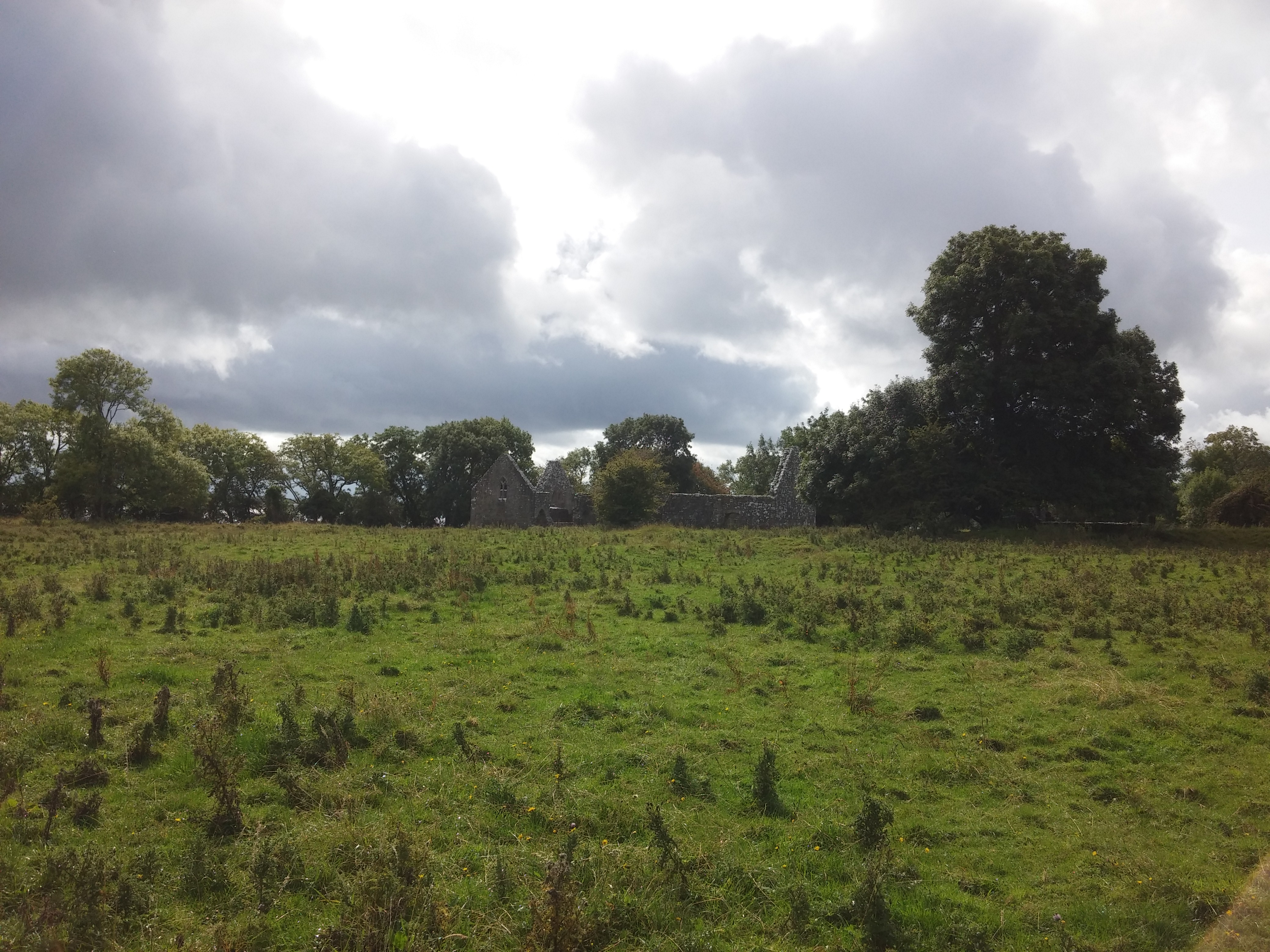
Inchcleraun Monastery

== History ==
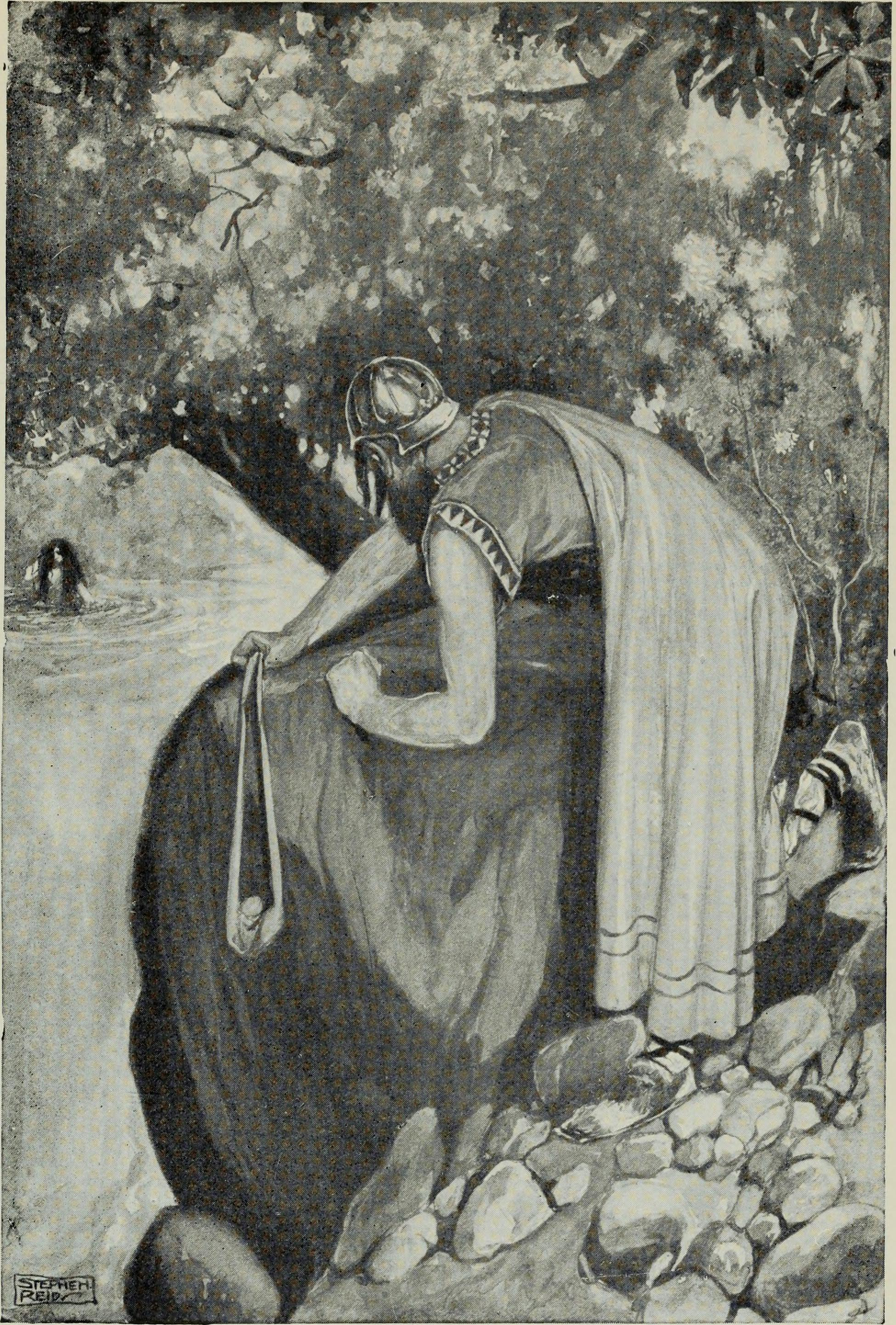
"The Death of Maev" (T. W. Rolleston, 1910); Forbay with sling in foreground, Medb bathing in the background.

The island takes its name from Irish for "Clothru's Island". In Irish legend, Clothru was a daughter of Eochu Feidlech, then High King of Ireland. She became the Queen of Connacht after her father's death, and once owned the island. Her sister, Medb, retired to Inchcleraun after Medb's husband Ailill mac Máta killed her lover Fergus mac Róich. One point is called Grianan Meva ("Medb's sunny place"), and nearby is Innadmarfa Meva (Ionad Marbhtha Meidhbhe, "Place of Medb's death"), where she was killed by a stone thrown from Elfeet Castle, on the Longford side of the lake. In other versions of the legend, it is a lump of cheese fired from a slingshot by a nephew of Clothru.

The name "Quaker Island" is more recent, and owes to the island being owned at one time by a Quaker. The monuments today are owned by the Irish state.

=== Annalistic references ===
- 719 St Sionnach of Inchcleraun died on 20 April.
- 769 Curoi, the son of Alniadh, Abbot and Sage of Inchcleraun, and of Caill Fochladha (Lough Derravaragh) in Meath died.
- 780 Eochaidh, the son of Focartach, Abbot of Fochladha and of Inchcleraun, died.
- 1010 The men of Munster plundered Inchcleraun and Inis Bo-finne
- 1050 Inchcleraun was plundered.
- 1087 The fleet of the men of Munster, with Muirchertach Ua Briain, sailed on the Shannon to Lough Ree and plundered the islands of the lake (inc. Inchcleraun)
- 1136 Áed Ua Finn (Hugh O'Flynn), the Bishop of Bréifne, died in Inchcleraun
- 1141 Giolla na Naomh Mac Fearghail, chief of the people of Annaly (Angaile), the most prosperous man in Ireland, died at a great age and was buried at Inchcleraun.
- 1150 Morogh, the son of the above, the tower of splendour and nobility in East Connacht died in Inchcleraun.
- 1160 Gilla na Naomh Ó Duinn, ollam of Inchcleraun, teacher of history and poetry sent his spirit to the Supreme Father amidst a choir of angels on the 17th day of December in the year of his 58th birthday.
- 1167 Cinaeth Ua Cethearnaigh, Priest of Inchcleraun died.
- 1168 Dubhcobhlach, the daughter of O'Quinn, wife of Mac Corgamna, died and was interred in Inchcleraun
- 1170 Diarmaid Ó Briain, Coarb of Comman, was chief senior of the east of Connaught, died in Inchcleraun in the 95th year of his age.
- 1174 Rory O'Carroll, Lord of Éile, was slain in the middle of Inchcleraun
- 1189 It was at Inchcleraun on Lough Ree that the hostages of O'Connor Maon-Moy were kept at the time.
- 1193 Inchcleraun was plundered by the sons of Costelloe and by the sons of O'Connor Maon-Moy
- 1232 Tiapraide O' Breen, Coarb of Saint Coman, an ecclesiastic learned in History and Law, died on his pilgrimage on the island of Inchcleraun
- 1244 Donnchad mac Fíngein Ó Conchobhair, who was the grandson of Hugh, son of Torlogh O'Connor, Bishop of Elphin, died 23 April on Inchcleraun, and was interred in the monastery of Boyle.

== Buildings ==
Between 800 and 1300 the island and its churches were repeatedly plundered and burned by invaders, so the buildings are in ruins today. Six of the island's churches are surrounded by an enclosure in the southeast corner of the island.

=== Teampall Diarmada ===
Teampall Diarmada is the monastery founded by Saint Diarmaid the Just (who was a teacher of Ciarán of Clonmacnoise) in 540 AD. This church once had a stone roof.

=== Teampall Mór ===
Teampall Mór stands within four metres to the north of Teampall Diarmada. It consists of a single nave. Its plain masonry walls are in relatively good condition. There are two lancet windows at the east end, which are long, narrow and recessed. The windows on the south side have the appearance of later additions and are unsymmetrical. All traces of doors have vanished, but the opes, which have been arched and protected by the Board of Works, seem to indicate the position of a west door and an entrance on the north side to the cloister. An upper chamber exists.

The interior walls of the church were once plastered. The walls have lost their distinctive features of detail, except for the east window, which is similar in construction to that of the Teampall Clogas. The interior arch of the east window is circular, built of four stones. The exterior has only two stones forming a pointed arch.

There is the remains of an altar, built of rubble work but without the altar slab. The door in the south wall of the nave has a circular moulding. The north door is only a gap.

This church is situated a short distance to the south of the cluster of churches. It is more modern in appearance than any of the others. At the north-west corner is a more modern chamber with no visible entrance. Near this church, half buried with its face downward is a stone bearing incised on its surface a Celtic interlaced cross with an Irish inscription.

=== Templemurry ===
Templemurry is the largest church on the island. According to local lore, any woman who enters Templemurray will die within a year.

=== Teampall Clogas ===
Teampall Clogas is one of the churches, and stands alone at the highest point of the island. It has a square bell tower (Irish: clogas), which is attached to the main building. Most churches of this era had round towers, separate from the main building. It is located on the northern part of the island and is visible from the shoreline. On the plan the church is rectangular, being 10.6 m (35 ft) by 5.1 m (17 ft).
