= Mainchín of Corann =

Mainchín mac Colláin was an Irish saint in Corran who is supposed to have flourished in the late 5th or 6th century.

== Biography ==
Mainchín mac Colláin is commemorated on 13 January in the Martyrology of Tallaght, the Martyrology of Gorman and the Martyrology of Donegal. The Martyrology of Donegal compiled by Mícheál Ó Cléirigh in the 17th century gives a number of details. His father is named Collán, while his mother is said to have been Deidi, daughter of Tren, son of Dubthach, who was chief poet to King Lóegaire mac Néill. This would him give a floruit in the late 5th or 6th century.

Deidi or Dediva (Editua in the Martyrology of Cashel) occurs elsewhere as a mother of saints such as Senán son of Fintan, Caillin (a disciple of Columba), Fedlimid of Kilmore, Daigh son of Carill, Femia, daughter of Carill, and Diarmait of Inis Clothrann.

The Martyrology of Donegal associates the saint with the region of Corran, which John O'Hanlon has preferred to identify as being coterminous with the barony of Corann in Co. Sligo.

In Scottish calendars, the saint appears to have been interpreted as or to have become confused with a female figure of similar name. In the Dunkeld Litany, where her name is Mancinach, she is grouped together with saintly virgins and widows. David Camerarius, in his calendar, calls her Mancina and describes her as a virgin saint who worked miracles in the Hebrides. A woman by the name of Mannsena is also named in the Martyrology of Donegal.
