= Senan of Laraghbrine =

Saint Senan of Laraghbrine (Irish: Laithrech-Briuin), County Kildare, was an Irish Christian monk who lived towards the end of the 6th century. His father was Fintan, son of Strened, son of Glinder, son of Corc, son of Conned, son of Aengus, son of Fieg, son of Mail, son of Carthage of the race of Eochaidh.

Senan's mother's name was Dediva (also called Editua or Dedi or Deidi or Deighe or Deidiu or Deaga), daughter of Tren, son of Dubhthach moccu Lughair, who was Chief Ollam of Ireland and royal poet of King Lóegaire mac Néill.

Senan founded the monastic settlement at Laraghbryan on lands owned by the O'Byrnes. Senan was a contemporary of Columba, and attended the Synod of Drumceat in 580.

Dediva's other children were Saint Mainchín of Corann, son of Collan of Corann, Saint Diamaid the Just, son of Lugna, Saint Caillin, son of Niata, Saint Felim of Kilmore, son of Carill, Saint Daigh of Inniskeen, son of Carill, Saint Femia daughter of Carill and Senchán Torpéist, another Chief Ollam of Ireland. Saint Senan was the oldest of Dediva's famous children.

The Martyrology of Donegal gives his feastday as 2 September.
