= Muirgheas mac Pháidín Ó Maolconaire =

Irish writer and historian

Muirgheas mac Pháidín Ó Maolconaire, Gaelic-Irish scribe, died 1543. He was a native of Cluain Plocáin (now Ballymulconry), parish of Kiltrustan, County Roscommon. It lies close to an inlet of the river Shannon, north of Strokestown.

Ó Maolconaire wrote the Book of Fenagh in 1516/17, at Fenagh Abbey, County Leitrim. He prepared an abbreviated version in 1535, now BL Cotton Vespasian MS E II. He also wrote the vellum manuscript known as Leabhar gabhála, or Leabhar Bhaile Uí Mhaoilchonaire do sgríobh Muirghios mac Paídín Uí Mhaoilchonaire as Liobhar na hUidhre. An incomplete version survives as RIA MS D iv 3

He is sometimes confused with his great-grandson, Muiris mac Torna Ó Maolconaire (died 1645).

== Family tree:An Sliocht Pháidín ==
  Paidín mac Lochlainn meic Maelsechlainn Ó Maolconaire, d. 1506 (a quo Sliocht Pháidín)
  |
  |_______________________________
  |                              |
  |                              |
  Lochlainn                      Muirgheas mac Pháidín Ó Maolconaire, d. 1543. 
  |                              |
  |                              |_____________ 
  Séan Ruadh, d. 1589.           |           |
  |                              |           |
  |                              Eóluis      ?________________
  Lochlainn                      |           |              | 
  |                              |           |              |
  |                              Torna       Moileachlain   Fláithrí, Archbishop of Tuam, 1560–1629
  Fearfeasa Ó Maol Chonaire  |
                                 |  
                                 Muiris, d. 1645.

== Sources ==
- Muirgheas Ó Maolconaire of Cluain Plocáin: an early sixteenth-century Connacht scribe at work, Bernadette Cunningham and Raymond Gillespie, Studia Hibernica 35 (2008–09), pp. 17–43.
- Muiris Ó Maolconaire, in Dictionary of Irish biography (9 vols, Cambridge, 2009)
- The Annals of the Four Masters: Irish history, kingship and society in the early seventeenth century, p. 55, 91, 257, 262-3, Bernadette Cunningham, Four Courts Press, 2010. ISBN 978-1-84682-203-2.
