= Oran of Iona =

6th-century Irish Christian saint

Saint Oran
- Born: County Meath, Ireland
- Died: Iona, Scotland
- Venerated in: Catholic Church, Orthodox Church, Anglican Church and other Churches
- Feast: 27 October
- Patronage: Waterford, Ireland; Silvermines parish, Tipperary, atheists

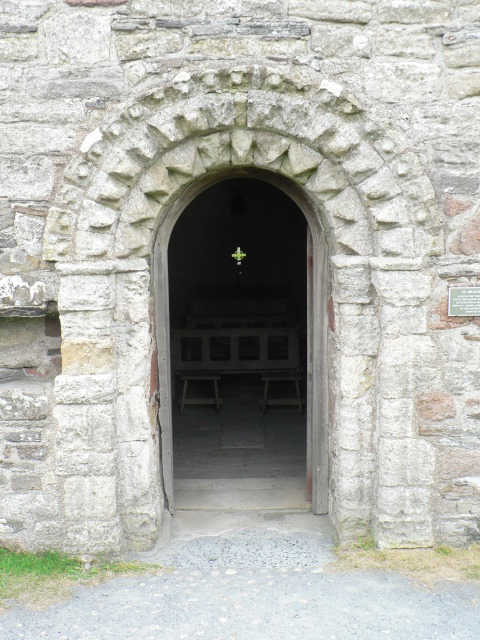
St. Oran's Chapel, Iona

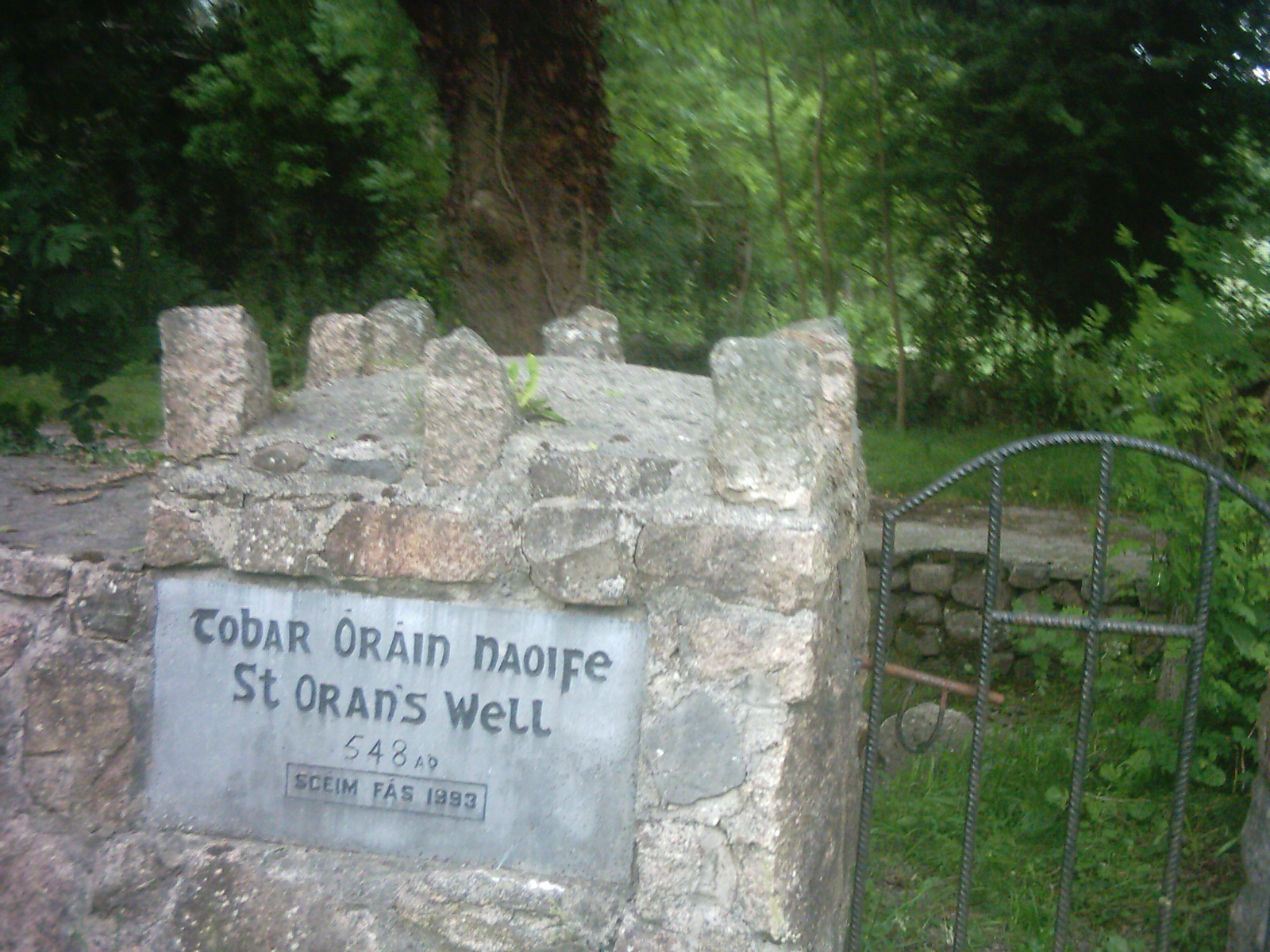
St Oran's Well, Oranmore, County Galway. It bears the date of AD 548 based on a presumed connection to Oran; however, the placename is more likely derived from fuarán, "spring", with no connection to Oran.

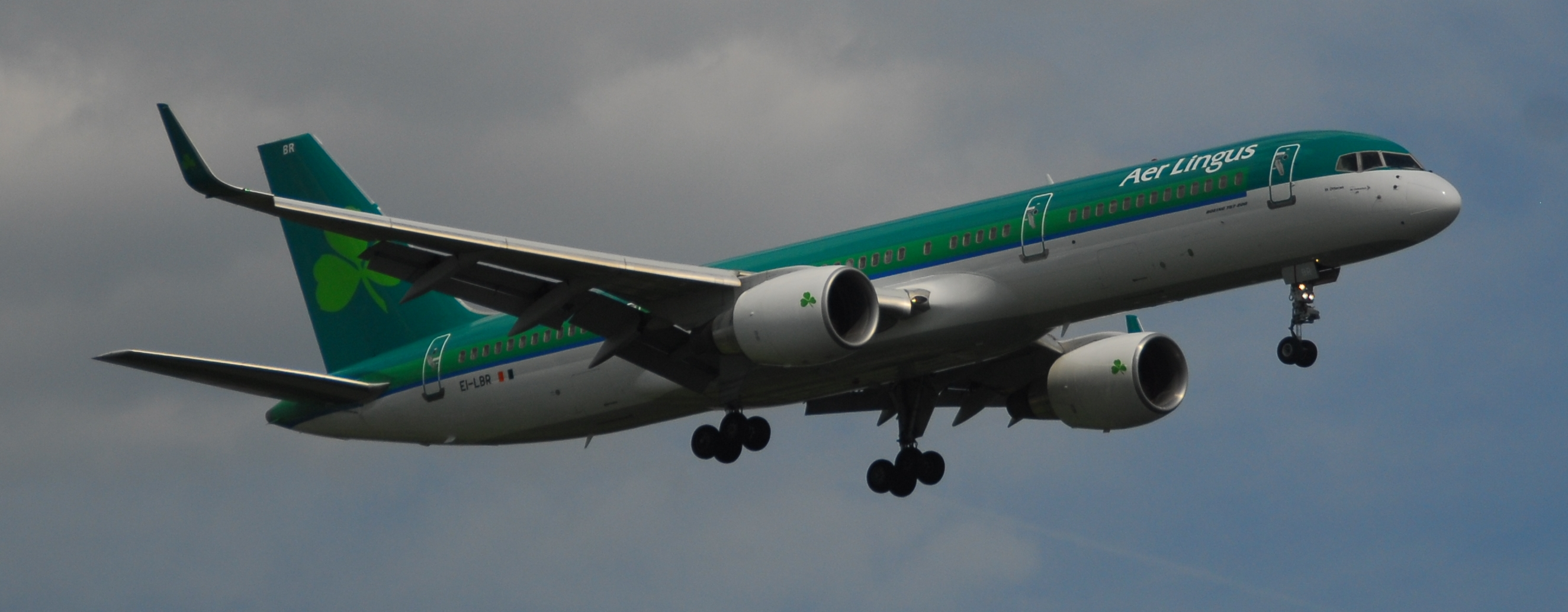
An Aer Lingus Boeing 757 named St Otteran-Odhrán.

Oran or Odran (Old Irish: Odrán, Irish: Odhrán; Latin: Otteranus, hence sometimes Otteran; died AD 548), by tradition a descendant of Conall Gulban, was a companion of Saint Columba in Iona, and the first Christian to be buried on that island. Saint Odhrán's feast day is on 27 October.

== Life ==
Odran lived for over forty years in the area now known as Silvermines, in County Tipperary, Ireland, building a church there in 520. According to Irish tradition, Odran also served as abbot of Meath, and founded Lattreagh. In 563, he was among the twelve who accompanied Columba to the Scottish island of Iona, where he died and was buried. Columba is said to have seen devils and angels fight over Odran's soul before it ascended into heaven.

One popular legend surrounding Odran's death is that he consented to being buried alive beneath a chapel that Columba was attempting to build at Iona. A voice had told Columba that the walls of the chapel would not stand until a living man was buried below the foundations, and indeed, each morning the builders would arrive at the site to find all their work of the previous day undone. So Odran was consigned to the earth, and the chapel was erected above him. One day, however, Odran lifted his head out of the ground and said: "There is no Hell as you suppose, nor Heaven that people talk about". Alarmed by this, Columba quickly had the body removed and reburied in consecrated ground – or, in other versions of the story, simply called for more earth to cover the body.

In a Hebridean version of this tale, Odran was promised that his soul would be safe in heaven. Sometime after the burial, Columba wanted to see Odran once more and opened the pit under the chapel. When Odran saw the world, he tried to climb out of his grave, but Columba had the pit covered with earth quickly to save Odran's soul from the world and its sin.

These legends are one of the few instances of foundation sacrifice in Great Britain. While the story of Odran's self-sacrifice does not appear in Adomnán's Life of Columcille, George Henderson says that the legend points to an ancient folk-belief. He believes this is similar to the Arthurian legend of the building of Dinas Emris, where Vortigern was counselled to find and sacrifice "a child without a father" to ensure that the fortress walls did not collapse.

Due to the similarity of the name, some people have identified Odran with Saint Odran, the first Irish Christian martyr. There is a parallel in that each man voluntarily sacrificed himself to further the work of a better-known saint.

== Legacy ==
The oldest remaining church on Iona is dedicated to Saint Odran. The surrounding cemetery is called Reilig Odhráin in his memory.

Odran is the patron saint of the parish of Silvermines, County Tipperary. He was chosen by the Vikings as patron of the city of Waterford in 1096 and later chosen as patron of the diocese.

== In culture ==
Neil Gaiman's poem "In Relig Odhrain", published in Trigger Warning: Short Fictions and Disturbances (2015), retells the story of Oran's death. Gaiman later provided the narration for the 2019 animated short "The Grave of St. Oran," based on Gaiman's poem and directed by Jim Batt.

New Zealand singer-songwriter Stephen McDonald's song "Oran" on the CD Stone of Destiny relates the tale of Oran and his demise.
