= Femia =

Saint Femia (also spelt Femme, Feme, and Eufemia; fl. 6th century) was an Irish Christian saint, a sister of Saint Felim of Kilmore and Saint Daig of Inniskeen.

== Biography ==
Femia lived towards the end of the 6th century. Her father was Carill, son of Laisrén, son of Dallán, son of Eógan mac Néill, son of Niall of the Nine Hostages, son of Eochaid Mugmedón.

Femia's mother's name was Dediva (also called Editua, Dedi, Deidi, Deighe, Deidiu, Deaga or Mediva), daughter of Tren, son of Dubhthach moccu Lughair, who was Chief Ollam of Ireland and royal poet of King Lóegaire mac Néill. Dediva's other children were Saint Senan of Laraghabrine, son of Fintan; Saint Diarmaid the Just, son of Lugna; Saint Caillin, son of Niata; Saint Felim of Kilmore, who was another son of Carill and Femia's full brother; Saint Daigh of Inniskeen, who was another son of Carill and Femia's full brother; St.Mainchín of Corann, son of Collan of Corann; and Senchán Torpéist, another Chief Ollam of Ireland.

The Martyrology of Tallaght describes her as "Femme, beautiful, ample, safe, Cairell’s dear modest daughter". The Martyrology of Donegal gives her feast day as 17 September.
