= Baunogenasraid =

Neolithic burial site in Carlow, Ireland

- Bánóg na Sráide (Irish)
- Location within Ireland
- 52.8124°N 6.8237°W
- Type: Linkardstown tomb
- Periods: Neolithic
- Location: Baunogenasraid, Grangeford, County Carlow, Ireland

Designations
- Designation: National Monument

National monument of Ireland
- Official name: Baunogenasraid
- Reference no.: 566

Baunogenasraid is an archaeological site and National Monument in County Carlow. The site was excavated in 1972 and discovered to contain a single neolithic burial mound which was expanded into a small cemetery in the early Bronze Age.

== Location ==
Baunogenasraid is located north of the Burren River.
