= Euhel =

Irish saint

Euhel was a 5th-century Irish saint who lived about 460 AD.

== Biography ==
His father was Dubhthach moccu Lughair, the Chief Ollam of Ireland. Gabhran's brothers were all saints and founders of churches, mainly in Leinster. They included Fachtna of Kiltoom, Trian, Saint Gabhran, Moninne, Lonan and Molaisi.

Euhel was a student of Finbarr of Cork at Loch-Erce.

The Martyrology of Donegal gives Euhel's feast-day as 14 November as follows- “The three sons of Dubhthach, i.e., Fachtna of Cill-Toma, Gabhran and Euhel, the other two.”

The Martyrology of Gorman (Félire Uí Gormáin), for the same day gives- “Dear are the pure-formed, three godly sons of Dubthach”.

== Sources ==
- Loca Patriciana. No. V. The Druids, Dubhtach Mac Ui Lugair and His Sons, Rev John Francis Shearman - The Journal of the Royal Historical and Archaeological Association of Ireland, 1874.
- 'The Martyrology of Donegal' ed. John O'Donovan, 1864.
- 'The Martyrology of Gorman' ed. Whitley Stokes, 1895.
- Pádraig Ó Riain, Corpus genealogiarum sanctorum Hiberniae. Dublin, 1985, Section 670.72
