= Nurney Cross =

- Cros na hUrnaí (Irish)
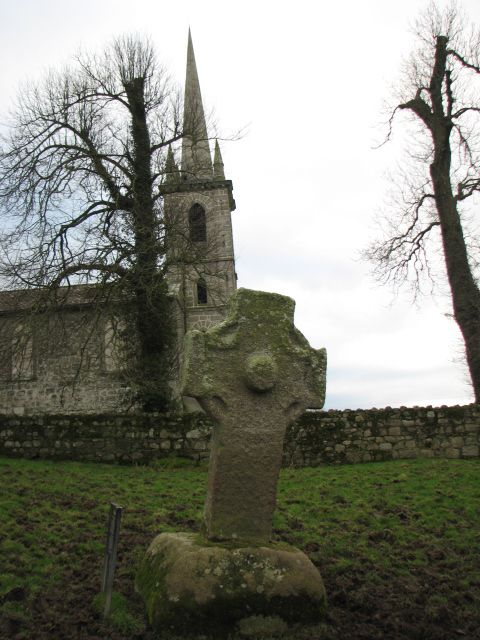
- The second, more recent cross at Nurney.

- Location within Ireland
- 52.7518°N 6.9123°W
- Location: Nurney, County Carlow, Ireland

History
- Built: 5th/6th century

National monument of Ireland
- Official name: Nurney
- Reference no.: 352

Nurney Cross is a stone cross located in Nurney, County Carlow, Ireland, and is an early example of a high cross.

The site was a monastic site founded by Abbán in the 5th century AD and the cross is believed to date from that time.

== Description ==
The cross is a circle-headed cross embedded in the ground near St. John's Church of Ireland, Nurney.

A second cross nearby stands 1.7 metres (5.6 ft) high and is about 1.2 metres (3.9 ft) wide at the arms and 30 centimetres (0.98 ft) thick.
