= Saint Felim =

Irish Christian hermit and priest (born c. 500)

Saint Felim (also called Feilim, Feidlimid, Feidhlimidh, Felimy, Feidhilmethie, Feidlimthe, Fedlimid, Fedlimidh, Phelim, Phelime), an Irish Christian hermit and priest, was born, probably in Kiennacta Breagh, County Meath in the mid sixth century.

== Life ==
Felim was born shortly after 500 AD. His father was Carill, son of Laisrén, son of Dallán, son of Eógan mac Néill, son of Niall of the Nine Hostages, son of Eochaid Mugmedón.

His mother was Dediva (also called Editua or Dedi or Deidi or Deighe or Deidiu or Deaga or Mediva), daughter of Tren, son of Dubhthach moccu Lughair, who was a Chief Ollam of Ireland and royal poet of King Lóegaire mac Néill. Dediva's other children were Saint Senan of Laraghbrine, son of Fintan, Saint Caillin of Fenagh, son of Niata, St.Mainchín of Corann, son of Collan of Corann, Saint Daigh of Inniskeen, who was another son of Carill and Saint Felim's younger full brother, Saint Femia who was a daughter of Carill and Saint Felim's full sister, Saint Diarmaid the Just, son of Lugna and Senchán Torpéist, a later Chief Ollam of Ireland.

The tradition that he was a monk in the monastery in Slanore near Crossdoney is well founded and attested. He is the first known Bishop of Kilmore, and patron saint of the Kilmore diocese. Felim became a hermit living near Kilmore, County Cavan, where he later founded a monastery (Cill Mór /Big Church).

According to the Martyrology of Tallaght and the Martyrology of Donegal, his feastday is 3 August but the other Calendars give it as 9 August which is celebrated as his feastday in present day. The discrepancy arises because 3 August was the start date of the annual pattern or fair devoted to the saint in Kilmore, which lasted a week from 3 to 9 August. The Ulster Plantation papers of 1608 give a list of fairs in county Cavan which includes- "One fayre holden att Killmore yearly the third day of August being Saint Phelime's Day".

According to local tradition, the Church of Ireland St Fethlimidh's Cathedral, Kilmore, is built on the site where Felim originally built his church. The Roman Catholic Cathedral of Saint Patrick and Saint Felim is located in Cavan.
