= St. Senach =

Irish priest and saint

Senach Uí Chormaic of Cillmór was an Irish priest and one of the six brothers of St. Abbán moccu Corbmaic (died 520?). His mother was Broinsech Breac, who was sister of Iubhar who was son of Lughna. His feast day was November 2.

He should not be confused with Senach Bishop of Armagh.
