= Diarmaid the Just =

Saint Diarmaid the Just (also known as Diermit, Dhiarmuit, Dermod, Diermedus, Diermetus, Diermitius, Diermitius) was a Catholic abbot of Inis Clothrann (Inchcleraun), Lough Ree, County Longford and of Faughalstown, County Westmeath and a famous Irish confessor of the late-sixth century.

== Life ==
He was of princely origin as he was seventh in descent from Nath Í, King of Ireland, who died in 428, and a member of the Hy-Fiachrach family from Connacht. His father was Lugna, son of Lugad, son of Finbarr, son of Fraic, son of Cathchuon, son of Aengus Becchuoun, son of Nath Í son of Fiachrae. His mother was Dediva (also called Editua or Dedi or Deidi or Deighe or Deidiu or Deaga), daughter of Tren, son of Dubhthach moccu Lughair, who was a Chief Ollam of Ireland and royal poet of King Lóegaire mac Néill. Dediva's other children were Saint Senan of Laraghabrine, son of Fintan, Saint Caillin of Fenagh, son of Niata, St.Mainchín of Corann, son of Collan of Corann, Saint Felim of Kilmore son of Carill, Saint Daigh of Inniskeen son of Carill, Saint Femia daughter of Carill and Senchán Torpéist, a later Chief Ollam of Ireland. Saint Diarmaid was the youngest of Dediva's famous children.

About the year 530, he founded the great monastery of Inchcleraun on Lough Ree, in the Diocese of Ardagh. Wishing to found an oratory far from the day-to-day distractions of civilization, he selected the isolated island associated with the memory of Queen Medbh, Inchcleraun. On this island, according to some versions of the Death of Medb, she is slain by her nephew Furbaide Ferbend, also known by the name Diarmaid.

Here his fame soon attracted disciples, among them Ciaran of Clonmacnoise. He was a good teacher and also a distinguished writer and poet. On the island seven churches are traditionally said to have been erected, and the traces of six are still in evidence, including Teampul Diarmada, or the church of St. Diarmiad. This oratory, eight feet by seven feet in size, is said to have been Diarmaid's own church.

The monastic school he founded kept up its reputation for fully six centuries after his death, and the island itself was famous for pilgrimages in pre-Reformation days. An ivory statue of the saint was removed from the island during the Reformation to avoid destruction. Diarmaid also founded the monastery of Caille-Fochladha, Lough Derryvaragh, Co. Westmeath, where there is a holy well dedicated to him.

St. Diarmaid's nickname was 'Diarmaid the Just'; he is sometimes confused with an earlier St. Justus who was both baptiser and teacher of St. Ciaran. He was a friend of St. Senan, Abbot of Iniscathy and he composed metrical psalters, among which is "Cealtair Dichill".

He died on 10 January at Inchcleraun and his feast is celebrated on that date.
