= Fachtna of Kiltoom =

Fachtna of Kiltoom (Gaelic = Cill Toma) in the barony of Fore, County Westmeath was an Irish Christian saint who lived about 460. His father was Dubhthach moccu Lughair, the Chief Ollam of Ireland.

Fachtna's brothers were all saints and founders of churches, mainly in Leinster. They included Trian, Saint Gabhran, Saint Euhel, Saint Molaisse Mac Lugair, Moninne and Lonan.

The Martyrology of Donegal gives Fachtna's feast-day as 14 November as follows- “The three sons of Dubhthach, i.e., Fachtna of Cill-Toma, Gabhran and Euhel, the other two.”

The Martyrology of Gorman (Félire Uí Gormáin), for the same day gives- “Dear are the pure-formed, three godly sons of Dubthach”.
