= Lorum High Cross =

National monument of Ireland

- Ardchros Leamhdhroma (Irish)
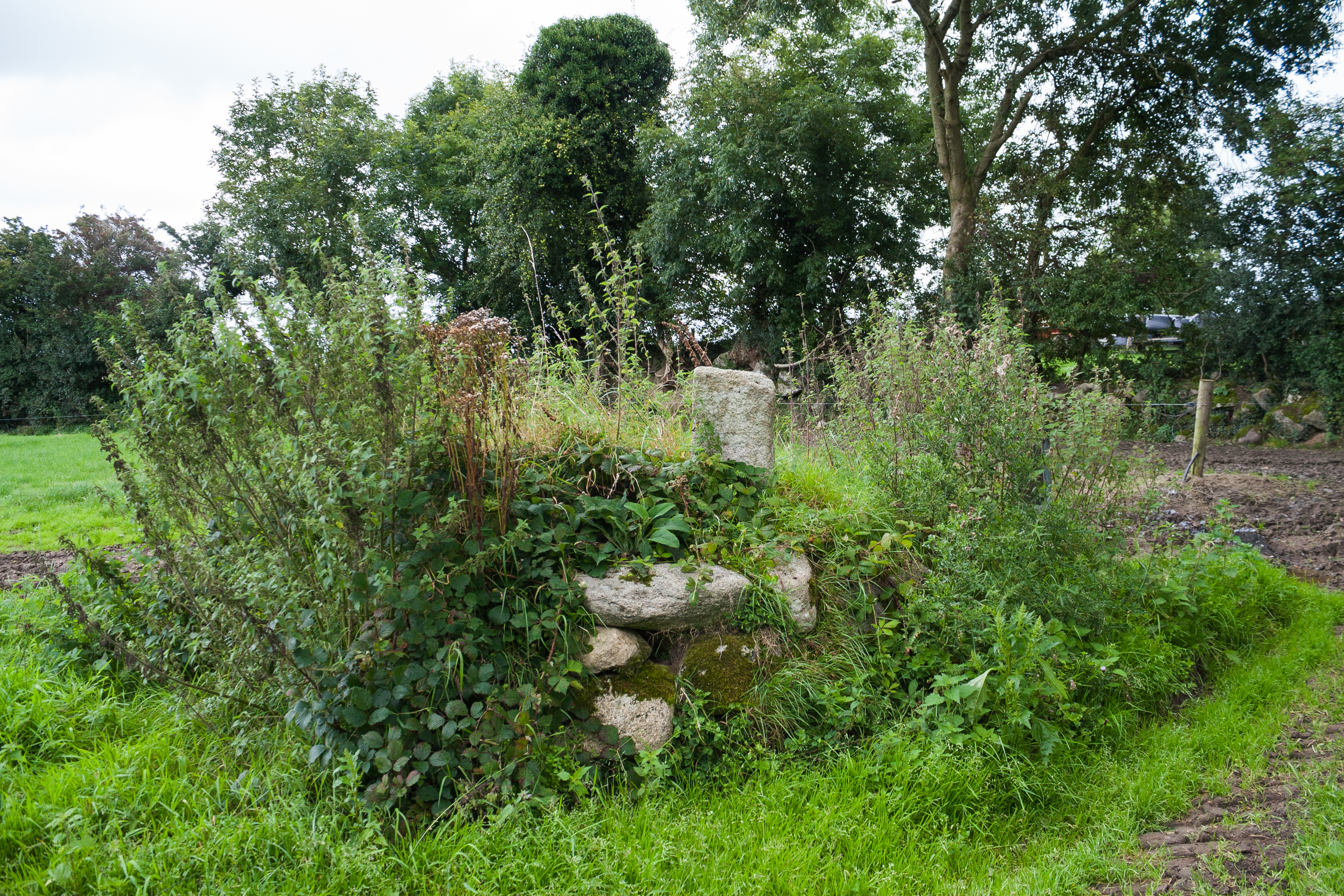
- Surviving granite shaft of the cross

- Location within Ireland
- 52°39′50″N 6°55′56″W
- Location: Lorum, Ballinkillin, County Carlow, Ireland

National monument of Ireland
- Official name: Lorum
- Reference no.: 350

Lorum High Cross is a high cross fragment and National Monument located in Lorum, County Carlow, Ireland The cross belongs to an early monastic site which is associated with Molaise of Leighlin. The remaining cross fragment consists of a granite shaft with a height of 55 cm and a width of 30 cm that resides on a small cairn with a diameter of 210 cm.
