= Kilgallon =

Kilgallon is the name of several people:

- Matthew Kilgallon (born 1984), English footballer
- T. J. Kilgallon (born 1961), Irish Gaelic footballer

== See also ==
- Kilgallen, a surname
