= Saint Gabhran =

Irish saint

Saint Gabhran was a 5th-century Irish saint.

== Biography ==
Gabhran was an Irish Christian saint who lived about 460 AD. His father was Dubthach maccu Lughair, the Chief Ollam of Ireland. Gabhran's brothers were all saints and founders of churches, mainly in Leinster. They included Fachtna of Kiltoom, Trian, Saint Euhel, Moninne, Lonan and Saint Molaisse Mac Lugair.

The Martyrology of Donegal gives Gabhran's feast-day as 14 November as follows- “The three sons of Dubhthach, i.e., Fachtna of Cill-Toma, Gabhran and Euhel, the other two.”

The Martyrology of Gorman (Félire Uí Gormáin), for the same day gives- “Dear are the pure-formed, three godly sons of Dubthach”.
