= Kilgallen =

Kilgallen is a surname. Notable people with the surname include:

- Diarmuid Kilgallen (born 2000), Irish rugby union player
- Dorothy Kilgallen (1913–1965), American journalist and television game show panelist
- Margaret Kilgallen (1967–2001), American artist

== See also ==
- Kilgallon
