= Manchin =

Manchin is the surname of a prominent American political family in West Virginia. It is an anglicized form of the Italian surname Mancini.

- A. James Manchin (1927–2003), American politician
- Mark Manchin (born 1952), American educator and politician, son of A. James
- Joe Manchin (born 1947), American politician, nephew of A. James
- Gayle Conelly Manchin (born 1947), American educator, wife of Joe
- Tim Manchin (born 1955), American politician, nephew of A. James, cousin of Joe

== See also ==
- Mancini
- Mainchín
