= Abbán =

Irish saint and abbot

Saint Abbán Eibbán Moabba
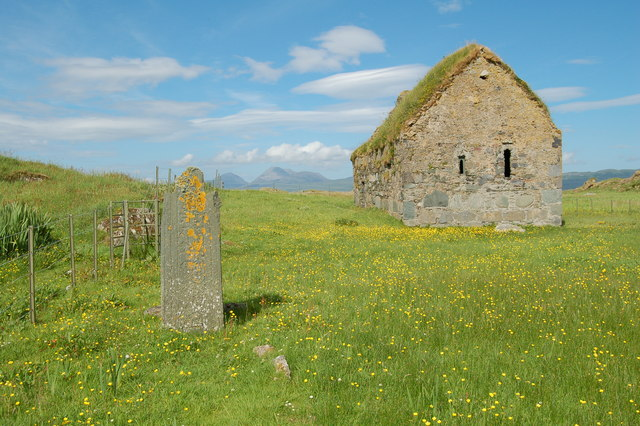
- Chapel of St Cormac, chapel at Eilean Mòr, Jura, in the MacCormaig Isles (Scotland). Like the Church of Keills (Kilvickocharmick) on the Scottish mainland, it may be associated with Abbán.

Abbot
- Died: 520?
- Venerated in: Roman Catholic Church; Eastern Orthodox Church
- Feast: 27 October Some sources also cite 13 May.
- Patronage: Mag Arnaide (Adamstown, County Wexford), Cell Abbáin (Killabban, County Laois), etc.

Abbán of Corbmaic (Old Irish: Abbán moccu Corbmaic, Latin: Abbanus; d. 520?), also Eibbán or Moabba, was a saint and abbot. He is associated, first and foremost, with the Mag Arnaide (Moyarney or Adamstown, County Wexford, near New Ross). His order was, however, also connected to other churches elsewhere in Ireland, notably that of his alleged sister Gobnait.

== Sources ==
Three recensions of Abbán's Life survive, two in Latin and one in Irish. The Latin versions are found in the Codex Dublinensis and the Codex Salmanticensis, while the Irish version is preserved incomplete in two manuscripts: the Mícheál Ó Cléirigh's manuscript Brussels, Royal Library MS 2324–40, fos. 145b-150b and also the RIA, Stowe MS A 4, pp. 205–21. These Lives probably go back to a Latin exemplar written in ca. 1218 by the bishop of Ferns, Albin O'Molloy, who died in 1223. His interest in Abbán partly stemmed from the fact that Mag Arnaide lay within the diocese of Ferns, but as this was only a minor church in his time, more must have been involved. An episode which shows something of O'Molloy's personal attachment to Abbán's order is that where Abbán arrives in the area between Éile and Fir Chell, i.e. on the marches between Munster and Leinster: Abbán converts a man of royal rank from the area and baptises his son. O'Molloy is known to have been a native of this area, but his own commentary as apparently preserved in the Dublin Life identifies the connection more nearly: "I who gathered together and wrote the Life am a descendant [nepos] of that son" However, the immediate circumstances which prompted the composition of the Life are likely to have been political, relating to the Norman presence in the diocese of Ferns. To support his case, O'Molloy made much of Abbán's wider connections to other churches and saints, making him travel all across the country and in the case of the anecdote about Abingdon (see below), even inventing tradition.

Other sources for Abbán's life and order include the Irish genealogies of the saints and the entries for his feast day in the martyrologies. His pedigree is given in the Book of Leinster, Leabhar Breac, Rawlinson B 502 and in glosses to his entries in the Félire Óengusso.

== Background and life ==
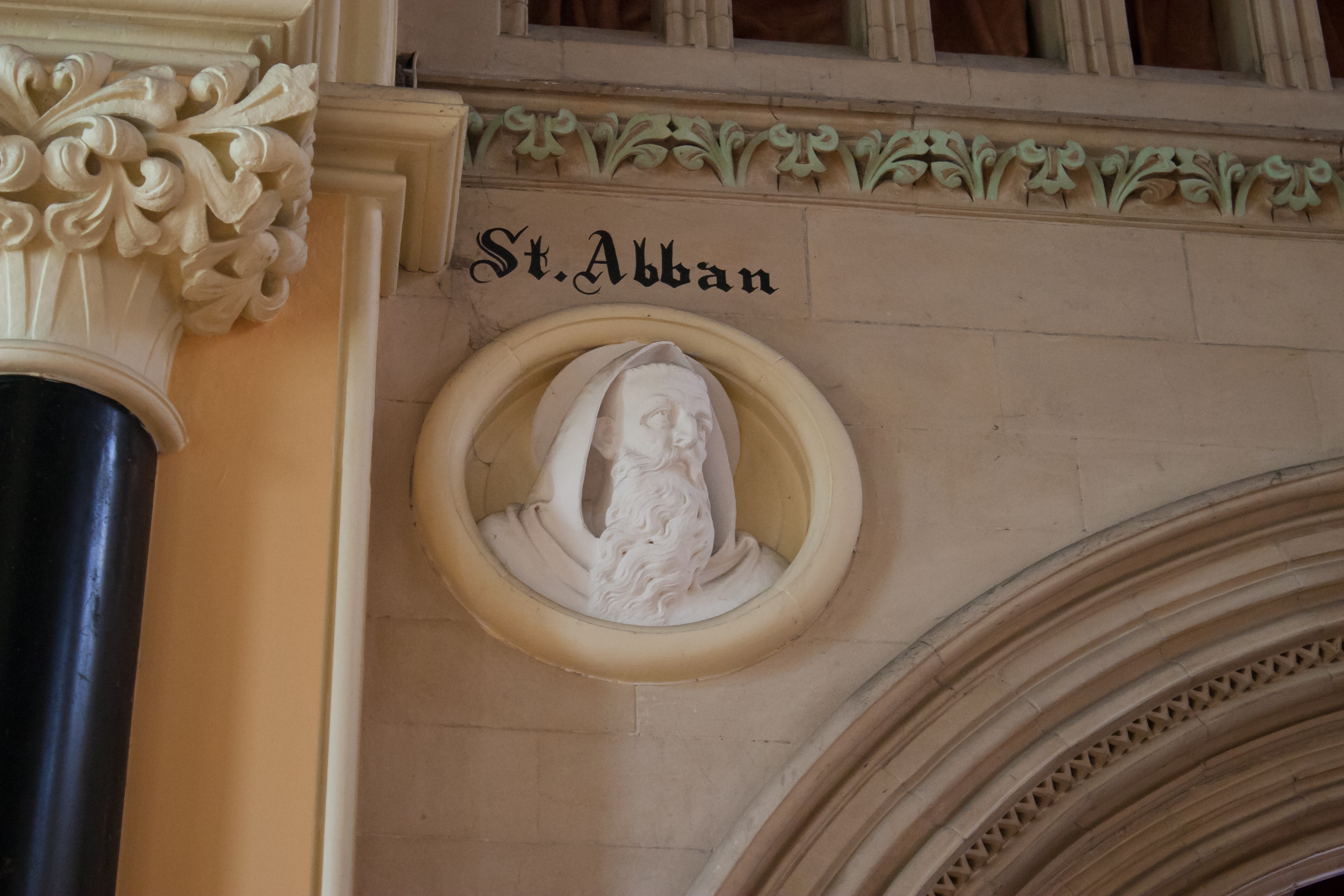
Relief of St. Abban, Church of SS. Mary and Michael, New Ross

His pedigree in the Irish genealogies, which appear to have been composed in the interest of Cell Abbáin, suggests that he belonged to the Uí Chormaic (also Moccu Chormaic or Dál Chormaic). It identifies his father as Laignech (lit. "Leinsterman"), son of Mac Cainnech, son of Cabraid, son of Cormac, son of Cú Corb, while an Irish note to the Félire Óengusso (for 27 October) largely agrees if substituting Cabraid for Imchad. The Lives, on the other hand, states that his father was Cormac son of Ailill, king of Leinster, who died in 435 according to the Annals of the Four Masters, and name his mother Mílla, sister to St Ibar.

The Lives confuse the time of Abbán's historical floruit by attributing to him a life span of over 300 years. He is brought into contact with such illustrious saints as Finnian of Clonard, Brendan of Clonfert (d. 577), Columba (d. 597), Gregory the Great, Munnu and Moling. One of Abbán's foundations is said to have been repeatedly pillaged by Cormac mac Diarmata (fl. 2nd half of the 6th century), king of Leinster from the Uí Bairrche, who is portrayed in much Leinster hagiography as a rival to the Uí Chennselaig. Abbán is also made a contemporary of even earlier figures like Íbar, who is claimed to be his maternal uncle, and Saint Patrick.

=== Family and early life ===
Nothing is known of Abbán's early life. The Lives tell that he was expected to succeed his father in Leinster, but that his devotion to God and the saintly miracles which he wrought while still in foster care soon made clear that he was destined for a career in the church. The boy was sent to his maternal uncle, the bishop Íbar, with whom he travelled to Rome.

Abbán had six brothers who all appear in the Martyrology of Donegal as bishops: Damán Uí Chormaic of Tígh Damhain (Tidowan), in the barony of Marybouragh, County Laois; Miacca Uí Cormaic of Cluain Fodhla in Fiodhmar (borders Uí Duach/Bally Fíodhmor, Ossory); Senach Uí Chormaic of Cillmór; Lithghean Uí Chormaic of Cluain Mór Lethghian in Uí Failge (Barony Ophaly, Co. Kildare); Dubhán Uí Chormaic; Toimdeach Uí Chormaic of Rosglas, Monasterevin, County Kildare.

Dár Cairthaind and Ethne are listed as his sisters in the 'Accent of the Saints', while Gobnait of Baile Bhuirne, Cork and Craobh Dearg are mentioned as his sisters in other accounts.

=== Miracles ===
According to the Lives, Abbán wrought miracles to aid his journey to Italy. Once there, Abbán's saintly powers proved to be of much use in warding off any danger presented by men, monsters and supernatural phenomena. Throughout the text, Abbán can be seen demonstrating his powers, exercising special authority over rivers and seas.

In one notable use of his power over water, Abbán later baptized the daughter of an old nobleman who desired a son, and miraculously changed the child's gender to male. This delighted the local nobility and resulted in the son becoming king later. This change in gender is one of the most uncommon types of miracles attributed to Irish saints, with only Saint Gerald of Mayo being recorded as performing a similar miracle.

The Lives say that later in life, Abbán saved a boy from a river, calmed wolves to save cattle, and kept snow from ruining a Bible left outside.

== Foundations ==
The glosses to the two entries for Abbán in the Félire Óengusso associate him with Mag Arnaide (County Wexford), in the territory of the Uí Chennselaig (also Uí Buide), and with Cell Abbáin (County Laois), in the territory of the Uí Muiredaig.

However, Abbán's activities were also linked to many other parts of Ireland. Of special note is the tradition that Saint Gobnait was his sister and that his grave was to be found near her church or nunnery in Bairnech, now Ballyvourney (Muskerry, County Cork). As the later recensions suggest, Ailbe's original Life seems to build on this connection by claiming that Abbán founded Ballyvourney and gave it to his sister.

According to his Lives, he began to found a string of churches after returning from a second visit to Rome. Other churches said to have been founded by him include Cell Ailbe (Co. Meath) and Camross (Co. Laois), as well as a monastery at Nurney, County Carlow of which an early high cross survives.

The Bollandists argued that the Abbán of Mag Arnaide and the Abbán of Cell Abbáin were originally two distinct saints, one commemorated on 16 March, the other on 27 October, but that the two were conflated from an early period. This conclusion, however, has been rejected by scholars like W.W. Heist and Charles Plummer.

There is also a brief biographical reference to Abbán in the official hagiographical compilation of the Eastern Orthodox Church, The Great Synaxaristes for 13 May. This source states that he was baptised in 165 AD, became a missionary in the Abingdon area of England, and reposed in peace.

== Abingdon and Irish-Norman relations ==
The Life puts forward the spurious claim that Abingdon, the town near Oxford, is to be explained etymologically as Abbain dun, "Abbán's town". The aetiological tale goes that the town took its name from Abbán because he had successfully converted the king and the people of the area. The story was not an isolated one. The etymology is also brought up by the author who revised the 12th-century chronicle of the house, Historia Ecclesie Abbendonensis ("The History of the Church of Abingdon"). As Abingdon Abbey lay in a valley, he prefers the Irish derivation: "For we have learnt from our contemporaries that, according to the language of the Irish, Abingdon is interpreted 'house of Aben'; but according to the language of the English, Abingdon commonly means 'the hill of Aben'."

Pádraig Ó Riain proposes that the episode in Abbán's Life was intended to offer some counterweight against English propaganda which asserted that the need for religious and ecclesiastical guidance justified English presence in Ireland; and that, in fact, the linguistic convenience was what made Abbán of an otherwise minor church such a suitable protagonist. More specifically, Ailbe may have written his Life in response to his quarrel with William, Earl Marshall, who had seized two manors near New Ross, and Normans rather than Irishmen may have been his target audience. It has been argued that the formative occasion for the story was a visit to Abingdon made in 1080 by Lorcán Ua Tuathail (Lawrence O'Toole), Archbishop of Dublin, who stayed there for three weeks before accompanying Henry II to Normandy. Ailbe, being one of the archbishop's disciples, may have been present.

== Commemoration ==
In the Martyrology of Tallaght, the Félire Óengusso and the Martyrology of Gorman, Abbán has two feast days: 16 March and 27 October, which is identified in the Lives as his death-date. John Colgan and Ó Cléirigh's Martyrology of Donegal only mention Abbán for 16 March. Other sources cite 13 May.

His entries in the Félire Óengusso praise him as an "angelic bush of gold" (doss óir ainglech) and "an abbot fair and train-having" (abb cain clíarach).

== See also ==
- List of Catholic saints
- List of Eastern Orthodox saints
