= Straboe Grave Slab =

Medieval artifact in County Carlow, Ireland

- Leac Uaighe Shrúbh Bó (Irish)
- Location within Ireland
- 52°51′41″N 6°46′19″W
- Location: Straboe, Killerig, County Carlow, Ireland

History
- Built: 8th century

National monument of Ireland
- Official name: Straboe
- Reference no.: 452

The Straboe Grave Slab is a medieval grave slab located in Straboe, County Carlow, Ireland. It is protected under the National Monuments Acts (1930–2014).

== Location ==
The grave slab is located outside the ruined Templeboy church, approximately 6 km (4 mi) southeast of Castledermot, and 1.5 km (1 mile) north of the River Slaney. A holy well, castle, ringfort and spring are also located nearby.

== Description ==
The grave slab measures 1.8 m × 0.4 m × 0.2 m (5 ft 11 in × 1 ft 4 in × 8 in). There is a Latin cross at the wider end and a Maltese cross inscribed at the narrower end. The ends are V-shaped. Its shape is similar to the De Profundis Stone in Kilbride, County Westmeath.
