= Killoughternane Church =

Ruined church in County Carlow, Ireland

- The White Church
- Cill Fhoirtchearnáin
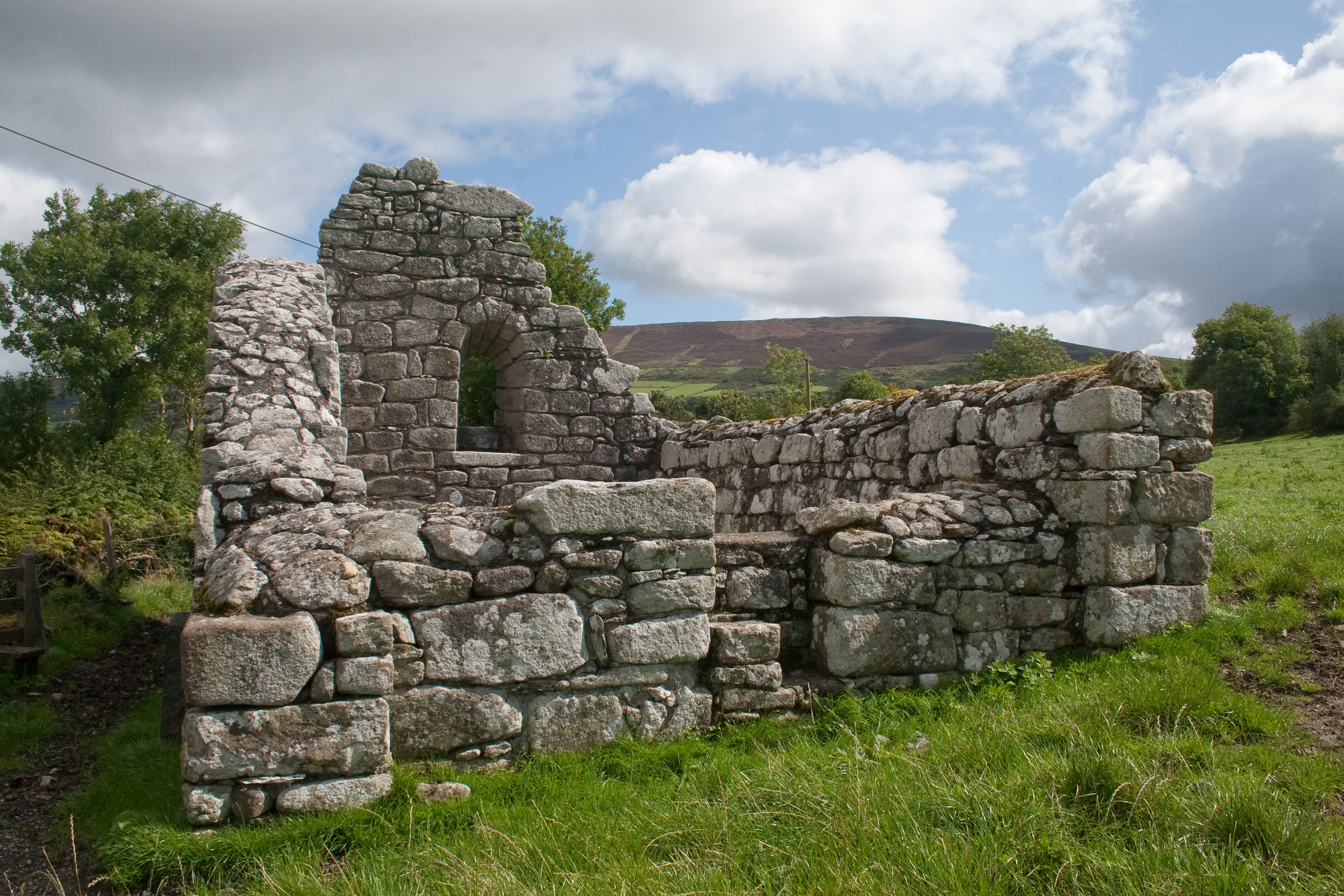

- Location within Ireland
- 52°38′02″N 6°51′13″W
- Location: Killoughternane, Borris, County Carlow, Ireland
- Country: Ireland
- Denomination: Pre-Reformation Catholic

History
- Founded: 10th century AD
- Founder: Saint Fortcheirn

Architecture
- Functional status: In ruins
- Heritage designation: National Monument
- Style: Celtic

Specifications
- Length: 5.5 metres (18 ft)
- Width: 3.5 metres (11 ft)
- Materials: granite

Administration
- Diocese: Kildare and Leighlin
- Parish: Myshall and Drumphea

National monument of Ireland
- Official name: Killoughternane
- Reference no.: 393

Killoughternane Church is a 10th-century Celtic Christian church located in County Carlow, Ireland. It was built on the remains of a timber church said to have been built by Fortiarnán (Fortchern, Fortcheirn) in the 5th century AD.

== Location ==
Killoughternane Church is located in southern County Carlow, northwest of Mount Leinster and about 6 km northeast of Borris.

== History and archaeology ==
St Fortichern, a bishop, one of the smiths of St Patrick and teacher of St Finnian of Clonard, founded a monastery on this site in the 5th Century. The monastery became a site noted for its learning for a millennium after its founding. The only visible sign remaining of this are the ruins of the oratory built in the 10th century. However, an archaeological survey in 2001 found traces of monastic buildings beneath the road. These were a chapel and three support buildings which were constructed from wood, had thatched roofs and walls made of clay or wattle. This site was on either side of the road and centred around Killoughternane Cross. The survey also found indications that before the building of the now ruined oratory it was the site of an earlier 8th century timber-framed church which was the same length as the ruined oratory but was considerably wider. They also discovered a Neolithic burial beneath the oratory. The survey found that there was as many as 25 buildings on the site at Killoughternane. The monastery had a round tower which was located to the north west of the Oratory's eastern wall at a distance of about 20 yards, it had a height of 96 feet (29 m) and was destroyed in the 13th century after it was struck by lightning. The monastery was expanded in the Middle Ages when a large church was built of stone with a wood shingle roof was constructed along with an infirmary, a dormitory and classrooms. In the 14th century the final buildings were added, again of stone, and these were a lecture hall, a washroom and a residence.

== The building ==
The church is made of local hammer-dressed granite, with walls 80 cm (31 in) thick. A baptismal font is in one corner, and there are antae on either side. Archaeological work showed evidence of a Neolithic burial ground.

=== St. Fortcheirn's Well ===
A holy well and altar stand across the road. Formerly pilgrims came from County Wexford across the Blackstairs Mountains seeking miraculous cures. In the 19th century a chalice (called the Braganza Chalice, after the bishop's house in Carlow) and paten, both of silver inlaid with gold, were found hidden in the well. The chalice bore an inscription dating to 1595 and is believed to have been hidden during the Penal era when Irish Catholicism was repressed. Both are held at the parochial house in Muine Bheag.
