= Dubthach maccu Lugair =

Irish poet and lawyer

Dubthach Maccu Lugair
- Occupation: Poet
- Known for: Association with St Patrick

Dubthach maccu Lugair (fl. fifth century), is a legendary Irish poet and lawyer who supposedly lived at the time of St Patrick's mission in Ireland and in the reign of Lóegaire mac Néill, high-king of Ireland, to which Dubthach served as Chief Poet and Brehon. In contrast to the king and his druids, he is said to have readily accepted the new religion. This event has played a major part in Hiberno-Latin and Irish sources as representing the integration of native Irish learning with the Christian faith.

== Biography ==
King Lóegaire, jealous of St. Patrick's power, had given orders that when he presented himself next at Tara no one should rise from his seat to do him honour. The next day was Easter day, and it was also a great feast with Lóegaire and his court. In the midst of their festivity, "the doors being shut as in our Lord's case, St. Patrick with five of his companions appeared among them. None rose up at his approach but Dubthach, who had with him a youthful poet named Fiacc, afterwards a bishop. The saint upon this bestowed his blessing on Dubthach, who was the first to believe in God on that day. The Tripartite life of St. Patrick states that Dubthach was then baptised and confirmed, and Jocelyn adds that thenceforward he dedicated to God the poetic gifts he formerly employed in the praise of false gods.

When he had been some time engaged in preaching the gospel in Leinster, St. Patrick paid him a visit. Their meeting took place at Domnach-már-Criathar, now Donaghmore, near Gorey, county Wexford, and St. Patrick inquired whether he had among his "disciples" anyone who was "the material of a bishop, whose qualifications are enumerated in the Book of Armagh". Dubthach replied he knew not any of his people save Fiacc the Fair. At this moment Fiacc was seen approaching. Anticipating his unwillingness to accept the office, St. Patrick and Dubthach resorted to a stratagem. The saint affected to be about to tonsure Dubthach himself, but Fiacc coming forward begged that he might be accepted in his place, and he was accordingly tonsured and baptised, and "the degree of a bishop conferred on him".

Edward O'Reilly, in his Irish Writers, erroneously ascribes to Dubthach "an elegant hymn … preserved in the Calendar of Oengus". One of the manuscripts of that work is indeed in the handwriting of a scribe named Dubthach, but he was quite a different person from Maccu Lugir. Another poem beginning "Tara the house in which lived the son of Conn", found in the Book of Rights, and also assigned to him by O'Reilly, is there said to be the composition of Benen or Benignus. But there is a poem in the Book of Rights which is assigned to him by name. It relates to "the qualifications of the truly learned poet", and consists of thirty-two lines beginning "No one is entitled to visitation or sale of his poems".

There are also three other poems of his preserved in the Book of Leinster. These have been published with a translation by O'Curry in his Manuscript Materials of Irish History. They relate to the wars and triumphs of Enna Cennselach and his son Crimthann, both kings of Leinster. That these poems were written after his conversion to Christianity appears from the following: "It was by me an oratory was first built and a stone cross". The passage of greatest interest in these poems is that in which he says: "It was I that gave judgment between Lóegaire and Patrick". The gloss on this explains: "It was upon Nuadu Derg, the son of Niall [brother of Lóegaire], who killed Odhran, Patrick's charioteer, this judgment was given".

The story is told in the introduction to the Senchus Mor, By order of Lóegaire, Odhran, one of St. Patrick's followers, was killed by Nuadu in order to try whether the saint would carry out his own teaching of forgiveness of injuries. St. Patrick appealing for redress was permitted to choose a judge, and selected Dubthach, who found himself in a difficult position as a Christian administering a pagan law. "Patrick then (quoting St. Matthew 10:20) blessed his mouth and the grace of the Holy Ghost alighted on his utterance", and he pronounced, in a short poem which is preserved in the Senchus Mor, the decision that "Nuadu should be put to death for his crime, but his soul should be pardoned and sent to heaven". This (it is stated) was "a middle course between forgiveness and retaliation". After this sentence "Patrick requested the men of Ireland" to come to one place to hold a conference with him. The result was the appointment of a committee of nine to revise the laws. It was composed of three kings, three bishops, and three professors of literature, poetry, and law. Chief among the latter was Dubthach.

It became his duty to give a historical retrospect, and in doing so Dubthach exhibited "all the judgments of true nature which the Holy Ghost had spoken from the first occupation of this island down to the reception of the faith. What did not clash with the word of God in the written law and in the New Testament and with the consciences of believers was confirmed in the laws of the brehons by Patrick and by the ecclesiastics and chieftains of Ireland. This is the Senchus Mor." It was completed in 441 AD and is supposed to have been suggested by the revision of the Roman laws by Theodosius the younger. It was put into metrical form by Dubthach as an aid to memory, and accordingly, the older parts appear to be in a rude metre. The work was known by various names, The Law of Patrick, Noifis, or The Knowledge of Nine, but more generally as the Senchus Mor.

== Hagiographical traditions ==
Dubhtach is placed by hagiography with his nephew, Saint Fiacc of Sletty, and the jurist, Erc, at the court of Loegaire when Patrick visited Tara. O'Reilly's account states-

When St. Patrick had come to Tara and was preaching before King Loegaire, we are told that the only one who rose on the saint's approach and respectfully saluted him was Dubhthach, the king's poet, who was the first to embrace the Christian faith in that place; and as Joceline says, "being baptized and confirmed in the faith, he turned his poetry, which in the flower and prime of his studies he employed in praise of false gods, to a much better use; changing his mind and style, he composed more elegant poems in praise of the Almighty Creator and His holy preachers."

The descendants of Dubhtach and Fiacc, who the tale says were converted, were blessed by this demonstration of respect. He is at a later date given to have been present on the occasion Patrick made Fiacc a bishop.

== Seanchas Mar ==
Dubhthach gave a judgement against King Loegaire for killing Patrick's charioteer, Saint Odran. A result of this was the revision of the laws of the pagan Irish to bring them in line with Christian values. Dubhtach was one of the nine who revised the laws. What accorded with Christianity was kept, and what did not was excised.

== Surviving poems ==
Four poems ascribed to Dubhtach are extant; one in the Book of Rights, three in the Book of Leinster. Edward O'Reilly gives a full account of these in his Irish Writers, XXX sq.; d. anno 433.

== Family ==
Dubthach may be related to Mo Laisse maccu Lugair, whose feast day is given as 16 September in the Martyrology of Tallaght and Félire Óengusso. Both martyrologies state that his church was found among the Uí Fhairchelláin, near Mountrath, County Laois.

=== Descendants ===
Dubhtach was in a later tradition made a prospective husband for Saint Brigit. She declined him but helped him find a bride. He is given as the father of several sons, all saints and founders of churches, mainly in Leinster. They included Fachtna of Kiltoom, in the barony of Fore, County Westmeath, other sons were Trian, Saint Gabhran, Saint Euhel, Moninne, Lonan and Saint Molaisse Mac Lugair. His granddaughter, Dediva (also called Editua or Dedi or Deidi or Deighe or Deidiu or Deaga or Mediva), daughter of Trian, was the alleged mother of saints and poets, including Saint Senan of Laraghabrine, son of Fintan, Saint Diarmaid the Just, son of Lugna, Saint Caillin, son of Niata, Saint Felim of Kilmore, son of Carill, Saint Daigh, son of Carill, Saint Femia, daughter of Carill, St. Manchin, son of Collan of Corann and Senchán Torpéist, another Chief Ollam of Ireland, which latter son is in keeping with the tradition of ollams coming generally from families who had a tradition of producing ollams.

Preceded by Adna mac Uthidir	Chief Ollam of Ireland ca. 432	Succeeded by Dallán Forgaill
