= Book of Fenagh =

16th-century Irish manuscript

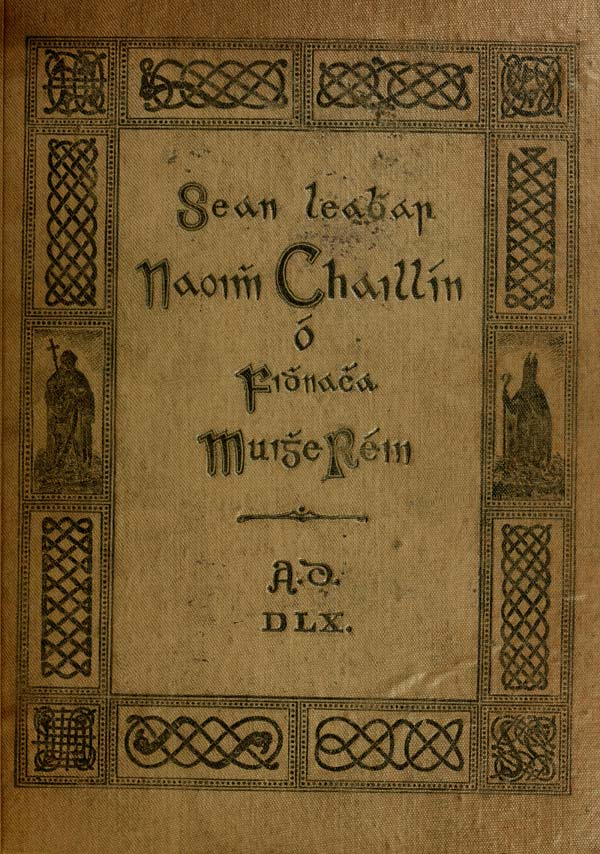
19th century reproduction of the Book of Fenagh. The original is held by the Royal Irish Academy

The Book of Fenagh (Irish: Leabar Fidhnacha) is a manuscript of prose and poetry written in Classical Irish by Muirgheas mac Pháidín Ó Maolconaire in the monastery at Fenagh, West Breifne (modern-day County Leitrim). It was commissioned by Tadhg Ó Rodaighe, the coarb of the monastery, and is believed to derive from the "old Book of Caillín" (Irish: Leabar Chaillín), a lost work about Caillín, founder of the monastery. Ó Maolconaire began work about 1516.

== Provenance ==
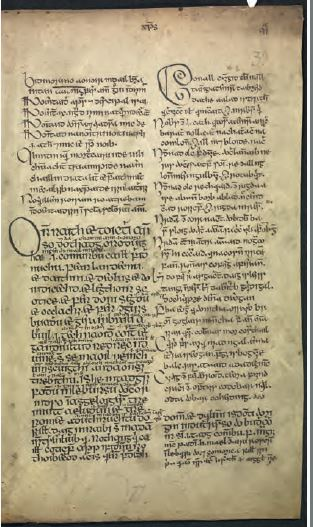
Folio

The O'Roddy coarbs and descendants retained the book down to Brian O'Roddy, parish priest of Kilronan (Ballyfarnon) in the mid-19th century, upon whose death it was retained by his successors as parish priest. It later passed to George Michael Conroy, Bishop of Ardagh and Clonmacnoise, for safe-keeping, before his successor Bartholomew Woodlock sold it in 1888 to the Royal Irish Academy (RIA) for £10. This was on the advice of Denis Murphy, a Jesuit, that the RIA were best able to preserve it. Its catalogue number is RIA MS 23 P 26: Cat. No. 479.

John O'Donovan made a facsimile transcript in 1828, and a manuscript English translation in 1830. The first published edition was in 1875, edited by William Maunsell Hennessy and translated by Denis H. Kelly from O'Donovan's facsimile. The Irish Manuscripts Commission published a supplementary volume in 1939 with material missing from previous versions.

== Contents ==
Part	Form	Subject
1A	Prose	Introduction and Genealogy of St. Caillín
1B	Poetry	14 poems about Caillín, Magh Rein (south County Leitrim), and the Bell of Fenagh (Clog Na Riogh, "the bell of the kings", now in St Mel's Cathedral).
1C	Prose	Introductions to Poems
2A	Prose	Caillín and Tadhg O'Roddy
2B	Prose	Ó Maolconaire discusses the Old Book of Caillín
3	Poetry	The O'Donnells and other families
4	Prose	Genealogies of Conmaicne, O'Crechan (probably of Conmaicne Dúna Móir), and the Abbot of Fenagh
5	Poetry	Six poems: five on the O'Neills and other families, and one on Caillín

Marginal notes in Irish adorning the book are commentaries by the noted Irish antiquarian Tadhg O'Rodaighe (floruit 1700) from Crossfield in Fenagh. The book was used as a source for the Annals of Connacht and the Annals of the Four Masters.

== Cumdach ==
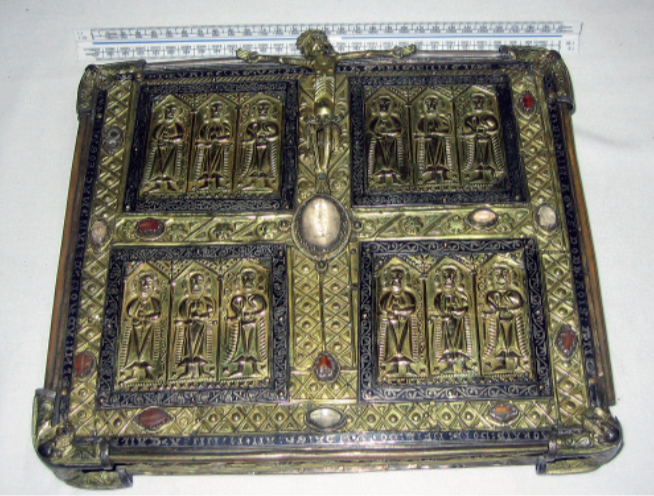
Shrine of Caillín

A metal cumdach (a book-shaped shrine) known as the "Shrine of Caillín" was built before 1536 to hold and protect the manuscript. Caillín is described by Lucas as "something of a specialist in the production of battle talismans" and according to legend, in his lifetime commissioned a number of battle standards, including this shrine. The shrine was badly damaged in a 2009 fire at St Mel's Cathedral, Longford, where it had been kept since 1980. It was acquired by the National Museum of Ireland the following year, while the manuscript is in the collection of the Royal Irish Academy. There is some doubt as to if the shrine was actually intended as a cumdach, given that it is smaller than the manuscript.

== Sources ==
- "Book of Fenagh 500th anniversary". Royal Irish Academy. 2016. Archived from the original on 14 January 2020.
- Lucas, Anthony. "The Social Role of Relics and Reliquaries in Ancient Ireland". The Journal of the Royal Society of Antiquaries of Ireland, volume 116, 1986. JSTOR 25508904
- Ó Maolconaire, Muirgheas mac Pháidín (1875). Hennessy, W. M. (ed.). "The Book of Fenagh in Irish and English". Translated by Kelly, D. H. Dublin: Alexander Thom. (Another digitisation from National Library of Scotland)
- Macalister, R. A. S., ed. (1939). The Book of Fenagh: supplementary volume. Irish Manuscripts Commission.
- Scott, Brendan. "The Making of the Book of Fenagh". History Ireland, volume 25, no. 3, 2017. JSTOR 90014529
