= Nurney, County Carlow =

Village in County Carlow, Ireland

Nurney An Urnaí
- Village
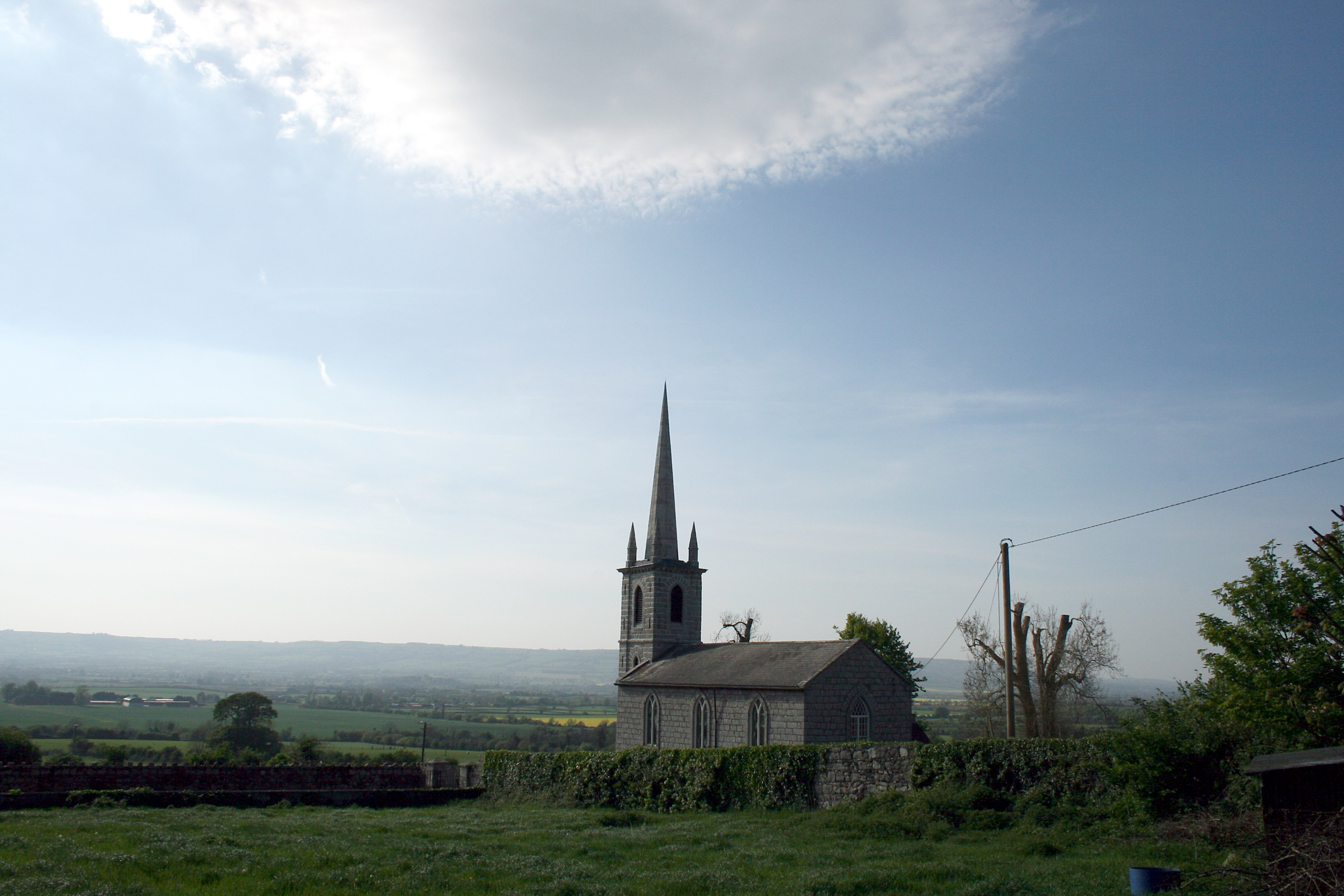
- St. John's Church

- Location in Ireland
- Coordinates: 52°45′02″N 6°54′35″W
- Country: Ireland
- Province: Leinster
- County: County Carlow
- Elevation: 144 m (472 ft)
- Time zone: UTC+0 (WET)
  - Summer (DST): UTC-1 (IST (WEST))
- Irish Grid Reference: S736671

Nurney (Irish: An Urnaí) is a village, civil parish and townland in County Carlow, Ireland.

== Historic sites ==
The name suggests that there may have been a monastic site on the site in the 4th or 5th century. St. John's Church (Church of Ireland) is a listed structure, which was built by the local landlord, John Bruen, in the 1780s, along with a schoolhouse.

Nurney Cross, located near St. John's Church, is a very early example of a high cross and is a National Monument.

== Sports ==
Nurney is home to Nurney Villa, an association football (soccer) club which competes in the Carlow Premier Division.

== See also ==
- List of towns and villages in Ireland
