= Aghade Holed Stone =

National monument of Ireland

- Gallán Pollta Áth Fhád
- Cloghaphoill
- Location within Ireland
- 52.770101°N 6.746804°W
- Location: Aghade, Tullow, County Carlow, Ireland

History
- Built: early Bronze Age, 2000–1600 BC

Site notes
- Material: granite
- Height: 2.4 metres (7.9 ft)
- Width: 1.56 metres (5.1 ft)

National monument of Ireland
- Official name: Aghade (Cloghaphoill)
- Reference no.: 347

Aghade Holed Stone or Cloghaphoill is a large holed stone and a national monument located two miles south of Tullow in Aghade, County Carlow, Ireland.

== Description ==
The holed stone is granite, measures approximately 2.4 x 1.56 x 0.46 metres, weighs close to 5 tonnes, and has a hole about 32 centimetres (13 in) in diameter near the top. It is similar in size to the "Holestone" found in County Antrim at Doagh.

== History and legend ==
Archaeologists believe that the stone was originally a door to a megalithic tomb. The hole may have permitted the offering of food or other objects to the dead.

The 14th-century Book of Ballymote offers a story where Niall of the Nine Hostages ties Eochaid, son of Énnae Cennsalach mac Labhradh (a 5th-century King of Leinster) to the Aghade Holed Stone and sends nine men to kill him:

Then Niall went to Leinster upon a hosting, and he said that he would not go from them so long as he was alive, or until Echu were given him as a pledge and hostage. And this had to be done. So he was taken to Ath Fadat [Fád's ford] in Fothairt Fea on the bank of the Slaney, and was left there before Niall, with a chain around his neck, and the end of the chain through the hole of a stone pillar. Nine champions advance towards him to slay him. 'Woe!' said Echu, 'this is bad indeed!' With that he gave himself a twist, so that the chain broke in two. He seized the iron bolt that was through the chain, and advanced to meet them. He plied the bolt on them so that the nine fell.

— Orcuin Néill Nóigíallaig (The Slaying of Niall of the Nine Hostages)

Up to the 18th century it was common for sick children to be passed through the hole, in the belief that this would cure them or to ensure good health.
