= Cearbhall mac Lochlainn Ó Dálaigh =

Irish poet

Cearbhall mac Lochlainn Ó Dálaigh (died 1404) was an Irish poet.

Described as Chief Ollam of Ireland in poetry, Cearbhall died in Corcomroe, County Clare in 1405. Edward O'Reilly gives a description in his Dictionary of Irish Writers under the year AD 1404, paragraph CLIV.

His obit is given in the Annals of Ulster as "U1405.2 Cerball Ua Dalaigh, namely, ollam of Corcomruadh, died", in the Annals of the Four Masters as "M1404.9 Carroll O'Daly, Ollav of Corcomroe died" and in the Annals of Connacht as "1404.20 Cerball O Dalaig, ollav in Poetry of Corcumroe, died."

== See also ==
- Cú Connacht Ó Dálaigh, died 1139
- Máel Íosa Ó Dálaigh, died 1185
- Donnchadh Mór Ó Dálaigh, died 1244
- Muireadhach Albanach, alive 1228
- Gofraidh Fionn Ó Dálaigh, died 1387
- Aonghus Fionn Ó Dálaigh, died 1570
- Lochlann Óg Ó Dálaigh, fl. c. 1610
- Cearbhall Óg Ó Dálaigh, fl. 1630

Preceded by Gofraidh Fionn Ó Dálaigh	Chief Ollam of Ireland; 1387–1405	Succeeded by Sean mac Fergail Óicc Ó hUiccinn
