= Ó Dálaigh =

Learned Irish bardic family

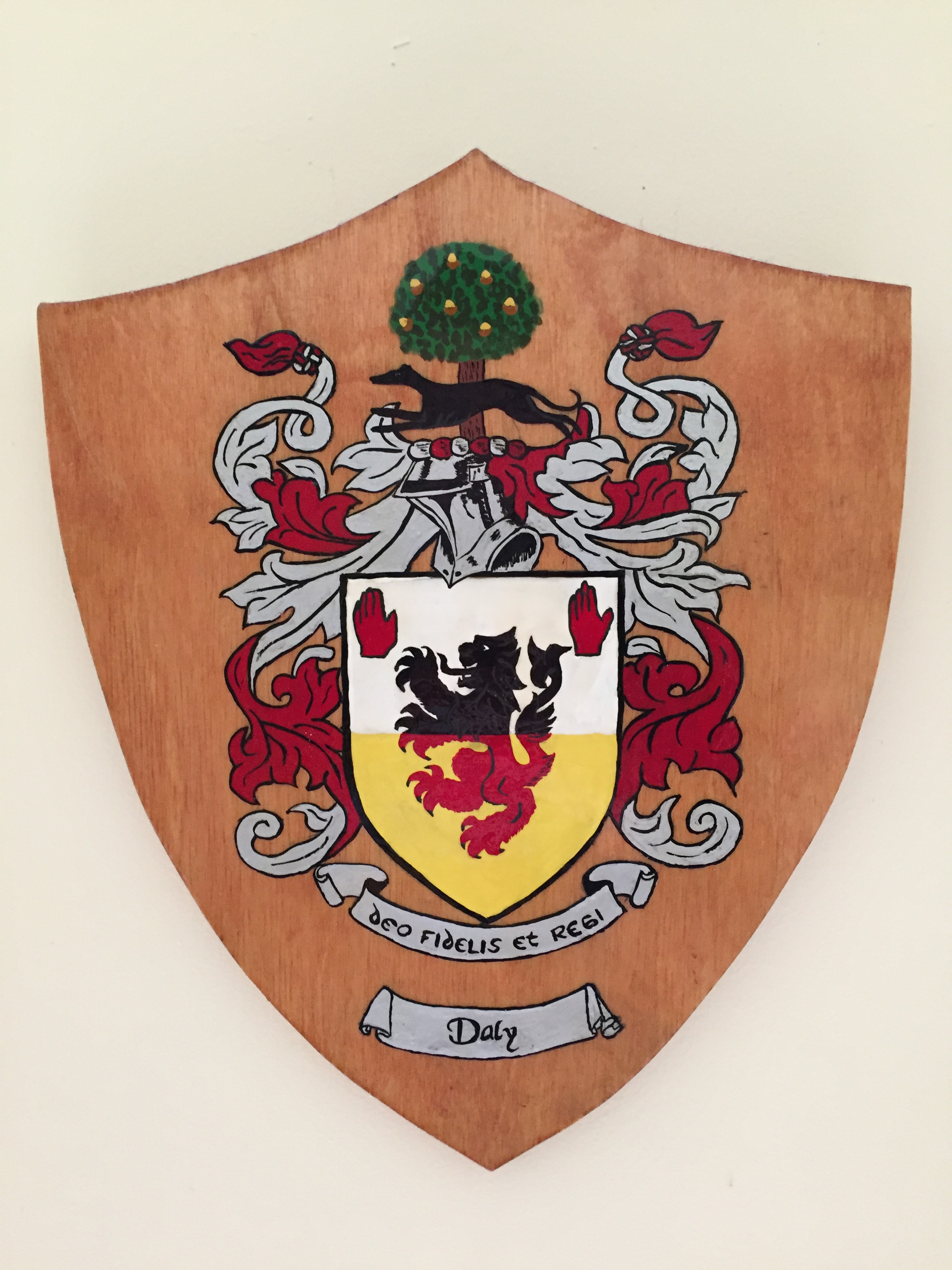
- The Latin motto translates as 'Faithful to God and King', an Irish language alternative meaning 'Swift and Strong' (referencing the greyhound crest and lion blazon), is often preferred.
- Current region: Throughout Ireland and the Irish diaspora
- Etymology: Descendant of Dálach
- Origin: Westmeath, Ireland
- Connected families: Clann MacMhuirich
- Distinctions: Many Chief Ollamhs (Chief Poets) of Ireland and also Scotland
- Traditions: The most prominent Irish bardic family
- Estates: Corca Adaimh, Corca Raidhe, Mhuintir Bháire, Finnavara, Dunsandle and others (historical).

The Ó Dálaigh (Irish pronunciation: [oː ˈd̪ˠaːlˠiː]) were a learned Irish bardic family who first came to prominence early in the 12th century, when Cú Connacht Ó Dálaigh was described as "The first Ollamh of poetry in all Ireland" (ollamh is the title given to university professors in Modern Irish).

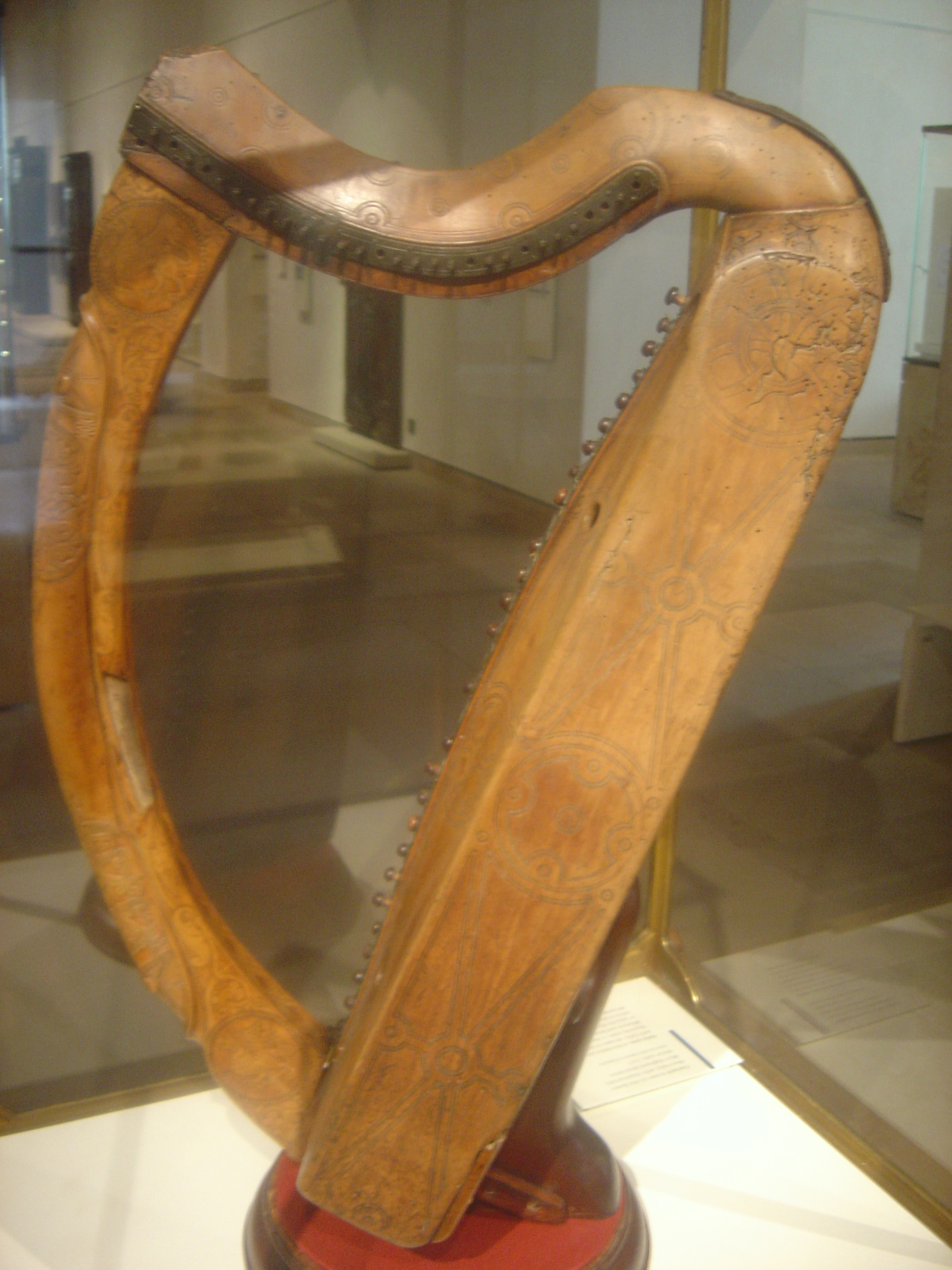
"Harp of Cnoc I'Chosgair, you who bring sleep to eyes long sleepless; sweet subtle, plangent, glad, cooling grave. Excellent instrument with smooth gentle curve, trilling under red fingers, musician that has charmed us, red, lion-like of full melody. You who lure the bird from the flock, you who refresh the mind, brown spotted one of sweet words, ardent, wondrous, passionate." Gofraidh Fionn Ó Dálaigh.

The modern Irish surnames O'Daly, Daly, Daley, Dayley, Dalley, Daily, Dailey and Dawley are derived from Ó Dálaigh.

== Name derivation ==
The name Ó Dálaigh means 'descendant of Dálach'. The derivation of the personal name Dálach is not entirely obvious, but the most widely accepted theory is that it derives from the same root as dáil meaning "assembly;" the Irish Parliament is called 'Dáil Éireann.' Dálach therefore probably meant "assemblyman" or "councillor".

== Origins and ancestry ==
The earliest records of the family place them in the region of Tethba in what is now Westmeath, their lands were in Moyashel & Magheradernon barony, Westmeath. The ancestral clan was called Corca Adaimh ('Race of Adam') and they claimed descent from a son of Niall of the Nine Hostages (High King of Ireland circa 400AD) via Máel Dúin mac Máele Fithrich of the Cenél maic Ercae, who was king of Ailech in Ulster. Máel Dúin's sons included the high king Fergal mac Máele Dúin and Adamh, the Ó Dálaigh ancestor. However, one source claims that Adamh was a son of, confusingly, another Máel Dúin the son of Fergal mac Máele Dúin. The great-grandson of Adamh was called Dálach, from whom the later surname derived. The Ó Dálaigh claimed kinship with the O'Neills and O'Donnells.

Gofraidh Fionn Ó Dálaigh asserted a descent for the family from a 6th-century Dálach, who was the pupil of the saint and poet Colmán the patron of the cathedral town of Cloyne. Dalach is said to have become a bishop of the early Irish Church.

The Ó Dálaigh who settled in Munster seem to have been given an alternative descent from the Eóganacht kings of Cashel, in particular from Aenghus the king of Cashel who was baptised by Saint Patrick. However, this pedigree is less well attested than that deriving from Niall and there is no clear indication that the Munster branch of the Ó Dálaigh were considered to have had separate origins from the others. It may merely represent an attempt to integrate the bardic family with the local dynasties they served.

== Migration across Ireland ==
Beginning in the early 12th century the Ó Dálaigh became scattered across Ireland, serving many royal dynasties. This diaspora may have been influenced by the Norman invasions, which began around 1172. However, they remained chieftains in their ancestral lands in Westmeath. The earliest of these new branches of the family were in counties Cork, Roscommon, Clare and Sligo.

The Ó Dálaigh continued to achieve prominence in the societies of their new homelands, becoming poets to various royal courts across Ireland and ruling as minor chiefs over lands outside of Westmeath.

== An eminent dynasty of bards ==
"The chiefs of high Corca Adhamh, O'Dalaigh of lasting renown". Many of the Ó Dálaigh were hereditary poets to the various Irish royal courts and a number of them held the post of Ard Ollamh (Chief Poet of Ireland). The Ard Ollamh ranked with the High King of Ireland in the social hierarchy, and maintained his own court. More than one member of the Ó Dálaigh family held both this post and the post of Chief Ollamh of Scotland. The chief poet of the family was known as "The Ó Dálaigh" in the same manner that the Prince of Thomond was called "The O'Brien".

Members of the clan founded bardic schools throughout Ireland, and also in Scotland. The noble bards of Ireland were accorded great prestige and were accounted filid or "men of skill"; in social rank, they were placed below kings but above all others. The Ó Dálaigh were the foremost practitioners of the exacting and difficult poetry form known as Dán Díreach throughout the Late Medieval period. Part of the prestige that attached to the Irish bardic ollamh was derived from fear; a leader satirised in a glam dicenn (satire-poem), by a very able poet, could find his social position badly undermined. Very talented poets were also believed to possess the power to raise boils on the face of the target of their satires or inflict other bodily harm (early Irish society placed great store on the physical appearance of leaders). Conversely, the praise of a skilled poet was very greatly valued as it enhanced social and political prestige.

In addition to their poetry, the senior members of the Ó Dálaigh sept were also chieftains, their lands included the minor 'kingdom' of Corca Raidhe (Corcaree) in Meath and Mhuintir Bháire in Cork. Royal courts would often grant lands to their bards, and many townlands such as Ballydaly, near Strokestown, County Roscommon, commemorate this in their names. In theory, the lands of Irish poets were held sacrosanct and could not be despoiled during warfare or raiding. Other members of the family were ecclesiastics: monks, abbots and bishops; they often combined their church roles with the production of religious poetry.

The Irish bardic poet was often intimately involved in dynastic politics and warfare, a number of the Ó Dálaigh died violent deaths, or caused the violent deaths of others; the murderous, axe-wielding crusader Muireadhach Albanach Ó Dálaigh is the archetype of the warlike Irish poet.

== Notable family members ==
=== Medieval period ===
- Cú Connacht Ó Dálaigh, also called Cuchonnacht na Sgoile ('of the [bardic] school'), "The first ollamh of poetry in all Ireland". He died at the monastery of Clonard, Meath, in 1139. His is the earliest recorded use of the name Ó Dálaigh.
- Ragnall Ua Dálaigh, died 1161.
- Gilla na Trínóite Ua Dálaigh, chief poet of the Kingdom of Desmond in Munster, was killed by the son of Cormac Mac Carthaig in 1166.
- Tadhg Ua Dálaigh, Chief Ollamh of Ireland and Scotland, died 1181.
- Máel Íosa Ua Dálaigh, died 1185, was described as "Chief poet of Ireland and Scotland", he was also lord (ard taoiseach) of the minor midland kingdom of Corca Raidhe. The annals state that in 1185, Maelisa O'Daly, ollave (chief poet) of Ireland and Scotland, Lord of Corcaree and Corca-Adain, a man illustrious for his poetry, hospitality, and nobility, died while on a pilgrimage at Clonard.
- Aonghus Ó Dálaigh, the common ancestor of all the O'Dalys extant, fl. 1200
- Muireadhach Albanach Ó Dálaigh, fl. 1213–1220. Brother of Donnchadh Mór, he had to flee Ireland after killing an insolent royal steward (of the lord of Tír Conaill) called Fionn O'Brollaghan with an axe. He reputedly founded a Scottish branch of the family, Clann MacMhuirich. From the evidence of his poems he took part in the Fifth Crusade.
- Donnchadh Mór Ó Dálaigh. In recording his death, in 1244, the Annals of the Four Masters describes him as "a poet who never was and never will be surpassed". He has been called the 'Irish Ovid', for the smoothness of his verse. He was probably the abbot of the monastery of Boyle in Roscommon and wrote many religious poems. At Finnyvara, in County Clare, a monument exists to Donnchadh Mór near the site of the Ó'Dálaigh bardic school. His poems indicate that he was born in Meath.
- Lughaidh (Louis) Ó Dálaigh, died 1337, Bishop of Clonmacnoise.
- Aonghus Ruadh Ó Dálaigh of Meath, fl. 1325. Reputedly his satire-poems on a fellow chieftain were so scathing that his victim emigrated from the Irish midlands to Clare in Munster to escape them. "Aengus Ua Dalaigh the Red (namely; son of Donnchadh, son of Aengus, son of Donnchadh Mor), a sage without defect, died." Annal of 1347.
- Gofraidh Fionn Ó Dálaigh of Cork, d. 1387. Chief Ollamh of Ireland. In 1351 a convention of poets and men of learning was held by Uilliam Buide Ó Ceallaigh (the Nodlaig na Garma); this occasion was commemorated in Gofraidh Fionn Ó Dálaigh's poem Filidh Éireann go haointeach.
- Cearbhall mac Lochlainn Ó Dálaigh, d. 1405, Chief Ollamh of Ireland in poetry, died in Corca Mruadh (County Clare).
- Fearghal Ó Dálaigh, d. 1420
- Tadhg Ó Dalaigh, Bishop of Achonry, 1436–1442. Appointed 3 September 1436; died in Rome before 15 October 1442; also known as Thaddaeus and Nicholas O'Daly.
- Seaán Ó Dálaigh, Bishop of Clonmacnoise, 1444–1487.
- Cormac mhac Taidhg Bhallaigh Ó Dálaigh, unclear when active, unknown dates between 1200 and 1600

=== Early modern era ===
- Aonghus Fionn Ó Dálaigh (known as "The Pious"), fl. 1520–1570, prob. born County Meath; head of the branch of the Ó Dálaigh family who were poets to the MacCarthys of Desmond. His poem to the Blessed Virgin, Grian na Maighdean Máthair Dé (Sun of All Maidens is the Mother of God) is extant.
- Maoilsheachlainn Óg Ó Dálaigh, d. 1578. Court poet of Gerald FitzGerald, 14th Earl of Desmond.
- Aonghus Ruadh na nAor Ó Dálaigh, (1550–1617). He was employed by Sir George Carew and Mountjoy to lampoon the Irish chieftains and instigate enmity between them. The hostile reaction to his satire "The Tribes of Ireland" led to his assassination.
- Cearbhall Óg Ó Dálaigh of Ossory, fl. 1620. Composer of many dánta grádha love poems and the celebrated song Eileanóir a Rún (Eleanor my Darling/Love), also known as 'Eileen Aroon'.
- Dominic Ó Dálaigh (1596–1662), born in Kerry, he entered Dominican Order in Galicia as Dominic de Rosario. He was Rector of the University of Louvain and established an Irish College of Dominicans in Lisbon. Dominic Ó Dálaigh later acted as advisor to the Queen of Portugal and Portuguese envoy to Louis XIV. He was Bishop elect of Coimbra and president of the privy council of Portugal. His works include Initium, incrementa et exitus familiae Geraldinorum Desmoniae comitum (The Geraldines, Earls of Desmond), published in Lisbon in 1655; Dominic was a descendant of the Geraldines on his mother's side.
- Lochlann Óg Ó Dálaigh, fl. ca. 1610. He wrote poetry lamenting the eclipse of the native society and culture of Ireland. "Cait ar ghabhader Gaoidhil"; "Where have the Gaels gone?" he asked, and answered himself thus: "In their place we have a proud impure swarm of foreigners".

== Later history of the sept ==
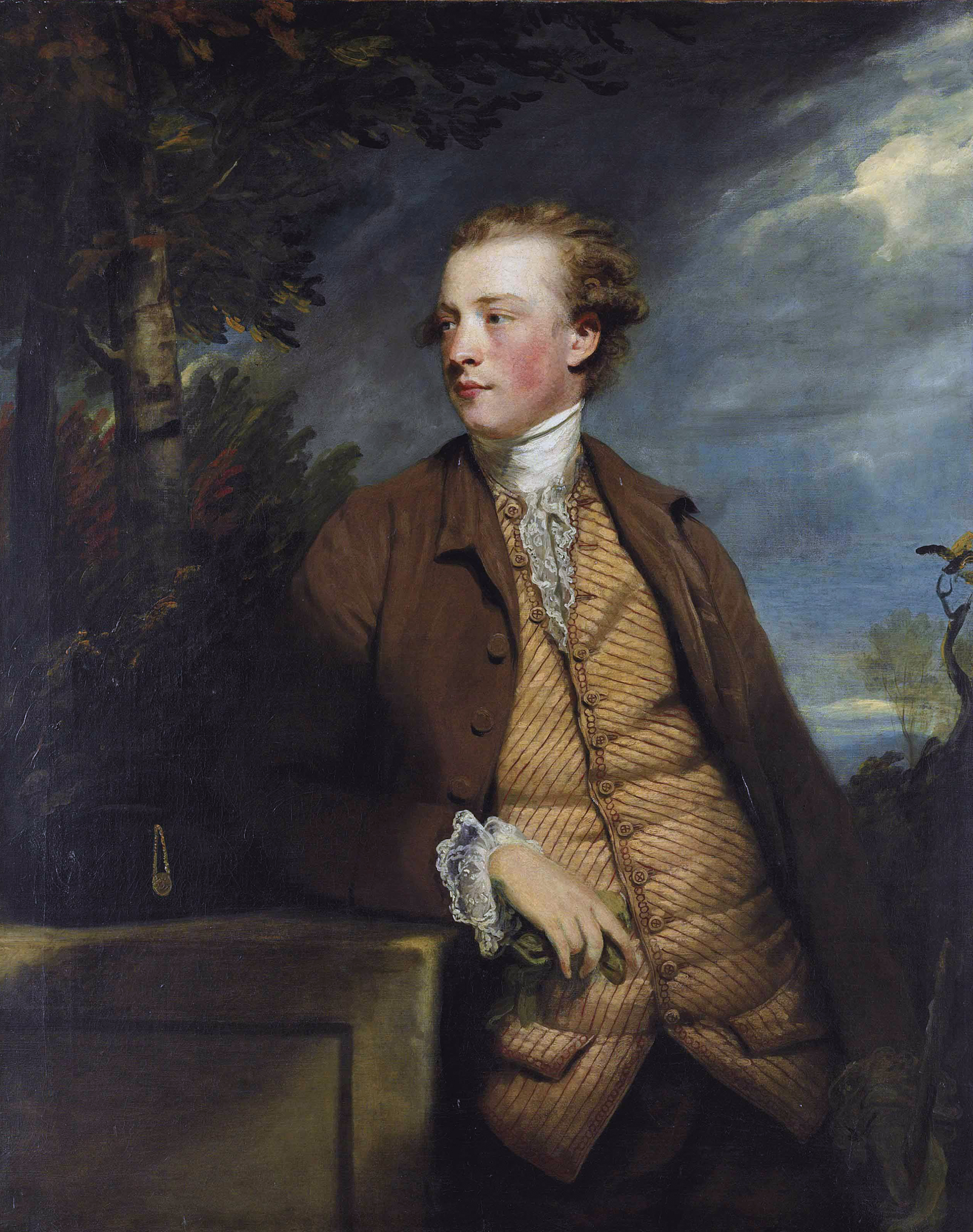
Denis Daly of Dunsandle, MP for Galway. A portrait by Joshua Reynolds. The name Denis was used as an anglicised approximation of Donnchadh

The end of the prominence of the Gaelic-speaking nobility of Ireland, epitomised by the Flight of the Earls, in the early 17th century meant the social eclipse of those bardic families, such as the Ó Dálaigh, that depended on their patronage. The name Ó Dálaigh also changed, becoming anglicised to Daly, O'Daly, Dayley, Daley, Dailey or Dawley. With the loss of land in the wake of rebellions against English rule and in the Plantations of Ireland, most branches of the Ó Dálaigh became, to a greater or lesser extent, impoverished. An example of this is the fate of the Dalys of Mhuintir Bháire (the Sheep's Head Peninsula, Cork), relatives and descendants of Aonghus Ruadh Ó Dálaigh (Aonghus Ruadh na nAor); they lost the last of their land in the aftermath of the fall of James II, and were reduced to the state of struggling tenant farmers.

Many responded by emigrating and some gained distinction abroad, such as Dionisio (Denis) O'Daly who, following a Jesuit education in France, married into an Irish merchant family in Santa Cruz de La Palma, Canary Islands. Following involvement in local politics he became the first elected government official in Spain (1767), following an escape from prison and a legal battle. The main street in the island capital's is named after him.

Several members of an O'Daly family from Cloonbrusk, Co. Galway, prospered in Spain and her colonies, beginning with Dominican friar Denis O'Daly who became influential in the Spanish Court from 1726 and sponsored many Irish emigrant nobles and military officers. These included his nephew, Thomas who joined the Spanish military in 1744 and, after qualifying as a military engineer in Barcelona, was responsible for designing the port and rebuilding the pier in Gijón (1754). He later became Chief Engineer of the fortifications in Puerto Rico (1766), where he established himself and married. His son Demetrio became one of Puerto Rico's most famous military officers and politicians. His brother, known as Jaime (likely James) O'Daly y Blake, had a colorful career as a merchant in Cadiz and colonist in the Caribbean before eventually also settling in Puerto Rico as a merchant, following a personal plea to the king.

In Ireland, one prominent exception to the trend of impoverishment was the Daly family of Dunsandle, which became part of the Protestant Ascendancy though its members often espoused the extension of Catholic rights. Generations of this family served as mayors of, and MPs for, Galway, they were also raised to the peerage as Barons of Dunsandle. The Dunsandle Dalys claimed descent from Donnchadh Mór Ó Dálaigh and incorporated the Red Hand of Ulster into their coat of arms to record their ancient Uí Néill connections. Ultimately, the Dalys of Dunsandle retained their wealth and political prominence, but at the cost of losing the faith and culture their ancestors long upheld.

A member of the above-mentioned line, Denis St. George Daly, won a gold medal for men's polo at the 1900 Summer Olympics in Paris.

== Portuguese branch ==
Daniel O'Daly, son of Charles O'Daly and wife Mary O'Keefe and paternal grandson of Cornelius O'Daly, came to Portugal due to the religious persecutions in Ireland and married there Maria Madalena de Placência Spínola, daughter of António Pereira da Cunha and wife Júlia Maria de Placência Spínola, by whom he had at least one daughter, paternal grandmother of the 1st Viscount of Juromenha.

== References and sources ==
Notes

Sources

- Connellan, T. (Ed.) (1860) The Proceedings of the Great Bardic Institution. Dublin.
- Daly, Edmund E. (1937). History of the O'Dalys; the story of the ancient Irish sept; the race of Dalach of Corca Adaimh. New Haven, Conn.: Tuttle, Morehouse and Taylor. p. 479. OCLC 4286380..
- Koch, J.T., (2006) Celtic Culture: A Historical Encyclopedia, ABC-CLIO, ISBN 1-85109-440-7
- Leland, M. (1999) The lie of the land: Journeys Through Literary Cork, Cork University Press. ISBN 1-85918-231-3
- Mangan, J.C. (trans.) (1852) The Tribes of Ireland: a Satire. by Aenghus O'Daly, with poetical tr. by J. C. Mangan; together with An historical account of the family of O'Daly; and an introduction to the history of satire in Ireland, by J. O'Donovan, Dublin.
- Rigby, S.H., (2003) A Companion to Britain in the Later Middle Ages, Historical Association, Blackwell Publishing, ISBN 0-631-21785-1
- Welsh, Robert, (1996) Oxford Concise Companion to Irish Literature. ISBN 0-19-280080-9
