= Máel Íosa Ua Dálaigh =

Irish poet and noble, 12th century

Máel Íosa Ua Dálaigh was an Irish poet. He died in 1185.

== Biography ==
Máel Íosa (meaning "Follower of Jesus") was a member of the Ó Dálaigh family of bards, of whom some forty are attested in Ireland and Scotland between the 12th and 17th centuries.

Upon his death, he was described as "Chief poet of Ireland and Scotland." He was also lord of the minor midland kingdom of Corca Raidhe in what is now County Westmeath. The Irish annals give his obit sub anno 1185, stating:

"Maelisa O'Daly, ollave (chief poet) of Ireland and Scotland, Lord of Corcaree and Corca-Adain, a man illustrious for his poetry, hospitality, and nobility, died while on a pilgrimage at Clonard."

Máel Íosa would appear to have been the chief of the senior branch of the Ó Dálaigh, based in their ancestral home in Westmeath.

| Preceded by Tadhg Ua Dálaigh | Chief Ollam of Ireland; 1181–1185 | Succeeded by Giolla Ernain Ó Martain |

== See also ==
- Cú Connacht Ó Dálaigh, died 1139
- Donnchadh Mór Ó Dálaigh, died 1244
- Muireadhach Albanach, alive 1228
- Gofraidh Fionn Ó Dálaigh, died 1387
- Aonghus Fionn Ó Dálaigh, died 1570
- Lochlann Óg Ó Dálaigh, fl. c. 1610
- Cearbhall Óg Ó Dálaigh, fl. 1630
