= Donnchadh Mór Ó Dálaigh =

Irish poet

Donnchadh Mór Ó Dálaigh was an Irish poet and master of the Irish classical style called Dán Díreach, who died in 1244. Mor is the Irish word for "great".

== Family background ==
Donnchadh Mór was a member of the Ó Dálaigh family of poets. Donnchadh Mór was the second of six brothers, one of whom was Muireadhach Albanach, also a poet. Authorities O'Reilly and O'Curry considered that he was Abbot of Boyle Abbey, County Roscommon, Ireland.

== Reputation ==
The annals of Clonmacnois describe him as "Chief in Ireland for poetry". He was styled the 'Irish Ovid' due to the quality of his verse. In recording his death, in 1244, the Annals of the Four Masters describes him as "a poet who never was and never will be surpassed".

== Finvarra ==
Donnchadh Mór settled at Finnyvara (or Finavara) in the Burren region of County Clare, Ireland. Today a hexagonal brick-built columnar monument stands outside Finavara on the coast by Pouldoody Bay as a monument to him, opposite the supposed ruined poetry school of the Ó Dálaigh's. The Ó Dálaighs occupied a rock seat nearby termed the 'Brehon's Chair' used for open air courts in ancient times and they may be buried in the mound below the monument.

O'Donovan in a note to the Annals of the Four Masters states that according to tradition preserved in the north of the County Clare he was the head of the O'Dalys of Finnyvara in the north of Burrin where they still point out the site of his house and his monument. The Ó Dálaigh's of Finnyvara were hereditary poets to the Ó Lochlainn's of Burren.

== Poems ==
Donnchadh Mór is known to have written about 30 poems. Donnchadh Mór's poems were listed in The History of the O'Dalys by Edmund Emmet O'Daly, published in 1937 by the Tuttle, Morehouse and Taylor Company of New Haven, Connecticut, USA.

== Selected poems ==
- Buime trír máthair mhic Dé
- Cúig cáis as mhó le Moire
- Dia do bheatha-sa, a Mhuire
- Do-ní duine dia dá mhaoin
- Éisd rem fhaoisidin, a Íosa
- Fuaras mian, ón, fuaras mian
- Garbh éirghe iodhan bhrátha
- Marthain duit, a chroch an Choimdheadh
- Námha m'anma an chalann chriadh
- Rugadh báire ar an mbochtacht
- A chopráin, is truagh do chor +
- A chroch naomhtha, nocht dod ghrásaibh +
- A dhuíne, féach ar an uaigh +
- A Íosa Críosd, créad an tiol? +
- A naomh Mhuire, a mháthair Dé +
- An té do riaradh le beagán +
- A-tá sunn rulla na ríogh, attributed to Flann Mainistreach +

+ A Bardic Miscellany: Five Hundred Bardic poems from manuscripts in Irish and British libraries, edited by Damian McManus and Eoghan Ó Raghallaigh, Trinity Irish Studies, Dublin, 2010.

== See also ==
- Cú Connacht Ua Dálaigh, died 1139.
- Ragnall Ua Dálaigh, died 1161
- Gilla na Trínóite Ua Dálaigh, died 1166.
- Tadhg Ua Dálaigh, died 1181
- Aonghus Ó Dálaigh, fl. c. 1200.

== Family Tree I ==
In the introduction to The Tribes of Ireland by Aonghus Ruadh na nAor Ó Dálaigh, the editors give the following family tree.

 Adhamh, a quo Corca Adhamh of County Westmeath
 |
 |
 Corc
 |
 |
 Fachtna
 |
 |
 Dalach, a quo Ua Dálaigh
 |
 |
 Gilla Coimhdheadh
 |
 |
 Tadhg ua Dálaigh
 |
 |
 Muireadhach Ua Dálaigh
 |
 |
 Dalach Ua Dálaigh
 |
 |
 Cú Connacht Ua Dálaigh, died 1139.
 |
 |
 Tadhg Doichleach Ua Dálaigh, died 1181.
 |
 |
 Aonghus Ó Dálaigh, the common ancestor of all the O'Dalys extant
 |
 |______________________________________________________________________________________________________
 |                   |                       |                        |                |              |
 |                   |                       |                        |                |              |
 Cearbhall Fionn  Donnchadh Mór   Cormac na Casbhairne Muireadhach Albanach Gilla na Naemh Tadhg
 |                   |                                                            (issue)             |
 |                   |                                                                                |
 |                   |                                                                                |
Ua Dálaigh Fionn Ua Dálaigh Ua Dálaigh
of Duhallow of Finvarra of Breifne
Co. Cork.          Co. Clare
                   and Dunsandle
                   Co. Galway

== Family Tree II ==
  Donnchadh Mór mac Aonghus meic Tadhg Doichleach Ó Dálaigh of Finvarra, died 1244.
  |
  |
  Aonghus
  |
  |
  Donnchadh Ruadh
  |
  |
  Aonghus Ruadh Ó Dálaigh, died 1350.
  |
  |___________________________________
  |                                  |
  |                                  |
  Tadhg, d. 1367.                    Lochlainn, died 1367.
  |                                  |
  |                                  |
  Fearghal Ó Dálaigh, chief poet Donn
  of Corcomroe, fl. 1420.            |
                                     |
                                     Doighre
                                     |
                                     |
                                     Donn
                                     |
                                     |
                                     Mael Sechlainn
                                     |
                                     |
                                     John
                                     |
                                     |
                                     Tadhg
                                     |
                                     |
                                     Diarmuid
                                     |
                                     |
                                     Aedh of Finnvarra.
