= Gilla na Trínóite Ua Dálaigh =

Irish poet

Gilla na Trínóite Ua Dálaigh, Irish poet, killed 1166.

Gilla na Trínóite was an early member of the Ó Dálaigh family of poets. At the time of his death, he was Ollamh of Kingdom of Desmond.

The Annals of Inisfallen state, sub anno 1166, that:

- Gilla na Trínóite Ua Dálaig, ollav of Desmumu, was slain.

He does not appear in the Daly family genealogies.

== See also ==
- Cú Connacht Ua Dálaigh, died 1139.
- Ragnall Ua Dálaigh, died 1161.
- Tadhg Ua Dálaigh, died 1181.
- Aonghus Ó Dálaigh, fl. c. 1200.
