= Daly (surname) =

Daly is an Irish surname, derived from the Gaelic Ó Dálaigh. Notable people with the surname include:

== Entertainment and arts ==
- Andy Daly (born 1971), American actor, writer, and comedian
- Augustin Daly (1838–1899), American theatrical manager and playwright
- Candice Daly (1963–2004), American actress
- Carson Daly, television personality
- Dan Daly (1864–1904), American comic actor
- Eileen Daly, English actress and singer
- Gary Daly, English songwriter and vocalist
- James Daly (actor) (1918–1978), American actor
- Joel Daly (1934–2020), American news anchor and journalist
- John Charles Daly (1914–1991), American journalist game show host and radio personality
- Mark Daly, British actor
- Mike Daly, American alt-country and rock and roll singer/songwriter
- Norman Daly (1911–2008), American artist
- Peter-Hugo Daly, actor and drummer
- Richard Daly (1758–1813), Irish actor and theatre manager
- Scott Daly (born 1994), American football player
- Tess Daly (born 1969), English television presenter
- Tim Daly, American theatre, screen and voice actor, director and producer
- Tyne Daly, American actress
- William Merrigan Daly (1887–1936), known as "Bill Daly", Broadway songwriter and conductor

== Sports ==
- Aidan Daly, New Zealand basketball player
- Aisling Daly (born 1987), Irish mixed martial arts fighter
- Anthony Daly (hurler), Irish
- Bill Daly, Canadian deputy commissioner of hockey
- Charles Dudley Daly, West Point coach, founder of AFCA
- Chuck Daly (1930–2009), American basketball head coach
- Derek Daly, Irish racing driver
- Elliot Daly, (born 1992), English rugby player
- Fred Daly (golfer) (1911–1990), Northern Irish golfer
- Gerry Daly, Irish football player
- Jason Daly, Westmeath Gaelic footballer
- Joe Daly (footballer), English footballer
- John Daly (athlete), Irish steeplechase athlete
- John Daly (golfer), professional golfer
- Jon Daly (footballer), Irish association football player
- Keevil Daly (1923–2011), Guyanese-Canadian weightlifter
- Matt Daly (born 1989), Scottish professional wrestler
- Matt Daley (born 1983), English field hockey player
- Matty Daly (born 2001), English football player
- Rachel Daly (born 1991), English association football player
- Robert Daly, Irish sprinter
- Tom Daly (1891–1946), Canadian baseball player
- Wes Daly, English football player

== Politics and government ==
- Anthony Daly, Irish agrarian agitator
- Brendan Daly (politician) (1940–2023), Irish Fianna Fáil Party politician
- Chris Daly, American politician, San Francisco, California
- Clare Daly, Irish socialist politician and trade union activist
- Denis Daly (1747–1792), Irish landowner and politician
- Dominick Daly (1798–1868), British Governor of Prince Edward Island, Tobago and South Australia
- Edward Daly (Irish revolutionary) (1891–1916), Irish nationalist
- Edward Daly (mayor) (1926–1993), councillor and mayor of Newham, London
- Fred Daly (politician) (1913–1995), Australian Labor Party politician
- James Daly (activist) (1838–1910) Irish nationalist activist
- James Daly, 1st Baron Dunsandle and Clanconal (1782–1847), Irish baron and politician
- J. Burrwood Daly (1872–1939), US congressman
- John Daly (Fenian) (1845–1916), Irish nationalist
- John Corry Wilson Daly (1796–1878), Canadian politician, businessperson and militia officer
- John Lawrence Daly (1943–2004), self-declared "greenhouse skeptic"
- Lawrence Joseph Sarsfield Daly (1912–1979), fringe American politician
- Malachy Bowes Daly (1836–1920), Canadian politician
- Margaret Daly, served in the European Parliament
- Mark Daly (born 1973), Irish politician
- Martin Daly (born 1962), Irish Fianna Fáil politician
- Teresa Daly, American politician
- Thomas Mayne Daly Sr. (1827–1885), Canadian businessman and political figure
- Thomas Mayne Daly (1852–1911), Canadian politician
- William Davis Daly (1851–1900), American Democratic Party politician who represented New Jersey
- Will H. Daly (1869–1924), American labor leader, progressive politician and businessman

== Journalism and literature ==
- Brian Daly, Irish news journalist
- James Daly (journalist), American journalist in San Francisco
- John Daly (journalist), American newspaper and television journalist
- Maureen Daly (1921–2006), American novelist
- Wally K. Daly, English writer for television and radio

== Academics and science ==
- Herman Daly, ecological economist and professor
- John W. Daly (1933–2008), American biochemist
- Marie Maynard Daly, American biochemist
- Martin Daly, Canadian psychology professor
- Mary Daly (sociologist), Irish sociologist and academic
- Mary E. Daly, Irish historian
- Reginald Aldworth Daly (1871–1957), Canadian geologist
- Richard Daly, known for the Daly detector, a type of mass spectrometry detector
- Samantha Daly, American mechanical engineer

== Religion ==
- Cahal Daly (1917–2009), Irish Cardinal Archbishop of Armagh
- Edward Daly (bishop) (1933–2016), Irish religious leader
- Edward Celestin Daly (1894–1964), Roman Catholic Bishop of Des Moines, Iowa, 1948–1964
- James Joseph Daly (1921–2013), American Roman Catholic bishop
- Mary Daly, radical feminist and theologian

== Other ==
- Bernard Daly (1858–1920), Pioneer doctor and Oregon politician
- Charlie Daly (1896–1923) executed Irish Republican
- Daniel Daly (1873–1937), US Marine, Double Medal of Honor recipient
- Ed Daly, American entrepreneur behind World Airways
- Edward C. Daly (1914–1941), United States Navy sailor
- Edward M. Daly, U.S. Army General
- Henry Daly (1823–1895), British Army officer
- Ida Daly (1901–1985), American disability community leader
- James Daly (mutineer), British Army mutineer
- John Daly (outlaw) (1839–1864), American western outlaw
- John Donald Daly (1840–1923), California businessman and landowner
- Jordan Daly, Scottish campaigner and charity co-founder
- Marcus Daly (1841–1900), Irish-born American copper-mining businessman
- Paddy Daly, soldier in the Irish Republican Army
- Rowan Daly (1898–1924), British soldier
- Seamus Daly, Irish Republican
- Thomas Aquinas Daly, American contemporary landscape and still-life painter

== Fictional Characters ==
- Bill Daly, character in the television show Manifest

== See also ==
- Ó Dálaigh, history of the name
