= Cú Connacht Ua Dálaigh =

Gaelic poet

Cú Connacht Ua Dálaigh, (a.k.a. Cu Chonnacht na Sgoile, "Cu Connacht of the school"), died 1139.

== Overview ==
Cú Connacht was a member of the Ó Dálaigh bardic family, originally from County Westmeath. Branches of the family would settle in all four provinces of Ireland. His is the earliest recorded use of the name Ó Dálaigh.

Cú Connacht died at the monastery of Clonard in 1139. The Irish annals accord him "The first ollamh of poetry in all Ireland." It further states that He was of Leacain in Mide.

== Family Tree ==
In the introduction to The Tribes of Ireland by Aonghus Ruadh na nAor Ó Dálaigh, the editors give the following family tree.

 Adhamh, a quo Corca Adhamh of County Westmeath
 |
 |
 Corc
 |
 |
 Fachtna
 |
 |
 Dalach, a quo Ua Dálaigh
 |
 |
 Gilla Coimhdheadh
 |
 |
 Tadhg ua Dálaigh
 |
 |
 Muireadhach Ua Dálaigh
 |
 |
 Dalach Ua Dálaigh
 |
 |
 Cú Connacht Ua Dálaigh, died 1139.
 |
 |
 Tadhg Doichleach Ua Dálaigh, died 1181.
 |
 |
 Aonghus Ó Dálaigh, the common ancestor of all the O'Dalys extant
 |
 |_______________________________________________________________________________________________
 |                   |                    |                        |                |           |
 |                   |                    |                        |                |           |
 Cearbhall Fionn  Donnchadh Mor   Cormac na Casbhairne   Muireadhach Albanach  Gilla na Naemh  Tadhg
 |                   |                                                            (issue)       |
 |                   |                                                                          |
 |                   |                                                                          |
Ua Dálaigh Fionn   Ua Dálaigh                                                              Ua Dálaigh
of Duhallow        of Finvarra                                                             of Breifne
Co. Cork.          Co. Clare
                   and Dunsandle
                   Co. Galway

Preceded by Cú Collchaille Ua Baígilláin	Chief Ollam of Ireland; 1119–1139	Succeeded by Gillamaire Ua Conallta

== See also ==
- Máel Íosa Ua Dálaigh, died 1185
- Donnchadh Mór Ó Dálaigh, died 1244
- Muireadhach Albanach, alive 1228
- Gofraidh Fionn Ó Dálaigh, died 1387
- Aonghus Fionn Ó Dálaigh, died 1570
- Lochlann Óg Ó Dálaigh, fl. c. 1610
- Cearbhall Óg Ó Dálaigh, fl. 1630
