= Uallach =

Uallach was a rare Irish language feminine given name used during the medieval period.

== People ==
- Uallach ingen Muinecháin, poet and Chief Ollam of Ireland, died 934.

== See also ==
- List of Irish-language given names
