= Joe Daly =

Joe Daly may refer to:

- Joe Daly (comics) (born 1979), South African comics artist
- Joe Daly (baseball) (1868–1943), American baseball player
- Joe Daly (footballer) (1897–1941), English footballer

== See also ==
- Joe Daley (disambiguation)
