= Aonghus Ó Dálaigh =

Irish poet

Aonghus Ó Dálaigh (fl. c. 1200) was an Irish poet.

Aonghus was a grandson of Cú Connacht Ua Dálaigh (died 1139) and said to be the common ancestor of all the O'Dalys extant. He is recorded as having six sons:

- 1 - Cearbhall Fionn Ó Dálaigh - ancestor of Ó Dálaigh Fionn, poet to Ó Caoimh of Duhallow, County Cork
- 2 - Donnchadh Mór Ó Dálaigh - ancestor to Ó Dálaigh of County Clare and County Galway
- 3 - Cormac na Casbhairne Ó Dálaigh
- 4 - Muireadhach Albanach - crusader poet of Lissadill, County Sligo
- 5 - Gilla na Naemh Ó Dálaigh
- 6 - Tadhg Ó Dálaigh - ancestor of Ó Dálaigh of Breifne and Connacht

No obit of Aonghus is known to exist in any of the Irish annals.

== See also ==
- MacMhuirich bardic family
