= Somhairle Mac Domhnail =

Soldier for the Gaelic Cause

Somhairle Mac Domhnaill (c. 1580 – c. 1632), called by English speakers Sorley McDonnell, was a renowned soldier for the Gaelic cause in Ireland and Scotland during the Thirty Years War and the patron who commissioned two 17th-century manuscript collections of poems, Duanaire Finn and The Book of O'Connor Donn.

== Early life ==
Mac Domhnaill was born in the Glens of County Antrim about the year 1580 to Séamas Mac Domhnaill of Dunluce, son of the renowned Sorley Boy MacDonnell) and Máire Ní Néill of the Clandeboy O'Neills. The English conquest of 1601 ended any hopes of Somhairle's to succeed to his father's lands.

== Rebel ==
He was party to the Irish rebel conspiracy of 1615. When the rebellion fell through he escaped to Scotland to take part in a MacDonald rising. In the space of a few months he overturned Campbell control of hereditary MacDonald lands in Islay, Jura, Colonsay and Kintyre, but fled to Ireland when Archibald Campbell, 7th Earl of Argyll, led an army against them.

In 1616 he captured a ship in Larne and continued the fight in the Inner Hebrides. He then captured a French ship and sailed to Dunkirk in the Spanish Netherlands with a band of Scotsmen to engage in the Spanish army.

As a result of French and English protest to the Spanish government in the Netherlands, Mac Domhnail and his men had to seek asylum in an abbey in Dunkirk. After intervention by Ó Néill and Ó Domhnaill they were allowed their freedom.

== Soldier ==
As a captain in the Spanish army, Mac Domhnail was commissioned to raise a company of musketeers in Flanders. He took part in the Bohemian campaign in the Thirty Years War and fought at the head of his company in the Verdugo regiment in the Battle of White Mountain, 1620.

He returned to the Netherlands in 1624 and spent some time in the garrison of Ostend, with the Franciscan priest Brian Mac Giolla Coinnigh as chaplain to his company He is believed to have spent his final years in penury in the Irish College of St Anthony in Leuven, where he died about 1632.

Some years later, Mac Domhnail's son, Séamas mac Somhairle Mac Donmhnaill, served as lieutenant to his kinsman, Alastair mac Colla Chiotaigh Mac Domhnaill (Alasdair Mac Colla), in Scotland (1644–45), and in Ireland afterwards, before serving in the Spanish army in the Netherlands.

== Patron of the Arts ==
In the period spent in Ostend he commissioned the writing of two manuscripts, a collection of Fenian Lays, Duanaire Finn, and a collection of bardic poetry, The Book of O'Connor Donn. The collection of Lays in Duanaire Finn, written by the scribe and soldier Aodh Ó Dochartaigh in 1627, was published by Dr Eoin Mac Néill and Gerard Murphy in three volumes between 1908 and 1953. Both books were bequeathed by Mac Domhnail to the Irish College in Leuven.

== In literature ==
Mac Domhnaill is depicted as an historical character in Darach Ó Scolaí' novel An Cléireach.
