= Giolla Ernain Ó Martain =

Giolla Ernain Ó Martain, Irish poet and Chief Ollam of Ireland, died in 1218.

== Overview ==
The most detailed reference to Ó Martain occurs in the Annals of Loch Cé, which gives his obituary under the year 1218: "Gill Aernáin .H. Martain, ollamh Erenn, & sói il-dánachta, iar cinnedh a bhetha ag na manchaibh, in pace quieuit."/"Gilla-Ernain O'Martain, chief poet of Erinn, and professor of many arts, after spending his life with the monks, in pace quievit."

The Annals of Ulster, sub anno 1217, state "Gilla Arnain h-Ua Martain, ollum Erenn i m-breitheamhnacht, mortuus est"/"Gilla-Arnain Ua Martain, ollam of Ireland in jurisprudence, died."

A family of the name were of the Soghain people, and natives of the kingdom of Ui Maine.

Preceded by Máel Íosa Ó Dálaigh	Chief Ollam of Ireland ?–1218	Succeeded by Gofraidh Fionn Ó Dálaigh
