= Maoilsheachlainn Óg Ó Dálaigh =

16th-century Irish language poet

Maoilsheachlainn Óg Ó Dálaigh (died 1578) was a 16th-century Irish language poet, from the bardic Ó Dálaigh family, who served Gerald Fitzgerald, the 14th Earl of Desmond as his court poet. Due to this position, which he had inherited from his father Maoilsheachlainn Mac Donnchadh Ó Dálaigh, he was provided with land in Kilsarkan, County Kerry. While none of his works survive, he is mentioned in the Franciscan poet Eoghan Ó Dubhthaigh's vituperative satire Leig dod' choimh-meas dúinn, which was composed shortly after his death. While Ó Dubhthaigh writes critically about several poets for them being overly dedicated to wordly poetic concerns; however, he exempts Ó Dálaigh from this criticism. Ó Dálaigh was the father of the poets Conchubhar Ó Dálaigh and Cú Chonnacht Ó Dálaigh, as well as the grandfather of Daniel O'Daly.
