= Mael Isa ua Máilgiric =

Mael Isa ua Máilgiric, Irish poet, died 1088.

Mael Isa ua Máilgiric who held the post of Chief Ollam of Ireland and died at Clonmacnoise in 1088. His obit is given in the Annals of the Four Masters as follows- "M1088.4 Maelisa Ua Maelgiric, chief poet and chief Ollamh, died."

Preceded by Cellach húa Rúanada	Chief Ollam of Ireland; 1079–1088	Succeeded by Cú Collchaille Ua Baígilláin
