= Cellach húa Rúanada =

Cellach húa Rúanada, Irish poet, died 1079.

Cellachy held the post of Chief Ollam of Ireland and died in 1079. His obit is given in the Annals of the Four Masters as follows- "M1079.4 Ceallach Ua Ruanadha, chief poet of Ireland in his time, died."

His obituary is given in the Annals of Ulster as follows- "U1079.1 Cellach ua Ruanada, chief ollav of Ireland, rested in peace."

His obituary is given in the Chronicon Scotorum as follows- "Annal CS1079 Kalends. Cellach ua Ruanadha, ollamh of Ireland, dies."

An Irish clavis or metrical tract has been preserved in the Book of Leinster as well as in the eighteenth-century manuscript Trinity College H 1 15, where it was copied from a fourteenth-century exemplar that seems now to be lost. Rudolf Thurneysen incorporated this poem in his Mittelirische Verslehren as Verslehre IV. In the Book of Leinster it was ascribed to a certain Cellach .h. Ruan, who may be identical with Cellach hua Ruanada.

Preceded by Flaithem Mac Mael Gaimrid	Chief Ollam of Ireland; 1058–1079	Succeeded by Mael Isa ua Máilgiric
