= Bean Torrach, fa Tuar Broide =

Poem

"Bean Torrach, fa Tuar Broide", also known as "A Child Born in Prison", is a 14th-century Early Modern Irish poem by Gofraidh Fionn Ó Dálaigh.

== Text (extract) ==
The following are the first three verses of the poem, followed by an English translation.

Bean torrach, fa tuar broide,
do bhí i bpríosún pheannaide,
berar dho chead Dé na ndúl,
lé leanabh beag sa bhríosún.

Ar n-a bhreith do bhí an macámh
ag fás mar gach bhfochlocán,
dá fhiadhnaibh mar budh each dhún,
seal do bhliadhnaibh sa bhríosun.

An inghean d’fhagháil bhroise —
meanma an leinbh níor lughaide,
sí dhá réir gé dho bhaoi i mbroid,
mar mhnaoi gan phéin gan pheannaid

Translation

A pregnant woman (sorrow’s sign)
once there was, in painful prison.
The God of Elements let her bear
in prison there a little child.

The little boy, when he was born,
grew up like any other child
(plain as we could see him there)
for a space of years, in prison.

That the woman was a prisoner
did not lower the baby’s spirits.
She minded him, though in prison,
like one without punishment or pain.
