= Center Park =

Building complex in Seattle, Washington, United States

Coordinates: 47°35′03″N 122°17′58″W

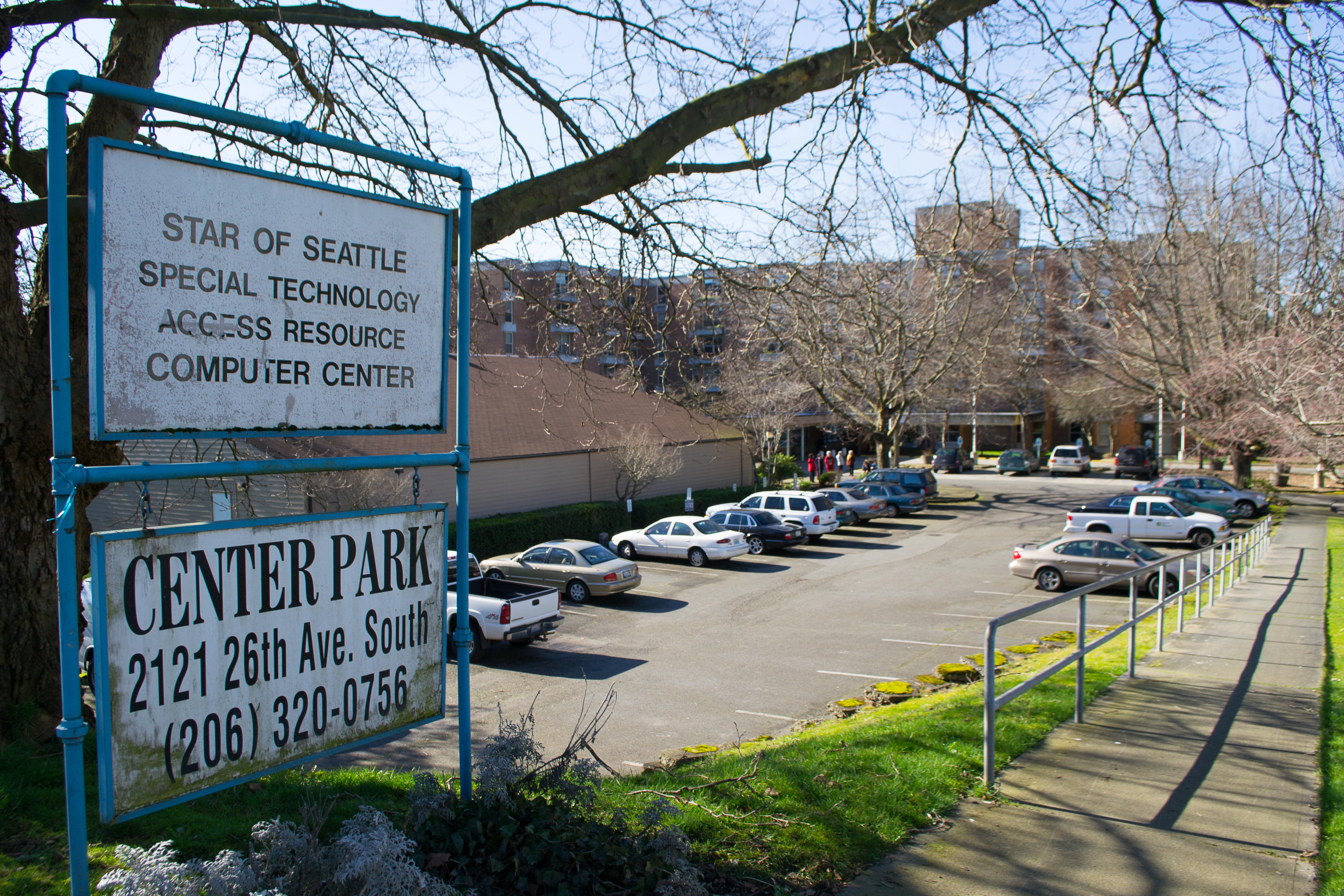
Center Park, Seattle

Center Park, located at 2121 26th Avenue South, is a subsidized mid-rise building complex located in the Mt. Baker neighborhood of Seattle, Washington, designed to provide living accommodation to physically or mentally challenged individuals and their caretakers. The apartments were built in the 1960s by Ida May Daly, a progressive woman with severe muscular dystrophy. She purchased an area of inexpensive land in the Rainier Valley neighborhood in south Seattle. Center Park is now managed and maintained by the Department of Housing and Urban Development and the Seattle Housing Authority.

== Amenities ==
Center Park is a seven-story building, composed primarily of cinder block. The building has a multi-purpose recreation room that operates as a hub for local events and is also able to function as a voting station. Another notable area frequented by the building's residents is the stone garden in a cove near the building. Center Park has over 100 independent living units, an office to assist those who find difficulty completing their day-to-day activities, and a free meals program (offering three meals per day in the cafeteria and accessible to those of low-income). Neighborhood buses also run fairly frequently throughout the area. Center Park is one of the few buildings that is almost completely wheelchair-accessible.

One issue faced by Center Park is the lengthy waiting list of potential residents. There are a large number of disadvantaged people in the area who are currently seeking assistance. This situation has led to a debate over the question of building additional living structures for the disadvantaged.

== Center Park activism ==
During the late 1970s and early 1980s, several of the disabled people who lived at Center Park banded together in an attempt to get better wheelchair lifts installed on Seattle's Metro buses. These activists pointed out that for the nearly immobile, wheelchairs and accessible city buses were a route to better mobility, social integration, and access to better lives, work and recreation of their own choosing without complete dependence on the able-bodied. They pointed out ways in which the existing lifts could be altered and improved, deliberately misused the "folding camel" lifts in order to illustrate how easily they could be broken, and otherwise rode the old lifts in order to break them. Eventually, the Metro buses were retrofitted with better chair lifts.
