= Clothna mac Aenghusa =

Irish poet

Clothna mac Aenghusa, Irish poet, died 1008.

Clothna held the post of Chief Ollam of Ireland. Some of his poems are held in the Library of Trinity College Dublin. His obit is given in the Annals of the Four Masters as follows- “M1008.11 Clothna, son of Aenghus, chief poet of Ireland in his time, died.”

His obit is given in the Annals of Ulster as follows- “U1009.10 Clothgna son of Aengus, chief poet of Ireland, dies.” His obit is given in the Chronicon Scotorum as follows- "Annal CS1009 Kalends. Clothna son of Óengus, chief poet of Ireland, dies.”

His appellation appears to be a patronymic, not a surname.

| Preceded by Urard Mac Coise | Chief Ollam of Ireland; 990–1008 | Succeeded by Muircheartach mac Cu Ceartach Mac Liag |
