= Flann mac Lonáin =

Irish poet

Flann mac Lonáin (died 896) was an Irish poet.

== Background and career ==
Flann mac Lonáin was a famed and at times controversial poet. He was the Chief Ollam of Ireland He seems to have been born in the east Clare/west Tipperary region. Distinguished both in his lifetime and after, his compositions were studied and used as exemplars in medieval metrical tracts.

== Annalistic verse ==
The Annals of the Four Masters contains two verses of a lament he composed upon the death of Treasach, son of Becan, chief of Ui Bairche Maighe, [who]was slain by Aedh, son of Ilguine in 884:

Of him Flann, son of Lonan, said:

- A heavy mist upon the province of Breasal/since they slew at the fortaliced Liphe/Heavy the groans of Assal/for grief at the loss of Treasach.
- Wearied my mind, moist my countenance/since Treasach lies in death./The moan of Oenach Lifi all/and of Leinster to the sea, is the son of Becan.

Upon the death of Ceallach mac Flannaghan, King of Brega in 890, he composed the following:

- Illustrious the careers/of the three sons of Flann/who coursed over Odhbha/Congalach of Colt/Ceallach of Cearna/and Cinaedh of Cnodhbha.
- Though Ceallach slew/an outlaw, pity/he should fall in the battle's onset;/Alas!/his danger was certain;/ that he would not spend/the life of a historian.

== Death ==
He died violently at Waterford Harbour.

The Annals of the Four Masters state that:

M891.14 Flann mac Lonáin, Uirghil Shil Scota primh-fhileGaoidheal uile, file as deach baí i n-Erinn ina aimsir, do mharbhadhla macaibh Cuirbhuidhe, do Uibh Fothaith iat-sen, h-in-duinetaidhe h-ic Loch Dá Caochi n-Deisibh Mumhán.

M891.14 Flann, son of Lonan, the Virgil of the race of Scota, chief poet of all the Gaeidhil, the best poet that was in Ireland in his time, was secretly murdered by the sons of Corrbuidhe (who were of the Ui Fothaith), at Loch Dachaech, in Deisi Mumhan.

The Annals of Ulster state that:

- 896 AD Flann son of Lónán grandson of Guaire, was slain by the Déisi of Mumu.

while the Annals of Innisfallen notes;

- The slaying of Flann son of Lonán, king of the poets of Ireland, by the Uí Fhothaid Tíre.

while the Chronicon Scotorum more fulsomely records that;

- Flann son of Lónán, the Virgil of the Irish i.e. the chief poet of the Irish, was slain by the Uí Cuirrbuidh i.e. by the Uí Fothaid, at Loch dá Caoch in the Déisi of Mumu.

In his posthumously-published work, The Irish Tradition (1946), Robin Flower wrote at some length of him and the legends surrounding his life.

Flann is mentioned in the oldest surviving personal letter from Ireland, which dates from the mid 12th century and was addressed to Áed Ua Crimthainn, compiler of the Book of Leinster, by Find, Bishop of Kildare, who wrote: "Let the poem book of Mac Lonáin be brought to me so that we may study the meanings of the poems that are in it, et vale in Christo.

== Notes ==
| Preceded by Máel Muire Othain | Chief Ollam of Ireland; 887–896 | Succeeded by Torpaid mac Taicthech |
