= Joe Daley =

Joe Daley may refer to:

- Joe Daley (ice hockey) (born 1943), ice hockey goaltender
- Joe Daley (golfer) (born 1960), American golfer
- Joe Daley (musician) (1918–1994), American jazz tenor saxophonist, composer, and music teacher

== See also ==
- Joseph Daley (disambiguation)
- Joe Daly (disambiguation)
- Joe Dale (1921–2000), English footballer
