= An Cléireach =

2007 book by Darach Ó Scolaí

An Cléireach (Gaelic: The Clerk) is a novel by the Irish writer Darach Ó Scolaí, published in 2007 and winner of the 2007 Oireachtas Prize for Literature. It also won Gradam Uí Shúilleabháin (Irish Language Book of the Year) in 2008.

== Plot ==
Set during the Cromwellian conquest of Ireland, the book centres on the protagonist and narrator, a soldier and clerk in dispute with his colonel over a promotion. In north Munster in the year 1650, as the remnants of the royalist army flee from the victorious parliamentarians, a band of poets and soldier-scribes are brought together and, regardless of the proximity of the enemy, spend the night storytelling.

In the stories recounted by Cearbhall Óg Ó Dálaigh, Toirdhealbhach Carach Ó Conchubhair and Fear Flatha Ó Gnímh, another theme surfaces in the novel, the story of a young man who has been entrusted with the safekeeping of an ancient psalter that has been in his family's keeping for three hundred years, and who has to flee abroad with the book as the Tudor conquest of Ireland is completed by 1601.

His hereditary responsibility brings him to the Spanish Netherlands, to Bohemia where he takes part in the Battle of White Mountain as a musketeer in captain Somhairle Mac Domhnaill's company, and from there to the Irish College of St Anthony in Leuven (Louvain), in the company of Brother Mícheál Ó Cléirigh and Father Brian Mac Giolla Coinnigh, and finally back to Ireland during the wars of the Irish Catholic Confederation and the Cromwellian conquest of Ireland.

And although the dispute between the narrator and the colonel is brought to a head that night in Ireland, the final strands of the novel are brought together in 1667 as the narrator lives in exile in the Spanish Netherlands.

== Reception ==
Tadhg Dubh Ó Cróinín in The Limerick Leader emphasizes the credibility and verisimilitude of the writing that succeeds in convincing the reader that at all times he is in the centre of the vortex no matter where the action takes him. Philip Cummings in Lá Nua reads the novel as a contemporary fiction, drawing attention to the author's tricks and modern conscious narrative.
