= Máel Muire Othain =

Irish poet

Máel Muire Othain (died 887) was an Irish poet.

== Life ==
Máel Muire Othain held the post of Chief Ollam of Ireland. He died in 887 A.D. His nickname ‘Othna’, referred to him being a member of the monastery of Othain at Fahan, County Donegal. He was amongst the early poets and historians who produced various parts of Lebor Gabála Érenn. Edward O'Reilly gives a full account of Máel Muru's works in his Irish Writers, LXXXII sq.; d. anno 884.

== Death ==
His obit is given in the Annals of Ulster as follows:– "U887.5 Mael Muru, chief poet of Ireland, died.

1. The choice earth has not covered,
To Temair's multitudes there shall not come,
Ireland of the great territories(?) shall not contain
A man like the pure and gentle Mael Muru.
2. There has never tasted death fearlessly,
Nor reached the known dead,
The cultivator's soil has never covered
A more wonderful keeper of tradition."

His obit is given in the Chronicon Scotorum as follows:– "Annal CS887 Kalends. Mael Muire, the learned poet of the Irish, rested."

His obit is given in the Annals of the Four Masters as follows:– "M884.12 Maelmura, the learned and truly intelligent poet, the erudite historian of the Scotic language, died. It is of him this testimony was given:

1. There trod not the charming earth,
there never flourished at affluent Teamhair,
The great and fertile Ireland never produced
a man like the mild fine Maelmura.
2. There sipped not death without sorrow,
there mixed not a nobler face with the dead,
The habitable earth was not closed
over a historian more illustrious."

Preceded by Senchán Torpéist	Chief Ollam of Ireland ?–887	Succeeded by Flann mac Lonáin
