= Uallach ingen Muinecháin =

Irish poet

Uallach ingen Muinechain (died 934) was an Irish poet and Chief Ollam of Ireland.

Uallach was of the Corca Dhuibhne of County Kerry, described as a banfhile Herend/woman-poet of Ireland in her obituary in the Annals of Innisfallen. Women poets are notable by their near-total absence from Gaelic sources, and nothing is known of Uallach or her work.

Preceded by Bard Boinne	Chief Ollam of Ireland; 931–934	Succeeded by Cormacan Eigeas
