= Cormac mhac Taidhg Bhallaigh Ó Dálaigh =

Irish poet

Cormac Mhac Taidhg Bhallaigh Ó Dálaigh, Irish poet, fl. 1200–1600.

== Overview ==
A member of the Ó Dálaigh family of professional poets, Cormac's floruit is uncertain, and can only be assigned to the High and Late Medieval Era in Ireland.

His principal surviving poem, Mairg théid tar toil a athar, consists of one hundred and twenty four lines. It survives in Trinity College Dublin Library's MS 1340, 26 (alias H. 3. 19). Lambert McKenna published an untranslated version in 1938.

== Opening verse ==
- Mairg théid tar toil a athar/ar a ghoin gidh bé as bhreitheamh;/eagail a fhearg uan d'fhiochadh/criothar dhearg fan buan beithear.
