= Muircheartach mac Con Ceartaich Mac Liag =

Irish poet

Muircheartach mac Con Ceartaich Mac Liag, a.k.a. Muircheartach Beag, Irish poet, died 1015.

MacLiag was Chief Ollam of Ireland. He was a native of South Connacht and died in 1015. He was the chief poet and secretary of King Brian Boru. He is supposedly the source of the history of Brian Boru called Cogad Gáedel re Gallaib (English: The War of the Irish with the Foreigners).

His obit is given in the Annals of the Four Masters as follows- "M1015.7 Macliag, i.e. Muircheartach, son of Cuceartach, chief poet of Ireland at that time, died. The following was Macliag's first quatrain: 1. Muircheartach Beag, son of Maelcertach, who has been herding the cows, It is more worthy that he retaliates not,—give him a handful of findraip (corn). His last quatrain was this: 1. O Bell, which art at the head of my pillow, to visit thee no friends come; Though thou makest thy ‘ding dang,’ it is by thee the salt is measured.". (This is a very early example of the phrase "ding dong" to describe the sound a bell makes. The Oxford English Dictionary only manages to trace the phrase back to the 15th century. They are currently investigating this quote from the annals with a view to amending their entry)

His obit is given in the Annals of Ulster as follows- "U1016.3 Mac Liag, chief ollav of Ireland, died."

His obit is given in the Annals of Loch Cé as follows- "LC1016.1 Mac Liag, chief poet of Erinn, mortuus est."

His obit is given in the Chronicon Scotorum as follows- "Annal CS1016 Kalends. Mac Liac i.e. Muirchertach, chief ollamh of Ireland, an excellent man, dies in Inis Gaill Duibh on the Sinna. Mac Liac's first verse: 1. Little Muircertach, son of Maelcertach, Who is wont to be herding the cows— He is the innocent who attempts not to wound; Give him a handful of finnraip.(corn)"

Preceded by Clothna mac Aenghusa	Chief Ollam of Ireland; 1008–1015	Succeeded by Cúán úa Lothcháin
