= Cormacan Eigeas =

Irish poet (died 946)

Cormacan Eigeas (died 946) was an Irish poet.

Cormacan Eigeas mac Maelbrighdhe was Chief Ollam of Ireland. Eigeas denoted 'the Learned'. He was chief poet to Muirchertach mac Néill, King of Ulster. He wrote a poem celebrating the king's tour of Ireland in 941–942, amongst others. Edward O'Reilly gives a full account of these in his Irish Writers, LXXXVI sq.; d. anno 941.

His obituary is given in the Annals of the Four Masters as follows:

M946.7 Cormacan, son of Maelbrighdhe, the chief poet, the play-mate of Niall Glundubh, died.

Preceded by Bard Boinne	Chief Ollam of Ireland; 946–975	Succeeded by Cinaedh Ua hArtagain
