= Gillebríghde Albanach =

Scottish poet and crusader

Gillebríghde Albanach (fl. 1200–1230) was a medieval Scottish poet and crusader. He took part, along with his fellow-Gael Muireadhach Albanach, in the Fifth Crusade, reaching Acre in 1218 or 1219, and following the main Crusader army via southern Cyprus to Damietta; He may have been on crusade until 1224 or after.

When not crusading, Gillebrìghde spent much, if not most, of this life working as a poet in Ireland. His panegyric poems are all dedicated to Irish patrons. We know he was Scottish, however, because of references to Scotland describing it as "duthchas damh", my dúthchas ("native place", "heritage", "birthright", etc.) and "dom thír", my country. About seven of his poems survive, five panegyric poems, and two crusading poems.

== Panegyrics ==
The surviving panegyrics were written for two Irish patrons, Donnchadh Cairbreach Ó Briain (d. 1242), King of Thomond; and Cathal Croibhdhearg Ó Conchubhair (d. 1224), King of Connaught.

- "Aisling ad-chonnarc ó chianaibh" ("A vision I saw some time ago") - Written for Donnchadh Cairbreach Ó Briain.
- "Fada Dhamh druim re hÉirinn" ("Long am I with my back towards Ireland") - Written for Cathal Croibhdhearg Ó Conchubhair.
- "Sgían mo charad ar mo chliú" ("My friend's knife at my left side") - Written for Donnchadh Cairbreach Ó Briain.
- "Tabhraid chugam cruit mo ríogh" ("Bring me my king's harp") - Written for Donnchadh Cairbreach Ó Briain.
- "Tháining an Craobhdhearg go Cruachan" ("The Red Hand has come to Cruachan") - Written for Cathal Croibhdhearg Ó Conchubhair.

== Crusading poems ==
- "A ghilli gabhus an stiúir" ("O Lad who takes the helm") -
- "A Mhuireadhaigh, meil do sgín ("Muireadhach, sharpen your knife")
