= Joseph Daley =

Joseph Daley may refer to:

- Joseph Daley (jazz musician) (1949–2025), American educator, jazz musician, composer and arranger
- Joseph Thomas Daley (1915–1983), US prelate
- Joseph Daley (musician) (1918–1994), on the 1974 jazz album Crystals
- Joseph Daley (New Hampshire first gentleman), husband of Governor Kelly Ayotte

== See also ==
- Joe Daley (disambiguation)
