= Tadhg Doichleach Ua Dálaigh =

Irish chief poet of Erinn and Alba (died 1181)

Tadhg Ua Dálaigh, Irish poet and Chief Ollam of Ireland, died 1181.

== Biography ==
A son of Cú Connacht Ua Dálaigh (died 1139) the Annals of Lough Ce say that he was the chief poet of Erinn and Alba (of Ireland and Scotland). He was one of the earliest members of the Ó Dálaigh clan of poets, and the second to be accorded the title of Ireland's chief poet. His son, Aonghus Ó Dálaigh is held to be the common ancestor of all the O'Daly's extant.

| Preceded by Gillamaire Ua Conallta | Chief Ollam of Ireland; 1166–1181 | Succeeded by Máel Íosa Ua Dálaigh |
