= Cináed ua hArtacáin =

Irish poet

Cináed ua hArtacáin (died 975) was an Irish Gaelic poet.

The chief poet of Leth Cuinn according to the Annals of Tigernach and the chief poet of all Ireland according to the Annals of Ulster, Cináed wrote dinsenchas pertaining to the Kingdom of Brega. Irish scholar Edward O'Reilly gives a full account of his works in his 'Irish Writers', LXXXVIII sq.; d. anno 975. A marginal note in the Annals of Ulster suggests he was one of the southern branch of the Uí Néill dynasty of Síl nÁedo Sláine. Apart from the year of his death (975), no further biographical facts are known about him.

His most ambitious poem was a list of the graves of prominent warriors entitled ‘Fianna bátar i nEmain’. He wrote a eulogy for the Brega king Congalach mac Mael Mithig (died 956). He also appears to have been patronised by the Viking king of Dublin Olaf Cuarán (Olaf Sihtricson).

Preceded by Cormacan Eigeas	Chief Ollam of Ireland; 946–975	Succeeded by Eochaidh Ua Floinn
