= Gillamaire Ua Conallta =

Irish poet (died 1166)

Gillamaire Dall Ua Conallta, Irish poet and Chief Ollam of Ireland, died 1166.

== Biography ==
His obit is given in the Annals of the Four Masters as follows- "M1166.18 The blind Ua Conallta, i.e. Gillamaire, royal poet of Ireland, died; he was of the tribe of Ui-Briuin."

Preceded by Cú Connacht Ó Dálaigh	Chief Ollam of Ireland; 1139–1166	Succeeded by Tadhg Ua Dálaigh
