= Cú Collchaille Ua Baígilláin =

Irish poet

Cú Collchaille Ua Baígilláin (died 1119) was an Irish poet.

Ua Baigheallain who held the post of Chief Ollam of Ireland and died in 1119 AD. His obit is given in the Annals of the Four Masters as follows- "M1119.10 Cucollchoille Ua Baigheallain, chief ollamh of Ireland in poetry, a man distinguished for charity, hospitality, and universal benevolence towards the needy and the mighty, was killed by the men of Lurg and Tuath-ratha (Barony of Lurg and Tooragh, County Fermanagh), with his wife and two very good sons, and also five-and-thirty other persons, consisting both of his family and guests, in one house, on the Saturday before Little Easter, being the festival of Becan, son of Cula."

His obit is given in the Annals of Ulster as follows- "U1119.3 Cú Collchaille ua Baighellán, chief ollav of Ireland in poetry, alms, honour and general compassion to weak and strong, was killed by the men of Lurg and Tuath Rátha, with his wife and two sufficiently good sons, and with thirty-five others, both household and guests, in one house on Low Saturday 5 April, the feast of Bácán son of Cula."

His obit is given in the Chronicon Scotorum as follows- "Annal CS1119 Kalends. Ua Baígilláin, royal poet of Ireland, was killed by the Tuath Rátha, by Spaillech Ó Flannagáin."

His obit is given in the Annals of Inisfallen as follows- "AI1119.2 The violent death of the poet Ua Baígelláin together with his two sons, his wife, and his train. The curse of God on those who did the deed!".

His obit is given in the Annals of Tigernach as follows- "T1118.9 Hua Baigellain, chief poet of Ireland, was killed by the Spaillech Hua Flanducain, after his house had been stormed."

His obit is given in the Annals of Loch Cé as follows- "LC1119.3 Cúchollchaille O'Baighelláin, chief ollamh of Erinn in poetry, and a man distinguished for charity and hospitality, and for universal benevolence towards the needy and the powerful, was slain by the Feara-Luirg and Tuath-ratha, cum sua uxore et duobus filiis suis bonis, et cum xxxv. aliis, consisting both of his family and guests, in the same house, the Saturday before Little Easter, on the festival of Becan, son of Cula."

Preceded by Mael Isa ua Máilgiric	Chief Ollam of Ireland; 1088–1119	Succeeded by Cú Connacht Ó Dálaigh
