= Adna mac Uthidir =

Irish poet

Adna mac Uthidir, Irish poet, fl. 1st-century AD.

Adna mac Uthidir held the post of Chief Ollam of Ireland during the reign of King Conchobar mac Nessa. He lived c. 1 AD. Edward O'Reilly mentions him in his Chronological Account of Irish Writers. Fragments of laws attributed to Adna are to be found in the library of Trinity College. The sages Adhna, Forchern, and Atharne are said to have been the first to collect the axioms of Irish law into one volume. Some sources say he was Chief Poet of Ulster as well as Ireland. An old Irish tale "Immacallam in dá Thuarad" or 'The Colloquy of the Two Sages' tells of his death.

Preceded by Lugh	Chief Ollam of Ireland c. 1st century AD	Succeeded by Dubhthach moccu Lughair
