= Alan Titley =

Writer, translator and professor working primarily in Irish

Professor Emeritus Alan Titley MRIA
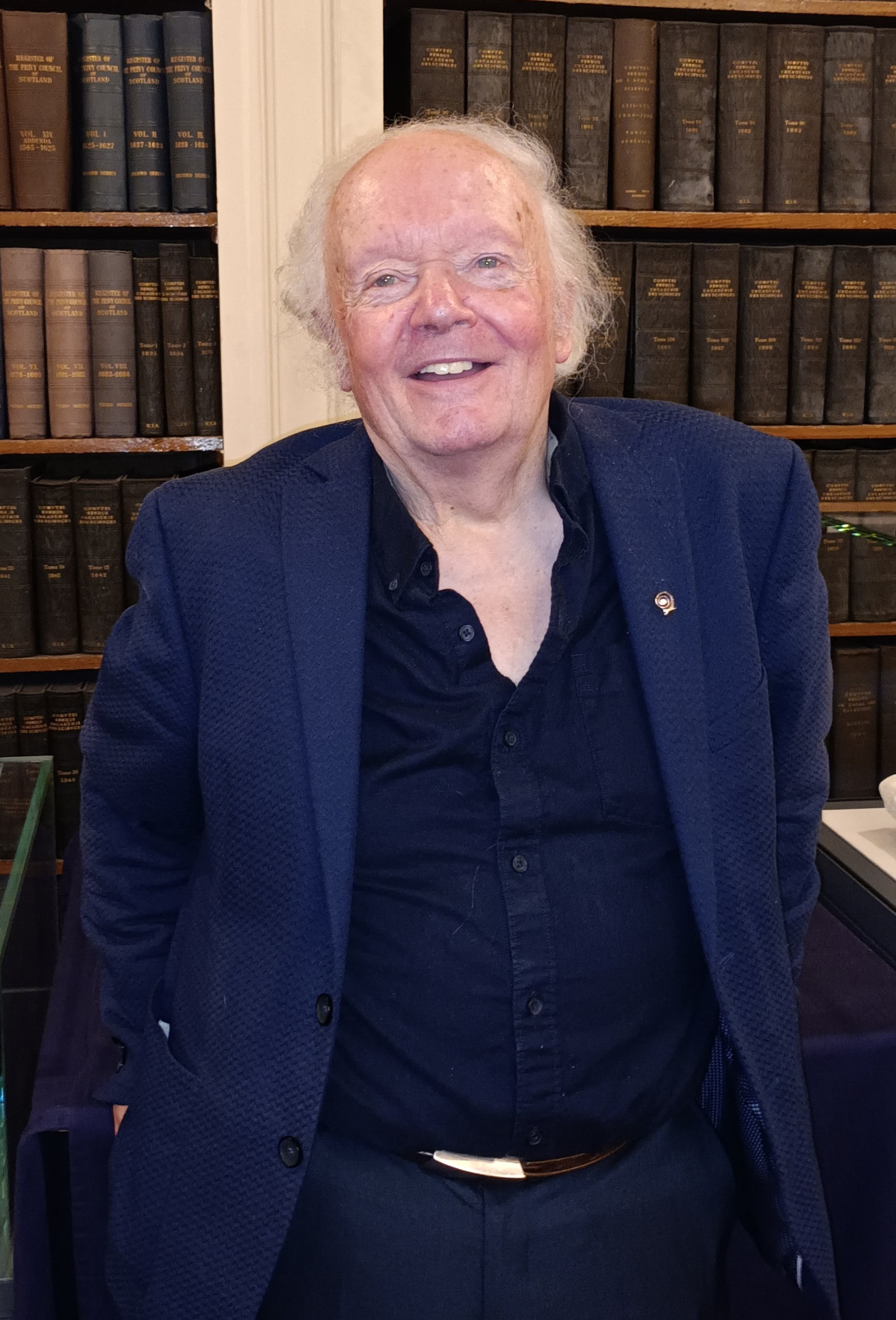
- Titley in 2025
- Born: 28 June 1947 (age 79); Cork, Ireland
- Writing career
- Language: Irish
- Years active: 1966–present

Alan Titley MRIA (Irish: An Titlíoch; born 28 June 1947) is an Irish-language novelist, translator, playwright, and scholar. His 2014 poem "An Bhean Feasa" is the longest poem in modern Irish literature. He also writes a column under the name Crobhingne.

== Early life and education ==
Alan Titley was born on 28 June 1947 in Cork, Ireland.

He was educated at Coláiste Chríost Rí, St Patrick's College, Dublin, and University College Dublin.

== Career ==
=== Writing ===
Titley writes in both English and the Irish language. He is known for writing novels, and for translating stories from Irish into English.

Titley has written widely on Irish, Anglo-Irish, and Scottish literature, and his work about the Irish novel, titled An tÚrscéal Gaeilge is highly regarded. His 2014 poem "An Bhean Feasa" is the longest poem in modern Irish literature.

He also writes a column in The Irish Times under the name Crobhingne.

He taught in Nigeria during the Biafra War. Later he was head of the Irish Department in Drumcondra from 1981. In 2003 he began to write a column in The Irish Times. In 2006 he was appointed Professor of Modern Irish in University College Cork. He retired in 2011. Titley was elected to the Royal Irish Academy in 2012.

=== Academia ===
As of 2006 he was head of the Irish Department at St Patrick's College in Dublin. Sometime around 2018-9 he was appointed professor of modern Irish at the University College Cork.

== Recognition and awards ==
Titley is a member of the Royal Irish Academy.

He has won many awards, including the Butler Prize of the Irish American Cultural Institute, the Pater Prize for International Drama, the Stewart Parker Award for Drama from the BBC, and the Éilís Dillon Award for Children's Literature.

Many of his stories and plays have been translated into other languages, including Russian, Italian, French, Croatian, Polish, Arabic, Romanian, English and Gaelic.

== Political views ==
On immigration, Titley advocated a totally open borders policy in 2023.

== Bibliography ==
=== Irish ===
- Lámh, Lámh Eile, 2018
- An Bhean Feasa, 2014
- An Chuallacht Léannta: ceiliúradh ar Íosánaigh agus Léann na Gaeilge, 2013
- Rabhadh Dánta, 2013
- Smuf, 2012
- Na Drámaí Garbha, 2011
- Scríbhneoirí faoi chaibidil, 2010
- Gluaiseacht, 2009
- An réabhlóid mar ghníomh dínite, 2007
- Tyda, 2006
- Beir leat do shár-Ghaeilg Súil siar agus ar aghaidh, 2004
- Amach, 2003
- Leabhar Nóra Ní Anluain: céad scéal ó cheartlár na cruinne, 1998
- Chun doirne: rogha aistí, 1996
- Fabhalscéalta, 1995
- An cogadh in aghaidh na critice, 1994
- An fear dána, 1993
- An t-úrscéal Gaeilge, 1991
- Tagann Godot, 1991
- Eiriceachtaí agus Scéalta Eile, 1987
- Stiall fhial feola, 1980
- Méirscrí na treibhe, 1978
- Máirtín Ó Cadhain: clár saothair, 1975

=== English ===
- The Dirty Dust. Cré na Cille, 2015
- The History of the Irish Book, vol. II, 2013
- Nailing Theses:selected essays, 2011
- A pocket history of Gaelic culture, 2000
