= MacMhuirich bardic family =

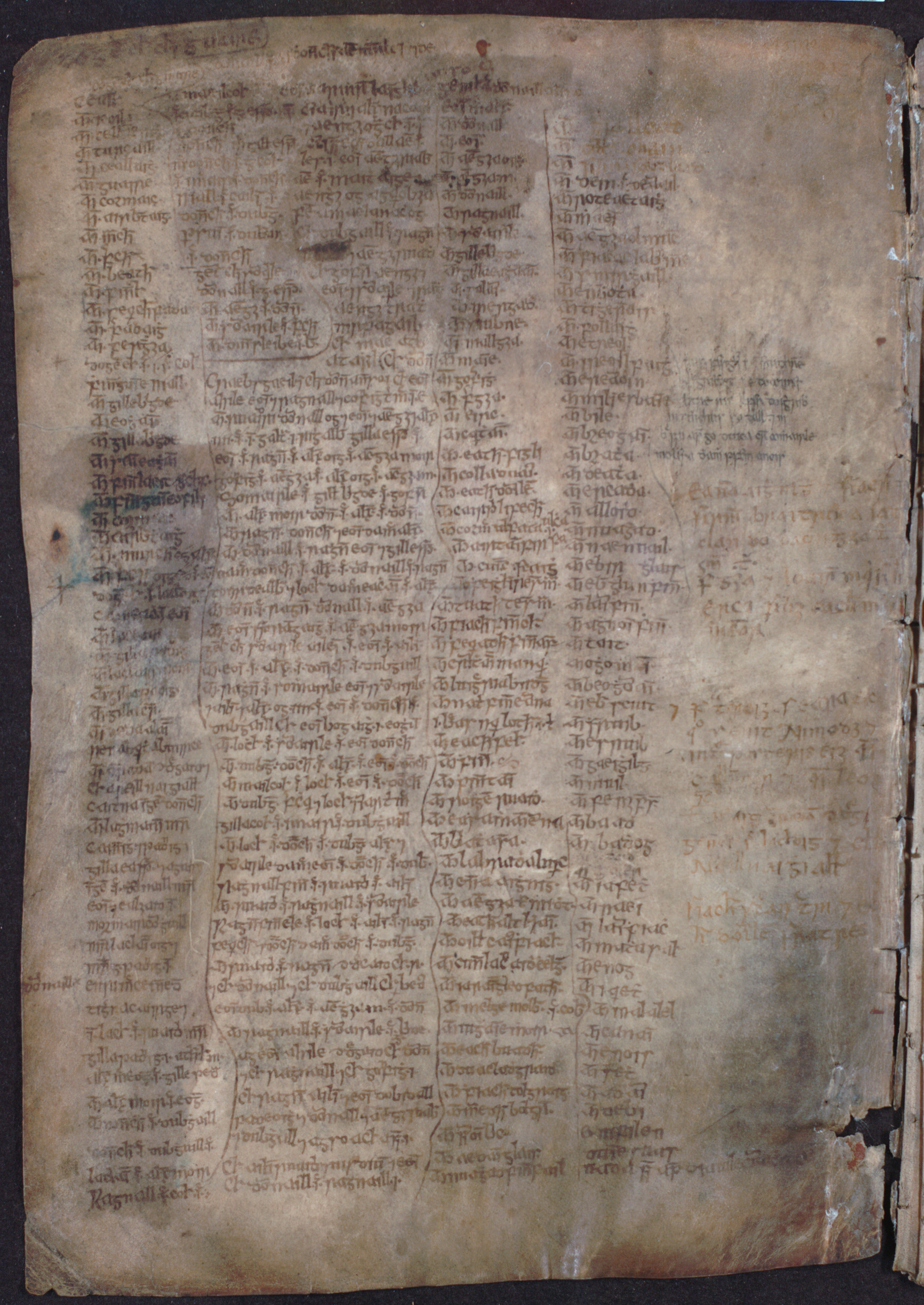
The mid 15th century MS 1467 (pictured) was likely composed by a member of Clann MacMhuirich.

The MacMhuirich bardic family, known in Scottish Gaelic as Clann MacMhuirich and Clann Mhuirich, and anglicised as Clan Currie was a prominent family of bards and other professionals in the 15th to 18th centuries. The family was centred in the Hebrides, and claimed descent from a 13th-century Irish bard who, according to legend, was exiled to Scotland. The family was at first chiefly employed by the Lords of the Isles as poets, lawyers, and physicians. With the fall of the Lordship of the Isles in the 15th century, the family was chiefly employed by the chiefs of the MacDonalds of Clanranald. Members of the family were also recorded as musicians in the early 16th century, and as clergymen possibly as early as the early 15th century.

== History ==
=== Supposed origins ===
The family claimed descent from Muireadhach Albanach Ó Dálaigh (fl.1200–1230). Muireadhach Albanach was a member of the eminent Ó Dálaigh bardic dynasty. This family is sometimes traced back to either of two men named Dálach: one is the legendary student of Abbot Colmán mac Lénéni of Cloyne; the other is another legendary figure, who was a descendant of the 8th-century Irish king Fergal mac Maíle Dúin, son of Maíle Fithraig. Muireadhach Albanach gained the nickname Albanach ("the Scot") in reference to the time he spent in Scotland. He supposedly spent 15 years there after being exiled for killing a steward of Domhnall Mór Ó Domhnaill (1207–1241), Lord of Tyrconell. While in Scotland, Muireadhach Albanach was employed as a bard by the Earls of Lennox, and it appears as if members of his family also settled in the Lennox, as a "Kathil Macmurchy" is recorded in the Lennox in the mid 13th century. (Note: In Scotland, the masculine Gaelic name Cathal has been confined mainly to the MacMhuirich family.) In a lament that Muireadhach Albanach composed on the death of his wife, Maol Mheadha, he stated that they had 11 children.

=== A professional family ===
The Red Book of Clanranald, on display in the National Museum of Scotland, Edinburgh

An early member of the MacMhuirich family was Lachlann Mór MacMhuirich, who authored the battle-incitement poem of Clan Donald (Clann Domhnaill) sometime before the Battle of Harlaw, which took place in 1411. A possible descendant of Lachlann's was one "Lacclannus mcmuredhaich archipoeta", who witnessed a charter of Aonghas of Islay, son of the last member of Clann Domhnaill to be recognised as Lord of the Isles. Other members of the MacMhuirich family, possibly one or two, composed poems of Aonghas's murder that are preserved in the Book of the Dean of Lismore. From about the 1490s and onwards, members of the family are also recorded as clergymen (and possibly as early as 1432, if the "John Muaritti" recorded in the Apostolic Camera is indeed a MacMhuirich).

Following the collapse of the Lordship of the Isles, the MacMhuirich family appears to have been chiefly employed by the chiefs of the MacDonalds of Clanranald (Clann Raghnaill). The earliest poet of the MacMhuirich family on record is Niall Mór MacMhuirich (c. 1550 - c. 1613). A member of the family was the seanchaidh (story-teller and genealogist) who authored much of the Books of Clanranald, which date to the 17th and early 18th centuries. One of these books, the so-called Red Book, is best known for its account of the history of Clann Domhnaill, which was composed by Niall. The other book, the so-called Black Book, is more of a miscellaneous compilation, although it contains a version of Niall's history composed by a member of the Beaton kindred, another learned family of professionals that was once centred in the Hebrides.

Other noted members of the family were Cathal MacMhuirich (fl.1625) and Niall MacMhuirich (c.1637–1726), the last fully competent practitioner of the family and who was still working in the first quarter of the 18th century. In the first part of the 16th century members of the family are also recorded as Harpers, and one "John oig M^{c} murcquhie leiche in Ilay", a physician, is recorded in 1615. In the second half of the 17th century, Ruairidh MacMhuirich (anglicised as Roderick Morison), known as an Clàrsair Dall (the Blind Harper) was a bard who served Chief John MacLeod "the Speckled" of Clan MacLeod until the latter's death in 1693. John's successor, the similarly named Rockerick MacLeod "the Younger", was an absentee landlord for whom Morison composed Oran do Mhac Leoid Dhun Bheagain ("A Song for MacLeod of Dunvegan"), rebuking the chief for not performing his traditional duties to his subjects and failing to support traditional Gaelic culture. Morison died in 1713. The last of the family to practice Classical Gaelic poetry was Domhnall MacMhuirich, who lived on South Uist, as a tenant of Macdonald of Clanranald, in the 18th century.

== Modern day ==
In the modern period, descendants of Clann MacMhuirich are generally associated with the surname Currie, an anglicized form of MacMhuirich.

Following the decline of the traditional Gaelic learned orders in the 18th century, the lineage persisted primarily through diaspora communities in Scotland, North America, and elsewhere.

In 1959, descendants of the family held a gathering at which World War II veteran Colonel William McMurdo Currie was elected as a representative figure of the name. Prior to his death in 1992, he designated Robert Currie as his successor in the role of "Clan Commander", a title used within the modern organization rather than one formally recognized in Scottish heraldic law.

In the late 20th and early 21st centuries, organized efforts to preserve and promote the heritage of the MacMhuirich bardic tradition have been undertaken by groups such as the Clan Currie Society (also known as the Learned Kindred of Currie). The organization operates internationally and is governed by a board composed of members of the Currie family in both the United States and Scotland. Its activities include cultural programming, heritage events, and educational initiatives focused on Scottish and Gaelic traditions.

A significant milestone in the modern history of the kindred occurred in 2017, when an international family convention was held in Glasgow, Scotland. The gathering brought together members of the Currie family from across the diaspora and was convened to select a representative leader for the kindred. The event has been described as the first such effort in centuries and resulted in the recognition of Robert Currie as Clan Commander by those in attendance. The convention was conducted with involvement from the Court of the Lord Lyon, although no chief of the name has been formally recognized.

Modern activities associated with the kindred include the organization of cultural events such as Tartan Day programming in the United States and the promotion of Gaelic arts including music, poetry, and storytelling.

Efforts toward formal clan organization have continued into the 21st century, including further family conventions and ongoing engagement with the Court of the Lord Lyon, which governs heraldic recognition in Scotland. However, the MacMhuirich/Currie kindred does not currently have a chief recognized by the Lord Lyon King of Arms.

== See also ==
- Beaton medical kindred - another major learned Gaelic kindred.
