= Cearbhall Óg Ó Dálaigh =

17th century Irish poet and harpist

Cearbhall Óg Ó Dálaigh (IPA: [ˈcaɾˠ(ə)wəl̪ˠ oː ˈd̪ˠaːlˠiː]; fl. 1630), sometimes spelt in English as Carroll Oge O'Daly, was a 17th-century Irish language poet and harpist, who composed the song "Eileanóir a Rún".

Cearbhall (Carroll) was a common name amongst people of the Ó Dálaigh (O'Daly, Daly) surname, and more than one poet of that surname bore the name. The Cearbhall Óg who composed "Eileanóir a Rún" was from Pallas, near Gorey in County Wexford. The Eileanóir of the poem was the daughter of Sir Morgan Kavanagh of Clonmullen in County Wexford. In folklore, Cearbhall is presented as a womaniser and trickster similar to the Gobán Saor.

== "Eileanóir a Rún" ==
Irish folklore recounts how Eileanóir Chaomhánach (Eleanor Kavanagh) eloped with Cearbhall (Carroll) on the day that she was about to marry another man. Cearbhall arrived at the wedding to play music at the wedding feast, and fell in love with the bride. He composed the song "Eileanoir a Rún" to woo the bride.

Mo ghrá thú, den chéad fhéachaint, Eileanóir a Rún
Is ort a bhím ag smaoineadh, tráth a mbím i mo shuan
A ghrá den tsaol, is a chéad searc, is tú is deise ná ban Éireann.

Translation:

From the moment I saw you I loved you, Eileanóir my love
It is of you I think when I'm resting
O love of life and my first love, you are fairer than all the women of Ireland.

== Other songs and poems ==
Another song, in the style of the crosántacht, "Seachrán Chearbhaill", is ascribed to Cearbhall Óg. Both a poem by the Dominican priest Pádraigín Haicéad that is addressed to Cearbhall, and Cearbhall's poem in response, survive in a 17th-century manuscript. The story "Mac na Míchomhairle" (The Son of Poor Council) has been ascribed to him in folklore, but current scholarship casts doubt on this ascription.

== In recordings ==
A version of "Seachrán Chearbhaill" by Joe Éinniu (Seosamh Ó hÉanaí) is available on a CD with the book Joe Éinniu: Nár fhágha mé Bás Choíche by Liam Mac Con Iomaire (Cló Iarchonnachta 2007); and a later recording of an earlier version of the song on Peadar Ó Ceannabháin's CD, Mo Chuid den tSaol (Cló-Iarchonnachta). There are many commercially available recordings of "Eleanór a Rún".

Both songs are recognised as part of the traditional Irish-language repertoire of unaccompanied ballads known as 'sean-nós song'.

== In literature ==
Cearbhall Óg Ó Dálaigh appears as an historical character in Darach Ó Scolaí's Irish-language novel An Cléireach, as a soldier in the Royalist army in 1650 and in the Spanish Netherlands as late as 1662.

== Bibliography ==
- Doan, James E. (1982). "Cearbhall Ó Dálaigh as Craftsman and Trickster". Béaloideas. 50. Folklore of Ireland Society: 54–89. doi:10.2307/20522186. JSTOR 20522186.
- Harrison, Alan (1979). An Chrosántacht (in Irish). An Clóchomhar.
- Mac Con Iomaire, Liam (2007). Joe Éinniú: Nár fhágha mé bás choíche (in Irish). Cló Iarchonnachta.
- Ní Mhurchú, Máire; Breathnach, Diarmuid (2001). Beatháisnéis 1560–1781 (in Irish). An Clóchomhar.
- Ó hÓgáin, Dáithí. An File (in Irish).
- Ó Scolaí, Darach (2007). "Leabhar Breac". An Cléireach (in Irish).
