= Aonghus Ruadh Ó Dálaigh =

Irish poet

Aonghus Ruadh Ó Dálaigh (born c.1280 - died 1350) was an Irish poet.

== Genealogy ==
His pedigree was: Aonghus Ruadh, son of Donnchadh Ruadh Ó Dálaigh, son of Aengus, son of Donnchadh Mor, son of Aenghusa, son of Tiadgh doichligh, son of Con Connacht na scoile, son of Dalaigh, son of Muiredhaigh, son of Taidgh, son of Giolla coimded, son of Dalaigh (from whom the Ó Dálaighs were named), son of Fachtna, son of Cuirc, son of Adaimh, son of Maile Duin, son of Fergaile, son of Maile Duin, son of Maile Dithrig.

== Birth ==
He was born in County Westmeath, probably in the barony of Corkaree where his family were lords.

== Ollam of Meath ==
He was already an adult poet in 1309, when he wrote a poem of 192 verses on the erection by the King of Connacht, Hugh McOwen O'Conor, in that year of a castle on the hill of Carn Fraoich or Carnfree in County Roscommon, An tu aris a raith Theamhrach (Do you appear again, O Fort of Tara).

He also composed a poem of 448 verses entitled: Adhamh, athair, sruth ár sluagh (Adam, father and source of our race), which tells of the various races that inhabited Ireland before the coming of the Milesians.

Ó Dálaigh was poet to Ruaidhri O'Maelmhuaidh, chief of Fearcall, then located in County Meath but now comprising the baronies of Ballyboy and Ballycowan in County Offaly. He got drunk and offended the chief, whereupon to appease his lord's anger he composed a poem of 192 verses entitled: Ceangal do shioth riom a Ruadhri (Confirm thy peace with me, O Ruaidhri!), in which he urges the chief to attack the English and make friends with his own poet, Ó Dálaigh.

He seemed to make a habit of offending rulers as, in the reign of Cormac Ballach mac Art who was King of Meath from 1344 to 1362, he left that kingdom without the king's permission, sometime between 1344 and 1347, to take up the post of ollam in the barony of Corcomroe, County Clare. As a punishment the king attacked the poet's property in Westmeath. In revenge Aonghus Ruadh satirised the king. His grandson, Fearghal Ó Dálaigh, later composed a poem about the incident entitled Maith fear mar chách, a Chormaic.

== Family ==
He had at least two sons. The Annals of the Four Masters for 1367 state: Teige and Loughlin, two sons of Aengus Roe O'Daly, died. His grandson was the poet Fearghal Ó Dálaigh.

== Death ==
The Annals of Ulster for 1347 state: Aengus Ua Dalaigh, the Red, (namely; son of Donnchadh, son of Aengus, son of Donnchadh Mor), a sage without defect, died. The Annals of the Four Masters for 1350 state: Aengus Roe O'Daly, the most learned of the poets of Ireland, died. The Annals of Loch Cé for 1350 state: Aenghus Ruadh O'Dalaigh, the most eminent poet in Erinn, quievit. The Annals of Connacht for 1350 state: Aengus Ruad O Dalaig; master-poet of Ireland, rested.
