= Bard Boinne =

Bard Boinne was an Irish poet, who died in 931.

Bard Boinne was the Chief Ollam of Ireland from 930 until his death. His obituary in the Annals of the Four Masters is as follows: “M931.13 Bard Boinne, chief poet of Ireland, was slain by the Ui-Cormaic-Cobha”.

His obituary in the Chronicon Scotorum is as follows: “Annal CS933 Kalends. Bard Bone, chief poet of Ireland, was killed by the Uí Cormaic of the Uí Echach.”

== See also ==
- Uí Echach Cobo

Preceded by Óengus mac Óengusa	Chief Ollam of Ireland; 930–931	Succeeded by Uallach ingen Muinecháin
