= Fearghal Ó Dálaigh =

Irish poet (died 1420)

Fearghal Ó Dálaigh (born before 1368 - died 1420) was an Irish poet.

== Genealogy ==
His pedigree was: Fearghal Ó Dálaigh, son of Tadhg, son of Aonghus Ruadh, son of Donnchadh Ruadh, son of Aengus, son of Donnchadh Mor, son of Aenghusa, son of Tadhg doichligh, son of Con Connacht na scoile, son of Dalaigh, son of Muiredhaigh, son of Tadhg, son of Giolla coimded, son of Dalaigh (from whom the Ó Dálaighs were named), son of Fachtna, son of Cuirc, son of Adaimh, son of Maile duin, son of Fergaile, son of Maile duin, son of Maile fithrig.

== Birth ==
His father died in 1367 and his grandfather, the poet Aonghus Ruadh Ó Dálaigh, died in 1350, so he would have been born before 1368. His family had lands in both the barony of Corcomroe, County Clare, and in Kilkenny West barony, County Westmeath, so it is likely he was born in one of those.

== Poet ==
In 1415 the Lord Lieutenant of Ireland, John Talbot, the soi-disant 6th Baron Furnivall (later John Talbot, 1st Earl of Shrewsbury) plundered Ó Dálaigh's land in what is now Bryanmore Upper townland, Kilkenny West barony, County Westmeath. The Annals of Connacht for 1415 state: Many Englishmen came to Ireland with Lord Furnival, lieutenant of the King of England. In the following summer he plundered O Dalaig of Corcumroe, Fergal, son of Tadc, son of Aengus Ruad, at Bruiden Da Coca in Machaire Cuircne. The Annals of the Four Masters for 1415 state: Lord Furnival came to Ireland as Lord Justice. In the ensuing Summer he plundered O'Daly of Corcumroe, i.e. Farrell, the son.

Ó Dálaigh quarreled with Cormac O'Maoileachluinn, King of Meath from 1401-c.1420. He then addressed a poem to the king asking for forgiveness, entitled Maith fear mar chách, a Chormaic.

== Death ==
The Annals of the Four Masters for 1420 state: Farrell O'Daly, Ollav of Corcomroe in poetry, died.
