= Ollamh Érenn =

Chief poet or bard of Gaelic Ireland

The Ollamh Érenn (Old Irish: [ˈol̪aβ̃ ˈeːɾʲen̪]) or Chief Ollam of Ireland was a professional title of Gaelic Ireland.

== Background ==
An ollam (literally 'most great') was a poet or bard of literature and history. Each chief or tuath had its own ollam. The head ollam of a province such as Ulster would have been the head of all the ollams in that province, and would have been a social equal of the provincial king.

Above all of the provincial ollams was the Ard-Ollamh (Rí-Ollam, Rí-Eigeas, Príméces), who held the official post of Chief-Ollamh of Ireland or "Ollamh Érenn".

Generally within a Gaelic region or Kingdom, one particular Túath (the most powerful one), would provide an Ard-Ollamh and Overking (Ruiri) for the entire region. An example is in Ulaid, overall power was hotly contested and at times swapped between the ruling territory rival dynasties or Sept of the Dál Fiatach and Dál nAraidi.

=== The Poetic Courts ===
According to Daniel Corkery, in 18th century Munster, a custom similar to the Welsh Eisteddfod continued long after the destruction of the Irish clan system. In what was also both mimicry and satire of the English-dominated legal and court system, the Ollamh Érenn of a district would preside over sessions of a Cúirt, or Poetic Court. A Munster Cúirt would begin with "bailiffs" delivering often humorously worded "warrants" which summoned local Irish-language poets to a Bardic competition with the Ollamh acting as the "judge". In many cases, two Irish-language poets at the Cúirt would engage in Flyting; a mixture of debate poetry and the improvised trading of insults in verse. Also according to Corkery, much of the serious, improvised, and comic poetry in the Irish-language composed for sessions of the Munster Poetic Courts was written down by the Court "Recorders" and still survives. At the beginning of his term, the Chief Poet of a district, similarly to an Irish clan chief, would receive a Staff of Office (Irish: Bata na Bachaille), which would later be handed down to his successor. This tradition continued at least until 1792.

== Social status ==
The social status of the Ard-Ollamh was equal to the High King of Ireland. He had his own palace and a large retinue of about thirty ollamhs together with their servants. The sumptuary laws allowed him to wear six colours in his clothes, the same as the king. The ollamh had a gold bell-branch held above him, the anruth had a silver bell-branch and the other poets had a bronze bell-branch. The post was partly hereditary, as Uraicecht na Ríar ("The Primer of the Stipulations", ed. Liam Breatnach, DIAS 1987) states that a poet can only attain ollamh-rank if he stems from a family of poets (that is, if his father and grandfather had been poets). Originally the Ollamh was appointed by the king but by the 6th century AD, it had become an elected post which was voted for by the other ollamhs.

== In Gaelic-Irish literature ==
An old Irish tale "Immacallam in dá Thuarad" ("The Colloquy of the Two Sages") gives an idea of the type of lofty speech of the chief ollamh.

Another old tale called "Tromdámh Guaire" ("The Heavy Company of Guaire") or "Imtheacht na Tromdhaimhe" ("The Proceedings of the Great Bardic Institution") gives a vivid description of the Chief Ollam with his entourage visiting the Irish clan chiefs.

In Lebor Gabala Erenn, an Ollamh is mentioned, named Ollamh Fodla. It relates "Ollamh Fodla, fierce in valour, Marked out the Scholar's Rampart, The first mighty king with grace, Who convened the Festival of Tara. Fifty years, it was tuneful fame, was he in the High Kingship over Ireland so that from him, with lucky freedom, Ulaidh received its name. He died a natural death within its capital."

== Duties and fees ==
The Irish chiefs and kings were supposed to give food and gifts to these wandering bands of ollamhs which proved a great burden to them. If they refused they were satirised. The Synod or Convention of Drumceat in 584 AD was called to pass new laws to keep control of the ollams. Geoffrey Keating's History of Ireland states that St Columba or Columcille interceded on their behalf as follows:

"'I do not wish to keep the filés,' said the king, 'so unjust are their demands and so numerous are they. For there are usually thirty in the train of an ollamh, and fifteen in that of an anroth, and so on for the other grades of the filé down to the lowest.' Each of them used to have a separate train of attendants according to his degree, so that nearly the third of the men of Ireland followed the bardic profession. Columcille said to the king that it was right to set aside many of the filés, as they were so numerous. But he advised him to maintain a filé as his own chief ollamh after the example of the kings who went before him, and that each provincial king should have an ollamh, and, moreover, that each lord of a cantred or district in Ireland should have an ollamh, and Columcille proposed this plan and Aodh assented to it; From this regulation, which was made by Aodh, son of Ainmire, and Columcille, it followed that the king of Ireland and every provincial king and every lord of a cantred had a special ollamh, and that each of these ollamhs had free land from his own lord, and, moreover, the lands and worldly possessions of each of these ollamhs enjoyed general exemption and sanctuary from the men of Ireland. It was also ordained that a common estate should be set apart for the ollamhs where they could give public instruction after the manner of a University, such as Raith Cheannait and Masruidhe Mhuighe Sleacht, in Breithfne, where they gave free instruction in the sciences to the men of Ireland, as many as desired to become learned in seanchus and in the other sciences that were in vogue in Ireland at that time. The ardollamh of Ireland at that time was Eochaidh Eigeas, son of Oilill, son of Earc, and it was he who was called Dallán Forgaill, and he sent out ollamhs and set them over the provinces of Ireland, namely, Aodh Eigeas over the district of Breagh and over Meath, Urmhaol chief eigeas over the two provinces of Munster, Sanchan, son of Cuairfheartach, over the province of Connaught, and Fear Firb, son of Muireadhach, son of Mongan, in the ollamhship of Ulster; and, moreover, an ollamh in every cantred in Ireland under these high ollamhs, and they were to have free land from their territorial chiefs, as well as sanctuary, as we have said; and each of them was to get certain rewards for their poems and compositions."

== List of Chief Ollamhs ==
=== Prehistoric era ===
- Amergin Glúingel
- Lugh Lámhfhada
- Adna mac Uthidir, c. 1st century A.D.

=== Early Medieval poets ===
- Torna Éices, fl. c. 400
- Dubhthach moccu Lughair, c. 432
- Dallán Forgaill, Chief Ollamh from c.590 to c.640
- Senchán Torpéist, Chief Ollamh from c.640 to c.649
- Máel Muire Othain, died 887
- Flann mac Lonáin, 896
- Torpaid mac Taicthech, died 913
- Óengus mac Óengusa, died 930
- Bard Boinne, died 931
- Uallach ingen Muinecháin, died 934
- Cormacan Eigeas, died 946
- Cinaedh Ua hArtagain, died 975
- Eochaidh Ua Floinn, died 984
- Urard Mac Coise, died 990

=== High Medieval era ===
- Clothna mac Aenghusa, died 1008
- Muircheartach mac Cu Ceartach Mac Liag, died 1015
- Cúán úa Lothcháin, died 1024
- Cú Mara mac Mac Liac, died 1030
- Mac Beathaidh mac Ainmire, died 1041
- Ceaunfaeladh ua Cuill, died 1048
- Flaithem Mac Mael Gaimrid, died 1058
- Cellach húa Rúanada, died 1079
- Mael Isa ua Máilgiric, died 1088
- Cú Collchaille Ua Baígilláin, died 1119
- Cú Connacht Ua Dálaigh, died 1139
- Gillamaire Ua Conallta, died 1166
- Tadhg Ua Dálaigh, died 1181
- Máel Íosa Ua Dálaigh, died 1185

=== Late Medieval poets ===
- Giolla Ernain Ó Martain, died 1218
- Gofraidh Fionn Ó Dálaigh, died 1387
- Cearbhall mac Lochlainn Ó Dálaigh, died 1405
- Sean mac Fergail Óicc Ó hUiccinn, died 1490
- Paidin Ó Maol Chonaire, died 1506
- Seán mac Torna Ó Maol Chonaire, fl. mid-16th century.
