= Darach Ó Scolaí =

Irish writer (born 1963)

- Born: Darach Ó Scolaí; 1963; Dublin, Ireland
- Education: University of Galway
- Occupations: Writer, artist, publisher
- Writing career
- Years active: 1998–present
- Genres: Novel, retellings, translation, play, screenplay, illustrated book for children and adults

Darach Ó Scolaí (Irish: [/ˈda.rax/ /oː/ /sˠkˠoː/l̪ˠəi/]; born 1963) is an Irish author, screenwriter, and producer of screen and stage. He works in a number of genres, from novels, plays and screenplays to illustrated books for children and adults. Nós magazine has described Ó Scolaí as "one of the great Irish language novelists" and Books Ireland described him as "one of the most important Irish language writers of his generation".

Much of his fiction is based on a knowledge of traditional Irish tales and narrative practices as well as Irish history. He specialises in literary and historical fiction. His retellings of old stories and tales from their original Middle and Early Modern Irish into Modern Irish (Gaeilge) are respected for their accessibility to students and language learners as well as for their artistry. He also regularly reviews books, and lectures and writes on literature and culture. He is also a publisher, and has co-produced a number of films, television shows, and stage plays.

In 1995 Darach Ó Scolaí and his brother co-founded the publishing house Leabhar Breac at Inverin, County Galway, and in 1998 Darach was co-founder of the film and television production company Rosg. He began his literary career in 1998 writing screenplays, stage plays, retellings and translations; he began to publish novels in 2008. Ó Scolaí founded the stage production company Salamandar in 2006.

== Early life and education ==
Darach Ó Scolaí was born in Dublin in 1963. He grew up in the Galway Gaeltacht (Irish-speaking) regions of Cois Fharraige on the north shore of Galway Bay, in the Republic of Ireland. Irish was the language of his parents' home.

He graduated the University of Galway (then University College Galway) with a B.A. in 1983.

== Career ==
=== Writing and publishing ===
Ó Scolaí writes in Irish. None of his works has been translated into English.

In 1995 Darach Ó Scolaí and his brother Caomhán Ó Scolaí — a typographer and designer — founded the publishing house Leabhar Breac at Indreabhán (Inverin), County Galway. Their father "Séamas Ó Scolaí was an editor at An Gúm and worked on the Irish-English dictionary team [bhí a n-athair Séamas Ó Scolaí ina eagarthóir sa Ghúm agus d'oibrigh sé ar fhoireann an fhoclóra Gaeilge-Béarla]." Darach Ó Scolaí has been publisher and literary editor at Leabhar Breac since its founding.

Named for An Leabhar Breac (The Speckled Book), Leabhar Breac publishing house has more than 140 books in print. Leabhar Breac aims to publish Irish-language books that meet "a high literary and artistic standard." Besides the content, Leabhar Breac is known for the typically "superb [thar cionn]" quality of the design and production of the "physical book [leabhar fisiciúil]". Its books regularly win awards for literary and artistic quality. Leabhar Breac also publishes translations for children and adults from various early versions of Irish as well as from French and English (and has published translations of books for young readers from Spanish, Catalan, and Italian as well).

Leabhar Breac prints its books in Ireland.

=== Stage and screen ===
In 1998 along with Ciarán Ó Cofaigh, Ó Scolaí co-founded the film and television production company Rosg, and was co-director until 2006. Rosg produced Ó ScolaÍ's films Cosa Nite (1999), An Leabhar (2001) and Na Cloigne (2010). He left Rosg in 2006 to devote his time to other artistic activities.

In 2004, along with Val Balance, Ó Scolaí co-founded the annual artists' symposium Ealaín ar Oileán ("Art on an Island"). The Irish-language symposium was held annually in the Áras Éanna arts and cultural center on Inis Oírr (Inisheer, the smallest of the Aran Islands) from 2004 to 2013. Ó Scolaí was its co-director from its founding until 2013.

Besides being its co-director, Ó Scolaí has taken part in this conference as an artist and writer.

In 2006 Ó Scolaí founded the stage production company Salamandar and directed his own play An Braon Aníos. His plays An tSeanbhróg (2009) and Craos (2008) were also produced by Salamandar.

== Recognition and critical reception ==
As a figure in contemporary Irish literature, Ó Scolaí has been described by Books Ireland as "one of the most important Irish language writers of his generation", and by Nós as "one of the great Irish language novelists". His writing has been called "the high literature of the Irish language."

Novelist Alan Titley wrote in 2020 that Ó Scolaí's "peak (for now), or at least his greatest imaginative interest, is the historical novel [tá an chuma air gurb é a bhuaic (go fóill), nó ar a laghad, a mhórspéis samhlaíochta, an t-úrscéal staire]."

Ó Scolaí's style has been called "crisp and elegant, and rich in language while being highly readable," with "an unsurpassed richness and precision of language."

Ó Scolaí's first novel, the 2007 An Cléireach (The Clerk) won two prizes and was described as "one of the great historical novels in the Irish language and among the best books written in the language since the beginning of this century." Novelist Alan Titley wrote that the author "creates the Ireland of war in the 17th century more fully than any other Irish writer on the subject of war since L'Attaque Eoghain Ó Thuairisc around 1798 [In An Cléireach cruthaíonn Ó Scolaí Éire an chogaidh san 17ú haois níos iomláine ná mar a dhein aon scríbhneoir Gaeilge eile ar ábhar cogaidh ó L'Attaque Eoghain Uí Thuairisc timpeall ar 1798]." Not all the reviews of this first novel were so positive, however; Proinsias O' Drisceoil, for The Irish Times, wrote: "This then is a novel in search of a plot, a story that attempts to attain a significance that eludes it".

In the Oxford Handbook of Modern Irish Fiction Pádraig Ó Siadhail analyses rather than reviews An Cléireach:

In An Cléireach, Ó Scolaí revisits the trauma of Cromwellian Ireland. The primary narrative device is once again the first-hand account, in this case by Tadhg Ó Dúbháin, a clerk and quartermaster in the Confederate Army in 1650. We sample the hardships, the friendships, the tensions, the rivalries, and the petty jealousies amongst comrades in arms, including remnants of the Gaelic literary class, as the Confederate soldiers, increasingly a rabble more than a cohesive unit, retreat in advance of Cromwell's forces. An Cléireach concludes with the narrator and his family in exile in continental Europe. But along the retreat route, and central to the novel, members of the Confederate army camp, rest up, and tell versions of a story about the keeper of the treasured manuscript "Saltair an Easpaig" (The Bishop's Psalter). Their versions raise issues about memory construction, the limitations of individual perspectives, personal agendas, and how minor changes in the telling of a story can alter our understanding of history.

Of Súil an Daill, in Nós, Cathal Seoighe wrote: "The book deserves a significant place among the collection of high-quality books published in recent years that would make you feel sorry for someone who does not speak Irish [Tá áit shuntasach ag dul don leabhar i measc an chnuasaigh leabhair ar ardchaighdeán a foilsíodh le roinnt blianta anuas a d'fhágfadh trua agat don té atá gan Ghaeilge]."

Táin Bó Cuailnge (The Cattle Raid of Cooley) is a modern edition of an 11th-century epic into modern Irish. Gearóid Denvir reviewed Táin Bó Cuailnge for Comhar:

Darach Ó Scolaí has achieved a feat in this challenging reworking. He has found a high level of the Irish language to tell his story – as he has done before in his groundbreaking novel An Cléireach (2007, Leabhar Breac) and in his other prose works. This book is a decoration of the language, literature and culture of the Irish language, following the path of the old storytellers and writers and presenting material from the tradition to his own generation according to the understandings of his own time. The book will be a classic that will be of great interest to all readers of the Irish language, both ordinary readers, students, scholars and writers, and there should be a copy in every home in the country. [Tá éacht déanta ag Darach Ó Scolaí san athleagan dúshlánach seo. Tá réim ard den teanga Ghaeilge aimsithe aige lena scéal a inseacht – mar a rinne sé cheana ina úrscéal ceannródaíoch An Cléireach (2007, Leabhar Breac) agus i saothair eile phróis dá chuid. Is maisiú ar an teanga agus ar litríocht agus cultúr na Gaeilge an leabhar seo a leanas conair na seanscéalaithe agus na seanscríobhaithe agus ábhar de chuid an traidisiúin á chur i láthair a ghlúine féin aige de réir thuiscintí a linne féin. Clasaic a bheas sa leabhar a gcuirfidh léitheoirí uilig na Gaeilge, idir ghnáthléitheoirí, mhic léinn, scoláirí agus scríbhneoirí spéis thar na bearta ann, agus ba cheart cóip a bheith i chuile theach sa tír.]

Cathal Poirtéir wrote: "The freshness and richness of Ó Scolaí's version are a joy... The author delights us with the linguistic and stylistic richness of the ancient epic in a modern-Irish version that reflects the original's spirit and language". Novelist and academic Alan Titley calls Ó Scolaí's "a wonderful gutsy telling" of Táin Bó Cuailnge.

Marie Whelton, in "Léann Teanga" ("Language Studies"), in the 2024 An Reiviú says,

this version [of Deirdre] by Darach Ó Scolaí succeeds in skillfully capturing and portraying the complexity of gender and power issues in the 'Deirdre' tradition [éiríonn leis an leagan seo le Darach Ó Scolaí castacht cheisteanna na hinscne agus na cumhachta i dtraidisiún scéal Dheirdre a ghabháil agus a léiriú go sciliúil]. … There is no doubt that this new version greatly contributes to the legacy of the story and that it revives that legacy thoughtfully and artistically [Níl amhras faoi ach go gcuireann an leagan úr seo go mór le hoidhreacht an scéil agus go ndéanann sé an oidhreacht sin a athbheochan go tuisceanach agus go healaíonta.].

Meadhbh Ní Eadhra said of Bodach an Chóta Lachna that it was "Beautiful Irish, but easy to understand for young readers."

Ó Scolaí's 2024 novel, Bódléar, was well-reviewed by Éilis Ní Dhuibhne in the Irish Times, who called it "Whimsical, hilarious, and subtly learned... delightful!"

== Awards and honours ==
=== Oireachtas Prize ===
The Oireachtas Prize is the literary prize awarded by Oireachtas na Gaeilge, the annual arts festival dedicated to Irish language, arts and culture. Ó Scolaí has been awarded this prize for three works:

- 2007, for An Cléireach (Note: "(a special prize commemorating the 400th anniversary of the foundation of Coláiste na nGael in Louvain, awarded under the auspices of the Franciscan Province of Ireland). The prize of €10,000 was the largest prize ever awarded to an Irish language novel [(duais speisialta chomórtha 400 bliain bhunú Choláiste na nGael i Lobháin a bronnadh faoi urraíocht Phroibhinse Phroinsiasach na hÉireann). Ba é an duais €10,000 sin an duais ba mhó a bronnadh riamh ar úrscéal Gaeilge].")
- 2021, for Súil an Daill (The Eye of the Blind)
- 2024, for Bódléar

=== An Post Irish Book Awards ===
The Irish Language Fiction Book of the Year Award, sponsored by Love Leabhar Gaeilge (Gradam Love Leabhar Gaeilge Leabhar Ficsin Gaeilge na Bliana)

- Bódléar, 2025

=== Gradam Uí Shúilleabháin "Book of the Year" ===
As of 2023, the first prize of the Gradam Uí Shúilleabháin "Book of the Year" includes €5,000 to the publisher and €2,500 to the author of the winning work. Ó Scolaí has been awarded this prize for three works:

- 2008: An Cléireach (2007)
- Táin Bó Cuailnge, 2018.
- Bódléar, 2025.

==== De Bhaldraithe Award ====
The Gradam de Bhaldraithe is awarded to the best work in translation.

- Cuairt San Nioclás, a translation of Clement Clarke Moore's A Visit from St. Nicholas, or "'Twas the Night Before Christmas".

=== Other awards ===
- 2005: Walter Macken Prize (Bháiteir Uí Mhaicín Memorial Award), for Coinneáil Orainn
- 2006: Stewart Parker Award, for Coinneáil Orainn
- 2017: Aodán Mac Póilin Commemorative Prize, for Táin Bó Cuailnge

== Personal life ==
As of 2024 Ó Scolaí was living with his wife and children in Lochán Beag (Indreabhán). He lives in an area defined for the predominant presence of Irish as the vernacular language, the language spoken at home. Irish was the language of his parents' home and is the language of his children as well.

He is fluent in Irish and English, and conversant in French.

== Works ==
=== Novels ===
- An Cléireach, (The Clerk) Leabhar Breac, 2007. The Oireachtas Prize for Literary Fiction, 2007; The Ó Súilleabháin Award (Book of the Year) in 2008, and "named as 'the best novel since the turn of the Century' by Comhar."
- Na Comharthaí (The Signs), Leabhar Breac, 2014.
- Súil an Daill (The Eye of the Blind), Leabhar Breac, 2021. The Oireachtas Prize for Literary Fiction, 2019.
- Bódléar, Leabhar Breac, 2024. Winner of
  - The Oireachtas Prize for Literary Fiction, 2024
  - The Ó Súilleabháin Award (Book of the Year) in 2025
  - The An Post Irish Language Fiction Book of the Year Award, sponsored by Love Leabhar Gaeilge (Gradam Love Leabhar Gaeilge Leabhar Ficsin Gaeilge na Bliana) in 2025
  - Listen-Up Irish featured Bódléar in its 2025 Summer Challenge for students of the Irish language, and will feature it again in its winter 2026 "Bódléar: A Listening and Reading Challenge".

=== Retellings, translations, and editions ===
Ó Scolaí is known for his retellings of old stories and tales from their original Middle and Early Modern Irish into Modern Irish (Gaeilge).

- Feis Tigh Chonáin (The Feast of Conán's House), Leabhar Breac, 2000; a retelling of a 15th-century tale from the Fenian Cycle.
- An Ceithearnach Caolriabhach (The Narrow-Striped Kern), Leabhar Breac, 2002; a retelling from c. 1500, also illustrated by Darach Ó ScolaÍ.
- Táin Bó Cuailnge (The Cattle Raid of Cooley), Leabhar Breac, 2017, both a modern edition of an 11th-century epic and an annotated edition. "Táin Bó Cuailnge won the Aodán Mac Poilín Memorial Prize 2017."
- Deirdre, Leabhar Breac, 2023, a "picture book for adults" with artist Anastasia Melnykova. Part of the Ulster Cycle, Deirdre is a retelling of the story of possibly the most widely known Irish figure from the early tales and sagas.
- Bláthnaid, Leabhar Breac, 2024, a "picture book for adults" with artist Anastasia Melnykova; "one of the great stories of the Ulster Cycle."
- Sadhbh, Leabhar Breac, 2025, a picture book for adult readers, illustrated by Alé Mercado; a retelling of the medieval tale Ceasacht Inghine Ghuile (The Complaint of Guile's Daughter).
- Eoghan Béal, Leabhar Breac, 2025, a picture book for adult readers illustrated by Alé Mercado; a retelling of the medieval tale Cathréim Ceallaigh from The Yellow Book of Leacan.

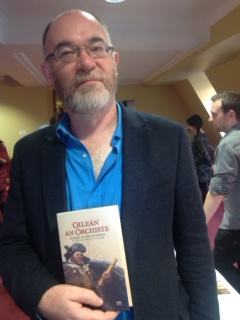
Ó Scolaí holding his translation of R. L. Stevenson's Treasure Island

=== For young readers ===
Ó Scolaí has written illustrated books for young readers (8–10 years old) in two series, the Fionn Series and the Scéalta Staire series, and translated a large number of classics and popular books for children of all ages.

The Fionn Series "is a retelling... of the great legends of the Fianna for the young Irish readers of today." The Boyhood Deeds of Fionn (Macgnímartha Finn) is a medieval story in the Fenian Cycle.

- An Bradán Feasa (The Salmon of Knowledge), Leabhar Breac, 2010, "shortlisted for the Réics Carlo award 2010."
- Dóiteoir na Samhna (The Halloween Burner), 2010.
- Bodach an Chóta Lachna (The Churl in the Dun Coat), 2011.

The Scéalta Staire (Historical Stories) series

- Mánas Ó Dónaill, 2000.
- Seán Ó Néill, Leabhar Breac, 2000.
- Gráinne Mhaol Ní Mháille, Leabhar Breac, 2003.
- Tadhg Dall Ó hUiginn, Leabhar Breac, 2003.

==== Translations ====
- Robert Louis Stevenson, Oileán an Órchiste (trans. of Treasure Island), Leabhar Breac, 2014.
- Robert Louis Stevenson, An Fuadach (trans. of Kidnapped), Leabhar Breac, 2016.
- Clement Clarke Moore, Cuairt San Nioclás (trans. of A Visit from St. Nicholas, or "'Twas the Night Before Christmas"), Leabhar Breac, 2022.

The Corto Maltese Graphic Novels

Written in Italian by Hugo Pratt and translated by Ó Scolaí, both adults and teenagers read this series of Italian adventure graphic novels. Ó Scolaí's translation of Corto Maltese was listed in 2017 among "The 30 Irish books that Irish people love".

- Hugo Pratt, Corto: Port na Farraige Goirt, Leabhar Breac, 2013.
- Hugo Pratt, Corto: The Golden House in Samarkand, 2014.
- Hugo Pratt, Corto: Na Liopard-Fhir ó Rufiji (trans. of Corto: The Leopard Men of Rufiji), Leabhar Breac, 2014.
- Hugo Pratt, Corto: In Ainm Dé Uilthrócairigh (trans. of Corto: In the Name of God All-Merciful), Leabhar Breac, 2014.
- Hugo Pratt, Corto: Tóraíocht Eile (trans. of Corto: Another Quest), Leabhar Breac, 2014.
- Hugo Pratt, Corto: Sa tSibéir (trans. of Corto: In Siberia), Leabhar Breac, 2016.

Other Translations for Children

Ó Scolaí has translated into Irish six books from the Le Pavillon Noir (Jolly Roger) series by Alain Surget; four books from the Catalan First Steps series by Enric Lluch Girbés and the Caitlín & Cormac series by Joan Carles; three books from the Louisette le Taupe series by Bruno Heitz, and three books from the Loup series by Orianne Lallemand.

=== Plays and Screenplays ===
==== Stage Plays ====
Ó Scolaí was writer and director of the original productions of two plays in the Trí Bhraon (Three Drops) trilogy; Coinneáil Orainn was directed by Darach Mac Con Iomaire and staged by An Taibhdhearc. All three plays have been published in book form by Leabhar Breac.

- Coinneáil Orainn (We'll Keep Going), 2005. The first play in the Trí Bhraon (Three Drops) trilogy. An Taibhdhearc, the national Irish-language theatre of Ireland, toured the country in 2005 with Coinneáil Orainn. Walter Macken Prize, 2005; BBC Stewart Parker Award, 2006.
- Branwen, 2006, by Darach Ó Scolaí and Ifor ap Glyn, in Irish, Welsh and English, co-produced by Project Arts Centre and Llwyfan Gogledd Cymru, toured the Republic of Ireland and Wales.
- An Braon Aníos (Rising Damp), 2006, directed by Ó Scolaí. The second play in the Trí Bhraon (Three Drops) trilogy. "The Salamandar company toured the country in 2006-07 with this play, and Salamandar also produced a radio version of the play for RTÉ Raidió na Gaeltachta in 2009."
- Craos (Gluttony), 2008, directed by Ó Scolaí. The third play in the Trí Bhraon (Three Drops) trilogy, it toured to Cork and Belfast. A review of the 2008 Salamander performance in the Irish Times says, "a humorous play which offers plenty to think about, fine acting, and sparklingly witty dialogue."
- A+E, 2008, by Ríonach Ní Néill and Darach Ó Scolaí, "dance and music drama", co-produced by Ciotóg and Salamandar.
- An tSeanbhróg (The Old Shoe), 2009, produced by Salamander and staged in the Axis Arts Centre, Dublin, and the Letterkenny Arts Centre.

==== Screenplays ====
- Cosa Nite (tWashed Feet), short film, 1998 (dir. Dearbhla Walsh, prod. Ciarán Ó Cofaigh, Rosg); "a prose version of Cosa Nite was published (Rosg 2000)." Nominated for an Irish Film and Television Award.
- Na Glúnta (The Generations), 2001, co-directors Ciarán Ó Cofaigh & Darach Ó Scolaí, prod. Ciarán Ó Cofaigh, Rosg.
- An Leabhar (The Book), short film, 2000, (dir. Robert Quinn, prod. Ciarán Ó Cofaigh, Rosg) Rosg, 2000.
- Na Cloigne (The Heads), 3-episode series, 2010 (dir. Robert Quinn, prod. Ciarán Ó Cofaigh, Rosg), TG4.

=== Nonfiction ===
Ó Scolaí's essays and lectures are published and his interviews are broadcast regularly, making for a large body of nonfiction critical and analytical work. Here are a few, almost all published in Comhar:

- "Ceol Ciúin na nÉagmaise" ("The Silent Music of Absence [the Fall?]"), an essay on the 2014 Nobel Prize winner for literature, Patrick Modiano, Comhar, December 2014.
- The Ó Cadhain Lecture 2014 : "Cuimhne agus Díchuimhne ("Memory & Forgetfulness")
- "Rithim agus Réim" ("Rhythm and Register"), a public lecture in the University College Dublin lecture series "Ó Thrácht go Twitter" ("From Talk to Twitter"), 2014.
- Review of Pádraig Ó Cíobháin's Dréachta Chrích Fodla, Comhar?.
- "Na Geilt i mBun an Tí" ("The Madmen in Charge"), a talk at the Merriman Winter School, Comhar April 2012.
- The EFACIS podcast: Síle Ní Choincheannain talks to Darach Ó Scolaí about the historical novel.
