= Daniel O'Daly =

Irish Dominican priest, diplomat and historian

Daniel O'Daly (1595 – 30 June 1662), also known as Dominic Ó Dálaigh and Dominic de Rosario, was an Irish Dominican priest, diplomat and historian. He established the College of Corpo Santo in Lisbon, Portugal for Irish students wishing to study for the priesthood.

== Biography ==
Daniel O'Daly was born in Kerry, Ireland; on his mother's side he belonged to the Desmond branch of the Geraldines, of which branch his paternal ancestors, the Ó'Dálys, were the hereditary chroniclers or bards. He became a Dominican in Tralee, in County Kerry; took his vows in Lugo, studied at Burgos (both in Spain), where he assumed the name Dominic de Rosario, gained his doctorate of theology in Bordeaux and returned as priest to Tralee.

=== College of Corpo Santo ===
In 1627 he was sent to teach theology, and serve as rector, in the newly established College for Irish Dominicans at Louvain University in Flanders. In 1629 he went to Madrid on business connected with this college and, seeing that king Philip IV of Spain favoured the project, he established, assisted by three of his Irish brethren, the Irish Dominican College in Lisbon (Portugal) of which he became the first rector. They were given the property which included the Chapel of Corpo Santo, dedicated to St. Elmo, patron of mariners. The friars at Corpo Santo ministered to Portuguese parishioners as well as to English speakers. The church and convent were destroyed in the 1755 Lisbon earthquake, but by 1770 were rebuilt in a different location.

=== Convent of Our Lady of Bom Successo ===
O'Daly also conceived the project of erecting, near Lisbon, a convent of Irish Dominican nuns, for Irish girls who wished to follow the religious life. Philip granted permission to do so on condition that he should raise a body of Irish soldiers for Spanish service in the Low Countries. O'Daly set sail for Limerick and got the men. On his return to Madrid in 1639, Santa Maria de Belém on the Tagus, four miles below Lisbon, was selected as a site and, with the assistance of the Countess of Atalaya, the convent of Our Lady of Bom Successo was built.

=== Diplomatic career ===
In December 1641 the Portuguese Restoration War started with a coup against the Spanish Vicereine Margaret. The Duke of Braganza was proclaimed King John IV of Portugal, at a time when other revolts were under way in Andalusia and Catalonia. While the war lasted into the 1660s, the immediate problem was securing international recognition for the new kingdom at the time of the Thirty Years' War. Father O'Daly was a senior diplomat in this effort that took many years to complete.

King John made him diplomatic envoy to Louis XIV (helped by the Franco-Spanish War (1635–1659)), Charles I of England, to the exiled Charles II Stuart and to Pope Innocent X (1650). Queen Luisa also sent him as envoy to Pope Alexander VII.

In the year 1655 he was sent as envoy to the French queen Anne of Austria and king Louis XIV to conclude a treaty between Portugal and France. Here as elsewhere, success attended him; but while negotiations abroad and matters of government at home afforded opportunities of serving the Portuguese royal House of Braganza, he would not accept any honour in return. His acquaintances praise his straightforwardness, honesty, tact and disinterestedness. He refused the Archbishopric of Braga, the Primacy of Goa and the Bishopric of Coimbra; nor would he accept the titles of Privy Councillor or Queen's Confessor, though he held both offices.

During this period, his primary focus was to establish his college securely and ensure it contributed significantly to Ireland. Bom Successo proved inadequate for the growing number of students. In 1659, he initiated the construction of a larger building known as Corpo Santo by laying its foundation stone. To provide funds for these houses he consented to become Bishop of Coimbra and, in consequence, President of the royal Privy Council; but before the papal Bull arrived he died at Lisbon in 1662.

His remains reposed in the cloister of Corpo Santo until the 1755 Lisbon earthquake; the inscription on his tomb recorded that he was "In varus Regum legationibus felix, ... Vir Prudentia, Litteris, and Religione conspicuus" ("Successful in embassies for kings ... A man distinguished for prudence, knowledge and virtue".) A few years after the catastrophe, on the same spot, with the same name and object, a new college and church arose.

== Works ==
In 1665, soon after his death, was published his Initium, Incrementum, et Exitus Familiæ Geraldinorum, etc., on the Earls of Desmond, for which he availed himself of the traditional knowledge of his ancestors. In the first part he describes the origin of the Munster Geraldines, their varying fortunes and their end in the heroic struggle for faith and fatherland. The second part treats of the cruelties inflicted on the Irish Catholics, and of the martyrdom of twenty Dominicans, many of whom had been with him in Lisbon. The book was translated into English and edited by the Irish historian Father CP Meehan and published in 1849 and 1878.

== See also ==
- Dominicans in Ireland
