= Immacallam in dá Thuarad =

The Immacallam in dá Thuarad, or The Colloquy of the two Sages ("Colloquy" sometimes being replaced with "Dialogue"), is an example of bardic, or Ollamhic in this case, interchange found in the twelfth century Book of Leinster.

The story is that when Adna mac Uthidir, Ollamh to the King of Ulster (Conchobar mac Nessa), died, his title was given to the poet (presumably a Fili) Ferchertne, a man of high arts and experience. But Adnae's son, Néde, who was away studying in Scotland, heard of his father's death on the waves while walking the shore. "One day the youth went forth along the edge of the sea - poets ever believed that the brink of water was a place of revelation. And as he stood there, he heard a sound like a wailing chant of sadness, which seemed strange to him. So he cast a spell upon the water, causing it to reveal to him what was the matter. And the wave declared that the wailing he had heard was for the death of his father, Adne, whose poet's robes had been given to Ferchertne, who had taken the ollaveship in his place."

He thus returned to Emain Macha (Capital of Ulster), carrying a silver branch above him, for the ánrad's, or poets of the second order, carried a silver branch, but the Ollamhs, or chief poets, carried a branch of gold; all other poets bore a branch of bronze."

Upon returning he met the troublesome Bricriu, who gave Néde the Ollamhship in exchange for a valuable gift (a purple tunic, with its adornment of gold and silver) and told him to take the Ollamh's seat. Then Bricriu said: ‘no beardless boy receives the ollaveship of Emain Macha' - for Néde was still but a boy. So Néde plucked a handful of grass, and cast a spell upon it so that it became like a beard upon him. Then he went and sat in the Ollamh's chair and pulled his robe about him. Three colors were on the robe: a covering of bright bird's feathers in the middle, at the bottom a scattered speckling of findruine, while on the top was a brilliant golden color.

Bricriu then alerted Ferchertne, saying "It were sad, O Ferchertne, that thou shouldst be put out of the ollaveship today! A young honourable man has taken the ollaveship in Emain." This caused an angry Ferchertne to return a confront Néde, which begins the interchange.
