= Ida Daly =

American disability community leader (1901–1985)

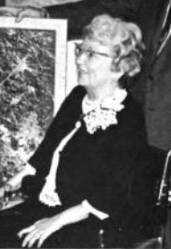
- Ida Daly, from a 1966 publication of the Bureau of Employment Security, U. S. Employment Service.
- Born: Ida May Flagler; May 10, 1901; Cedar Rapids, Iowa
- Died: April 30, 1985 (aged 83); Seattle, Washington
- Occupation: Community leader

Ida Daly (May 10, 1901 – April 30, 1985), born Ida May Flagler, was an American disability community leader from Seattle, Washington.

== Early life ==
Ida May Flagler was born in Cedar Rapids, Iowa, and raised in Lime Springs, Iowa. She was the daughter of banker Ira Loren Flagler and Della W. Flagler. At the age of 3, she was diagnosed with muscular dystrophy.

Her family moved to Spokane, Washington, because "the high school had a ramp", but she could only take classes on the first floor. She dropped out, and only finished her high school education ten years later, when an elevator was installed. She attended Washington University in St. Louis, where again her classes were restricted to the first floor. The Flagler family moved to Seattle in the 1930s and later to Central Washington, while Ida remained in Seattle.

== Career ==
Daly was a founder in 1951, and longtime director, of the Seattle Handicapped Center, "one of the first [organizations] to be both financed and operated by the disabled themselves". She edited the center's publications, Good Samaritan and The Progress, from 1953 to 1975. In the late 1950s, Daly was District 5 president of the Indoor Sports Club, a national disability organization. In 1960, she took a cross-country roadtrip with two friends, and in 1965 she traveled to Europe representing the People to People Program, to visit programs for disabled people. In 1969, Daly gave an interview about the barriers to wheelchair-using tourists in Washington, D.C.

In 1970, the Center Park Apartments for the Handicapped, an innovative seven-story residential building, opened in Seattle, after years of advocacy and extensive input by Daly. In 1973, she and her older sister Hazel Flagler Begeman co-write a book, Adventure in a Wheelchair: Pioneering for the Handicapped, about Ida Daly's life and work. Daly's contributions were recognized by the President's Commission on Employment of the Handicapped, with an award presented to her by the committee's chairman, Harold Russell.

Daly also enjoyed painting, and exhibited her works at events in Seattle.

== Personal life ==
In 1944, Ida May Flagler married pharmacist Frank Allen Wiman Daly. She was widowed when Frank Daly died in 1958, and she died in 1985, aged 83 years, in Seattle, Washington. Her papers are archived at the University of Washington. Center Park remains in operation as accessible housing, managed and maintained by the Seattle Housing Authority.
