= John Lawrence Daly =

John L. Daly (31 March 1943 – 29 January 2004) was an Australian teacher and self-declared "Greenhouse skeptic." He was known for speaking out publicly against what he called the "Global Warming scare," and authored the book The greenhouse trap: Why the greenhouse effect will not end life on earth, published in 1989 by Bantam Books. After his death until 2008, his website, Still Waiting for Greenhouse was maintained by Jerry Brennan.

Daly investigated various studies by scientists which support global warming scenarios and raised objections to them. For example, he denied that the average sea level is rising, on the basis the 'Isle of the Dead' mean ocean level benchmark.

== Beliefs ==
Daly argued that observed warming in the years leading up 2003 could be explained by the combination of a maximum in the sunspot cycle and two successive severe El Nino climatic cycles. As a result, he predicted:

But it will pass. These things always do. The solar cycle is now heading down towards its expected solar minimum around 2006, while the current El Nino is expected to wane in the next few months, possibly being replaced by its cooling counterpart, La Nina.

The greenhouse industry has thrived off Nature's climatic drama of the last 4 years, using a combination of public hysteria and bent statistics, but the pickings will be leaner in the months and years ahead - until we reach the next El Nino or the next solar maximum expected around 2012 (the same year the Kyoto Protocol expires).

== See also ==
- Global warming controversy
