= Aonghus Ruadh na nAor Ó Dálaigh =

Irish poet (1550–1617)

Aonghus Ruadh na nAor Ó Dálaigh, Irish poet, 1550–1617.

Ó Dálaigh was of the Muintir Bhaire sept, and lived at Balliorrone, County Cork.

He was employed by Sir George Carew and Mountjoy to lampoon the Irish chieftains and instigate enmity between them. The hostile reaction to his satire The Tribes of Ireland led to his assassination. According to Alice Curtayne:

"The other story is how the Deputy maliciously hired a poet named Angus O’Daly to go around among the few remaining chieftains and satirise them on their fallen estate. Few of these men were now able to maintain a poet in their household and O’Daly was glad of a job from anyone. With his pointed wit, he jibed at the MacGillicuddys for their gloom, the O’Reillys for their helplessness, the O’Sullivans for the bad wine they gave their guests. But when a servant of the O’Meaghers heard this kind of performance, he could not endure the insult to his masters. He plunged a knife in the mocker and thus ended the poet’s career."

He was survived by one son, Aonghus Óge Ó Dálaigh. Descendants of the family were still living in the area in the 1830s.
