= Joe Daly (footballer) =

English footballer

Personal information
- Full name: Joseph Daly
- Date of birth: 28 December 1897
- Place of birth: Lancaster, England
- Date of death: 1941 (aged 43–44)
- Position: Winger

Senior career*
Years	Team	Apps	(Gls)
1919–1920	Cliftonville		
1920–1927	Notts County	139	(12)
1927–1928	Northampton Town	33	(4)
1928–1930	Luton Town	70	(4)
1930–1931	Gillingham	0	(0)
1932	Notts Corinthians		
Total		242	(20)
- * Club domestic league appearances and goals

Joseph Daly (28 December 1897 – 1941) was an English footballer who played in the Football League for Luton Town, Northampton Town and Notts County.
