= Gofraidh Fionn Ó Dálaigh =

Irish poet (died 1387)

Gofraidh Fionn Ó Dálaigh (died 1387), of Duhallow, County Cork, was an Irish poet and Chief Ollamh of Ireland.

He is known to be one of the most important professional poets of fourteen-century Ireland.

== Biography ==
Gofraidh Fionn (Geoffrey the Fair) was a member of the Ó Dálaigh family of poets. He is known for his poem, Filidh Éireann go haointeach, which commemorates An Nollaig na Garma. This convention of poets and men of learning was held by Uilliam Buidhe Ó Ceallaigh of Uí Maine at his castle in County Roscommon during Christmas of 1351.

His obituary is given in the Annals of the Four Masters as follows- "M1387.4 Godfrey Finn O'Daly, Chief Poet of Ireland died."

== Selected bibliography ==
- Bean Torrach, fa Tuar Broide
- Mairg mheallas muirn an tsaoghail
- A chnuic thoir re taoibh Ealla
- A chros thall ar an dtulaigh
- A fhir théid i dTír Chonaill
- A Ghearóid, déana mo dháil
- Beir eolas dúinn, a Dhomhnuill
- Do tógbhadh meirge Murchaidh
- Fa ngníomhraidh measdar meic ríogh
- Fuirigh go fóill, a Éire
- Gaois Ailbhe i n-inghin Domhnuill
- Iongaibh thú orm, a Iarla
- Maith an locht airdríogh óige
- Teach carad do-chiu folamh

Preceded by Máel Íosa Ó Dálaigh	Chief Ollam of Ireland ?–1387	Succeeded by Cearbhall mac Lochlainn Ó Dálaigh
