= Ragnall Ua Dálaigh =

Irish poet (d. 1161)

Ragnall Ua Dálaigh, Irish poet, died 1161.

Ragnall was an early member of the Ó Dálaigh family of poets, though he does not appear on the family genealogy.

The Annals of the Four Masters note that in 1161, he was Ollamh of Desmond in poetry when he died.
