= Lochlann Óg Ó Dálaigh =

Irish poet

Lochlann Óg Ó Dálaigh, early modern Irish poet, fl. ca. 1610.

A native of Munster and a member of the Ó Dálaigh clan of poets, he wrote poetry lamenting the eclipse of the native society and culture of Ireland. Cait ar ghabhader Gaoidhil? ("Where have the Gaels gone?") he asked, and answered himself thus: "In their place we have a proud impure swarm of foreigners".

He was a son of Tadhg Óg Ó Dálaigh.
