= Aonghus Fionn Ó Dálaigh =

Irish poet

Aonghus Fionn Ó Dálaigh (known as "The Pious"), was an Irish poet, fl. 1520–1570.

Thought to have been born in County Meath, Aonghus Fionn was the head of the branch of the Ó Dálaigh family who were poets to the MacCarthy of Desmond. Only three of his poems are extant: Cionnus dhíolfad mo luach leighis?, Grian na Maighdean Máthair Dé and Ná déana díomas, a dhuine.
