= Muireadhach Albanach Ó Dálaigh =

Gaelic poet and crusader

Muireadhach Albanach Ó Dálaigh ("Scottish Muireadhach"); (c.1180–c.1250) was a Gaelic poet and crusader and member of the Ó Dálaigh bardic family.

== Early career ==
Muireadhach was born at Derryvarra in what is now County Meath, the son of Maolíosa Ó Dálaigh.

The Annals of the Four Masters tells us that in 1213 he was living in Cairbre Drom Cliabh, in what is now the north of County Sligo, as the ollamh ('high poet') of King Domhnall Ó Domhnaill (died 1241) of the O'Donnell dynasty. His life took a drastic turn after he killed his benefactor's tax-collector Fionn Ó Brolacháin, whom Muireadhach considered had been insolent, with an axe. This slaying put him on a life of exile, as he had to flee from the wrath of King Ó Domhnaill.

In a poem, Ó Dálaigh dismisses his murder as his victim was a mere commoner and therefore of no account, a telling indication of the rigid stratification of traditional Irish society:

Trifling is our difference with the man,
A shepherd was affronting me;
And I killed that clown;
O God! Is this a cause for enmity?

He first placed himself under the protection of Richard Fitzwilliam de Burgh, member of a Norman family resident in Connacht for thirty years, to whom he addressed the poem in praise of his beauty and his adoption of Gaelic culture, "Créd agaibh aoidhigh a gcéin" ("Whence comes it that you have guests from afar?").

But his former patron Ó Domhnail pursued him there, and from there to Thomond, where he had taken refuge at King Donnchadh Cairbreach Ó Briain's court. Muireadhach was expelled from the town of Limerick when O'Donnell laid siege to it. His life was protected throughout his time as a fugitive, because he was a man of learning. But he was finally banished to Scotland by the people of Dublin, with whom he had sought refuge. He remained there for more than fifteen years, making it his adopted land.

== Career in Scotland ==
It was in Scotland that Muireadhach earned his reputation, leading to his nickname of "Albanach" or "Scottish". He himself took the name Mac Muireadhaigh, and became an important figure for the cultural history of Scotland. The Scottish bard family of the MacMhuirich (or "MacVurich"), ollamhs to Clan Raghnaill claim descent from him.

Muireadhach served as the court bard to the Mormaer of Lennox. The specific mormaer who patronized him is often thought to have been Ailín II (died 1217), but as the mormaer is called "Mac Muireadhach", son of Muireadhach, it was almost certainly in fact his predecessor and father, Ailín I (died c. 1200).

Several of Muireadhach's poems are preserved in the Book of the dean of Lismore.

He wrote a poignant poem on the death of his wife, who had borne him eleven children in twenty years: "M'anam do sgar riomsa araoir" ("My soul parted from me last night"). His poem to the Virgin Mary, "Eistidh riomsa, a Mhuire Mhór" ("Hearken to me, O great Mary") is also well known.

His secular poetry exemplifies the ambivalent attitude of bardic poets to their patrons, for on the one hand he offered fulsome praise to the son of an Anglo-Norman colonist, and in a poem to the King of Connacht Cathal Crobhdearg Ua Conchobair (Cathal "Red-Handed" O'Connor) some years later he expresses a wish that Cathal would "drive eastwards the foreigners who have seized Tara".

From Scotland he wrote three poems to Ó Domhnail, pleading for forgiveness. He was eventually reconciled with him and allowed to return to Ireland in 1228 where he was given lands and possessions.

According to tradition, he ended his days in a monastery in Ireland.

His obituary in the Annals of the Four Masters describe him as ollamh Éireann agus Alban, or ollamh of Ireland and Scotland.

== The Fifth Crusade ==
Muireadhach, like his fellow Gaelic poet Gillebrìghde Albanach, went to the Holy Land during the Fifth Crusade, where he composed a poem in exile. Records have him travelled to Acre and Damietta (as well as other places, like Rome). He passed through Ireland on his return, where he wrote a poem to Murchad Ó Briain, a descendant of Brian Boru, praising his ancestry.
