= List of monastic houses in County Laois =

The smaller establishments such as monastic cells and notable monastic granges (particularly those with resident monks) and camerae of the military orders of monks (Knights Templars and Knights Hospitallers) are included. The numerous monastic hospitals per se are not included here unless at some time the foundation had, or was purported to have, the status or function of an abbey, priory, or preceptory/commandery.

== Layout ==
Communities/provenance: shows the status and communities existing at each establishment, together with such dates as have been established as well as the fate of the establishment after dissolution, and the current status of the site.

Formal name or dedication: shows the formal name of the establishment or the person in whose name the church is dedicated, where known.

Alternative names: some of the establishments have had alternative names over the course of time. In order to assist in text-searching such alternatives in name or spelling have been provided.

== Abbreviations and key ==
The sites listed are ruins or fragmentary remains unless indicated thus:
*	current monastic function
+	current non-monastic ecclesiastic function
^	current non-ecclesiastic function
=	remains incorporated into later structure
#	no identifiable trace of the monastic foundation remains
~	exact site of monastic foundation unknown
ø	possibly no such monastic foundation at location
¤	no such monastic foundation
≈	identification ambiguous or confused

Locations with names in italics indicate probable duplication (misidentification with another location) or non-existent foundations (either erroneous reference or proposed foundation never implemented).

Trusteeship denoted as follows:
NIEA	Scheduled Monument (NI)
NM	National Monument (ROI)
C.I.	Church of Ireland
R.C.	Roman Catholic Church

Foundation	Image	Communities & provenance	Formal name or dedication & alternative names	References & location
Abbeyleix Abbey^{#}		Cistercian monks — from Baltinglass founded 1183 by Corcherger O'Moore (Cucogry O’More/Connor O'More); colonized from Baltinglass 7 September 1184 dissolved before 1552?; granted to Thomas, Earl of Ormond 1563	Leix Abbey; Lex Dei	
Abbeyleix Monastery (Clonkeen)		early monastic site, founded c.600		
Addrigoole Monastery		early monastic site, nuns founded before 600? by St Finbarr of Cork; probably Augustinian nuns after 1160; dissolved c.1240, convent granted to the prioress and nuns of Kilculliheen by David Fitz Milo, Baron of Overke - no subsequent record of nuns at the convent	Addergoole; Etargabail	
Aghaboe Friary		Dominican Friars founded 1382 by Florence Mac Gilpatrick, Lord of Ossory; dissolved 1540; granted to Florence Fitzpatrick, Baron of Upper Ossory 1601	St Canice	
Aghaboe Monastery^{#}		early monastic site, founded 6th century by St Canice episcopal diocesan cathedral	Achad-Bo; Aghavoe; Athebowe; Hagevo	52°55′20″N 7°30′50″W
Aghaboe Priory		Augustinian Canons Regular founded 1382; on site of Aghaboe Monastery (see immediately above); dissolved; granted to Florence FitzPatrick c.1600		52°55′20″N 7°30′50″W
Aghmacart Monastery		early monastic site, founded 6th century	St Tigernach ____________________; Achad-maic-airt; Achad-mic-airt; Achamicaire; Hacmakarthy	
Aghmacart Priory		Augustinian Canons Regular founded before 1168?, supposedly on the site of earlier monastery (see immediately above); dissolved 1540; granted to Florence Fitzpatrick, Baron of Upper Ossory 1601	St Tigernach; St Mary ____________________; Achad-maic-airt; Achad-mic-airt; Achamicaire; Hacmakarthy; Achmacatenis; Achmecart; Ahmart; Amcart	52°49′14″N 7°30′36″W
Aghmacart parish 'Abbey', nr Glenmacoll		"Abbey (in ruins)" (Note: Ordnance Survey)		52°48′09″N 7°29′45″W
Annatrim Monastery		early monastic site, founded by St Mochoemoc (Pulcherius)	Eadcruin; Enach-truim	52°59′04″N 7°30′46″W (approx)
Ardea parish 'Friary' nr River Triogue		"Friary in ruins"		53°06′29″N 7°18′48″W (approx)
Attanagh Monastery		mentioned 1202-18 — possibly Loughill	Athenagh; Athanagh; Loughill?	
Ballylynan 'Abbey', nr Killabban parish		supposed monastic site, order, foundation and period unknown; purportedly founded by the O'More family; "Abbey in ruins"	Abbey of Shanecourt; Old Court	52°55′58″N 7°01′30″W
Clonagh 'Monastery', Killabban parish		"Monastery (in ruins)"		52°53′38″N 6°58′27″W
Clonenagh Monastery		founded 6th century by St Fintan; site now occupied by the remains of Clonenagh Church	Cluain-ednech; Cluain-eidnech; Cluain-oynach	53°00′37″N 7°25′23″W
Clonmeen Abbey		supposed monastic site, order, foundation and period unknown; "Site of Abbey"	Cluain-min	52°49′00″N 7°39′38″W
Durrow Monastery		early monastic site, founded by St Fintan Loeldubh of Dermagh in Hiduach	Durmagh-ua-nDuach; Dermagh	52°50′43″N 7°24′00″W (approx)
Dysartenos Monastery		early monastic site, founded by St Oengus between retiring from Clonenagh and prior to move to Tallaght	Disert-aengusa; Disert-enos	53°01′00″N 7°13′58″W
Dysart Gallen Monastery		early monastic site	Disert-Chuilin	52°53′35″N 7°16′18″W
Errill Monastery		early monastic site, purportedly founded 5th century by St Ciaran; "Friary (in ruins)" and "Church (in ruins)"		52°51′15″N 7°40′29″W
Kildellig Monastery		early monastic site	Cell-dellce; Kil-edelig	52°54′25″N 7°33′00″W
Kilfoelain Monastery		early monastic site, possibly in County Laois or County Offaly	Cell-faolain; Kilfoylan? (Kilmanaghan parish, County Offaly)	
Killabban Monastery		early monastic site, founded by St Abban	Cell-abbain; Kilebbane	52°55′01″N 6°58′28″W
Killermoghe Abbey		early monastic site, founded 558 by St Colmcille	Armuighe	
Killeshin Monastery		early monastic site, founded late 545 by St Comghan; burned c.1042 by mac Mael-na-mbo; burned 1077; site occupied by ruined 12th-century church (NM)	Gleane; Glenn-uissen; Glinnhussen	
Mountrath Monastery		early monastic site, monks, possibly founded 6th century by St Patrick	Muine-ratha	52°59′53″N 7°28′38″W (approx)
Mountrath Nunnery		early monastic site, monks, possibly founded 6th century by St Brigid	Muine-ratha	52°59′53″N 7°28′38″W (approx)
Oughaval Monastery		founded c.595 by St Colman of Oughaval; church in parochial use after the 12th century; modified 19th century by the Cosby family		53°00′32″N 7°08′01″W
Newtown Nunnery		purported ruins of a house of nuns, (Note: W. Carrigan, History and Antiquities of Ossory, 1905, ii) foundation, period, order and status unknown	Baile-nua; Cahir	52°50′19″N 7°27′18″W (approx)
Rathaspick Monastery		early monastic site	Raith-ne-n-epscop	
Rosenallis Monastery		founded by St Brigid of Kildare; dissolved 1537	Ros-finglas	53°08′09″N 7°24′20″W
Rostuirc Monastery		early monastic site	Rostoirc; possibly Kilbricken (Offerlane parish)	
Stradbally Abbey ^{+}		Franciscan Friars founded 1447 by Lord O'More; seized by the English c.1568; dissolved c.1569; large house built by Francis Cosby, from monastic materials; granted to Francis Cosby	Stradbaile-laoighisi; Strad-bhailelaoise; Loyes; Mon-au-bealing; Noughaval; Oughaval (q.v.)	53°00′56″N 7°08′50″W
Shrule Monastery		early monastic site, founded by late 5th century; plundered by the Osraigi 864	Sruthair-guairi; Sruthair-ghuaire	
Sleaty Monastery		early monastic site, (community founded by St Fiacc at Domnach-feic); transferred here by St Fiacc; plundered by the Osraigi 864; site occupied by remains of Sleaty Church	Slebte; Sleibte; Sletty	52°51′29″N 6°56′30″W
Tempulna Cailleachdubh		early monastic site, nuns		52°55′41″N 7°28′01″W (approx)
Timahoe Monastery		early monastic site, founded before 654 by St Mochua mac Lonan; burned 1142	Tech-mochua; Timohoe	52°57′37″N 7°12′12″W

== Map link to lists of monastic houses in Ireland by county ==
Click on a county to go to the corresponding article.	Antrim; Armagh; Down; Fermanagh; Londonderry; Tyrone; Carlow; Cavan; Clare; Cork; Donegal; Dublin; Galway; Kerry; Kildare; Kilkenny; Laois; Leitrim; Limerick; Longford; Louth; Mayo; Meath; Monaghan; Offaly; Roscommon; Sligo; Tipperary; Waterford; Westmeath; Wexford; Wicklow

== See also ==
- List of monastic houses in Ireland
