= Martyrology of Tallaght =

8th- or 9th-century Irish martyrology

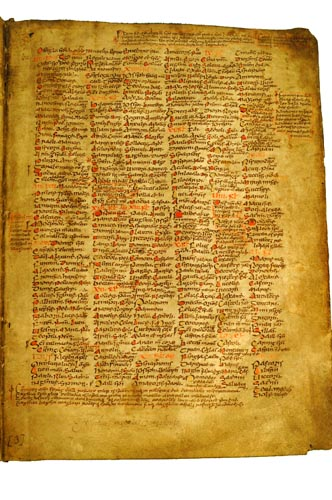
Part of the copy of the Martyrology of Tallaght separated from the Book of Leinster and now at University College Dublin

The Martyrology of Tallaght, which is closely related to the Félire Óengusso or Martyrology of Óengus the Culdee, is an eighth- or ninth-century Irish-language martyrology, a list of saints and their feast days assembled by Máel Ruain and/or Óengus the Culdee at Tallaght Monastery, near Dublin. The Martyrology of Tallaght is in prose and contains two sections for each day of the year, one general and one for Irish saints. It also has a prologue and an epilogue.

== Title and authorship ==
The earliest mention of the Martyrology of Tallaght by that name is in the 12th-century Martyrology of Gorman (Félire Uí Gormáin), written between 1166 and 1174 by Mael Muire Ua Gormáin, abbot of Knock, County Louth. Ua Gormáin attributes the Martyrology of Tallaght to Mael Ruain and says that Óengus based his work on it: "...because it was thus in the Martyrology of Tallaght of Mael Ruain, out of which he [Óengus] composed his félire".

The 17th-century scholar Michael O'Clery made a copy of the Martyrology of Tallaght, and headed it "Here begins the Martyrology of Oengus mac Oibleain and Mael Ruain", but he did not give a source for this statement.

The Franciscan John Colgan, another 17th-century scholar, pointed out that Óengus and Maelruain could not have completed the Martyrology of Tallaght as it stands, as several entries are from periods after the death of both, but he also formed the opinion that the later entries had been made at Tallaght, where Óengus and Maelruain worked together, so justifying Ua Gormáin's use of the name Martyrology of Tallaght.

Based on oral traditions and older texts, the work may have been first completed in 790. However, Pádraig Ó Riain of University College, Cork, a leading authority, has argued that the Martyrology of Tallaght and the Martyrology of Oengus date from about 830. Ó Riain has shown that the general sections of the Martyrology of Tallaght are based on a Northumbrian copy of the Martyrologium Hieronymianum.

== Manuscripts ==
The earliest surviving manuscript of the work is in a fragment of Áed Ua Crimthainn's 12th-century Book of Leinster.This consists of ten folios which had been separated from the main volume of the Book of Leinster by 1583. These came into the possession of Michael O'Clery in 1627 and were deposited at the Franciscan friary of Donegal. In 1631, the Martyrology of Tallaght folios were sent to St Anthony's at Louvain, where John Colgan added some marginalia. In the late 18th century they passed on to St Isidore's College, Rome, and in 1872 were returned from there to Ireland, to be kept first in the Franciscan convent at Merchant's Quay, Dublin, later at Dun Mhuire, Killiney. In 2000, the manuscript came into the possession of University College Dublin, where it is known as MS Franciscan A3. This 12th-century manuscript is now lacking the text for some one hundred and fifty days of the calendar, but what is missing is supplied by Michael O'Clery's 17th-century transcript.

The related Martyrology of Oengus the Culdee, which is in verse, survives in a number of other early medieval manuscripts.

== See also ==
- Óengus of Tallaght
- Suibne of Skellig

== Bibliography ==
- Best, Richard Irvine; Lawlor, Hugh Jackson, eds. (1931). The martyrology of Tallaght. Henry Bradshaw Society.
