= St. Maelruain's Church, Tallaght =

Coordinates: 53.28926°N 6.36470°W

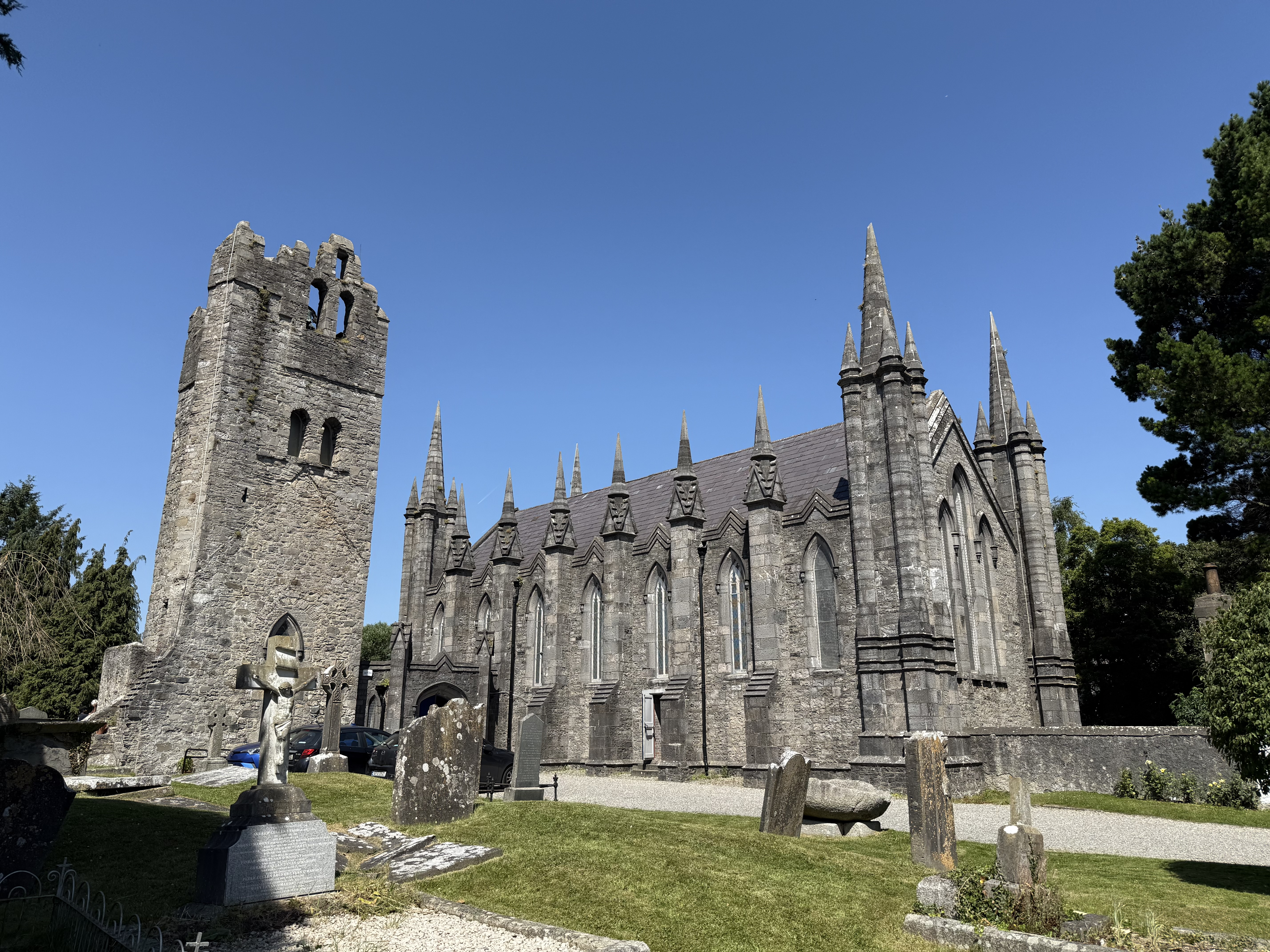
St. Maelruain's Church

St. Maelruain's Church is a church of the Church of Ireland located in Tallaght, South Dublin, Ireland. The parish is in the United Dioceses of Dublin and Glendalough. It occupies the site of the original Tallaght Monastery. The present-day church was built in 1829 on a grant of £300 by the Board of First Fruits. It replaced an earlier one to which the still-existing tower belonged. Lewis reported that that church was "in the pointed style of architecture, with pinnacles at the angles and along the sides".;

== History ==
Christian worship has continued on this site for over twelve hundred years since the Celtic saint, Maelruain, founded a monastery here in the 8th century. This monastery became an important centre of spiritual life where the Ceilí Dé (also known as Culdees, or the servants of God) had their headquarters.

In 1662, the churchwardens were granted a sum of £100 in compensation for damage done by Captain Alland who had been stationed there with his troops in 1651 during the Cromwellian invasion of Ireland. He stripped the roof of the church and used the timber, slates and pews for his own house. He also gave the paving stones to pave the entrance to his kitchen and fed his horses from the font.

In 1985, Tallaght Youth Service initiated a project whereby young unemployed people from the local area conducted a ground survey of the graves and graveyard at the church in order to provide them with "work experience which would help them gain permanent employment". Their findings were published in a booklet the following year, which also explored the history of the wider Tallaght area. The text from the gravestones was digitised in 2021.

== Features ==
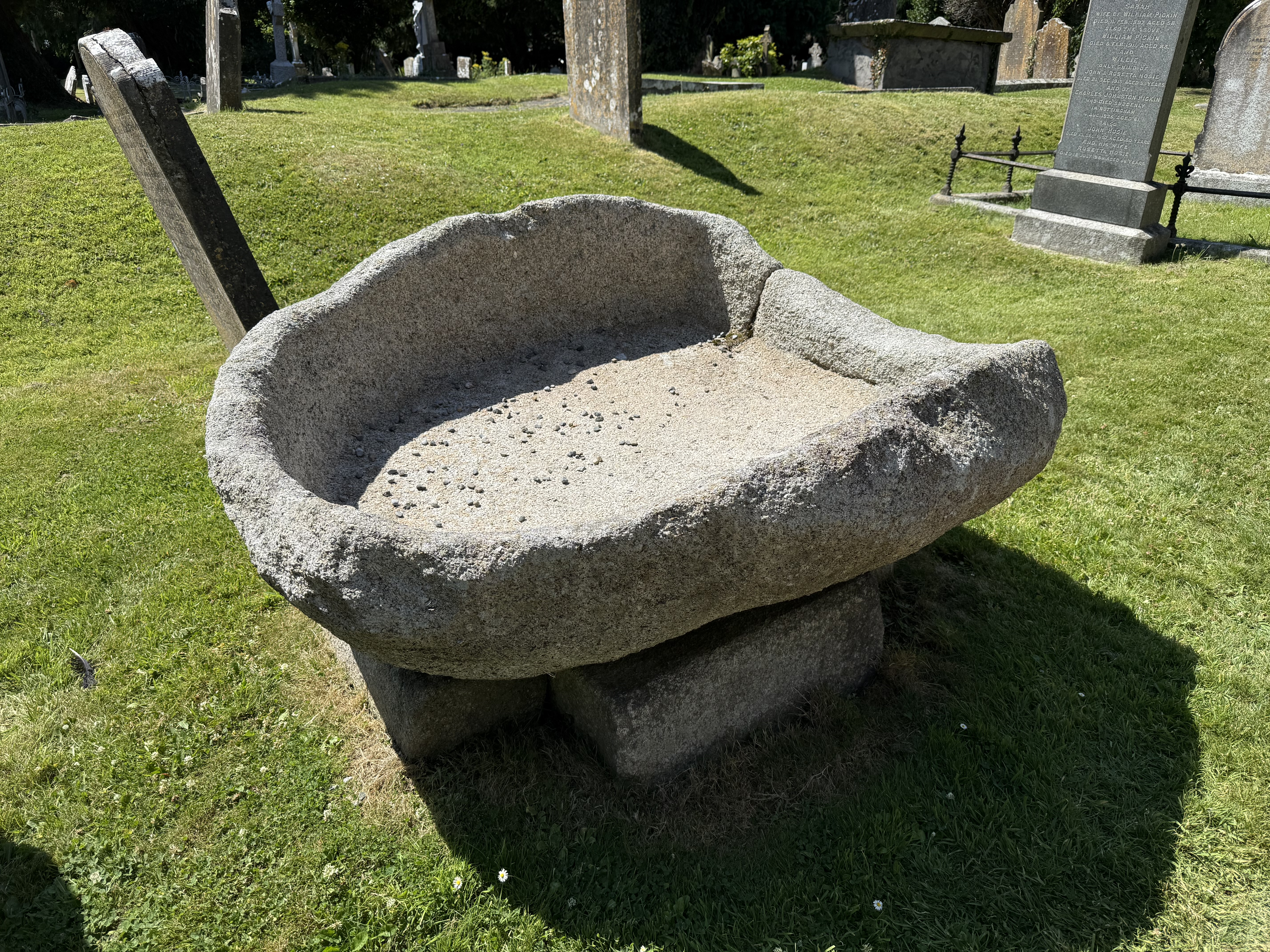
St. Maelruain's Font

This church was designed by John Semple. The spiked roofline is different from contemporary First Fruits churches. The church preserves in its dedication St. Máel Ruain who founded Tallaght Monastery. Although the monastery was on another site beside the present priory, the earlier tower of the medieval parish church is still extant. According to the "National Inventory of Architectural Heritage", the multi-period site "... of the utmost importance".

The tower is four storeys high and has a spiral staircase. An external stairs gives access to the first floor and the spiral stairway to the floors above. The third floor has a vaulted stone ceiling above which is a flat roof and a small turret. On the left inside the churchyard gate is a font called St. Maelruain's Losset. This is a wide and shallow granite stone trough or font. Losat is an Old Irish word denoting a wooden trough used in former times for kneading bread. It is likely that the country people named it from its similarity in shape to the lossets that they used in their homes.

St. Maelruain's Cross lies south of the font. It is a small ancient cross set in a pedestal which is fixed in a circular granite base resembling a mill stone. The pedestal and base were formerly known as Moll Rooney's loaf and griddle and the font was called Moll Rooney's Losset.

There are a great many tombstones in the graveyard dating mainly from the 18th and 19th centuries, and some even from the 17th century. One of these commemorates Colonel John Talbot of Belgard who sat in the Parliament of King James II of England and took part in many important military engagements. The graves of the artists Oisin Kelly, Evie Hone and Elizabeth Rivers are in the new graveyard at St. Maelruain's. A survey of the graves was carried out by South Dublin County Council which recorded, amongst other information, locations of the graves, observations on their general condition, and details taken from the grave headstones where readable.

Also buried here are The Most Rev. Dr George Otto Simms, successively Archbishop of Dublin, from 1956 to 1969, and then Archbishop of Armagh, from 1969 to 1980, and his wife, Mercy Felicia née Gwynn.

Also to be seen in the grounds of the church is the remains of the fosse, the ancient curved bank which enclosed Maelruain's monastery. The best view is from the car park at the rear of Smith's Toystore.

== Sources ==
- Smith, Martin; Gough, Judy; Sheridan, Domhnall; Dunne, Olive; Sullivan, Helena; Naughton, Yvette; Flanagan, Paula; Duffy, Kelvin; Pujolas, Paul (1986). Allen, Regina (ed.). St. Maelruans and Tallaght. Tallaght: Tallaght Chamber of Commerce / Department of Labour Teamwork Project.
- Smith, Martin; Gough, Judy; Sheridan, Domhnall; Dunne, Olive; Sullivan, Helena; Naughton, Yvette; Flanagan, Paula; Duffy, Kelvin; Pujolas, Paul (2021). Allen, Regina (ed.). Transcription of burials in St. Maelruain's Churchyard digitised from printed St. Maelruain's Teamwork Project. Tallaght: Tallaght Chamber of Commerce / Department of Labour Teamwork Project.
