= Óengus of Tallaght =

Irish bishop, reformer and writer

Saint Óengus of Tallaght
- Born: unknown Clonenagh, Spahill, County Laois, Ireland
- Died: possibly 11 March 824
- Venerated in: Catholic Church
- Feast: 11 March

Óengus mac Óengobann, better known as Saint Óengus of Tallaght or Óengus the Culdee, was an Irish bishop, reformer and writer, who flourished in the first quarter of the 9th century and is held to be the author of the Félire Óengusso ("Martyrology of Óengus") and possibly the Martyrology of Tallaght.

Little of Óengus's life and career is reliably attested. The most important sources include internal evidence from the Félire, a later Middle Irish preface to that work, a biographic poem beginning Aíbind suide sund amne ("Delightful to sit here thus") and the entry for his feast-day inserted into the Martyrology of Tallaght.

== Background ==
Óengus was known as a son of Óengoba and grandson of Oíblén, who is mentioned in a later genealogy as belonging to the Dál nAraidi, a ruling kindred in the north-east of Ireland. A late account prefaced to the Martyrology asserts that Óengus was born in Clúain Édnech/Eidnech (Clonenagh, Spahill, County Laois, Ireland), not far from the present town of Mountrath, and brought up at the monastic school founded there by Fintan of Clonenagh, where also his body was buried. The claim may be spurious since the Félire itself accords no such importance to the monastic foundation or its patron saint Fintan.

Óengus describes himself as a cleric in the Félire, using the more humble appellation of "pauper" (pauperán and deidblén in Old Irish). He was an important member of the community founded by Máel Ruain at Tallaght (now in South Dublin), in the borderlands of Leinster. Máel Ruain is described as his mentor (aite, also "foster father"). Óengus is first described as a bishop in a list of saints inserted into the Martyrology of Tallaght.

== Writings ==
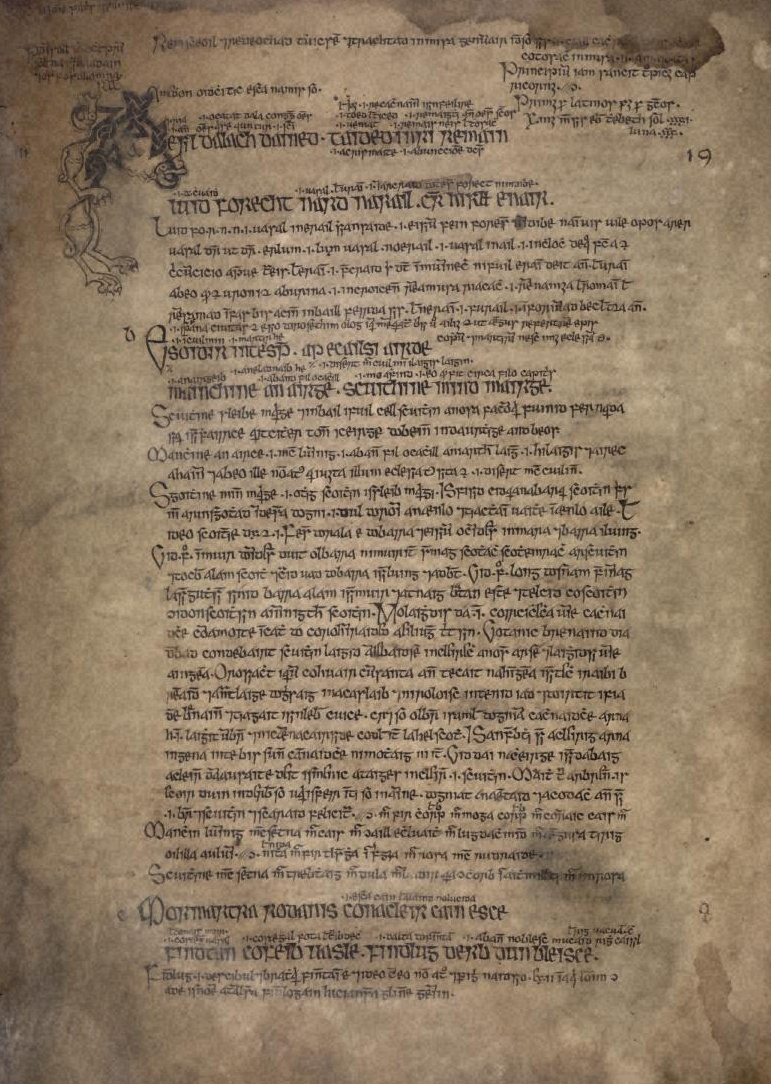
Excerpt from the Martyrology of Oengus, presenting the entries for 1 and 2 January in the form of quatrains of four six-syllabic lines for each day.

=== Félire Óengusso ===
The literary effort most commonly attributed to Óengus is the Old Irish work known as Félire Óengusso ("Martyrology of Óengus"), which is the earliest metrical martyrology — a register of saints and their feast days – to have been written in the vernacular. The work survives in at least ten manuscripts, the earliest being Leabhar Breac of the early 15th century.

The martyrology proper consists of 365 quatrains, one for each day of the year, and is framed between a lengthy prologue and epilogue. Later scribes added a prose preface, including material on Óengus, and accompanied the text with abundant glosses and scholia. Óengus's principal source was the Martyrology of Tallaght, an abbreviated version in prose of the Martyrologium Hieronymianum, but with a multitude of Irish saints added to their respective feast days. Other sources are given in the epilogue as an "antigraph of Jerome, the martyrology of Eusebius" and "Ireland's host of books."

==== Dating the calendar ====
The precise date of the original composition has proved difficult to ascertain. The usual method of determining a terminus post quem has been to argue from the careers of saints and kings referred to in the text, many of whom remain obscure. The terminus ante quem is a different game. In view of the selective nature of the Félire, arguments from silence have little to recommend it, at least in individual cases. What would have been instructive, the year of Óengus's death, is unknown, but his education by Máel Ruain (d. 792) must at least mean that he did not outlive the 9th century.

The one thing that is usually accepted is that it was written no earlier than 797, when one of the rulers described in the prologue as having deceased, Donnchad mac Domnaill, king of Tara, died. Rudolf Thurneysen postulated a date before 808 on grounds that the reference to the death of Bran Ardchenn mac Muiredaig (d. probably 795), king of Leinster, should be attributed to political sympathies in the reign of his successor Fínsnechta mac Cellaig (d. 808).

Ó Riain, however, has rejected the traditional date (797 x 808) in favour of a later range, between 828 and 833, while more recently, Dumville has cast doubt on Ó Riain's conclusions and dating methods. First, Ó Riain argues that such sympathies as Thurneysen refers to are pertinent only to the next kings in the royal line, Cellach mac Brain (r. 829–834) and Conchobar mac Donnchada (r. 819–833), sons of Bran and Donnchad respectively. Dumville objects that this political argument glosses over the probability that while Bran and Donnchad gave way to overlords from rival dynasties, they were nevertheless succeeded by members of their family in their own tuatha or mórthuatha. The inclusion of these kings in the prologue, therefore, offers no good reason to move up the terminus ante quem. Second, Ó Riain sees reason to identify the saints Airerán (11 August), Modímóc (10 December) and Flann (14 January) with Airfhinnán (d. 803), abbot of Tallaght, Dímmán of Araid (d. 811) and Flann mac Fairchellaig (d. 825), abbot of Lismore. Dumville, however, points out several weaknesses and concludes with Stokes "that no saint or other person who certainly died in the ninth century is mentioned." Third, having identified a number of saints in the Martyrology of Tallaght, the primary model for the Félire, he proposes obits extending to that of Teimnén or Temnán of Linn Duachaill, who died in 828. In Dumville's view, the evidence is ambiguous, since the relationship of the extant copies of the Martyrology of Tallaght to the lost original which served as the source for the Félire is yet unclear. Liam Breatnach has also supported Thurneysen's date.

==== Centres of worldly and spiritual power ====
Something of Óengus' view on secular politics appears to come through in his prologue to the Félire. In several stanzas, the deserted sites of Tara, Crúachan (also Crúachu) and Emain Machae are interpreted as the former sites of fortresses in which powerful rulers resided before the coming of Christianity. These pagan seats of power are contrasted with the great ecclesiastical centres of Ireland which were flourishing in Óengus' own time, such as Armagh and Clonmacnoise. According to the historian T.M. Charles-Edwards, Óengus was responding to the military domination of overlords of his day, commenting that worldly glory is transient, while spiritual power is enduring. To similar effect, Óengus also holds up the example of Máel Ruain, who continues to offer support and comfort after his death, against that of the contemporary warrior-kings Donnchadh and Bran Ardchenn, whose strong exercise of power meant no such thing after theirs.

=== Martyrology of Tallaght ===
It has been suggested that Óengus was actively involved in the compilation if not the composition of the augmented Martyrology of Tallaght. This was a work of Northumbrian provenance, probably from Lindisfarne, which first passed through Iona and Bangor, where Irish scribes began to make some additions. The manuscript (now lost) finally arrived in Tallaght, where it received the majority of its Irish additions. It was written by someone of Óengus's learning and literary skill at Tallaght and there are strong indications that this was Óengus himself: first of all, the sources named by Óengus in the epilogue to the Félire (see above) would make more sense if these were the materials used for the Martyrology of Tallaght; second, a number of saints whom the same epilogue claims to have included are found in the Martyrology of Tallaght, but not in the actual Félire.

== Death ==
According to the Martyrology of Tallaght, Óengus's feast day, and hence the date of his death, is 11 March. The poem beginning Aíbind suide sund amne claims that he died on a Friday in Dísert Bethech ("The Birchen Hermitage"). Together, these have produced a range of possible dates such as 819, 824 and 830, but pending the dates of the martyrologies, no conclusive answer can be offered. His metrical Life tells that he was buried in his birthplace Clonenagh.

== Reputation ==
Becoming a hermit, he lived for a time at Disert-beagh, where, on the banks of the Nore, he is said to have communed with the angels. From his love of prayer and solitude, he was named the "Culdee"; in other words, the Ceile Dé, or "Servant of God." Not satisfied with his hermitage, which was only a mile from Clonenagh, and, therefore, liable to be disturbed by students or wayfarers, Óengus removed to a more solitary abode eight miles distant. This sequestered place, two miles southeast of the present town of Maryborough, was called after him "the Desert of Óengus", or "Dysert-Enos". Here he erected a little oratory on a gentle eminence among the Dysert Hills, now represented by a ruined and deserted Protestant church. He is also claimed to have founded Dísert Óengusa near to Croom, c. AD 780. Two of the reformed communities of Tallaght, monasteries in County Limerick and County Laois founded in Óengus's lifetime, are known as Dísert Óengusa ("Óengus's Hermitage").

His earliest biographer in the ninth century relates the wonderful austerities practised by Óengus in his "desert", and though he sought to be far from the haunts of men, his fame attracted a stream of visitors. The result was that the good saint abandoned his oratory at Dysert-Enos, and, after some wanderings, came to the monastery of Tallaght, near Dublin, then governed by Máel Ruain. He entered as a lay brother, concealing his identity, but Máel Ruain soon discovered him and collaborated with him on the Martyrology of Tallaght.
