= Áed Ua Crimthainn =

12th-century abbot and coarb of Terryglass, Ireland

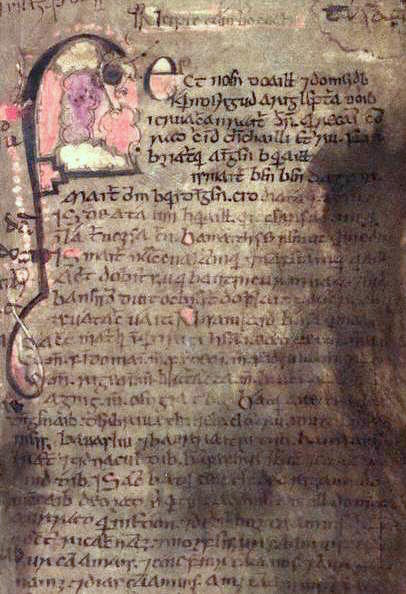
Folio 53 of the Book of Leinster

Áed Ua Crimthainn (fl. 12th century), also called Áed mac Crimthainn, was abbot and coarb of Terryglass (Tir dá Glas), near Lough Derg in County Tipperary, Ireland. He was the principal scribe of the Book of Leinster (Middle Irish: Lebar na Núachongbhála), the Book of Oughaval, an important Middle Irish medieval illuminated manuscript, and is also believed to have been its sole compiler.

Áed signed himself Áed Ua Crimthainn.

== Life and work ==
Áed was a scholar and a descendant of an old ecclesiastical family of County Laois who were the comarbai (heirs) of Colum moccu Loigse, the 6th century founder of the religious house of Terryglass and a friend of Colum Cille. He was the temporal, if not the spiritual, head of Terryglass, succeeding Finn mac maic Chélechair Ui Cheinnéidig, who died in 1152. It seems that Áed himself had no successor and was the last coarb, as Terryglass was burned down in 1164 and was then dissolved by reforms later in the century.

Áed was a friend of Finn mac Gussáin Ua Gormáin, bishop of Kildare and abbot of Newry, who sometimes collaborated with him. Both Finn and Gilla na Náem Úa Duinn assisted Áed with compiling the Book of Leinster.

According to a note in the Book of Leinster, "Áed Ua Crimthainn wrote the book and collected it from many books". It is a literary compendium of stories, poetry, and history, and it appears from annals included in it that it was written between 1151 and 1201, although largely completed by the 1160s. The last entry in the manuscript in Áed's hand which can be dated appears to belong to the year 1166. Gerald of Wales saw the book when he accompanied his cousin Strongbow on his invasion of Ireland and said of its illuminations that they were "the work of Angels".

Áed was probably the court historian of Diarmait Mac Murchada. In the Book of Leinster, he was apparently the first scholar to create the concept of the rí Érenn co fressabra, the "king of Ireland with opposition", later more widely adopted. This described Diarmait's ambitions and the achievements of his great-grandfather Diarmait mac Maíl na mBó. Áed's description of the period between the death of Máel Sechnaill mac Domnaill and the rise of Diarmait mac Maíl na mBó was misread by Conall Macgeoghegan when he compiled the so-called Annals of Clonmacnoise in the 17th century, leading to the inclusion of poet Cuán Ua Lothcháin and abbot Corcrán Clérech in some old lists of High Kings of Ireland.

A letter from Bishop Finn to Áed was copied into the Book of Leinster, at folio 206, by one of the other hands of the manuscript. This has been called the oldest surviving personal letter to have been written in Ireland, although this ignores earlier correspondence between Irish bishops and the archbishops of Canterbury. The letter reads:

Betha 7 slainte o Fhind epscop (.i. Cilli Dara) do Aed mac Crimthainn do fhir leigind ardrid Leithi Moga (.i. Nuadat) 7 do chombarbu Cholumim meic Crimthaind 7 do phrimsenchaid Laigen ar gaes 7 eolas 7 trebaire lebur 7 fessa 7 foglomma 7 scribthar dam deired in sceoil bisce

cu cinte duit a Aed amnais a fhir cosinn aeb ollmais cian gar dom beith it hingnais mían dam do bit him comgnais Tucthar dam duanaire Meic Lonain co faiccmis a cialla na nduan dilet ann. Et Uale in Christo

Life and health from Finn, bishop (i.e. of Kildare) to Áed mac Crimthainn, lector of the high king of Leth Moga, and coarb of Colum son of Crimthainn, and prime historian of Leister in wisdom and knowledge and book lore, and science and learning. And let the conclusion of this little tale be written for me. You may be certain, o keen Áed, o man of great beauty, whether I be a long or a short time without you I would like you to be with me. Let the poem book of Mac Lonáin be brought to me so that we may study the meanings of the poems that are in it, et vale in Christo.

Áed respected Irish tradition, even when it offended his religious beliefs or his educated sense of reason. However, at the end of the Book of Leinster, the writer added this reservation:

But I, who have written this history, or rather fable, give no credence to the various incidents related in it. For some things in it are the deceptions of demons, others poetic inventions; some are probable, others improbable; while still others are included for the delight of fools.
