= Tallaght Monastery =

Former monastery founded in the eighth century in Tallaght, Ireland

Tallaght Monastery (Latin: Monasterium Tamlactense) was a Christian monastery founded in the eighth century by Máel Ruain, at a site called Tallaght, a few miles south west of present-day Dublin, Ireland. It operated until the Protestant Reformation.

== Founding ==
Tallaght was founded in AD 769 by Máel Ruain, a leader in the Culdee movement in Ireland. The monastery included Round Towers, which served as bell towers and/or a repository for the relics Mael Ruian had brought with him, reportedly relics of Saints Paul and Peter and hair of the Virgin Mary.

The word tallaght is a variant of the Irish word Tamlachta, which originates in the combination of the words tam (plague) and lecht (stone monument). The name memorializes a plague said to have occurred in Ireland in A.M. 2820, a plague so vast that 9,000 persons in Parthálon’s colony are said to have died in one week, all the dead being buried in one mass grave covered over with stones. The existence of ancient tumuli in the vicinity are sometimes offered as evidence of the truth of the legend, though archaeologists have yet to discover any evidence of a mass grave.

== The Community ==
Máel Ruin’s companions at Tallaght included the Ulsterman Oengus and Máel Dithruib, two well-known figures in the Culdee movement. The names of four others at Tallaght are also known: Airennan, Eochaid, Joseph, and Dichull, all of whom are now considered saints in the Catholic tradition.

== Center of learning ==
Tallaght became a center of learning in the ninth century. Two of the major works produced there were martyrologies, one by Máel Ruain and one by Oengus. In addition, life at the monastery was chronicled in a text now referred to as the Tallaght Memoir, probably completed by AD 840.

Another product of the Tallaght monastery was the Stowe Missal, a work which emphasized the importance of community over individualism. After the death of Máel Ruain, the Stowe Missal was carried by Máel Dithruib to the monastery at Terryglass.

== Daily life ==
The Rule of the monastery was similar to, and probably based on, that of the Abbey of Saint-Arnould at Metz under Bishop Chrodegang. Food was to be modest and lightly consumed to avoid gluttony, and drink was taken in moderation. The author of the Tallaght Memoir said that the monks rarely drank or ate meat, but they did serve meat to guests.

== History ==
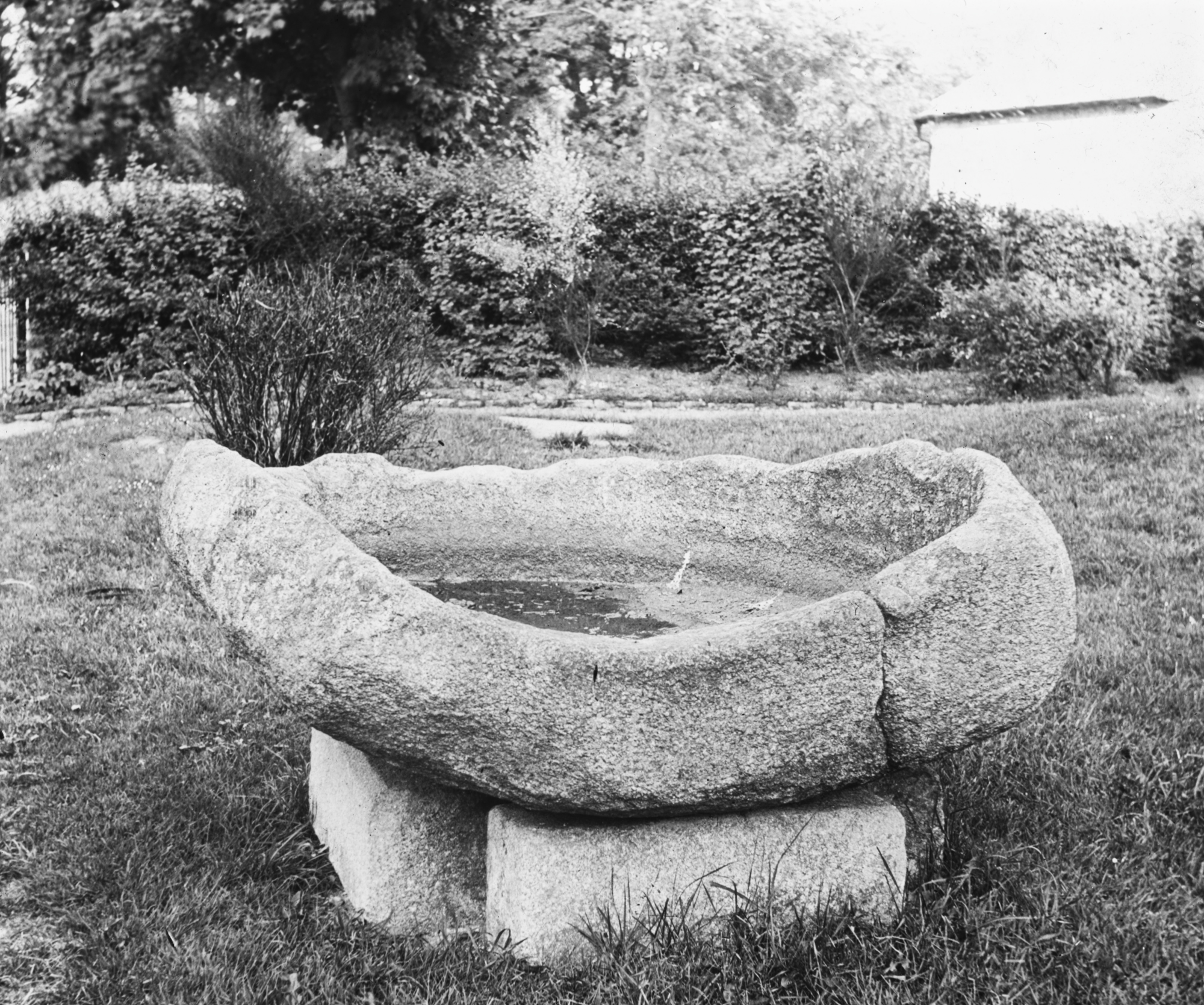
St. Maelruan's Font, Tallaght, Co. Dublin

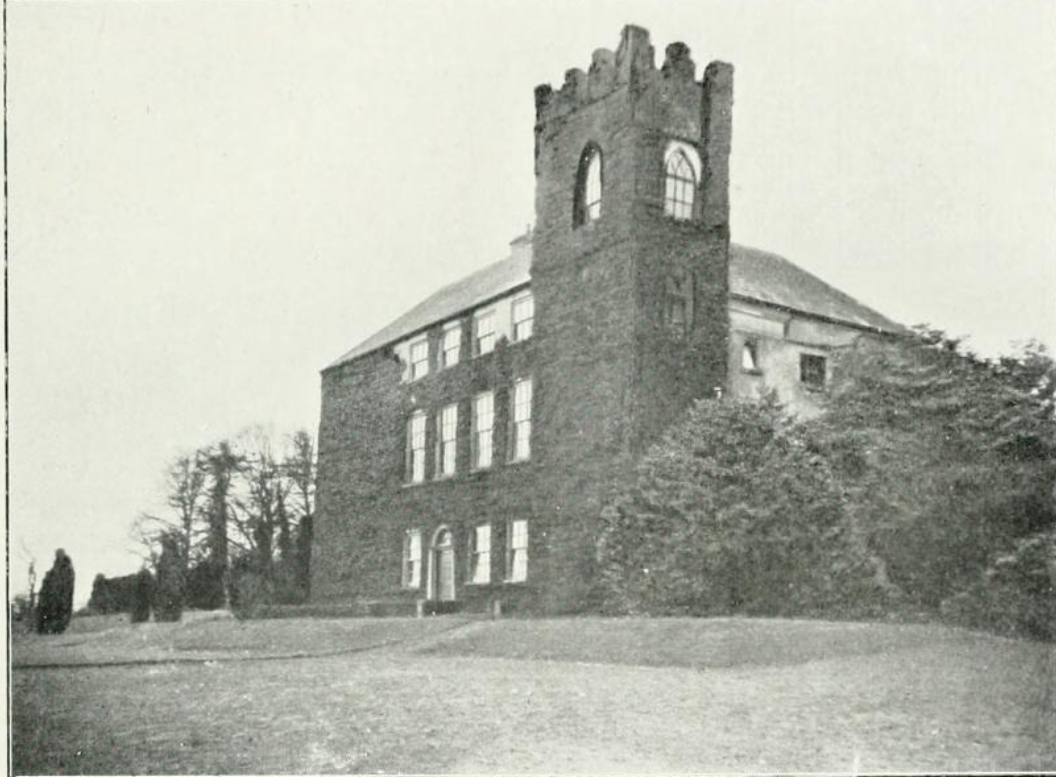
Belgard Castle

The site of the monastery was given to Máel Ruain "in honour of God and St. Michael" by Cellach (d. 18 July, 771) of Ui Donnchada, grandson of a Leinster king, Donogh (d. 726). The monastery withstood an attack by Vikings in AD 811 and survived as a discrete entity to the time of the Anglo-Norman invasion of 1169.

Subsequent to the turmoil of that period, Pope Alexander III issued a bull dated 20 April 1179, by which Tallaght, along with its subsidiary chapels of Killohan and St. Bride’s, was united to the Archdiocese of Dublin. Then, in 1223, Archbishop Henry de Loundres attached the deanery of Tallaght to St. Patrick’s Cathedral in Dublin. Gradually, the town of Tallaght grew up around the monastery, and the English-appointed archbishop of Dublin, built (or possibly restored) a palace there. In 1324, the palace was fortified to protect the English in Tallaght from the marauding O’Byrne clan, exposing a need for protection and triggering the building of an Anglo-Norman castle, Belgard, just to the east of the monastery site. In 1324 Alexander de Bicknor built or restored an archepiscopal manor at Tallaght, which was fortified later to protect the English in Dublin from the attacks of the O'Byrnes.

During the Dissolution of the monasteries at the Reformation, the Protestant archbishops took charge of Tallaght. However, in 1812, the castle was sold to the Dominicans, who erected a Catholic novitiate and church there. The Dominican Retreat Center stands on the site today.

The monastery having deteriorated in the seventeenth century, the archbishop had it torn down in 1729, replacing it with an archiepiscopal residence. The tower is all that remains of the castle.

Only two reminders of the ancient monastery are visible today, both of which were roughly carved from granite boulders: an immense font, five feet in diameter, and a three-foot tall cross, referred to as St. Máelruain’s Cross. Today the site is the location of St. Máelruain’s Church of Ireland, which was built in 1829. The church, along with the Dominican Retreat Center, make Tallaght the site of Christian worship for nearly 1,300 years.

== See also ==
- List of abbeys and priories in Ireland (County Dublin)
