= Battle of Bothaville =

1900 battle of the Second Boer War

- Part of Second Boer War
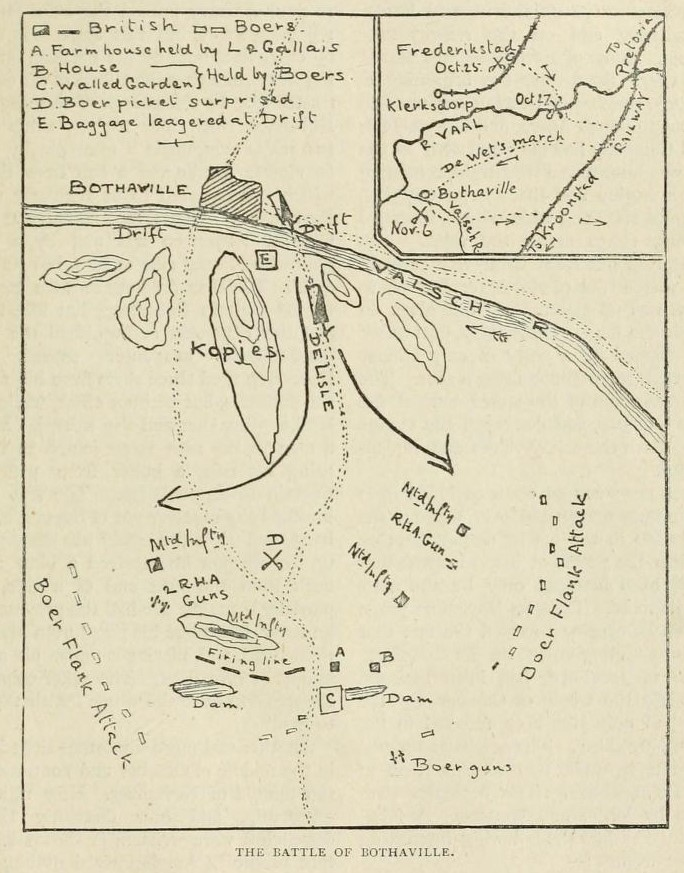
- Plan of the battle of Bothaville (Battles of the nineteenth century, 1901)
Date	6 November 1900
Location	Bothaville, South Africa 27°23′S 26°37′E
Result	British victory

Belligerents
United Kingdom	Orange Free State

Commanders and leaders
Lt-Col. P. W. J. Le Gallais †	Christiaan de Wet

Strength
600, considerably reinforced after 4 hours	800

Casualties and losses
38 killed or wounded	25 killed, 30 wounded, 114 men, 6 field guns & 1 pom pom captured

The Battle of Bothaville (Doornkraal) on 6 November 1900 was a rare defeat of Christiaan de Wet's Boer commando at the hands of a force of British Mounted Infantry (MI).

== Battle ==
De Wet was one of the most successful Boer commanders of the Second Boer War, disrupting British supply lines almost with impunity. On 6 November, De Wet camped at Bothaville on the Valsch River with 800 Orange Free State commandos. His party included the president of the Free State, Marthinus Steyn. De Wet was aware that Maj. Gen. Charles Knox's greatly superior British all-arms force was camped 7 miles (11 km) away and believed that his outposts would give him adequate warning of any enemy moves. What he did not know was that the men at his main outpost had fallen asleep.

Shortly after dawn, right after De Wet received a reassuring report from a scout, Knox's 600-man advance guard, the 5th and 8th MI under Lieutenant-Colonel P. W. J. Le Gallais appeared only 300 yards (270 m) from the Boer camp. For once, De Wet was surprised and a panic ensued in the Boer camp. Because his adjutant had kept a horse saddled, President Steyn was able to escape. The bulk of De Wet's commando fled for their lives on horseback, but a hard core of about 150 men stayed behind and fought it out with the MI. The two sides went to ground or occupied farm buildings and blazed away with rifles and even field guns at close range. "The heroism displayed on both sides made it one of the most ferocious and gruesome little actions of the war."

The battle went on for four hours before Knox belatedly showed up with his infantry force. At that point, one surviving officer, Major William Hickie, led the MI in a bayonet charge. This quickly produced a Boer surrender. The MI wanted to shoot two Boers who were found with dum-dum bullets, but Knox humanely stopped this. To the irritation of the MI officers, Knox and his staff seemed preoccupied with dividing the spoils in the captured Boer camp. There was no pursuit.

== Aftermath ==
The Boers lost 25 killed and about 130 captured, including 30 men wounded. De Wet also had to abandon four Krupp field guns, a pom pom, and two artillery pieces captured from the British at the battles of Colenso and Sanna's Post. British losses were also serious: about 38 men either wounded or killed in action. Le Gallais died that night of his wounds. Lieutenant-Colonel Wally Ross of the 8th MI was severely wounded in the face. Because of Knox's failure to pursue, most of De Wet's force got away intact and soon began operating against British garrisons and supply convoys again. A furious Hickie wrote, "The General is an old woman... If Knox had the same dash as Le Gallais we should have taken the whole lot, bagged the whole crowd." Serious losses of materiel had also been inflicted on the Boers, including six field-guns, a Maxim gun and a pom-pom, all de Wet's wagons carrying gun and small-arms ammunition as well as clothing and other supplies. Despite this, de Wet remained in the field and, within a fortnight, struck back at the British at the head of 1,500 burghers.
