= William Hickie =

British Army general and Irish politician (1865–1950)

Major-General Sir William Hickie KCB FRGS
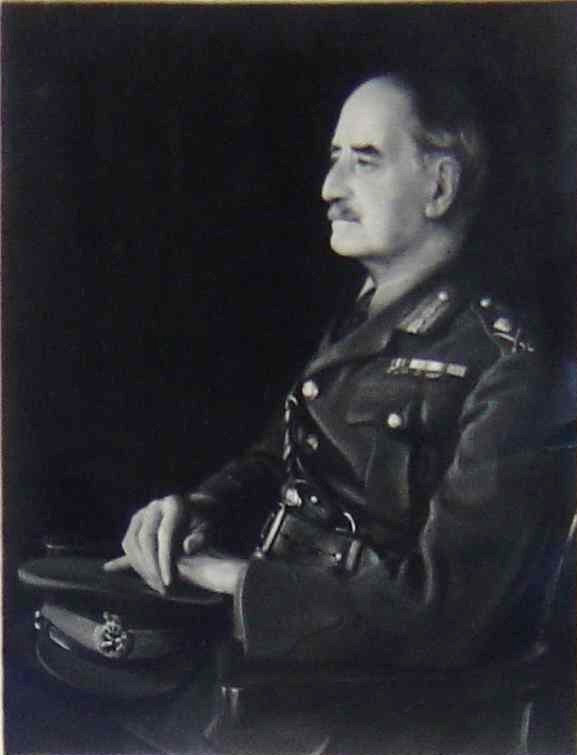
- Born: 21 May 1865; Terryglass, County Tipperary, Ireland
- Died: 3 November 1950 (aged 85); Dublin, Ireland
- Burial place: Terryglass, County Tipperary
- Military career
- Allegiance: United Kingdom
- Branch: British Army
- Service years: 1885–1922
- Rank: Major-General
- Unit: Royal Fusiliers
- Commands: 16th (Irish) Division; 53rd Brigade; 13th Brigade
- Conflicts: Second Boer War: Battle of Bothaville; World War I: Battle of Loos; Battle of Guillemont; Battle of Ginchy; Battle of the Somme; Battle of Messines; Battle of Passchendaele; Battle of Cambrai
- Awards: Knight Commander of the Order of the Bath

Senator
- In office 17 September 1925 – 29 May 1936

Personal details
- Party: Independent

Major-General Sir William Bernard Hickie, KCB, FRGS (21 May 1865 – 3 November 1950) was an Irish-born senior British Army officer and an Irish nationalist politician.

As a British Army officer Hickie saw active service in the Second Boer War from 1899 to 1902; was Assistant Quartermaster General in the Irish Command from 1912 to 1914, and served in World War I from 1914 to 1918. He commanded a brigade of the British Expeditionary Force in 1914 and was commander of the 16th (Irish) Division from 1915 on the Western Front.

== Family ==
William Hickie was born on 21 May 1865, at Slevoir, Terryglass, near Borrisokane, County Tipperary, the eldest of the eight children of Colonel James Francis Hickie (1833–1913) and his wife Lucila Larios y Tashara (died 1880), originally of Castile. From a long soldierly line and famous Gaelic stock, Hickie's name is best remembered as one of the notable Irishmen who served during World War I. Two of his four brothers also served, one as a major in the Royal Artillery before becoming a priest. His sister Dolores married Henry Hugh Peter Deasy, founder of the Deasy Motor Car Company. Hickie was educated at St Mary's College, Oscott, Birmingham, a renowned seminary for training youths of prosperous Roman Catholic families.

== Early military career ==
Hickie attended the Royal Military College, Sandhurst, from 1882 to 1885. He was commissioned as a lieutenant into his father's regiment, the Royal Fusiliers, at Gibraltar, in February 1885, in the same class as Douglas Haig, a future field marshal. He served with his regiment for thirteen years in the Mediterranean, in Egypt, and in India, during which time he was promoted to captain on 18 November 1892.

In 1899 he graduated at the Staff College, Camberley and was selected when the Second Boer War broke out later that year as a special service officer, in which capacity he acted in various positions of authority and command. He left Southampton for South Africa on board the SS Canada in early February 1900, and was promoted from captain of mounted infantry to battalion command as major on 17 March 1900. He was subsequently in command of a corps until eventually at the end of 1900 he was given command of an independent column of all arms. This he held for eighteen months. He served with distinction at the Battle of Bothaville in November 1900, and received the brevet promotion to lieutenant colonel on 29 November 1900. From March 1902 he was a staff officer at Kroonstad. He served in South Africa throughout the war, which ended with the Peace of Vereeniging in June 1902. Four months later he left Cape Town on the SS Salamis with other officers and men of the 2nd Battalion, Royal Fusiliers, arriving at Southampton in late October, when the battalion was posted to Aldershot.

In December 1902 he was elected a Fellow of the Royal Geographical Society (FRGS).

After the end of the war in South Africa there followed various staff appointments, the first from December 1902 as deputy assistant adjutant general for the district staff in the Cork District. He was promoted to brevet colonel in November 1906. On 28 November 1909 he was promoted to lieutenant colonel and was back in regimental service in Dublin and Mullingar with the 1st Battalion, Royal Fusiliers, where he was in command of the regiment for the last two years. From 1909 to 1912 was appointed to the staff of the 8th Division in Cork where for four years he was well known in the hunting field and on the polo ground. In March 1912, he was promoted to colonel, and became quartermaster-general of the Irish Command at Royal Hospital Kilmainham for which he was later appointed a Companion of the Order of the Bath.

== World War I ==
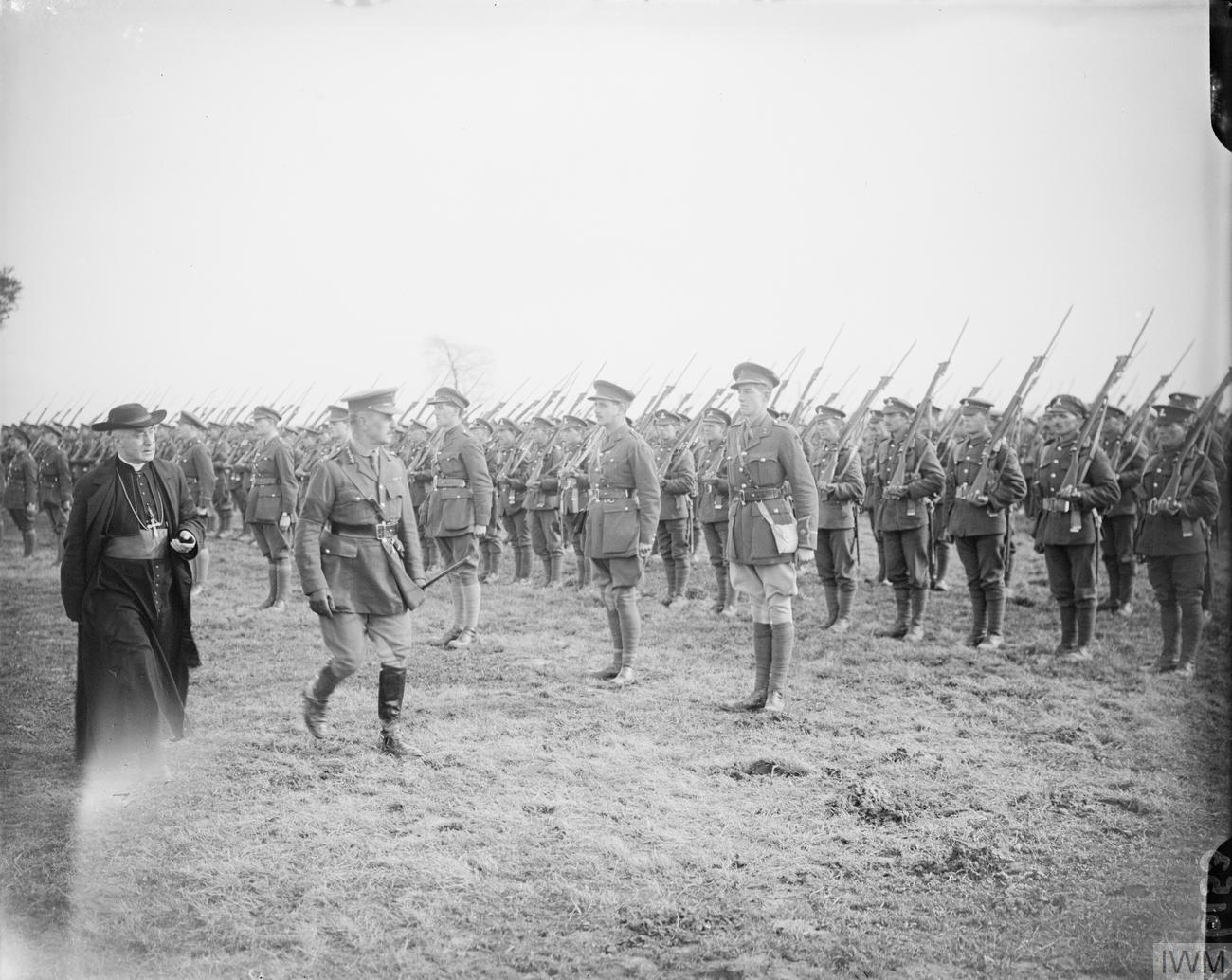
Cardinal Francis Bourne, the Head of the Catholic Church in England and Wales, and Major-General Hickie, GOC 16th (Irish) Division, inspecting troops of the 8th/9th Battalion, Royal Dublin Fusiliers at Ervillers, France, 27 October 1917.

When war was declared the Staff of the Irish Command became automatically the staff of the II Army Corps and accordingly with the outbreak of World War I in August 1914, he was promoted to the temporary rank of brigadier general, and as part of the British Expeditionary Force (BEF) in France took charge of the adjutant and quartermaster-general's department during the retreat of the II Corps after the Battle of Mons, to Paris, and during the Battle of the Marne. In the middle of September 1914, he relieved one of the brigadiers in the fighting line, Gerald Cuthbert, as commander of the 13th Infantry Brigade, part of the 5th Division. He was in command until 14 January 1915 when he relinquished his brigade and temporary rank, reverting to colonel, and being placed on half-pay although this date was later amended to 24 February.

He then commanded the 53rd Infantry Brigade of the 18th (Eastern) Division and was once again granted the temporary rank of brigadier general while holding his appointment, on 21 April 1915.

He was in command until December 1915, when he was ordered home to assume command of the 16th (Irish) Division at Blackburn.

Promoted to the temporary rank of major general that same month, Hickie took over from the much older Lieutenant General Sir Lawrence Parsons. Hickie – one of a rare breed, a senior, Irish, Catholic officer – was a popular replacement. It was politically a highly sensitive appointment which required the professionalism and political awareness Hickie, fortunately, possessed as the division was formed around a core of Irish National Volunteers in response to Sir Edward Carson's Ulster Volunteers. He was much more diplomatic and tactful than his predecessors and spoke of the pride which his new command gave him, but did not hesitate to make sweeping changes amongst the senior officers of the 16th Division. After putting the division through intensive training, it left under Irish command, of which each man took personal pride. It arrived in France in December 1915.

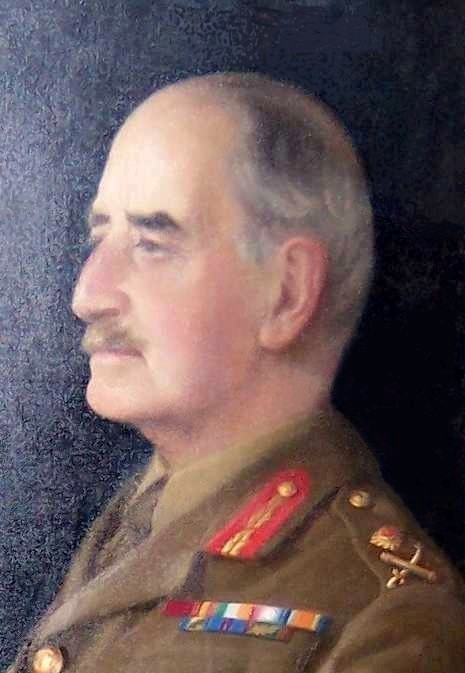
Major-General Hickie

In the next two years and four months during which Hickie, who in January 1917 was promoted to the permanent rank of major general, commanded the 16th (Irish) Division, it earned a reputation for aggression and élan and won many memorials and mentions for bravery in the engagements during the 1916 Battle of Guillemont and the capture of Ginchy (both of which formed part of the Battle of the Somme), then during the Battle of Messines, in appalling conditions the Battle of Passchendaele and in attacks near Bullecourt in the Battle of Cambrai offensive in November 1917.

During this period the division made considerable progress in developing its operational techniques but at a price in losses. The growing shortage of Irish replacement recruits (due to nationalist disenchantment with the war and the absence of conscription in Ireland) was successfully met by Hickie by integrating non-Irish soldiers into the division.

In February 1918, Hickie was invalided home on temporary sick leave, but when in the hospital the German spring offensive began on 21 March, with the result that after his division moved under the command of Lieutenant General Hubert Gough, commander of the British Fifth Army, it was practically wiped out and ceased to exist as a division. Although promised a new command, this did not happen before the war finally ended due to the armistice with Germany in November. Hickie had typified the army's better divisional commanders, was articulate, intelligent and had been competent and resourceful during the BEF's difficult period 1916–1917, laying the foundations for its full tactical success in 1918. He was advanced to Knight Commander of the Order of the Bath in January 1918, and awarded the French Croix de Guerre in December 1919.

== Civil engagement ==
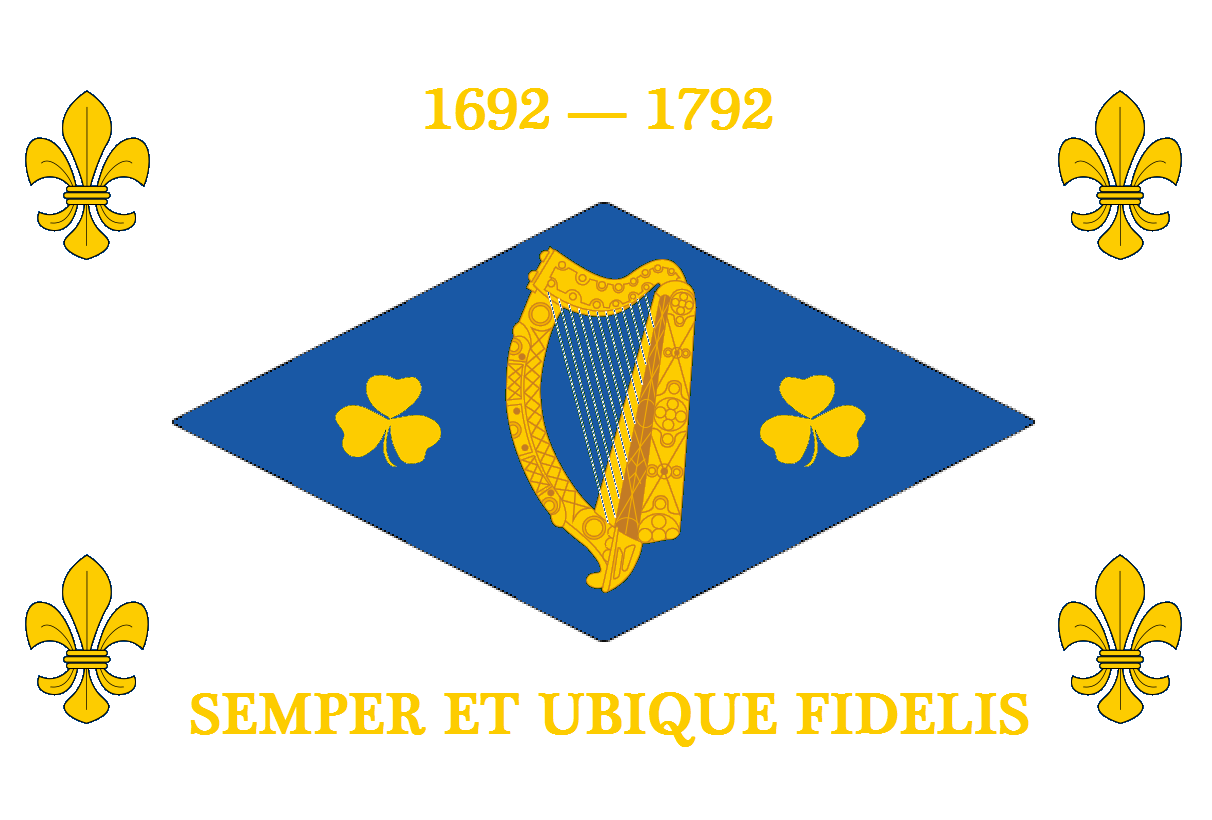
Banner presented to Major-General Sir William Hickie.

Hickie retired from the army in 1922, when the six Irish line infantry regiments that had their traditional recruiting grounds in the counties of the new Irish Free State were all disbanded. He had identified himself strongly with the Home Rule Act and said that its scrapping was a disaster, and was equally outspoken in condemning the activities of the Black and Tans. In 1925, he was elected as a member of the Irish Senate, the Seanad of the Irish Free State; across Ireland winning the fifth highest number of first-preference votes of the 76 candidates, and due to transfers was the first of the 19 to be elected.

Hickie held his seat until the Seanad was dissolved in 1936, to be replaced by Seanad Éireann in 1937. He was President of the Area Council (Southern Ireland) of the British Legion from 1925 to 1948. Hickie never married.

He died on 3 November 1950 in Dublin and was buried in Terryglass, County Tipperary.

Military offices
Preceded by Lawrence Parsons	GOC 16th (Irish) Division; 1915−1918	Succeeded by Sir Charles Hull
