= Dísert Óengusa =

Medieval hermitage in County Limerick, Ireland

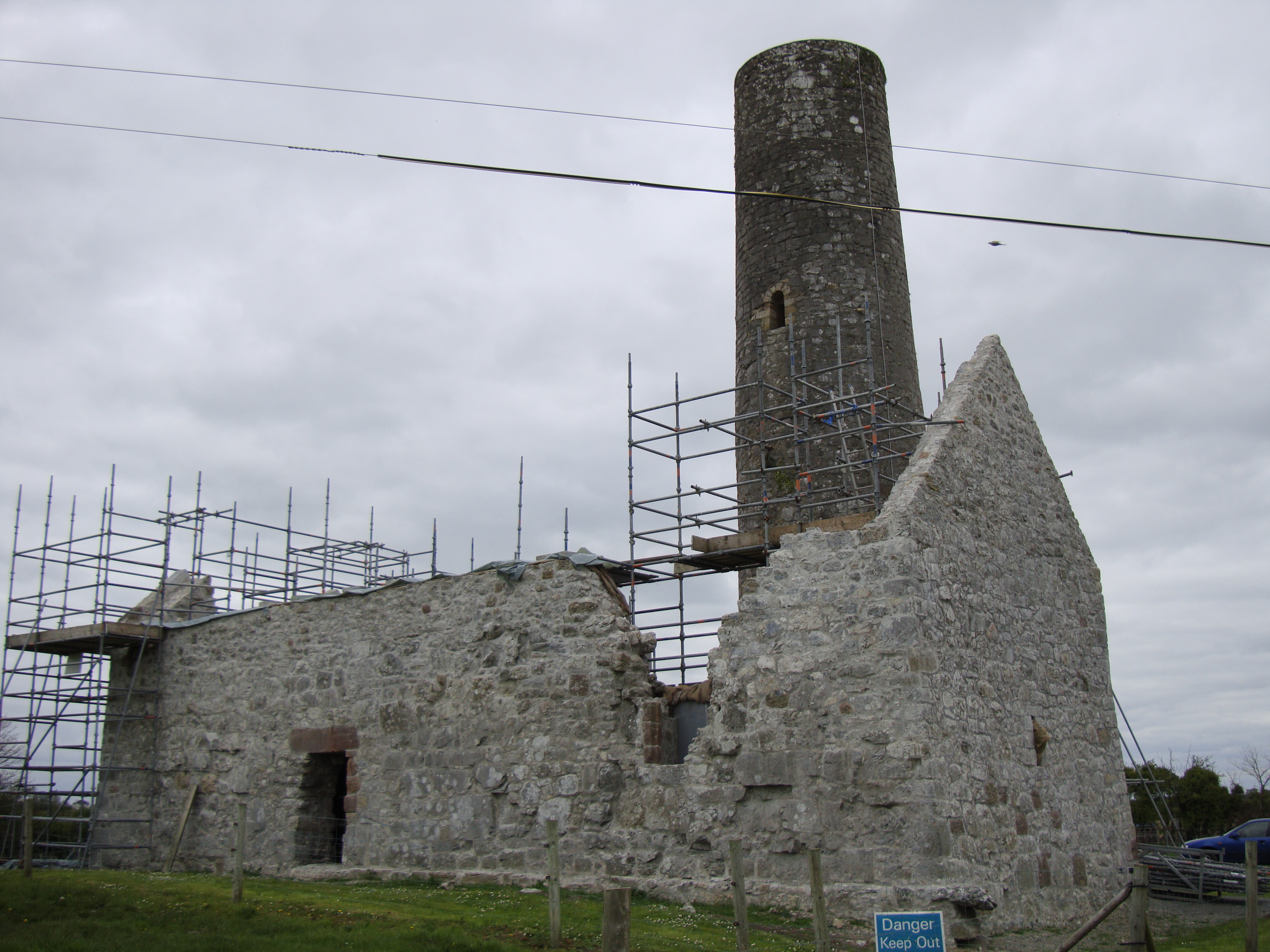

- Location within Ireland
- Interactive map of Dísert Óengusa

Monastery information
- Other names: Disert-aengusa, St Aengus's Hermitage, Dysert Aenghusa, Dysert Oenghusa, Desert Oenghus
- Order: Culdees
- Established: AD 780
- Diocese: Limerick

People
- Founder: Óengus of Tallaght

Architecture
- Status: Inactive

Site
- Location: Carrigeen, Croom, County Limerick
- Coordinates: 52.520931°N 8.744713°W
- Public access: Yes

Dísert Óengusa (Irish pronunciation: [ˈdʲiːʃəɾˠt̪ˠ ˈeːŋɡəsˠə]) is a medieval hermitage and National Monument located in County Limerick, Ireland.

== Location ==
Dísert Óengusa is located 1.8 kilometres (1.1 mi) west of Croom, near the headwaters of the River Maigue.

== History ==
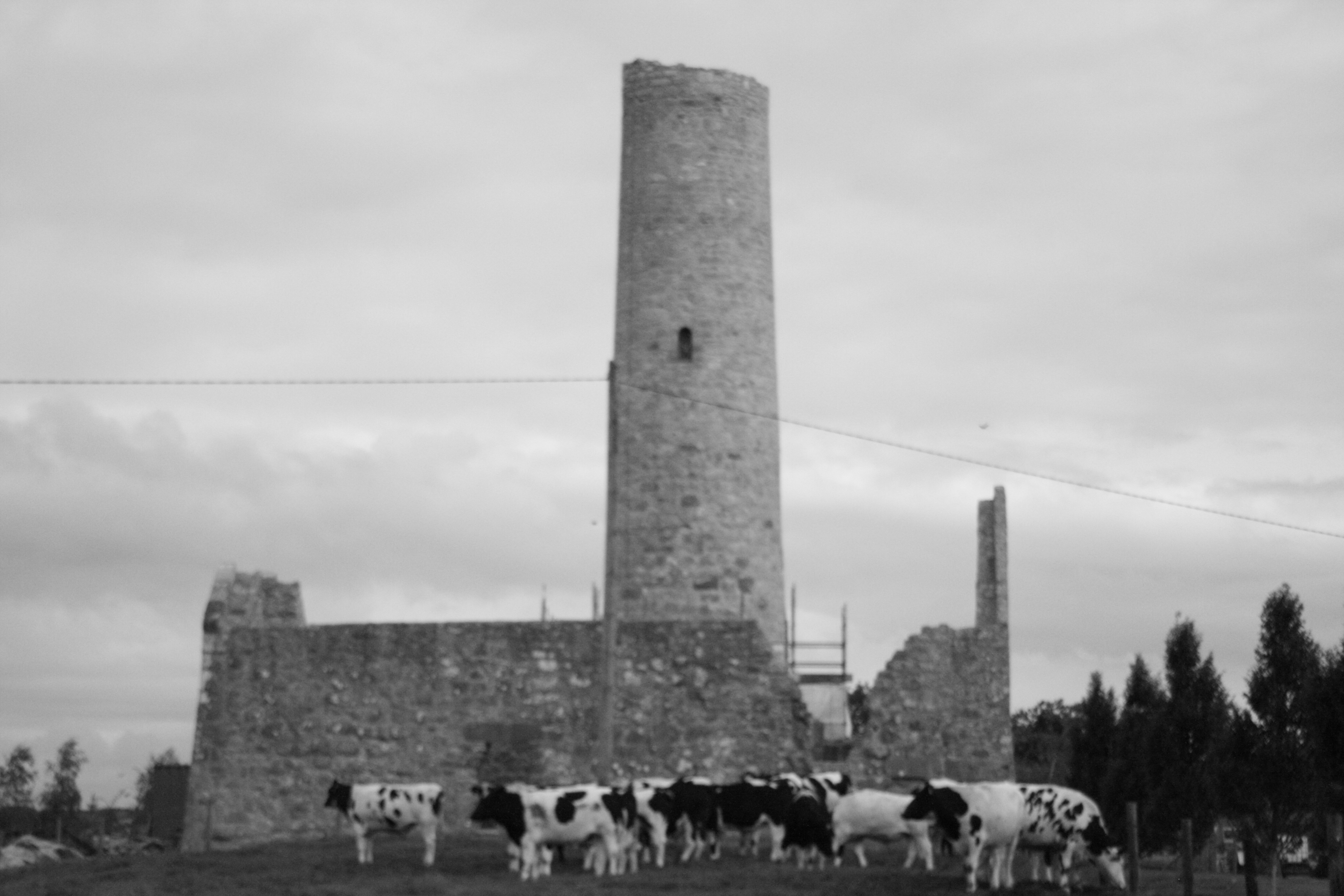
Round tower at Dísert Óengusa

Óengus of Tallaght (Óengus mac Óengobann, Óengus the Culdee, d. 824) is believed to have founded the hermitage in AD 780, leaving it two years later. It was associated with the Culdees (an ascetic movement). They founded small isolated hermitages in deserted places, sometimes called "dyserts".

The monastery is mentioned in the annals for 1033. Some early ruins on the site have been dated to the early 11th century.

The round tower was built in the 12th century. The present church, with antae, dates back to the 15th or 16th century. The church was abandoned in later centuries and fell into ruin.

Local folklore claimed the tower had been erected in a single night by a witch. It was visited and sketched by John Windele in 1833. Restoration work was carried out in 2019.

== Remains ==
The tower is 20.65 m (67.7 ft) tall with a diameter of 5.28 m (17.3 ft) and a Romanesque doorway 4.6 m (15 ft) above ground level. The church is a simple rectangle 15.5 m (51 ft) by 5 m (16 ft).
