= Slevoir =

Townland in County Tipperary, Ireland

Slevoir (Sliabh Mhaghair in Irish) is a townland in the Barony of Ormond Lower, County Tipperary, Ireland. It is located in the civil parish of Terryglass overlooking Slevoir Bay, the most north-eastern part of Lough Derg

Slevoir is the birthplace of Irish nationalist politician Sir William Hickie.

== Slevoir House ==
Slevoir House was built in 1870 for Col. J.F. Hickie. It is built of stone in two-storeys with a 5-bay frontage and stands in a 110 acres (44.5 hectares) estate close to the shores of Lough Derg. The most distinguishing feature is an Italianate tower above the entrance which is visible from the lake. The house had uPVC windows installed during its time as a religious institution but is otherwise intact. It is listed as a protected structure by Tipperary County Council (RPS Ref S363). The house has recently been restored. The Hickie family owned it until 1950, when it was sold to the Salesian Sisters. In 2000 it was bought by a Chicago businessman who never lived in it. He sold it on in 2006 to two businessmen who planned to convert it into a hotel but has recently (2013) been sold again for c.1.5m. euros.
