= Culdees =

Members of Christian communities in the Middle Ages

The Culdees (Irish: Céilí Dé, lit. 'Spouses of God'; pronounced [ceːlʲiː dʲeː]) were members of ascetic Christian monastic and eremitical communities of Ireland, Scotland, Wales and England in the Middle Ages. Appearing first in Ireland and then in Scotland, they were subsequently attached to cathedral or collegiate churches. Though they did not take monastic vows, they lived in monastic fashion.

== Etymology ==
According to the Swiss theologian Philip Schaff, the term Culdee or Ceile De, or Kaledei, first appeared in the 8th century. While "giving rise to much controversy and untenable theories", it probably means servants or worshippers of God. The term was applied to anchorites, who, in entire seclusion from society, sought the perfection of sanctity through their values of poverty, charity, self-denial and perseverance. They afterward associated themselves into communities of hermits and were finally brought under canonical rule along with the secular clergy. It was at the time the name Culdee became almost synonymous with secular canon.

== History ==
=== Ireland ===
In the course of the 9th century, nine places in Ireland are mentioned (including Armagh, Clonmacnoise, Clones, Devenish and Sligo) where communities of Culdees were established.

Óengus the Culdee lived in the last quarter of the 8th century and is best known as the author of the Félire Óengusso, "the Martyrology of Óengus". He founded Dísert Óengusa near Croom in AD 780. Maelruan, under whom Oengus lived, drew up a rule for the Culdees of Tallaght that prescribed their prayers, fasts, devotions, confession, and penances, but there is no evidence that this rule was widely accepted even in the other Culdean establishments. Fedelmid mac Crimthainn king of Munster (820–846) was said to have been a prominent Culdee. The eighth century Irish poet Blathmac has been speculated to have been part of the Culdee movement.

According to William Reeves, they were analogous to secular canons and held an intermediate position between the monastic and parochial clergy. In Armagh, they were presided over by a Prior and numbered about twelve. They were the officiating clergy of the churches and became the standing ministers of the cathedral. The maintenance of divine service, and in particular, the practice of choral worship, seems to have been their special function and made them an important element of the cathedral economy.

However, after the death of Maelruan in 792, Tallaght is forgotten, and the name Ceile-De disappears from the Irish annals until 919, when the Four Masters record that Armagh was plundered by the Danes but that the houses of prayer, "with the people of God, that is Ceile-De", were spared. Subsequent entries in the annals show that there were Culdees at Clondalkin, at Monahincha in Tipperary, and at Scattery Island.

The Danish wars affected the Culdee houses. Clondalkin and Clones disappeared altogether. At Clonmacnoise, as early as the eleventh century, the Culdees were laymen and married, while those at Monahincha and Scattery Island, being utterly corrupt and unable, or unwilling, to reform, gave way to the regular canons. At Armagh, regular canons were introduced into the cathedral church in the twelfth century and took precedence over the Culdees, six in number, a prior and five vicars. These still continued a corporate existence, charged with the celebration of the Divine offices and the care of the church building: they had separate lands and sometimes charge of parishes. When a chapter was formed, about 1160, the prior usually filled the office of precentor, his brethren being vicars choral, and himself ranking in the chapter next to the chancellor. He was elected by his brother Culdees and confirmed by the primate, and had a voice in the election of the archbishop by virtue of his position in the chapter.

As Ulster was the last of the Irish provinces to be brought effectually under English rule the Armagh Culdees long outlived their brethren throughout Ireland. The Culdees of Armagh endured until the dissolution in 1541 and enjoyed a fleeting resurrection in 1627, soon after which their ancient property passed to the vicars choral of the cathedral.

=== Scotland ===
In Scotland, Culdees were more numerous than in Ireland: thirteen monastic establishments were peopled by them, eight in connection with cathedrals. The Ionan monks had been expelled by the Pictish king Nechtan son of Derile in 717. There is no mention of any Culdees at any Columban monastery, either in Ireland or in Scotland, until long after Columba's time: in 1164 that Culdees are mentioned as being in Iona but in a subordinate position. The Culdee of Loch Leven lived on St Serf's Inch, which had been given them by a Pictish prince, Brude, about 700. In 1093, they surrendered their island to the bishop of St Andrews in return for perpetual food and clothing but Robert, the bishop in 1144, handed over all their vestments, books, and other property, with the island, to the newly founded Canons Regular, in which the Culdees were likely incorporated.

The Culdee chapel in St Andrews in Fife can be seen to the north-east of its ruined cathedral and city wall. It is dedicated to "St Mary on the Rock" and is cruciform. It is used by the local St Andrews churches for their Easter morning service. In the early days there were several Culdee establishments in Fife, probably small rude structures accommodating 30 or 40 worshippers, and possibly such a structure stood at or near the present church. In 1075 AD, the foundation charter of Dunfermline Church was granted by King Malcolm III, and amongst the possessions, he bestowed on the church was the Shire of Kirkcaladinit, as Kirkcaldy was then known. Crínán of Dunkeld, the grandfather of Máel Coluim III, was a lay abbot, and tradition says that even the clerical members were married, though unlike the priests of the Eastern Orthodox Church, they lived apart from their wives during their term of sacerdotal service.

The pictures that we have of Culdee life in the 12th century vary considerably. The chief houses in Scotland were at St Andrews, Scone, Dunkeld, Lochleven, Monymusk in Aberdeenshire, Abernethy and Brechin. Each was an independent establishment controlled entirely by its own abbot and apparently divided into two sections, one priestly and the other lay. Culdee priests were allowed to marry. At St Andrews about the year 1100, there were thirteen Culdees holding office by hereditary tenure, some apparently paying more regard to their own prosperity than to the services of the church or the needs of the populace. At Loch Leven, there is no trace of such partial independence.

Nineteenth Century Scottish historian of religion and Presbyterian minister James Aitken Wylie asserted in his History of the Scottish Nation, Vol. III., "The 12th century, particularly in Scotland and Brittany, was a time when two Christian faiths of different origins were contending for possession of the land, the Roman Church and the old Celtic Rite. The age was a sort of borderland between Culdeeism and Romanism. The two met and mingled often in the same monastery, and the religious belief of the nation was a mumble of superstitious doctrines and a few scriptural truths".

A controversial movement to put Scotland's church under the authority of Rome was inaugurated by Malcolm III's wife, Queen Margaret and carried through by her sons Alexander I and David I. Gradually the whole position passed into the hands of Thurgot and his successors in the bishopric. Canons Regular were instituted and some of the Culdees joined the Roman Catholic church. Those who declined were allowed a life-rent of their revenues and lingered on as a separate but ever-dwindling body till the beginning of the 14th century when excluded from voting at the election of the bishop, they disappear from history. In the same fashion the Culdee of Monymusk, originally perhaps a colony from St Andrews, became Canons Regular of the Augustinian order early in the 13th century, and those of Abernethy in 1273. At Brechin, famous like Abernethy for its round tower, the Culdee prior and his monks helped to form the chapter of the diocese founded by David I in 1145, though the name persisted for a generation or two.

By the end of the thirteenth century, most Scots Culdee houses had disappeared. Some, like Dunkeld and Abernethy, were superseded by regular canons: others, like Brechin and Dunblane, were extinguished with the introduction of cathedral chapters. One at least, Monifieth, passed into the hands of laymen. At St Andrews, they lived on side by side with the regular canons and still clung to their ancient privilege of electing the archbishop. But their claim was disallowed at Rome, and in 1273 they were debarred even from voting. They continued to be mentioned up until 1332 in the records of St Andrews, where they "formed a small college of highly-placed secular clerks closely connected with the bishop and the king".

Some of the first Norse settlers on Orkney, Faroe's and Iceland were said to be Norse–Gaels, referred to as Vestmenn. When Scandinavians first set foot on these islands they found a community of Culdee monks, referred to as papar. Numerous place names in Orkney are named of these same eremitic Gaelic monks such as Pabbay,"Island of the papar (Culdee)" or Pabay.

=== Wales ===
Although the name ‘Culdee’ is rarely used to refer to the Celtic Saints in Wales and Cornwall, many of them began as hermits, passed on pre-Christian druidic beliefs and traditions into the new Christian age. They originally lived as anchorites and anchoresses, established isolated retreats in the wilderness such as bogs, forests, and small offshore isles, generally in locations and places that held a significance going back to Druidic times, later these sites became major Celtic Christian monasteries. The most famous of the “insular” hubs of monastic life were on Anglesey and Bardsey. The Celtic Christian Church in Wales remained independent of the Holy See up to the late Middle Ages, it resisted any Gregorian reforms that Canterbury and Saint Augustine tried in impose on the early Welsh Church.

Gerald of Wales mentioned a Culdean house in Snowdon in Speculum Ecclesiae which was oppressed by the Cistercians who wanted the property as well as mentioning a community of "very religious monks" at Bardsey Island in north Wales in Itinerarium Cambriae.

=== England ===
Similar absorptions no doubt account for the disappearance of the Culdees of York, the only English establishment that uses the name, borne by the canons of St Peter's about 925 where they performed in the tenth century the double duty of officiating in the cathedral church and of relieving the sick and poor. When a new cathedral arose under a Norman archbishop, they ceased their connection with the cathedral, but, helped by donations, continued to relieve the destitute. The date at which they finally disappeared is unknown. These seem to be the only cases where the term "Culdee" is found in England.

== Origin ==
Hector Boece in his Latin history of Scotland (1516), makes the Culdees of the 9th to the 12th century the direct successors of the Irish and Ionan monasticism of the 6th to the 8th century. Some have suggested that these views were disproved by William Reeves (1815–1892), bishop of Down, Connor and Dromore. James A. Wylie (1808–1890) makes a strong case that the Culdees (Keledei) of Scotland are related to the Celtic Christian Pelagian spirituality of the monks of Iona.

Reeves suggests that Maelruan may have been aware of the establishment of canons in Metz by Archbishop Chrodegang, (died 766), as an intermediate class between monks and secular priests, adopting the discipline of the monastic system, without the vows, and discharging the offices of ministers in various churches.

== Protestant claims ==
The term Culdee has been improperly applied to the whole Celtic church, and a superior purity has been claimed for it. It has also been asserted, that the Kelts or Culdees were the forerunners of Protestantism. Protestant writers alleged that the Culdees had preserved Celtic Christianity, free from supposed Roman corruptions, in one remote corner of western Europe. This view was enshrined in Thomas Campbell's Reullura:

Peace to their shades. The pure Culdees
Were Albyn's earliest priests of God,
Ere yet an island of her seas
By foot of Saxon monk was trod.

However, Schaff maintains, "...this inference is not warranted. Ignorance is one thing, and rejection of an error from superior knowledge is quite another thing. ...There is not the least evidence that the Keltic church had a higher conception of Christian freedom, or of any positive distinctive principle of Protestantism..."

The French Protestant author François Bonifas claimed that there a Culdean Church was founded in the 2nd century and restored by Saint Patrick in Ireland in the 5th century.

== "Culdee" in fiction ==
- In The Railway Series by Rev. W. Awdry there is a rack railway called the Culdee Fell Railway. One of the steam locomotives is named Culdee. In the Island of Sodor's fictional Gaelic language of Sudric, 'Culdee' is said to translate as 'Companion of God', the mountain being named for the island's Patron Saint, Machan. The Rev. Awdry often used names from religion and the Anglican Church as placenames in his books. The island of Sodor where the series takes place, for example, is named after a Church of England Diocese, the Diocese of Sodor and Man.
- Geoffrey Moorhouse's 'Sun Dancing', the fictional sections feature an account of a particular ascetic Culdee
- Stephen Lawhead's novels Byzantium, Patrick, and the Celtic Crusades trilogy focus on the Cele De.
- J.P. Moore's short story "Useful Visions" is set in a Culdee monastery.
- A colony of Culdees in Iceland appears in H. Warner Munn's fantasy novel, Merlin's Ring.
- Culdees are a prominent part of the story of the "Tile Cutters' Penny" by Caiseal Mor
- In Proinsias Mac a' Bhaird's Tairngreacht, a modern sect of Céile Dé or 'Culdees' engage in a conspiracy against the Vatican.

== See also ==
- Christianity in Medieval Scotland
- Leabhar Breac

== Bibliography ==
- W. Beveridge, Makers of the Scottish Church (1908).
- B. Olsen, Sacred Places North America, CCC Publishing, Santa Cruz, California (2003)
- W. Reeves, The Culdees of the British Islands (Dublin, 1864)
- W. F. Skene, Celtic Scotland (1876–1880), especially vol. ii.
- J. A. Wylie "History of the Scottish Nation" (London: Hamilton/Adams, Edinburgh: A Elliot, 1886–1890) vol. ii and especially vol. iii, chapters 17 and 21
- For a more archaic viewpoint, see J. Jamieson, Historical Account of the Ancient Culdees (1811).
