= Fintan of Clonenagh =

Irish monk and saint (c. 526 – 603)

Saint Fintan of Clonenagh
- Born: c. 526
- Canonized: pre-congregation
- Feast: 17 February

Fintan of Clonenagh (c. 526 – 603) was an Irish hermit and monk. He was an abbot and disciple of Columba of Terryglass.

== Life ==
Fintan was born in about 526, the son of Christians Gabhren and Findlath.

The monastery at Clonenagh was founded in the 6th century by Fintan of Clonenagh who entrusted it to his disciple Columba when Colum moved on to Terryglass around 548. Fintan received his religious formation under the Abbot Colum, and was deeply influenced by his penitential practices and the severity of his Rule. Under his direction Fintan developed a reputation for austerity.

Fintan gave his monks very strict rules not to consume any animal products. The community did not have even one cow and so they had neither milk nor butter. The monks complained they couldn’t do hard work on so meagre a diet. A deputation of local clergy headed by Canice of Aghaboe came to urge him to improve it. He agreed for his monks, but he elected to keep to the strict diet himself. Fintan was reported to have lived on only "bread of woody barley and clayey water of clay".

His disciples included Colmán of Oughaval, and Comgall of Bangor. He has been compared by the Irish annalists to St. Benedict, and is styled "Father of the Irish Monks".

Fintan of Clonenagh is regarded as one of three patron saints of county Laois which include Colman Mac ua Laoise and Mochua of Timahoe. He died in 603. His feast day is 17 February.

Though he is sometimes confused with Fintán or Munnu, abbot of Taghmon, they are distinct.

== St. Fintan's Tree, Clonenagh ==
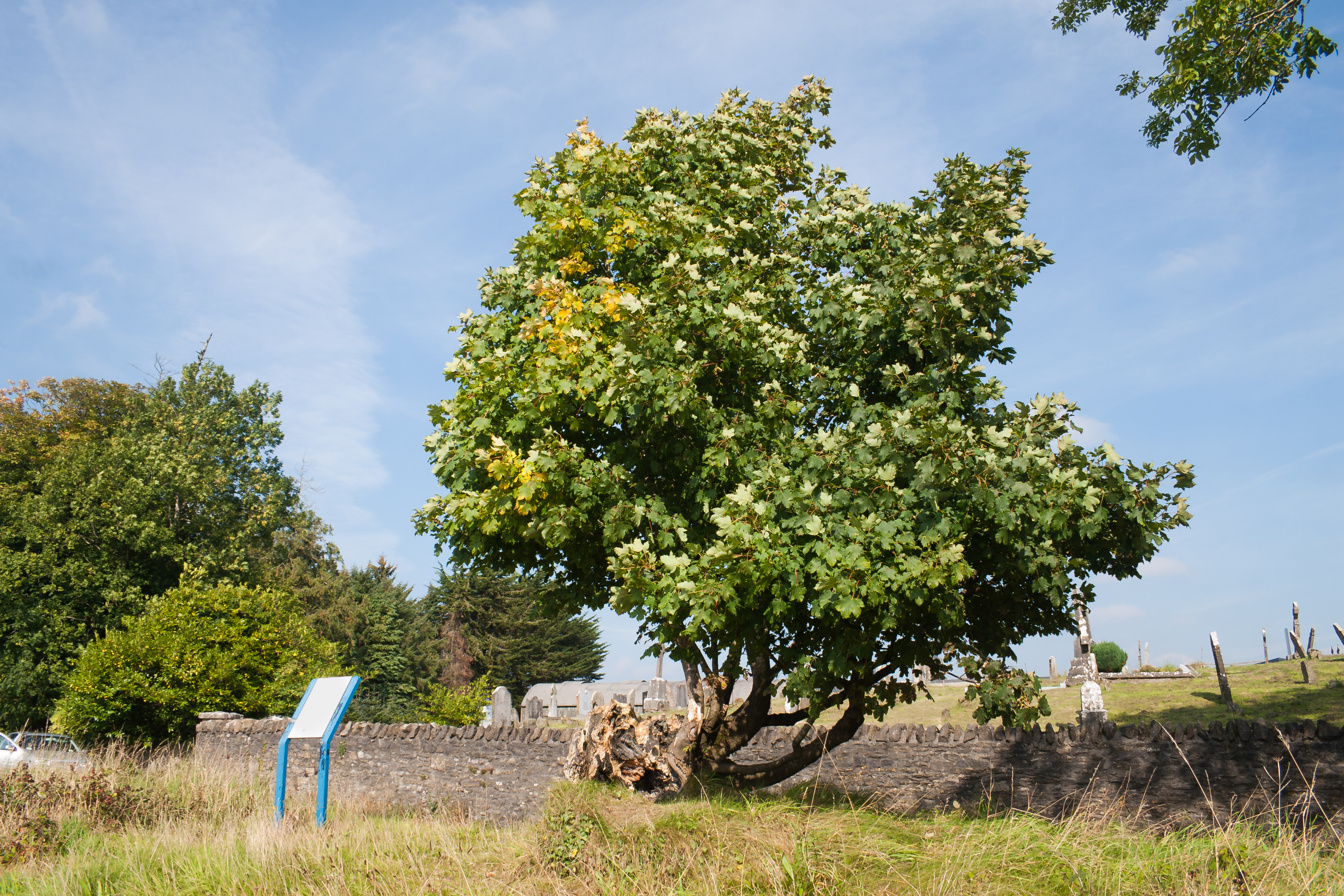
St. Fintan's Tree, Clonenagh

This tree, an Acer pseudoplatanus, was planted in the late 18th or early 19th century at the site of the Early Christian monastic site of Clonenagh. The tree is dedicated to Saint Fintan and it became custom to insert coins into the tree from which the tree suffered and was believed to be dead until the tree started to recover with some new shoots. It was blown down in a storm in 1994.
