= Columba of Terryglass =

One of the Twelve Apostles of Ireland

Saint Columba of Terryglass
- Died: 13 December 552
- Venerated in: Eastern Orthodox Church, Roman Catholicism
- Feast: 12 December

Columba of Terryglass (Colum) (died 13 December 552) was the son of Ninnidh, a descendant of Crinthainn, King of Leinster. Columba was a disciple of St. Finnian of Clonard. He was one of the Twelve Apostles of Ireland.

== Life ==
In his youth, he learned his psalms and hymns from an old holy man named Colman Cule, who lived near Clonenagh, and founded the church of Cluain Cain. Afterwards, he studied with Finnian of Clonard. Columba resolved to go to Rome and bring back some relics of Saints Peter and Paul. On his return, he visited Tours and brought from there the staff of St. Martin of Tours. He also visited England and preached with some success to the Anglo-Saxons. Returning home, he remained a year at Clonenagh before crossing Slieve Bloom and founding a church near Lough Derg.

John Healy reports that around 520 Columba was prompted by an angel to relocate to Inis Cealtra, where he remained a long time. According to one story, when one of his monks died suddenly on the shore opposite the northern part of the island, Columba ordered the monks to go and say to the dead man, "Columba bids thee arise." The man then arose and returned with them to the island. Columba founded the celebrated monastery of Tirdaglas (Tir-da-glasí), or Terryglass in 548. Fintan of Clonenagh received his religious formation at Terryglass and was deeply influenced by the penitential practices and the severity of the Rule.

When Finnian was in extremis, suffering from the plague, he sent for Columba to administer Holy Viaticum. Columba himself died of the plague on 13 December 552, and was buried within the precincts of his monastery at Terryglass. A holy well, named after Columba, is located in the village of Terryglass and is alleged to cure headaches and migraines.

Some fifteen other saints of Ireland, bearing the name Columba, are mentioned in the Martyrology of Gorman. While Columba is traditionally considered a saint, he is not listed in the latest official, complete martyrology of the Catholic Church, the 2004 Martyrologium Romanum in Latin.
