= Oughaval, County Laois =

Townland in County Laois, Ireland

Coordinates: 53.005°N 7.125°W

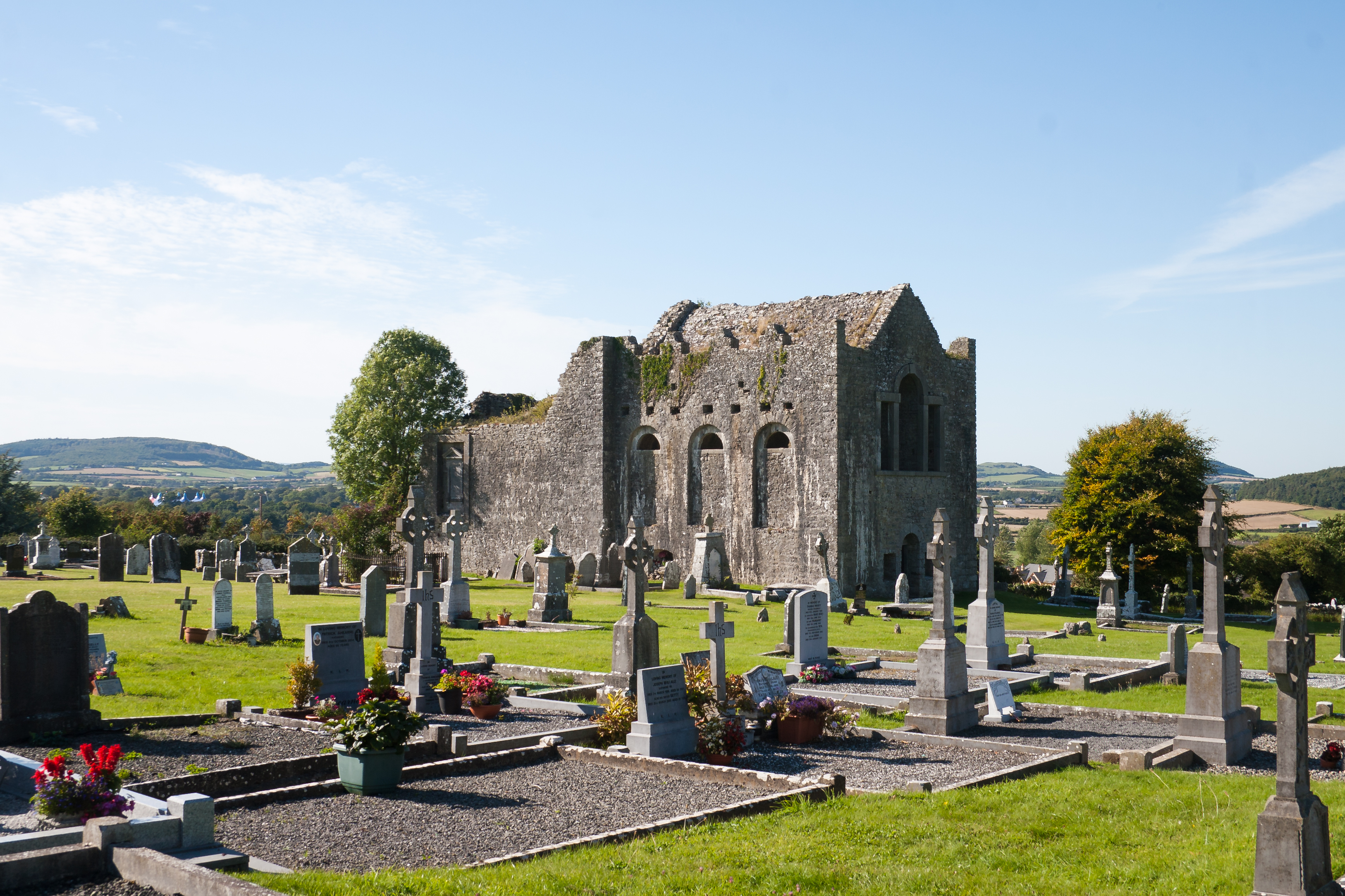
Oughaval Monastery and graveyard

Oughaval (An Nuachabháil), sometimes called Oakvale, is a townland in the civil parish of Stradbally, County Laois, in Ireland. It is the site of a sixth-century monastic settlement.

== Monastery ==
A monastery was founded at Oughaval in the late sixth century by St Colman mac Ua Laoighse, otherwise St Colman of Oughaval. He was a disciple of St Columba of Iona and of St Fintan, abbot of Clonenagh, and in the Martyrology of Tallaght he appears as Colman mac h Laighsi, with a feast day on 15 May. After several years as a novice at Iona, Colman returned to Ireland and chose Oughaval as the site of a new monastic settlement. Exactly when this was founded is unknown, but it was a little before the repose of St Fintan in about 595. The foundation had ceased to function long before the Dissolution of the Monasteries under Henry VIII.

The Book of Leinster was kept at Oughaval for many generations and was then known as Lebor na Nuachongbála, or the Book of Oughaval.

In the early 18th century a 12th-century stone roofed church survived, and the Cosbys of Stradbally Hall added a mortuary-chancel to it. The site of the monastery can still be identified, and a burial ground there is still in use. However, there are now no remains of the original church or monastic building, as the stone from them was robbed in the 18th century to build a mausoleum.

In about 1994, the Russian Orthodox Church built a new church nearby, in the demesne of Stradbally Hall, dedicated to St Colman of Oughaval.

== Oughaval Wood ==
Oughaval Wood, about 1.5 kilometres out of Stradbally on the Carlow road, is a mixed woodland of one hundred and fifty hectares of broadleaved trees, with more than twenty kilometres of paths to walk. About half of the trees are beech planted in 1938-1941, and other species include ash, oak and Scots pine. There is a car park and a picnic site. The wood's flora includes bluebells and primroses, and its fauna badgers, foxes, rabbits, squirrels, and all kinds of native birds, including game.

Deep in the wood is the Mass Rock, where in the penal years between 1691 and 1727 local people gathered for Mass, and there is also a folly in the wood called Cobbler's Castle.

== Township history ==
Griffith's valuation, which was completed in 1864, shows twenty-two tenements in Oughaval, one of them in the occupation of the Rev. Cornelius Dowlin. The other names which appear in the valuation for the township were Byrne, Cosby, Dowling, Empey, Finch, Greene, Hodgens, Keeffe, Large, Manser, Murray, Power, Shortall, Smyth, Tarleton, Walsh, and Whelan.

== Druim an Tochair ==
Hogan's Onomasticon Goedelicum states: Druim Toga, alias Druim Togaidhe, Senach and Colmán of Tulach mac nDomnaill and of D. T., Lec. 106, Ll. 349, Bb. 121 a, Fir. 731; ¶ now Navan, C. 354; ¶ in Laigis Laigen, Lec. 274, Md. 128, 212, Lec. 216, Lb. 17; ¶ in Hui Condmaill, Bb. 121 b; ¶ Colman and Senach in Tilaig mic Comgaill, and in D. Thogae, i.e., isinduachongbail, Ll. 350; ¶ it is in Leix, al. Queen's c., and is al. Nuachongbail, miswritten nDuachongabail, now Nohaval or Ohaval cemetery, which I have seen on a ridge nr Stradbally, Queen's county. Modern scholars translate this as Druim an Tochair meaning "The Hill-Ridge of the Causeway", but the earliest sources such as the genealogies of the saints and the Martyrology of Donegal treat it as a personal name, i.e. Druim Toga, meaning 'The Hill-Ridge of Toga'. Toga may refer to the mythological figure mentioned in the Middle Irish text c.1400 from The Yellow Book of Lecan entitled The Settling of the Manor of Tara, in which verse 34 states- daughter of Toga of the grey stormy sea, at that time ’twas a woman, she from whom Sliabh Raisen is named.

== See also ==
- List of abbeys and priories in Ireland (County Laois)
