= Dunamase =

Rocky outcrop in County Laois, Ireland

Coordinates: 53°1′54″N 7°12′37″W

- Dún Másc
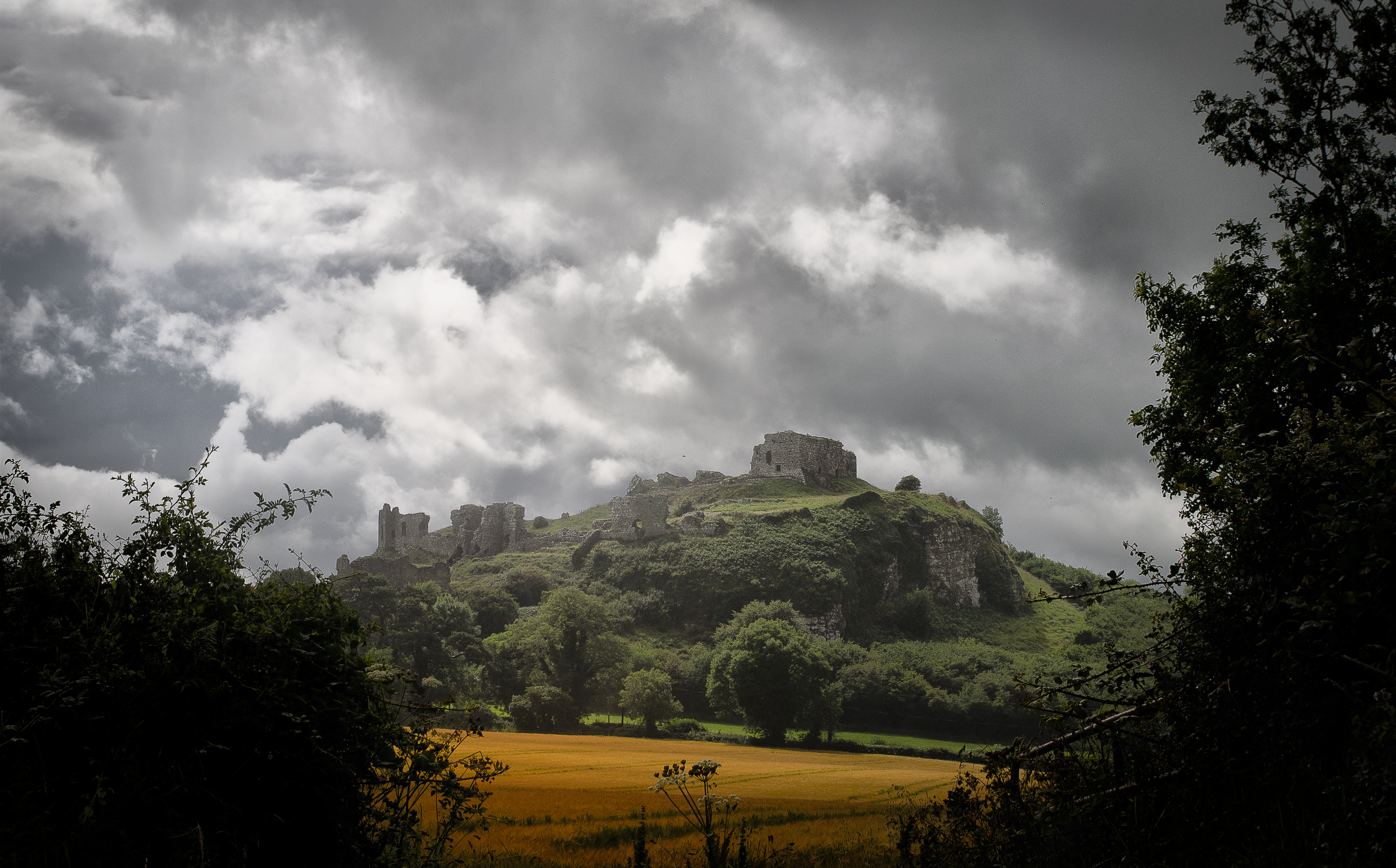
- Interactive map of Dunamase
- Location: County Laois, Ireland

History
- Built: c. 9th century

National monument of Ireland
- Official name: Dunamase Castle
- Reference no.: 615

Dunamase or the Rock of Dunamase (Irish: Dún Másc "fort of Másc") is a rocky outcrop in County Laois, Ireland. Rising 46 metres (151 ft) above a plain, it has the ruins of Dunamase Castle, a defensive stronghold dating from the early Hiberno-Norman period with a view across to the Slieve Bloom Mountains. It is near the N80 road between the towns of Portlaoise and Stradbally.

== History ==
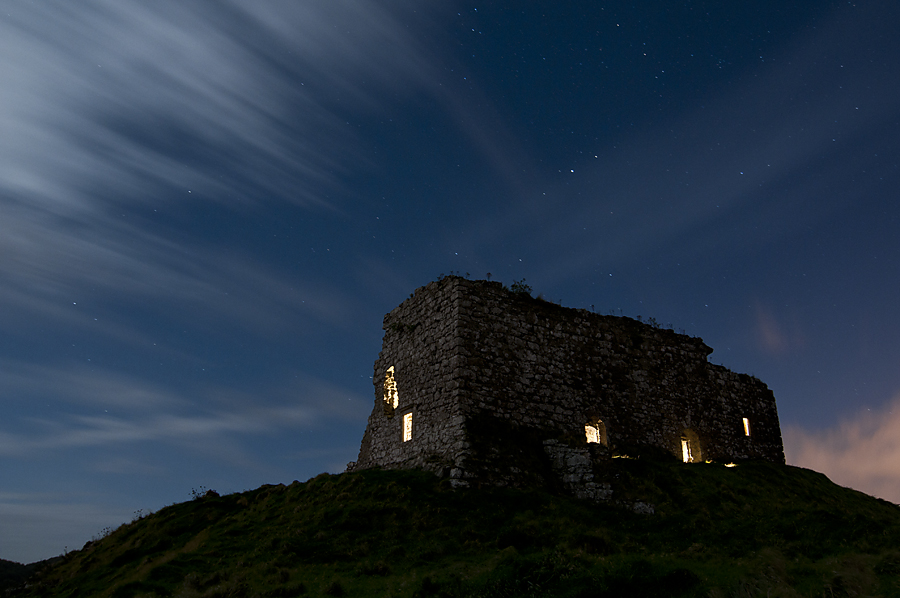
Dunamase Castle at night

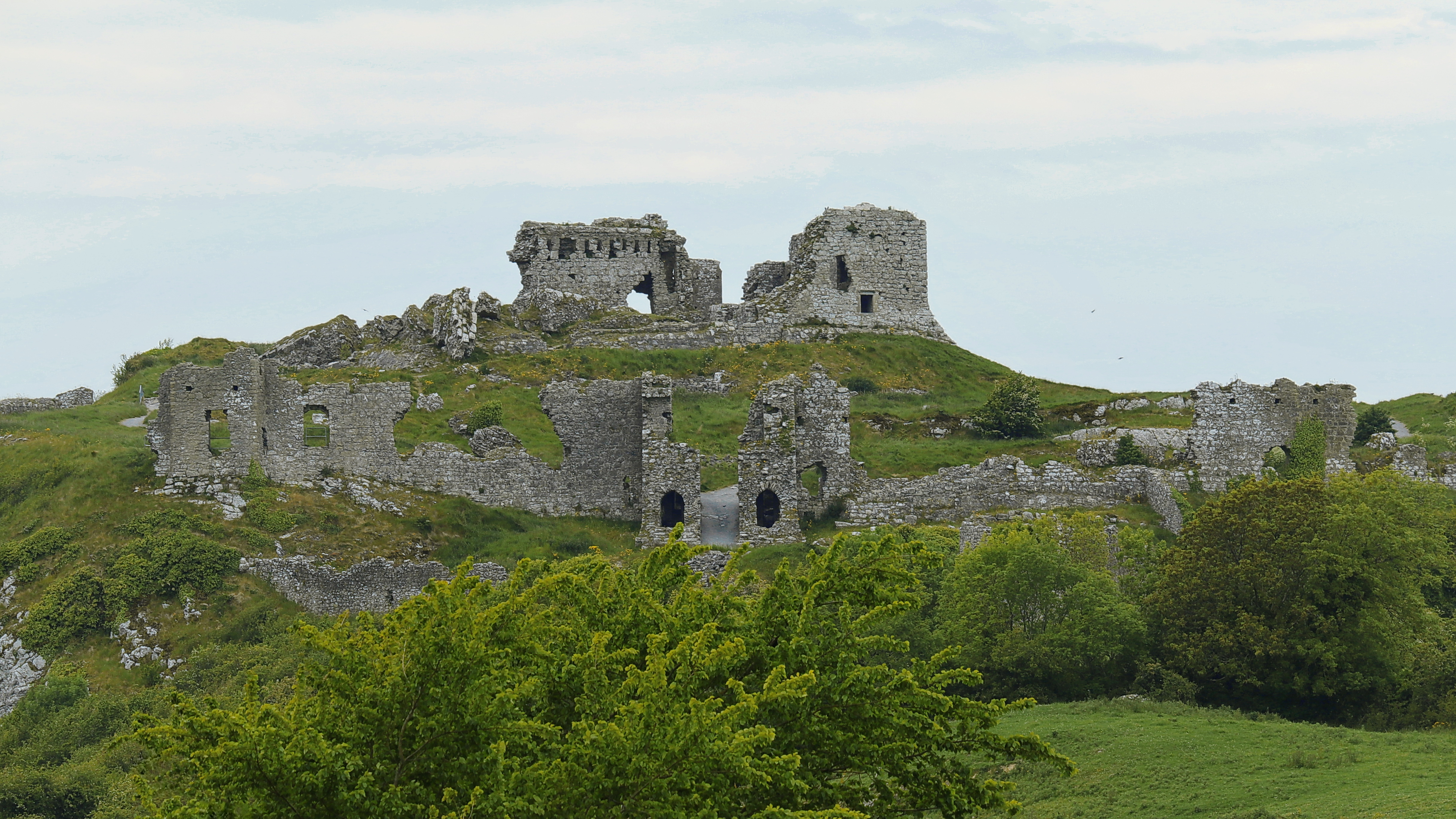
The castle ruins

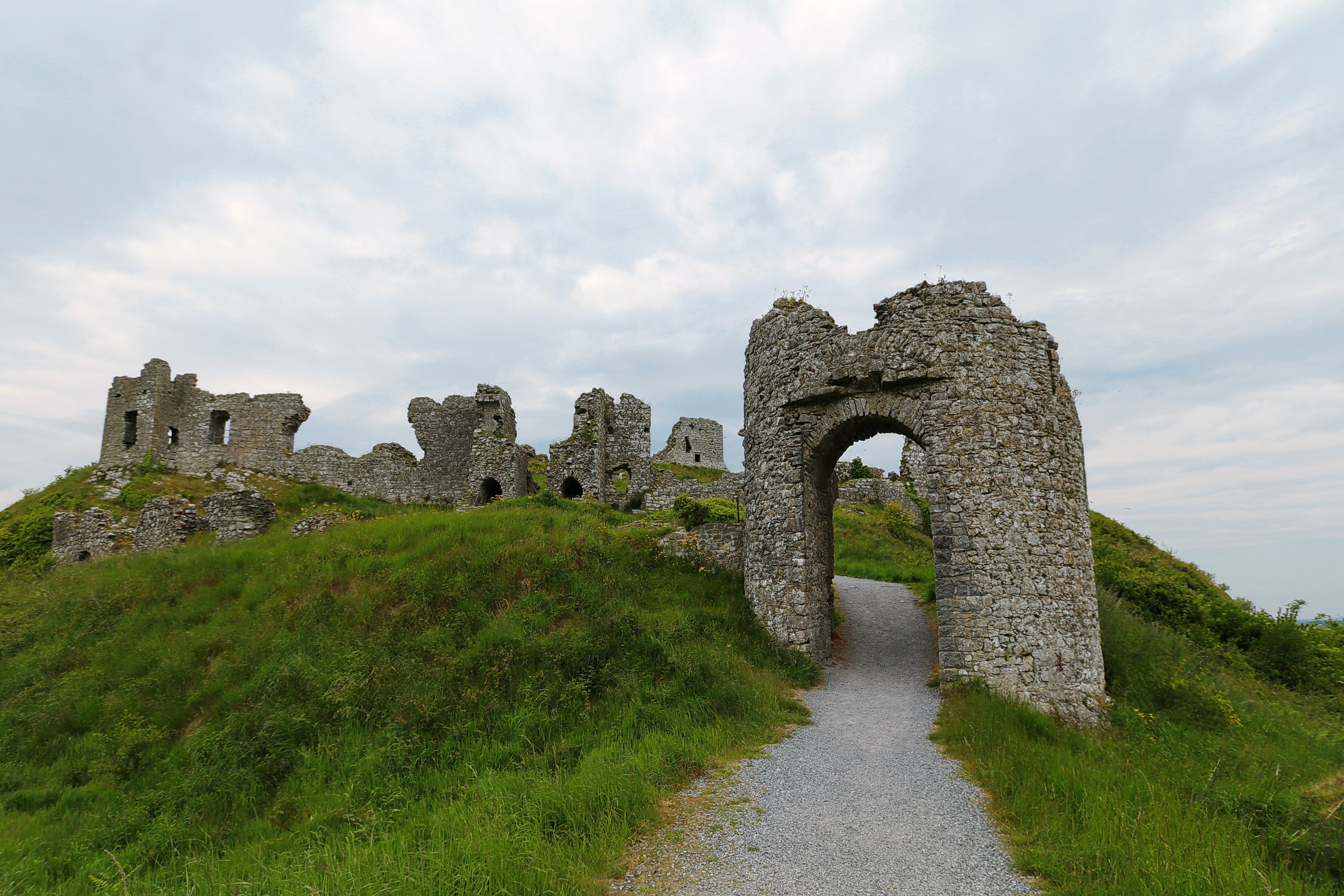
Closeup of the castle ruins

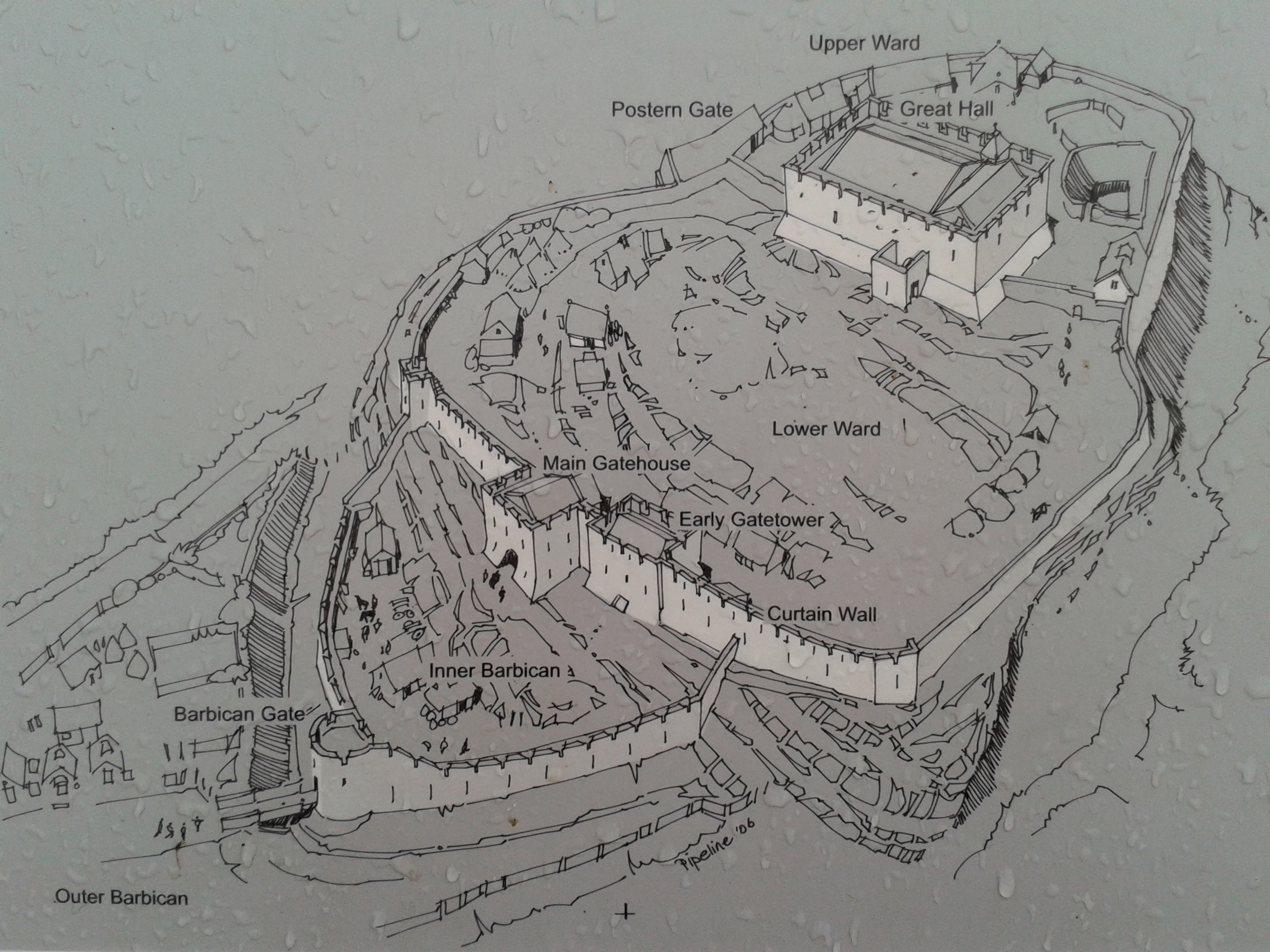
Plan of how the castle originally looked

Dunamase was one of the landmarks shown on Ptolemy's map in the year 140. Excavations in the 1990s demonstrated that the Rock was first settled in the 9th century when a hill fort or dún was constructed on the site. In 845 the Vikings of Dublin attacked the site and the abbot of Terryglass, Aed son of Dub dá Chrích, was killed there. There is no clear evidence of 10th–11th century occupation.

The castle was built in the second half of the 12th century.

When the Normans arrived in Ireland in the late 12th century, Dunamase became the most important Hiberno-Norman fortification in Laois. It was Dunamase where Dermot Mac Morrough, King of Leinster, brought the wife of O'Rourke, the King of Breifne, after kidnapping her. Enlisting the help of the O'Connor clan, the O'Rourkes and O'Connors drove MacMurrough from Dunamase and he fled Ireland. MacMurrough gave Dunamase and his daughter Aoife in marriage to the Norman conqueror Strongbow in 1170 as part of a deal to enlist his help to regain his lands. The Norman invasion of Ireland then followed when Strongbow accompanied MacMurrough, along with many men, to attack and regain MacMurrogh's lands.

Later, with the marriage of Strongbow and Aoife's daughter and heir, Isabel, the castle passed into the hands of the Marshal family. William Marshal, who later became Regent of England in the minority of Henry III, had five sons, all of whom succeeded him in turn and died without issue. So in 1247 the Marshal lands were divided among William's five daughters. Dunamase fell to Eva Marshal and then to her daughter, Maud, who was married to Roger Mortimer. The castle remained in Mortimer hands until 1330 when another Roger Mortimer was executed for treason. By the time the Mortimer family was rehabilitated the castle seems to have passed out of the area under Norman control. It seems to have become a ruinous shell by 1350.

From the 1400s and until the 16th century it was part of the land of the powerful O'More (now Moore or Ó Mórdha) family who ruled the county of County Laois for several hundreds of years until the 16th century when they faced great opposition from the English (see Plantations of Ireland). Rory O'More famously resisted the English. Hence, County Laois today is still nicknamed "The O'Moore County". The O'More's move from Laois to new lands is so memorialised in a 19th-century poem, Transplanted, by William O'Neill:

But vain I wait and listen for Rory Og is dead,
And in the halls of Dunamase a Saxon rules instead,
And o'er his fruitful acres the stranger now is lord
Where since the days of Cuchorb a proud O'Moore kept ward.

The castle was notably owned by, Rory O'More, Lord of Laois. The O'Mores left the castle and moved to Kildare, on land granted to them in 1574 by Rory O'More's cousin, Elizabeth I of England. The O'More family became the Moore family, although in 1751 an O'More married into the O'Ferrall family, who subsequently took on the surname More O'Ferrall. The family had been reduced from one of the most powerful Irish families to standard aristocrats, although the More O'Ferralls declined a peerage in the 17th century and later a baronetcy in the 19th (they still have the right to use their Irish title, Lord of Laois, and the head of the family is sometimes addressed as so). However, despite the change in status, the family has still played an important role in Irish history since their move. Their former castle played no part in the Cromwellian wars. It was slighted in 1650 to prevent it being used. In the later 18th century Sir John Parnell started to build a banqueting hall within the ruins and this work incorporated medieval architectural details taken from other sites in the area.
