= Terryglass =

Village in County Tipperary, Ireland

Terryglass Tír Dhá Ghlas
- Village
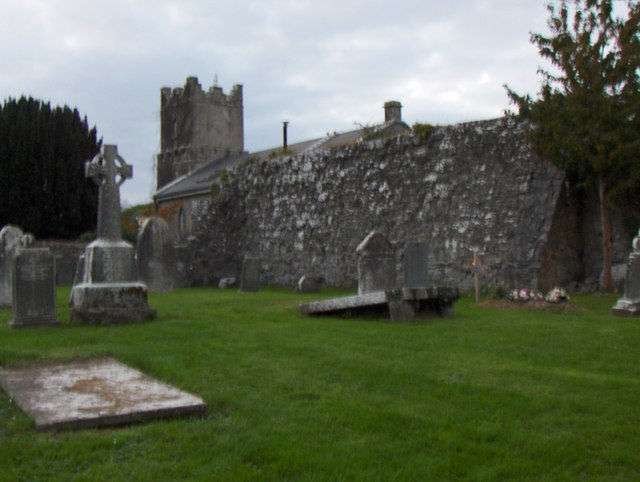

- Location in Ireland
- Coordinates: 53°03′19″N 8°12′16″W
- Country: Ireland
- Province: Munster
- County: County Tipperary
- Time zone: UTC+0 (WET)
  - Summer (DST): UTC-1 (IST (WEST))

Terryglass (Irish: Tír Dhá Ghlas, meaning 'land of the two streams') is a village in County Tipperary, Ireland. It is on the north-eastern shore of Lough Derg, near where the River Shannon enters the lough, on the R493 road. Terryglass is also a civil parish in the historical barony of Ormond Lower, and an ecclesiastical parish in the Roman Catholic Diocese of Killaloe.

== History ==
In the early Middle Ages, the place was known as Tír dá glass (also Tirdaglas and Tirraglasse). A monastery (abbey) was founded there by Columba of Terryglass (d. 13 December 552) in 549. He was the son of Colum mac Crimthainn and a disciple of St. Finnian of Clonard. He was one of the Twelve Apostles of Ireland. The monastery became a centre of learning and produced (about 1160) the Book of Leinster, which is now housed in Trinity College Dublin. The Book is an important collection of history, tales and poems written in Middle Irish and is believed to be the work of Áed Ua Crimthainn, a 12th-century abbot of Terryglass.

The Vikings frequently raided the abbey. In 843 an expedition led by Turgesius raided Terryglass and neighbouring Lorrha and in 1164 the abbey was burnt. A remaining wall from this abbey can be seen at the back of Old Church in the village.

Terryglass won the Irish Tidy Towns Competition in 1983 and 1997.

== Wells ==
Terryglass has two holy wells: St. Augh's Eye Well and St. Columba's Headache Well. St. Augh's Eye Well is located on the quay and is dedicated to the 9th century Christian saint named Augh. Local legend holds that Augh lost his eyes to a Danish chieftain who lived in Slevoir. Augh is reputed to have regained his sight thanks to water from the eye well. Believers visit the well on Saturdays during the month of May between sunrise and sunset in search of cures for eye problems. The ritual begins on the flagstone facing the rising sun and continues with attendees reciting a creed, 5 Our Fathers and 5 Hail Marys on each side of the well. When the prayers are completed their eyes are washed with water from the well. Small offerings such as flowers are left on a nearby bush. The well's source is a nearby stream. Legend claims that Saint Patrick baptised people in the well when he visited the area. St. Columba's Headache Well is located in the village of Terryglass. It is named after Columba and is alleged to cure headaches and migraines.

== Sport and recreation ==
Shannon Rovers GAA, which incorporates Terryglass, Kilbarron and surrounding areas, is based in Páirc an Phobail, Ballinderry. The club's jersey colours are red and white.

Shannon Rangers FC is a local association football (soccer) club. Also based in Páirc an Phobail, its kit colours are black with red trim for the junior team, and red and black vertical stripes for underage levels.

Terryglass is on one of several north Tipperary Cycle Routes. This 65 km route starts at Banba Square, Nenagh and is listed as a half day cycle.

Terryglass is a common location for boating, having both public and private marinas.

== Notable residents, past and present ==
- Columba of Terryglass (died 13 December 552) was one of the Twelve Apostles of Ireland. He founded the monastery of Terryglass in 548 and was buried within its precincts
- Áed Ua Crimthainn (fl. 12th century), abbot and scribe of Terryglass
- Rickard Deasy, farming campaigner
- Sir William Hickie, an Irish-born Major General of the British Army and an Irish nationalist politician, lived in Slevoir
- Martin O'Meara VC (born 1882), recipient of the Victoria Cross

== Annalistic references ==
See Annals of Inisfallen (AI)

- AI717.1 Kl.Repose of Manchán of Liath, and of Congertach, abbot of Tír dá Glas.
- AI740.1 Kl. Maenchíne, abbot of Tuaim Gréine, and Cillíne, abbot of Tír dá Glas, [rested].
- AI777.4 The drowning of more than a hundred of the Connachta at Tír dá Glas.
- AI784.3 Repose of Cumascach, abbot of Tír dá Glas.
- AI844.1 Kl. The plundering of Dún Másc, in which Aed son of Dub dá Chrích, abbot of Tír dá Glas, fell.
- AI895.2 Repose of Mael Petair son of Cúán, abbot of Tír dá Glas and Cluain Ferta Brénainn.
- AFM905.2 Maelmordha, airchinneach of Tir-da-ghlas, died.
- AI965.1 Kl. Repose of Dunchad, abbot of Tír dá Glas.
- AI1008.2 Repose of Céilechair son of Donn Cuan, abbot of Tír dá Glas.

== See also ==
- List of civil parishes of Tipperary
- Cormac mac Ceithearnach
- List of towns and villages in the Republic of Ireland
