= Irish bardic poetry =

Poetry produced by trained Irish bardic poets

Bardic poetry is the writings produced by a class of poets trained in the bardic schools of Ireland and the Gaelic parts of Scotland, as they existed down to about the middle of the 17th century or, in Scotland, the early 18th century. Most of the texts preserved are in Middle Irish or in early Modern Irish. Even though the manuscripts were very plentiful, very few have been published. It is considered a period of great literary stability due to the formalised literary language that changed very little.

== Background ==
According to the Uraicecht Becc in Old Irish Law, bards and filid were distinct groups: filid involved themselves with law, language, lore and court poetry, whereas bards were versifiers. However, in time, these terms came to be used interchangeably. With the arrival of Christianity, the poets were still given a high rank in society, equal to that of a bishop, but even the highest-ranked poet, the ollamh, was now only 'the shadow of a high-ranking pagan priest or druid.' The bards memorized and preserved the history and traditions of clan and country, as well as the technical requirements of the various poetic forms, such as the dán díreach (a syllabic form which uses assonance, half rhyme and alliteration).

Much of their work consists of extended genealogies and almost journalistic accounts of the deeds of their lords and ancestors: the Irish bard was not necessarily an inspired poet, but rather a professor of literature and letters, highly trained in the use of a polished literary medium, belonging to a hereditary caste of high prestige in a conservative, aristocratic society, and holding an official position therein by virtue of extensive training and knowledge.

== Role in Irish and Scottish society ==
As officials of the court of king or chieftain, they performed a number of official roles, such as chroniclers and satirists. Effectively, their job was to praise their employers and curse those who crossed them. Their approach to official duties was very traditional and drawn from precedent, rather like the roles played by Welsh bards and Viking skalds, with a similar emphasis on complex, often highly alliterative forms of verse. However, even though many bardic poets were traditional in their approach, there were also some who added personal feelings into their poems and also had the ability to adapt with changing situations although conservative.

While they were employed by kings and other powerful figures in Irish society, bards also acted independently and were highly respected individuals for their own power. Irish society focused largely on a fame or shame mentality. Which one you received largely depended on if the bard liked you or not, therefore, many people would go out of their way to please the bards in the hopes that they would get a song or poem composed about them. The Irish people had no illusions about death, knowing that everything eventually died, but they believed the way into immortality was through a great story that only a bard could compose. This led the bards to have great power among the Irish because the ability to provide great fame or great shame to any individual.

The bardic tradition was incredibly important to Irish society and even infatuated many outsiders. This sparked a tradition of founding bardic schools which often only would teach to people that had a bard in their family history. Other requirements included being skilled at reading and having a good memory. In these schools the fundamentals of being a bard were taught and often students would have to compose overnight so as to not be able to write things down, therefore keeping the oral tradition alive. The next morning they would be allowed to write them down, perform them, and critique their compositions. Overall, these schools were at least partly responsible for keeping the bardic tradition alive into the modern era.

== Example ==
The following is an example of a bardic poem from the translations of Osborn Bergin:

Consolations

Filled with sharp dart-like pens
Limber tipped and firm, newly trimmed
Paper cushioned under my hand
Percolating upon the smooth slope
The leaf a fine and uniform script
A book of verse in ennobling Goidelic.

I learnt the roots of each tale, branch
Of valour and the fair knowledge,
That I may recite in learned lays
Of clear kindred stock and each person's
Family tree, exploits of wonder
Travel and musical branch
Soft voiced, sweet and slumberous
A lullaby to the heart.

Grant me the gladsome gyre, loud
Brilliant, passionate and polished
Rushing in swift frenzy, like a blue edged
Bright, sharp-pointed spear
In a sheath tightly corded;
The cause itself worthy to contain.

Anonymous

== Bardic texts ==
- Tinnakill Duanaire
- Royal Irish Academy MS 24 P 33
- 23 N 10
- The Book of the White Earl
- Egerton 1782
- Saltair na Rann

== Selected poets ==
- Dallán Forgaill (c. 530 – c. 598)
- Colmán mac Lénéni (530–606)
- Niníne Éces (fl. 700)
- Óengus Céile Dé (d. 824)
- Saint Dungal (fl. 811 – 828)
- Sedulius Scottus (fl. 840 – 860)
- Flann mac Lonáin (d. 896)
- Cináed Ua Hartacáin (d. 975)
- Mael Ísu Ó Brolcháin (d. 1086)
- Gilla Cómáin mac Gilla Samthainde (fl. 1072)
- Gilla Mo Dutu Úa Caiside (fl. 1147)
- Muireadhach Albanach (fl. early 13th century)
- Giolla Brighde Mac Con Midhe (c. 1210 – c. 1272)
- Donnchadh Mór Ó Dálaigh (d. 1244)
- Máeleoin Bódur Ó Maolconaire (d. 1266)
- Gofraidh Fionn Ó Dálaigh (d. 1387)
- Seaán Ó Clumháin (fl. 1450 – 1500)
- Aithbhreac Inghean Coirceadal (fl. 1470)
- Paidin mac Lochlainn Ó Mailchonaire (d. 1506)
- Fear Feasa Ó'n Cháinte (fl. 16th century)
- Eoghan Carrach Ó Siadhail (fl. c. 1500 – c. 1550)
- Fear Flatha Ó Gnímh (c. 1540 – c. 1630)
- Tadhg Dall Ó hÚigínn (c. 1550 – c. 1591)
- Baothghalach Mór Mac Aodhagáin (1550–1600)
- Eochaidh Ó hÉoghusa (1567–1617)
- Mathghamhain Ó hIfearnáin (fl. 1585)
- Muircheartach Ó Cobhthaigh (fl. 1586)
- Tadhg Olltach Ó an Cháinte (fl. c. 1601)
- Lochlann Óg Ó Dálaigh (fl. c. 1610)
- Cú Choigcríche Ó Cléirigh (fl. 1624 – 1664)
- Cormac Mac Con Midhe (d. 1627)
- Cearbhall Óg Ó Dálaigh (fl. 1630)
- Diarmaid Mac an Bhaird (fl. 1670)
- Proinsias Ó Doibhlin (d. c. 1724)
- Tarlach Rua Mac Dónaill (fl. early 18th century)

== Selected poems ==
- Le dís cuirthear clú Laighean
- Is acher in gaíth in-nocht...
- Is trúag in ces i mbiam
- Sen dollotar Ulaid ...
- An Díbirt go Connachta
- Foraire Uladh ar Aodh
- A theachtaire tig ón Róimh
- An sluagh sidhe so i nEamhuin?
- Cóir Connacht ar chath Laighean
- Dia libh a laochruidh Gaoidhiol
- Pangur Bán
- Liamuin
- Buile Shuibhne
- The Prophecy of Berchán
- Bean Torrach, fa Tuar Broide

== See also ==
- Early Irish literature
- Irish poetry
- Irish syllabic poetry
- Dán díreach
