= Irish syllabic poetry =

Literary form

Irish syllabic poetry, also known in its later form as Dán díreach (1200–1600), is the name given to complex syllabic poetry in the Irish language as written by monastic poets from the eighth century on, and later by professional poets in Ireland and Gaelic Scotland.

The monastic poets borrowed from both native and Latin traditions to create elaborate syllabic verse forms, and used them for religious and nature poetry. The concerns of the highly trained professional poets were mostly secular. They regarded themselves and were regarded by others as an integral part of the social and intellectual elite of medieval Ireland, a fact expressed through a subtle and cultivated poetic diction. The form and function of this poetry cannot be separated, therefore, from a particular social and cultural context.

== History ==
=== Early monastic era ===
The seven or eight syllable line typical of formal Irish verse is derived from an ancient Indo-European metrical tradition. The Irish combination of end-rhyme, internal rhyme and alliteration, however, derives ultimately from the example of late Latin hymns, as elaborated by Irish monks. Such rhyme first appears in Latin hymns of the third and fourth centuries. Its use was taught by the late Classical writer Virgilius Marus Grammaticus, whose writings were well known in Ireland, and rhyme is found in some of the earliest Irish Latin hymns. Irish monks used rhyme in Latin in a more elaborate way than on the continent, an example being a hymn to Saint Martin by Oengus mac Tipraiti (d. 745):

Martinus mirus more
ore laudavit Deum:
pure corde cantavit
atque laudavit eum.

(Martin, the wonderful, by custom praised God aloud; with pure heart he sang and praised Him.)

From this Latin practice and the native metrical tradition there developed complex vernacular verse. An example is a short poem by an Irish missionary monk in a ninth century manuscript in Saint Gall, Switzerland (with rhyme, assonance and alliteration here marked):

Daith bech buide a húaim i n-úaim
ní súail a uide la gréin:
fó for fuluth sa mag már
dag a dagchomhal 'na chéir.

(Nimble is the yellow bee going from flower to hollow flower, no trifling journey in the sun; it flies boldly into the great plain, then returns to good company in the waxy hive.)

Such monastic lyrics appear from around the eighth century on, inspired by love of Nature, love of solitude and love of the Divine. They have been described as the finest Irish poetry of their age.

=== Later use ===
The professional poets had long praised famous men and continued to do so, but adopted the new and sophisticated verse forms invented in the monastic environment.

Secular poetry of this sort was mostly used for praise poetry and elegy. There are a comparatively small number of poems of a personal or satirical nature. It has been observed that the praise poem possibly represented a survival of paganism, insofar as it was thought to enhance the good fortune of the lord (the poet's patron) to whom it was addressed. It has also been noted that the trained professional poet was a court official employed for a specific purpose and was esteemed accordingly. Such a poet expected to be handsomely remunerated. Poets belonged to particular families and each poet had a particular aristocratic patron, though it was acceptable to visit patrons other than one's own.

There are also examples of praise poems written for aristocratic women, usually referring to their descent, their beauty, their generosity and their other admirable qualities.

The professional literati had their own schools, often referred to in English as bardic schools, but in Irish simply as scoileanna. In them it was expected that pupils would master the complex forms of their art and acquire knowledge of Irish history and literature. There were graduated ranks, with the lower ranks including women. A pupil would need to attend such a school for six or seven years before being eligible to reach the summit of his profession.

The poets used a standard literary dialect, which was taught, it is likely, in the schools from the early 13th century on and which lasted unchanged until the 17th century, regardless of the changes which were occurring in popular speech. There were manuals for the purpose, composed perhaps in the fifteenth century and containing samples of the work of acknowledged masters. These continued to be used until the collapse of the traditional Gaelic hierarchy in the 17th century.

Once composed, the poem would be recited in the patron's presence by a reacaire or professional reciter, accompanied by the harp. The poems so written were collected in “books” of manuscripts, with each notable family having its own, and of which a few examples have survived. Verse of this sort was held to be essential for maintaining family reputation.

Dá mbáidhthí an dán, a dhaoine,
gan seanchas gan seanlaoidhe,
go bráth, acht athair gach fhir,
rachaidh cách gan a chluinsin.

(If, O my people, the poem were obliterated forever, with its knowledge and ancient craft, all except what a man might know of his father, all reputation would be lost.)

== Other functions ==
Verse of this sort could be a vehicle for magical harm or aoir (called “satire” in English, though with only partial accuracy), leading to injury or death. This has been called “a most extraordinary survival from an earlier and pre-Christian phase of Celtic life”.

Syllabic verse could also be used for more personal reflection on landscape, music, love or loss. An example is “A Chláirsioch Chnuic Í Chosgair” by Gofraidh Fionn Ó Dálaigh (-1387):

A chláirsioch chnuic Í Chosgair
chuirios súan ar siorrosgaibh,
a nuallánach bhinn bhlasda,
ghrinn fhuaránach fhorasda...

(Harp of the Hill of Ó Coscair, bringing sleep to eyes long sleepless, speaking with a low sweet cry, clear, refreshing, grave...)

== Replacement by accentual verse ==
Seventeenth century Ireland, which experienced periods of great political turmoil, saw the gradual replacement of aristocratic native patrons by incomers of mostly English origin who had little interest in indigenous traditions. The poets responded by lamenting the passing of the old order in the elaborate syllabic metres they had mastered in the scoileanna. More and more, however, they composed verse in accentual metres whose metrical complexity recalled that of dán díreach but which were easier to master.

An example of the transition is the oeuvre of Dáibhí Ó Bruadair (c.1625-1698), whose life covered almost the entire century and whose work contains examples of both kinds of verse.

By the eighteenth century accentual verse was fully accepted in Ireland, though the older tradition was preserved in manuscripts. In Gaelic-speaking Scotland dán díreach persisted for longer, though already accentual (sung) poetry had come to the fore, as exemplified by the work of Màiri nighean Alasdair Ruaidh (c.1615–c.1707).

== Technique in dán díreach ==
Poems in dán díreach were written in quatrains. Most Irish poetry from the thirteenth to the seventeenth century is composed in metres requiring

- A fixed number of syllables (usually seven) in each line,
- Rhyme, or consonance, in the final word of each verse or couplet.

Each line contains a certain number of stressed syllables, usually four. A pause divides the line into two halves, with half-lines end in disyllables. Some of the stressed syllables in every line alliterate, though there is considerable variety in the distribution of alliteration.

=== Rhyme ===
The classical rhyming scheme allows for the rhyming of groups of different consonants. They can arranged as follows:

1. Group “b”: b, g & d rhyme with each other (e.g. gad & lag | foda & coda| géag & séad | leanab & sealad).
2. Group “c”: c, p & t rhyme with each other (e.g. cnoc & sop | maca & slata).
3. Group “ch”: ch, ph & th rhyme with each other (e.g. sgeach & cleath | Life & ithe | eich & beith).
4. Group “bh”: bh, gh, dh, l, mh, n & r rhyme with each other (e.g. neamh & feadh | taraidh & adhaigh | ionadh & iodhan | teagh & treabh | eibhe & meile).
5. Group “ll”: ll, m(m), ng, nn & rr rhyme with each other (e.g. mall & barr & crann & am | long & fonn & corr | druim & tuill | cluineam & fuigheall).
6. Group “s”: s rhymes only with itself.

=== A metrical example (Deibhidhe) ===
One of the most common classical metres is deibhidhe, written in quatrain form with seven syllables in each line. The metrical structure is as follows:

- The last word of lines 1 and 3 must rhyme with the unstressed final syllable of the last word in lines 2 and 4 (a pattern called rinn and airdrinn, in which a stressed word in one line rhymes with an unstressed word in the line below).
- Two internal rhymes are needed between lines 3 and 4.
- Two words in each line must alliterate with each other.
- The final word of line 4 must alliterate with the preceding stressed word.

Tugtha d’Albain na sreabh seang
a cóir féin d’inis Éirinn,
críoch aimhréidh na n-eas mbanna,
suil bheas aimhréidh eatarra.

(Let Scotland of the narrow streams render what is right to the island of Ireland, hilly land of shining waterfalls, before they fall into dispute.)

== See also ==
- Dán díreach
- Irish bardic poetry
- Irish poetry
