= Brian Mac Con Midhe =

Brian Mac Con Midhe was an Irish poet and writer who was active during the 1590s.

A son of Aonghus Mac Con Midhe, Brian was a member of an Irish brehon family, and chief poet to Turlough Luineach O'Neill.

== See also ==
- Giolla Brighde Mac Con Midhe (fl. 1210?–1272?)
- Teige Mac Con Midhe
- Cormac Mac Con Midhe (d.1627)
