= Dia libh a laochruidh Gaoidhiol =

Poem in Irish, from the 16th century

Dia libh a laochruidh Gaoidhiol is a poem by Aonghas Mac Daighre Uí Dhálaigh. The title can be translated as 'God be with you, O war-band of the Gaels.'

== Background ==
Aonghus Mac Daighre Ó Dálaigh (sometimes known as Aonghus Fionn Ó Dálaigh, or Enyes O Dalye, of Palees' or 'Enos O Dalie' of 'Pallice') was a poet from a prominent bardic family, patronised for centuries by the MacCarthy's of Desmond. He was a descendant of Raghnall Ó Dálaigh whose death is noted in the Annals of the Four Masters.

Fifty-four poems in total are accredited to Aonghus Fionn Ó Dálaigh, only five of which deal with secular topics - he stated that he disliked writing bardic praise poems for Gaelic chieftains.

== Text of the poem ==
The poem is written as a call to arms, inviting young Irishmen to fight for God against the Tudor conquest of Ireland. In the poem, Uí Dhálaigh

"contrasts the hardship endured by the Uí Bhroin (Byrne) on the Wicklow mountains, not with the ease they would have enjoyed in peace-time, but with the prosperity of their Anglo-Irish enemies occupying the fertile lowlands which were once the patrimony of the Uí Bhroin themselves. ... [it belongs] ... to the late sixteenth century, when the original idea of the contrast between ease and hardship had become perhaps a little hackneyed, and required some new slant to lift it out of the commonplace."

== In Translation and Reprint ==
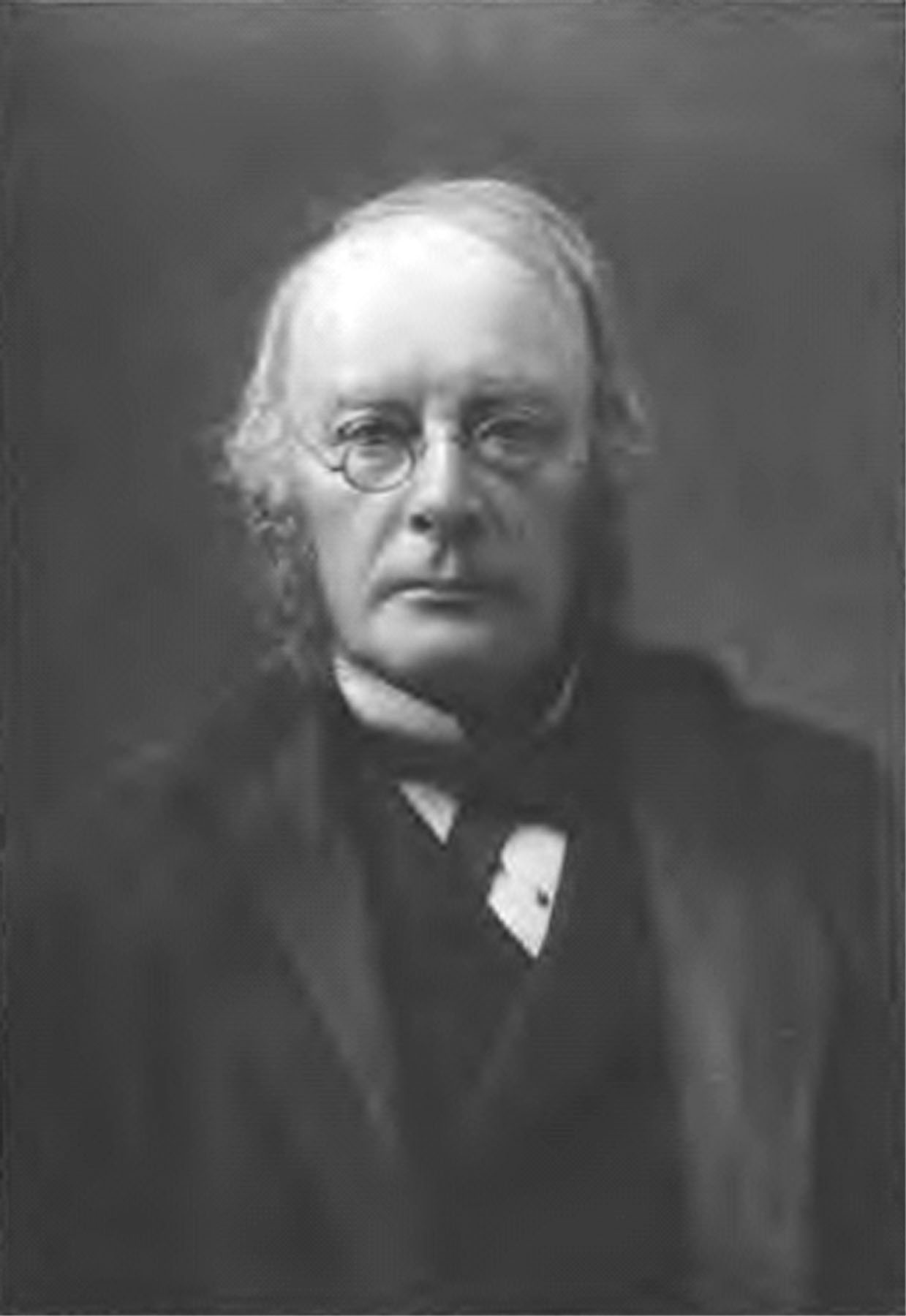
Sir Samuel Ferguson, who anthologised the poem in Irish Minstrelsy

Dia libh a laochruidh Gaoidhiol is the 16th century Irish language poem that most influenced generations of Irish nationalists. It was included in Leabhar Branach in the early 17th century and by Samuel Ferguson in "Irish Minstrelsy" in the 19th century, who noted:

He appears to be animated by hope and trust in God, and by deep love of his own country and nation. If he were to come to life again and meet the present Anglicised descendants of the sturdy warriors of Ballinacor, what would he think? To use his own words, do cuirfidhe a meanma i míneart... Most of this poem could be applied to the present time.

Ferguson translated the poem into English under the title "God Be With The Irish Host".
