= Mac Con Midhe =

Gaelic Irish family of poets

Mac Con Midhe was the name of a family of poets in Gaelic Ireland. The name is also now rendered as Mac Namee, McNamee, Conmee, and McConway.

== Overview ==
There was a branch of this Ulster sept who were erenaghs of Comber, on the River Foyle in the deanery of Derry, and they are recorded as such as late as 1606 when Bishop Montgomery's survey of the diocese was made. Just about that time the Ulster Plantation records show the name Mac Con Midhe among the natives of County Tyrone and later in the century the name appeared in Charles O'Neill's regiment in James II's Irish army. Tyrone and Derry is where the name is mainly found today. That was not the case in the 17th century. Petty's "census" found them most numerous in County Leitrim and in the previous century the "Fiants" show that they were in Leitrim and other parts of Connacht bordering Ulster, as well as in Derry and Donegal.

The Annals of Loch Cé tell us that in the 13th century the chief of Muintir Laoideacháin on the border of Connacht and north-west Leinster was Mac Con Meadha. In Carew's list (1602) of the gentry of County Clare and their castles, Teige Oge MacConmea of Neadenurry is found; this could be an error for MacConway. It is stated that the sept of MacNamee was seated beside the Shannon in the barony of Kilkenny west County Westmeath.

In 1875, the Conmees of Kingsland were among the leading gentry of County Roscommon. As the name MacNamee is now rare in Connacht, it may be assumed that survivors of the septin that province have become Conmee, which has been widely absorbed in the well-known surname Conway.

== Notables ==
- Giolla Brighde Mac Con Midhe (fl. 1210?-1272?)
- Teige Mac Con Midhe (died 1493)
- Brian Mac Con Midhe, chief poet to Turlough Luineach O'Neill
- Cormac Mac Con Midhe (died 1627)

Cormac is considered one of the last of the poets of the classical phase of Gaelic civilization.
