= Alliteration (Latin) =

The term alliteration was invented by the Italian humanist Giovanni Pontano (1426–1503), in his dialogue Actius, to describe the practice common in Virgil, Lucretius, and other Roman writers of beginning words or syllables with the same consonant or vowel. He gives examples such as Sale Saxa Sonābant "the rocks were resounding with the salt-water" or Anchīsēn Agnōvit Amīcum "he recognised his friend Anchises" or Multā Mūnīta Virum Vī "defended by a great force of men".

Pontano also used the term alliteration to refer to repetition of letters in medial positions. Among other kinds, he mentions the frequent case when the last syllable of a word begins with the same consonant as the first syllable of the next word, as in lōRīcam ex aeRe Rigentem "the rigid breastplate made of bronze" (Virgil). Since "x" is pronounced [ks], the phrase Sale SaXa Sonābant "the rocks were resounding with sea water" (Virgil) can also be considered an example of this kind. This kind of alliteration is referred to by some writers as consonance.

Alliteration was a prominent feature of Latin literature (in contrast to Greek), especially in poetry in the 3rd to 1st centuries BC, and continued to be used by some writers even in the Middle Ages.

== Definitions ==
Scholars differ as to how alliteration should be defined. Some, such as Keith Maclennan (2017), suggest that the term alliteration should be used only of repeated sounds at the beginning of words, and assonance of sounds repeated in another context. Tracy Peck (1884) also gives examples only of word-initial alliteration.

However, Pontano himself, who invented the term, used it also of the alliteration of medial consonants. The French scholars A. Cordier (1939) and Jules Marouzeau (1933) similarly define it as "the repetition, near or exact, of a phoneme or group of phonemes at the beginning of syllables (e.g. fanfare) or at the beginning of words (e.g. bel et bien) nearby one another in the utterance."

The German classicist August Ferdinand Naeke (1829) also accepted internal alliteration and cited examples such as paene eFFrēgistī Fatue Foribus cardinēs "you've nearly broken the hinges of the door, you idiot!" (Plautus), in which the first F, though medial, clearly contributes to the effect of the whole.

The Lucretius specialists Cyril Bailey (1947) and Margaret Deutsch (1939), on the other hand, give a slightly different definition. They define alliteration as the repetition of consonants (whether initial or medial), and assonance as the repetition of vowel sounds or of syllables. From the examples Bailey gives, such as ipse, it is clear that he considered that consonants at the end of syllables and words could contribute to alliteration as well as those at the beginning.

Thus when several words in a row begin with the same vowel, as in Incidit Ictus Ingēns ad terram "the huge man, struck, falls to the ground" (Virgil), some scholars follow Pontano in referring to it as alliteration, while others use the term assonance.

Conversely, when a medial consonant is involved, as in SaXa Sonābant, it is called "internal alliteration" by Bailey but would be considered as assonance by Maclennan.

Writing in Latin in the 12th century, Gerald of Wales defines alliteration as "that kind of annominatio (paronomasia) in which the initial letters or syllables of words are linked together". He gives a Latin example from the Aeneid: tālēs cāsūs Cassandra canēbat (Aen. 3.183) "such misfortunes Cassandra was singing", in which the syllables cās, cass and ca are used in successive words.

== Compound alliteration ==
Although simple alliteration involving only the initial consonants of words is very common, in Latin authors of all periods it will often be found that primary alliteration on an initial consonant is accompanied by a secondary or "minor" alliteration on a medial consonant. Thus Cicero's Patent Portae "the gates are open" as well as the primary alliteration of P has minor alliteration of T. Occasionally there are two minor consonants involved, as in Lacūs Lūcōsque "lakes and groves" (Cicero) or Serpentum Spīrīs "with coils of snakes" (Virgil).

In other examples, the same consonant occurs both initially and medially, e.g. Cum seCūrī CaudiCālī (Plautus) and CaeCō Carpitur (Virgil) with C, or lōRīcam ex aeRe Rigentem (Virgil) with R. Often two different consonants are involved in the same phrase, partly initial and partly medial: Magnae MeTūs TuMulTus (Naevius) and nē Mē TerrēTe TiMenTem (Virgil) with M and T; MoLLīs LaMbere fLaMMa coMās and MoLLīs fLaMMa MeduLLās with M and L (Virgil); and RēGī dē GRaeciā (Nepos), RēGīna GRavī (Virgil) and peRGe ... dīRiGe GRessum (Virgil) with R and G.

Any account of alliteration in Latin must therefore take such cases into consideration. However, as Bailey warns, caution must be observed in recognising such examples, as the internal alliteration may sometimes be accidental.

== Alliteration and assonance ==
Alliteration frequently overlaps with assonance, which is defined by one dictionary as "a resemblance in the sounds of words or syllables, either between their vowels (e.g. meat, bean) or between their consonants (e.g. keep, cape)". (This latter kind is also known as consonance.)

By this definition some of the examples which Naeke in the 19th century called alliteration, such as fūr trifurcifer "thief who wears three yokes" (Plautus), neque fīctum, neque pīctum, neque scrīptum "it's never been imagined, or painted, or written" (Plautus), or labōrāt ē dolōre "she is overcome with grief" (Terence) would usually these days be referred to as assonance.

Often alliteration and assonance are combined, as in sanguine Largō coLL' armōsque Lavant "with copious blood they wash their necks and shoulders" (Virgil), where there is alliteration of L L L, but also assonance of A AR AR A.

== Examples of alliteration ==
=== In popular phrases ===
The earliest appearance of alliteration in Latin seems to have been not in poetry but in proverbs and popular sayings, and phrases of a religious or legal character. Examples of popular phrases are: Oleum et Operam perdere "to waste both oil and time", Cavē Canem "beware of the dog", Vīvus Vidēnsque "alive and well", Satis Superque "enough and more", Albus an Āter "white or black", Pūblica Prīvāta "public and private", and so on. Legal and religious phrases included such as Tabulae Testēsque "tablets and witnesses", Ārae et Altāria "altars and shrines", Tēcta Templa "houses and temples", Fortēs Fidēlēs "brave and loyal", Fūsī Fugātī "routed and put to flight", Fors Fortūna "Chance and Fortune". Frequently such alliterating phrases show asyndeton, i.e. the two words are placed side by side with no conjunction such as et "and". Another example of this is the boast Vēnī Vīdī Vīcī "I came, I saw, I conquered" attributed to Julius Caesar.

It has been noted that in these phrases that if one of two alliterated words has an "a" in it, it is usually placed second: Ferrō Flammāque "by sword and flame", Longē Lātēque "far and wide", Collēs Campīque "hills and plains", Multī et Magnī "many and great". When the words are of unequal length, the shorter one usually precedes: Fāma Fortūna "fame and fortune", Aurum Argentum "gold and silver", Cūra Custōdiaque "care and custody", and so on. As both Peck and Cordier noted, the Latin language naturally lends itself to such phrases, making them part of everyday speech. Some apparent examples of alliteration therefore are likely to be fortuitous, for example Jesus's saying egō sum Via et Vēritās et Vīta "I am the Way, the Truth, and the Life" (John 14.6), which is translated from a non-alliterating Greek original.

=== In prayers ===
Some of the early prayers (carmina) which survive, such as the one which begins as follows, are partly alliterative, but the alliteration is not maintained throughout the prayer:

Mārs PaTer, Tē Precor quaesōque
utī siēs volēns ProPiTius
"Father Mars, I pray and beg you
that you be willing and propitious"

It contains alliterative lines such as this:

Pāstōrēs Pecuaque Salva Servāssis
"that you may keep the herdsmen and the cattle safe"

However, much of the prayer is not alliterative. McGann (1958) concludes that alliteration is an important but occasional device which adds greatly to the effect of the composition, but does not perform a structural function in the carmen as a whole.

=== In poetry ===
==== Early Latin poetry ====
The earliest Latin poems, unlike early Germanic and English poetry, do not have obligatory alliteration. Most of the fragments of the early accentual Saturnian poetry listed by Lindsay exhibit no alliteration, although some do, for example the following line, attributed to Naevius (c.270–c.201 BC), which has alliteration of M, P, and T:

Magnae MeTūs TuMulTus PecTora Possīdit
"A tumult of great fear possesses their hearts"

The epic poet Ennius (c.239–c.169 BC) made very frequent use of alliteration. In the following example, the alliteration emphasises the noise of trees crashing to the ground. The most obvious alliteration is at the beginning of words, but there is also internal alliteration of the letter t:

FRaxinus FRangitur atque Abiēs cōnsternitur Alta,
Pīnūs Procerās Pervortunt; omne Sonābat
arbustum FRemitū Silvāī FRondōsāī
"The ash tree crashes and the tall fir is cut down,
they overturn tall pines; every grove
of the leafy forest was resounding with noise"

To a greater extent than later poets, Ennius often uses the same alliteration throughout the line:

nec Cum Capta Capī, nec Cum Combusta Cremārī
"nor stay captured when captured, nor burn when set on fire"

Another famous line of Ennius is the following:

ō TiTe, TūTe, TaTī, Tibi TanTa, Tyranne, TulisTī!
"O Titus Tatius, you yourself, o king, have brought such great (troubles) on yourself!"

The following trochaic septenarius line is from his tragedy Alexander. The principal alliteration is M, but there is secondary alliteration of T, L, and R:

Mātēr, opti/Mārum Multō // Mulier Meliōr / Mulierum
"Mother, best woman by far of the best of women!"

In the following hexameter, the primary alliteration with T is supported by a secondary medial alliteration of R to reinforce the idea of terror and trembling:

Āfrica Terribilī Tremit horrida Terra Tumultū
"The rough land of Africa trembles with terrifying tumult."

T and R are also used in the following often-quoted line. It was quoted with disapproval for its excessive alliteration in the Rhetorica ad Herennium 4.12, and some modern critics have called it "almost absurd" or "embarrassing".

at Tuba Terribilī sonitū TaraTantara dīxit
"but the trumpet with terrifying sound went 'taratantara!'"

Another Ennius example, which Austin describes as "noble", is the following iambic octonarius. Here there is assonance between Magna Templa ... and -Mixta sTellīs at corresponding places in the two halves of the line, combined with alliteration of C, S, and minor alliteration of P and L:

ō Magna Templa Caelitum ComMixta Stellīs Splendidīs
"O great temples of the heaven-dwellers, mixed with splendid stars."

Pacuvius, a nephew of and pupil of Ennius, was famous as a writer of tragedies. Aulus Gellius quotes the following verses, calling them iūcundissimī "very delightful". They are rich in alliteration of m, l, and n, and also assonance of ul repeated four times:

cedo tuum pedem mī, Lymphīs Flāvīs Fulvum ut
pulverem manibus īsdem, quibus Ulixī saepe permulsī,
abluam Lassitūdinemque Minuam Manuum Mollitūdine
"give me your foot, so that with yellow water I can wash off the brown
dust with these same hands with which I often bathed Ulysses,
and lessen your tiredness with the softness of my hands"

The comic playwright Plautus also has innumerable instances of alliteration, usually for comic effect:

nōn Potuit Paucīs Plūra Plānē Prōloquī.
"He couldn't in a few words have said more in a plain way."

tē Cum seCūrī CaudiCālī Praeficiō Prōvinciae
"You with the axe, I'm putting you in charge of the wood-cutting province!"

Perdite Perduellēs, Parite Laudem et Lauream, ut Vōbīs Victī Poenī Poenās sufferant
"Destroy the enemies, get praise and laurels, so that conquered by you the Carthaginians may suffer the penalty"

The other surviving comic playwright, Terence, by contrast, used alliteration hardly at all, and this is a major difference between his work and that of Plautus. Naeke, who quotes numerous examples from Plautus, can cite only a few from Terence, including the following:

Profundat, Perdat, Pereat: nihil ad mē attinet!
"Let him squander it, lose it, and perish; I don't care!"

==== Classical period poetry ====
Cicero has frequent examples of alliteration in his poetry, but usually involving only two or three words in any one verse. In the following lines, which describe the killing of Orion by the Scorpion as depicted in the stars, the primary alliteration of V V V is accompanied by minor alliteration of D, C, T, F and R:

hic Validō cupidē Vēnantem perculit ictū
mortiferum in Vēnās fundēns per Volnera Vīrus
"this struck him down, when he was eagerly hunting, with a powerful blow,
pouring deadly poison through the wounds into his veins"

Lucretius used alliteration widely, "with striking power in many memorable passages" (Austin), for example the following, where P, C, Q and R are mingled:

inde ferae Pecudēs Persultant Pābula laeta
et Rapidōs tRānant amnīs: ita Capta lepōre
tē seQuitur Cupidē Quō QuamQue indūCere Pergis
"then wild beasts gambol over the joyful fields
and swim across rapid streams; so, captured by delight,
they follow you eagerly wherever you proceed to lead each one"

In Catullus and Horace alliteration occurs much less frequently. Nonetheless, even in Catullus there are lines such as the following with its alternation of C, G, T and D sounds, which appear to imitate the shaking of a tambourine:

QuatiēnsQue Terga Taurī Tenerīs Cava Digitīs
Canere haec suīs adorta est Tremebunda Comitibus.
"And shaking the hollow back of a bull with her tender fingers
she began to sing as follows, trembling, to her companions."

In his lament for his dead brother the chiastic alliteration F M M F is reinforced by minor alliteration of T:

accipe Frāternō Multum Mānantia Flētū
"Receive these gifts soaked with brotherly tears."

In Virgil, where alliteration is frequent, it is "no longer an external ornament ... but an inner secret of sound, subtly employed to serve emotion" (Austin). In the following example, the repetition of M, T, D, R, L, and V emphasise Aeneas's amazement and perplexity:

Aeneas, MiraTus enim MoTusque TuMulTu,
‘Dic,’ ait, ‘o Virgo, quid Vult concursus ad amnem?
quidve petunt animae? vel quo DiscRimine Ripas
hae Linquunt, iLLae Remis VaDa LiViDa VeRRunt?
Aeneas, for he was amazed and moved by the tumult,
said "Tell me, o Virgin, what does this thronging to the river signify?
Or what are the souls seeking? Or by what criterion do these
abandon the river banks, while those sweep the dark shallows with oars?"

Another example is the following line, in which the consonants in the first half of the line (CRNT, MTS) are mirrored by those in the second half (MTS, CRNT), emphasising the words maestōs "sad", mortis "of death", and carentēs "lacking":

Cernit ibī Maestōs et Mortis honōre Carentēs
"There he discerns, sad, and lacking the honour of death"

Propertius occasionally uses alliteration, as in the opening couplet of his love elegies, where in addition to the main alliteration of C on the key words, there is secondary alliteration of p, m, t, n, and l:

Cynthia prīma suīs Miserum Mē Cēpit oCellīs,
Contāctum nūllīs ante Cupīdinibus.
"Cynthia was the first woman to capture wretched me with her little eyes,
I who had never experienced the contagion of any desires before."

Ovid employs alliteration much less obviously than Lucretius and Virgil. He sometimes seems to play with words, as when Apollo tells his son Phaethon:

nē Dubitā! Dabitur
"Do not doubt! It will be given."

Similar examples in Ovid are: Pārēte Perītō ... Carmine Crīmen ... Petitur Pariter ... Tyriōs..Torōs ... oCCulit et Colitur ... Parce Precor ... Praesentis..Prōsit, in each of which three or even four consonants are repeated in the same order in the second word.

On the whole Ovid's alliteration is occasional rather than pervasive. An example where the alliteration emphasises the poet's emotion at the death of his friend Tibullus is:

Tēne, sacer vātes, flammae Rapuēre Rogālēs,
Pectoribus Pāscī nec Timuēre Tuīs?
"Did the flames of the pyre seize you, sacred seer,
and not fear to feed on your breast?"

Kenney draws attention to the "dispersed alliteration" in lines like the following, where three key words, not placed consecutively, begin with M. There is secondary alliteration of p, r, t, l:

prīncipiīs obstā: sērō Medicīna parātur,
cum Mala per longās convaluēre Morās
"Resist from the beginning: the medicine is applied too late
when evils have grown stronger by a long delay"

Similar dispersed alliteration is also found in Virgil, for example the following, where the words futtilis "brittle", fulvā "yellow", and fragmina "fragments" are linked by the initial letter F, with secondary alliteration of l and r:

Mortālis Mucrō glaciēs ceu Futtilis ictū
dissiluit, Fulvā resplendent Fragmina harēnā.
"The human-made sword, like brittle ice, shattered with the blow,
and the fragments glitter on the yellow sand."

Similarly in the last three lines of the Aeneid the key words ferrum "steel", fervidus "hot", frigore "with cold" and fugit "flees" are linked by alliteration of F, with secondary alliteration of r and g:

hoc dīcens Ferrum adversō sub pectore condit
Fervidus; ast illī solvuntur Frīgore membra
vītaque cum gemitū Fugit indignāta sub umbrās.

"Saying this, (Aeneas) plunged the steel into the breast which was facing him, "hot with anger; but Turnus's limbs dissolved with cold, and his life with a groan flees indignantly down to the shadows."

In Lucan alliteration is also found, although not as commonly as in Virgil. His epic poem on the Civil War begins as follows, with an alliteration on C, P, SC, V:

bella per Ēmathiōs plūs quam Cīvīlia Campōs
iūSQue datum SCelerī canimus, Populumque Potentem
in sua Victrīcī conVersum Viscera dextrā
"We sing of wars worse than civil across the Emathian plains,
and of licence given to crime, and a powerful people
who turned against their own innards with victorious right hand."

Alliteration is rarely used in Juvenal and Martial, although there are occasional phrases such as the following from Juvenal:

Peritūrae ParCere Chartae
"to spare paper which is going to perish anyway"

or the following from Martial, in which L, C, and S are interwoven:

LasCīvōs Leporum Cursūs Lūsūsque Leōnum
"the playful races of hares and the games of lions"

=== In prose ===
Although alliteration is found most often in poetry, Pontano notes that prose writers also sometimes used it, and quotes from a sentence from Cicero's treatise Brutus:

nulla rēs magis penetrat in animōs eōsque Fingit Fōrmat Flectit
"Nothing penetrates their minds more and moulds, forms, and persuades them".

In his speeches, Cicero uses alliteration sparingly, but effectively, as in famous suggestion to Catiline:

PaTent PorTae; Proficīscere!
"The gates are open; depart!"

Again using assonance as well as alliteration, in an emotional moment of indignation in the pro Sulla he says:

cum illae īnFestae ac Fūnestae Facēs ... Cum Caedēs, Cum Cīvium Cruor, Cum Cinis patriae ... Coeperat ...
"when those hostile and calamitous torches ... when slaughter, when the blood of citizens, when the ashes of our fatherland had begun..."

Near the ending of the 2nd Philippic oration Cicero uses both alliteration and assonance to add force to an unexpected metaphor. The major alliteration, on stressed initial syllables, is D P P D P; but there is also internal or minor alliteration of L D D L as well as assonance of PAR PAR:

ut aLiquanDō DoLor PoPuLī Rōmānī Pariat quod iam Diū Parturit
"so that at long last the pain of the Roman people may give birth to what it has long been in labour with!"

In another example from the same paragraph of the 2nd Philippic, with alternation of M, R, and L, Cicero says:

ut MoRiēns popuLum RōMānum LībeRum ReLinquam
"that by dying I may leave the Roman people free."

Some orators evidently used alliteration too much, however, causing the author of the Rhetorica ad Herennium (c. 80 BC) to complain about eiusdem litterae nimia assiduitās "the excessive use of the same letter".

Among historians Nepos, according to Rolfe, used it "to excess". The following sentence is an example:

nōs eundem potissimum Thūcydidem auctōrem probāmus, quī illum ait Magnēsiae Morbō Mortuum Neque Negat Fuisse Fāmam venēnum Suā Sponte SūmpSiSSe, cum Sē, quae RēGī dē GRaeciā oPPrimendā Pollicitus esset, Praestāre Posse dēsPērāret.
"We approve especially of the same historian Thucydides, who says that he (Themistocles) died in Magnesia of an illness, but he does not deny that there is a rumour that he took poison of his own accord when he was despairing that he would be able to deliver what he had promised the King concerning the conquering of Greece."

Tacitus did not make great of use alliteration generally, but was fond of alliterative pairs of words such as Largītiō et Luxus "generosity and extravagance" or Socordia ducum, Sēditiōne legiōnum "by laziness of the generals, and insurrection of the legions".

Alliteration became very frequent again in north African authors of the 2nd and 3rd century A.D.: "It occurs on almost every page of Apuleius, Fronto, and Tertullian, and is very common in Cyprian." An example from Apuleius, in which the alliteration is reinforced by the rhythm of the line:

nē Deus quidem Delphicus ipse facile DisCerneret Duōbus nōbīs iaCentibus quis esset Magis Mortuus
"Not even the god of Delphi himself would easily discern which of the two of us lying there was the more dead"

Another example from Apuleius, using compound alliteration of Pr and Pl, is the following:

sic insulas quam Proxumas et terrae Plusculum Provinciasque Plurimas fama Porrecta Pervagatur
"So the news spread through the nearest islands and a good part of the mainland and most of the provinces"

Kenney compares the following sentence of Tacitus, with similar alliteration but less extensive:

unde fama eius evecta insulas et Proximas Provincias Pervagata per Italiam quoque celebratur
"from where his fame, having been carried to the islands and having spread through the nearest provinces, was celebrated throughout Italy also."

== Statistical studies ==
Some scholars have performed statistical studies on different poets. Clarke (1976) compared Virgil and Ovid, finding minor differences in their usage. For example, Ovid tends frequently to put alliterating words in the first half of the verse, while Virgil is more likely to put them in the second half. In both poets, the most likely position for an alliterating word is after the 3rd-foot caesura, and the second most common the beginning of the verse. Often there is alliteration in both of these places at once, as in the following line of Ovid:

Vīpereās carnēs, Vitiōrum alimenta suōrum
"flesh of vipers, nutrition for her vices"

Greenberg (1980), who criticises Clarke's study as statistically unsound in some respects, compares Virgil and Lucretius. One of his conclusions is that Lucretius is more likely than Virgil to use three or more initially alliterating words in the same line, for example:

Multa Modīs Multīs variā ratiōne Movērī
"(we see) many things moving in many ways by various means"

In order to simplify their investigation, neither scholar takes internal alliteration into account, or alliterations such as incidit ictus ingēns which spread over more than one line. However, Greenberg states: "There is no intrinsic reason why alliteration should be limited to the confines of a single verse or to word-initials."

Certain letters are used in alliteration more frequently than others. In Virgil, according to Clarke, the commonest letters for word-initial alliteration are a, c, p, s, m, t, d, e, f, i, n, v; alliteration with b is very rare. However, when an alliterating word comes after a verse-break such as a caesura, the letter a is less common, coming only in 6th or 7th place.

Usually a letter alliterates only with itself, but sometimes qu can alliterate with c; ph may alliterate with p; ae and au may alliterate with a; and sc, sp, st may alliterate with s.

From both studies, it is clear that when only two words in a line begin with the same letter, it is difficult or impossible to identify objectively whether the alliteration is accidental or deliberate, since alliterated words occur no more often in any line than would be due to chance. To identify whether alliteration is present, more subjective criteria must be used, such as whether the two words are important for the meaning of the line. Thus although Lucretius 3.267 (et sapor et tamen) is counted as an example of alliteration by Greenberg's computer programme, it is doubtful if alliteration can be made on a weak word such as et "and".

When two pairs of words alliterate in the same line, the order abab is most common, then aabb, then abba. An example of the last is the following from Virgil:

Multā Vī Vulnera Miscent
"they exchange wounds with much violence"

Although alliteration is common in Virgil, Ovid, and Lucretius, it is not found in every line. Overall, some 35-40% of lines in both Virgil and Ovid have no word-initial alliteration at all; in many of the remainder, the alliteration may well be accidental.

== Uses of alliteration ==
=== Linking alliteration ===
Frequently alliteration simply adorns and beautifies a verse, without adding any particular emphasis. As Headlam (1920) notes, often the alliteration runs through a passage, linking together the various clauses, as in the opening of Aeneid 4, where the letters C, C, V, V, T, T recur repeatedly, as well as assonances such as vulnus / virtūs / multus / vultus, cūrā / carpitur / recursat, and gentis / haerent:

at RēGīna GRavī iamdūdum sauCia Cūrā
Vulnus alit Vēnīs et CaeCō Carpitur ignī.
Multa Virī Virtūs animō Multusque reCursat
gentis Honōs; Haerent īnfīxī Pectore Vultūs
Verbaque nec Placidam membrīs dat Cūra Quiētem.
"But the Queen, for a long time now wounded with serious passion,
feeds the wound in her veins and is tormented by unseen fire.
The man's courage keeps occurring to her mind,
and the nobility of his race; his face and words remain fixed in her heart
and her love gives no peaceful sleep to her limbs."

In his commentary on these lines, Ingo Gildenhard suggests that in the repeated alliteration with V in three pairs of words, Virgil seems to be hinting at a thematic link between the vulnus "wound" of Dido and the virtūs "manliness", vultūs "face", and verba "words" of Aeneas.

=== Synonyms and antonyms ===
Another use for alliteration is to link together synonyms or thematically similar words:

neque enim Levia aut Lūdicra petuntur
praemia, sed Turnī dē vītā et sanguine certant.
"For it is not unimportant or sporting prizes which are being competed for,
but they are fighting over the life and blood of Turnus."

Ventō hūc Vastīs et fluctibus ācti
"driven here by the wind and by huge waves"

ō GeRmāna mihī atque eadem GRātissima coniunx
"O my sister, who art also my most dear wife"

PeRGe modo, et, quā tē dūcit via, dīRiGe GRessum
"Be on your way, and direct your step wherever the road takes you."

In the following example, the great quantity of blood when the two bulls fight is emphasised by the alliteration on the words largō "copious" and lavant "they wash":

cornuaque obnīxī īnfīgunt et sanguine Largō
coll' armōsque Lavant, gemitū nemus omne remūgit
"Leaning they stab their horns and with copious blood
they wash their necks and shoulders, and the whole forest echoes with bellowing."

Alliteration can also be used in both prose and verse to emphasise an antithesis between two opposite things:

non tua Dicta ... Dī mē terrent
"it is not your words but the gods who terrify me"

=== Onomatopoeia ===
Frequently both Lucretius and Virgil use alliteration onomatopoeically to paint pictures in sound. Thus alliteration with S may represent the whooshing of an arrow or a spear, the sound of waves breaking on the rocks, or the hissing of serpents:

SauciuS at SerpēnS SinuoSa volumina verSat
arrectīSque horret SquāmīS et Sībilat ōre.
"But the wounded serpent writhes its sinuous coils
and bristles with raised scales and hisses with its mouth"

R, C, T, and S may call up "loud and violent sounds". In the following lines the alliteration is reinforced by assonance of or, or and to, to, tu, tu:

tum vērō exoritur clāmor Rīpaeque lacūsque
Respōnsant Circā et Caelum TonaT omne TumulTū.
"just then there arises a shout and the river banks and lakes
echo round about and the sky thunders with the tumult"

C, R, T imitate the crackling of flames in the following lines of Lucretius:

TeRRibilī soniTū flammā CRepiTanTe CRemāTur
"with a terrifying sound it burns up in a crackling flame"

C, N and T, as in cantus 'singing, music', can also imitate the sounds of musical instruments, as in these lines of Lucretius:

Tympana TenTa Tonant palmīs et Cymbala CirCum
ConCava, rauCisonōque minantur Cornua Cantū.
"Taut timbrels thunder in their hands, and hollow cymbals all around,
and horns menace with harsh-sounding bray"

In the opening of Virgil's first Eclogue, as in the line of Theocritus that it imitates, the T and P sounds have been explained as the whispering of the leaves of the tree:

TīTyre, Tū PaTulae recubāns sub Tegmine fāgī.
"Tityrus, you who are lying under the shade of a spreading beech tree."

In the following lines from Eclogue 5, on the other hand, S and R, as in the Latin word susurro 'I whisper' (used of the breeze in the poem Culex 154, or of bees in Georgics 4.260), represent the sound of the whispering of the wind or the rustling of leaves:

Sīve Sub incertās Zephyrīs mōtantibus umbrās
Sīve antrō potius Succēdimus. aspice, ut antrum
Silvestris Rārīs Sparsit labrusca Racēmīs.

"whether beneath the flickering shadows as the Zephyrs move them,
or whether rather we go up to the cave – look how the woodland vine
has sprinkled the cave with its scattered vine-fruits."

M and R, as in the word murmur 'murmuring, rumbling', may represent the rolling of thunder or the roaring of the sea:

intereā Magnō Miscērī Murmure pontum
"meanwhile the sea began to stir with a loud roaring"

With the letters P and D Virgil can represent the sound of men running:

trePiDīque PeDem PeDe ferviDus urget
"he presses hotly with his foot the foot of the panicking Turnus"

The alternation of T Q C and G combined with a dactylic rhythm can imitate the takkatak takkatak sound of a horse cantering across the plain:

porTaT eQuus CrisTāQue TeGiT Galea auRea RubRā
"his horse carries him and a golden helmet with a red crest covers his head"

The letter H, which is only rarely used, can imitate the panting of a dog:

at vīvidus Umber Haeret Hiāns
"but the lively Umbrian dog sticks to it panting"

In this line, describing the fate of some Lycian peasants who have been transformed into frogs, Ovid uses the alliteration (with assonance) of QUA QUA to represent their quacking, even before revealing what creatures they have been metamorphosed into:

Quamvis sint sub aQuā, sub aQuā maledīcere temptant.
"Though they be under water, under water they still try to curse her."

In the following highly alliterative line it has been suggested that Ovid is imitating the chattering sound of the local Black Sea languages:

iam DiDiCī GeTiCē SarmaTiCēQue loQuī.
"By now I have learnt to speak in Getic and Sarmatic."

=== Light and liquid ===
As Bailey points out often a key word will set the alliteration in a line. Thus murmur "rumbling" will suggest the letters M and R, ventus "wind" and vīs "force" will suggest V, and the letter L, the initial of lūx and lūmen (both meaning "light"), may represent the effects of light:

Adspirant Aurae in Noctem Nec Candida Cursūs
Lūna Negat; spLendet tremuLō sub Lūmine pontus.
"The breezes breathe into the night; nor does the bright moon deny their passage;
the sea glistens beneath its trembling light."

Likewise in the following lines from book 2 of the Aeneid the L, C, and ŪC sounds of the word lūce "light" are picked out and repeated:

intonuit Laevum, et dē CaeLō Lāpsa per umbrās
steLLa faCem dŪCens multā Cum LŪCe CuCurrit.
"There was thunder on the left, and from the sky gliding through the darkness
a star, drawing a trail, ran with much light."

L can also suggest the gliding of liquid, as at Lucretius 5.950, where there is secondary alliteration of R:

quibus ē scībant ūmōre fLuenta
Lūbrica prōLuviē Largā Lavere ūmida saxa
"from whom slippery streams flowing with moisture were learning how to wash the wet rocks with plentiful overflow"

Both ideas are combined in the following lines, also from Lucretius:

Largus item Liquidī fōns Lūminis, aetherius sōL,
inRigat adsiduē CaeLum CandōRe Recentī
"Likewise, a plentiful spring of liquid light, the etherial sun,
constantly irrigates the sky with fresh brightness."

=== Echo alliteration ===
Another use of alliteration in Virgil is to emphasise particular key words or names. Headlam (1921) demonstrates how when Virgil introduces a proper name he often uses echoes of the sound of that name through alliteration or assonance in nearby words, a technique he refers to as "echo alliteration":

et centumgeminus Briareus ac BēLua Lernae
"and hundred-handed Briareus and the beast of Lerna"

tālīs CĀSūs CASSandra Canēbat
"Cassandra used to sing of such events."

hūc, Pater ō LĒNaee — tuīs hīc omnia PLĒNa mūneribus
"Come hither, Father Lenaeus – here everything is filled with your gifts."

PRiAMō ... PeRgAMa
"Priam ... Pergama".

Not only proper names but also other key words can be highlighted in this way. In the passage below, the god Faunus and the wild olive tree (oleaster) both play a significant role in the story. The first of these is highlighted by the alliteration F F F; the second by assonance (-oliis oleas-). There are further echoes in the syllables ste, ter, ol and le in the second line:

Forte sacer Faunō, Foliīs oleaster amārīs
hīc steterat, nautīs ōlim venerābile lignum.
"By chance, sacred to Faunus, a wild olive with bitter leaves
had stood here, a piece of wood once venerable for sailors."

=== Dramatic moments ===
Alliteration is frequently used in the Aeneid at moments of high drama, such as the moment that Aeneas's enemy Turnus is finally struck down by Aeneas in book 12. In this passage can be heard first the noisy STR STR imitating the sound of the spear's flight, then the vocalic alliteration of I I I as Turnus falls, and finally an assonance of PLI PLI as his knees buckle:

per medium STRīdēnS TRansit femur. Incidit Ictus
Ingens ad Terram duPLicāTō PoPLiTe Turnus.
"Whooshing, (the spear) passes through his thigh. The huge Turnus,
struck, falls to the ground with folded knee."

Another warrior dies in book 9 of the Aeneid as follows, with primary alliteration of V V, F F, and secondary alliteration of L L and NG NG:

Volvitur ille Vomēns calidum dē pectore Flūmen
Frīgidus et Longīs singultibus īlia pulsat.
"He rolls over, vomiting a hot stream from his chest,
and becoming cold shakes his flanks with long gulps."

Ovid also sometimes uses alliteration to mark significant moments in the story, as when he describes Echo's transformation. Here the alliteration of F F is accompanied by an assonance of OSS ISS:

vōx manet; oSSa Ferunt lapidis traxiSSe Figūram.
"Her voice remains, but they say her bones took on the appearance of a stone."

When Scylla silently enters her father's bedroom and cuts off the lock of hair whose loss will destroy the city, the letter T is constantly repeated, the word facinus "crime" and fātālī "fatal" are emphasised by alliteration of F, and intrat ... nāta parentem are linked by the assonance of NT. Finally alliteration of S emphasises the word spoliat "robs":

...Thalamōs TaciTurna paTernōs
inTraT eT (heu Facinus!) FāTālī nāTa parenTem
crīne Suum Spoliat...
"Silently she enters her father's bedroom
and (alas, dreadful deed!) the daughter robs the parent
of his fatal lock"

In the following lines Ovid describes the dangerous moment in the flight of Icarus when he flies too close to the sun. Here the consonants D and C of the word audācī "daring" are echoed through two lines, before giving way to T T T:

Cum puer auDāCī Coepit gauDēre volātū
DēseruitQue DuCem CaelīQue CupīDine TracTus
alTius ēgiT iTer.
"when the boy began to take pleasure in audacious flight
and abandoned his leader, and drawn by desire for the sky
flew on a higher path."

=== Emotional speech ===
Alliteration and assonance also often add emphasis to expressions of emotion, such as anger, scorn, grief, panic, and terror, as in the following lines from book 2 of the Aeneid, where the ghost of Hector orders Aeneas to flee. Here alliteration is combined with assonance of Priamō ... Pergama and possent ... fuissent:

Hostis Habet murōs! Ruit altō ā culmine Troia.
sat Patriae Priamōque Datum: sī Pergama Dextrā
Dēfendī Possent, etiam hāc Dēfēnsa fuissent.
"The enemy holds the walls! Troy is falling from its high rooftops.
Enough has been given to out fatherland and to Priam; if Pergama were able to be defended
by a right hand, it would have been defended even by this one!"

In book 12 of the Aeneid Turnus's sister cries these words, alternating the M and T of metus and timor (both words meaning "fear"), and combining it with assonance of ē and em:

nē Mē TerrēTe TiMenTem!
"Do not terrify me, who am already scared!"

Aeneas taunts his enemy with alliteration of T C S and assonance of VER VA VAR VA AR A as follows:

Verte omnīs Tētē in faciēs et Contrahe quidquid
sīv Animīs sīv Arte Valēs; opt Ardua pennīs
AStra Sequī ClauSumque Cavā Tē Condere Terrā.
"Turn yourself into any shape and draw together whatever
you can in courage or skill; choose to fly on wings into the stars on high
or bury yourself enclosed in the hollow earth!"

In his reply, Turnus combines alliteration of T F D with assonance of FER TER FER TER:

ille caput quassāns: ‘nōn mē Tua Fervida Terrent
Dicta, Ferōx; Dī mē Terrent et Iuppiter hostis.'
"Shaking his head, he replied, 'It is not your hot words that terrify me,
fierce though you are; it is the gods who terrify me, and Jupiter my enemy!"

== Decline of alliteration ==
Tastes in alliteration gradually changed, and some writers, such as Plautus, Ennius, Lucretius, and Virgil, used it much more freely than others such as Catullus or Horace. From the first century AD it became less common. The scholar Servius (c.400), who wrote a commentary on Virgil, commented on the triple alliteration of Aeneid 3.183 (cāsūs Cassandra canēbat "Cassandra used to sing of these events") and similar phrases: "This style of composition is now considered a fault, although our ancestors liked it". He also disapproved of phrases such as Dōrica castra (Aeneid 2.27) in which the final syllable of a word was repeated in the next word.

A few years later Martianus Capella (fl. 410–20) wrote: Compositiōnis vitium maximum est nōn vītāre cuiuslibet litterae assiduitātem in odium repetītam. "It is a very great fault in composition not to avoid the constant use of a letter repeated ad nauseam."

== Alliteration in Anglo-Latin poetry ==
From the 7th century onwards English scholars began writing poetry in Latin, beginning with Aldhelm, Abbot of Malmesbury in Wiltshire. Imitating and perhaps even exceeding the type of alliteration familiar in Old English, poems were written such as the following, attributed to Aldhelm himself, which displays both major and minor alliteration:

Turbō Terram Teretibus
Grassābātur Grandinibus
quae Catervātim Caelitus
Crebrantur Nigrīs Nūbibus
"A whirlwind was coming over the land
with smooth hailstones,
which in throngs from the sky
are sieved by the black clouds."

Aldhelm also used alliteration in many of his hexameter lines, such as the following:

Lūstrat dum Terrās obLīquō Trāmite Tītan
"while Titan (= the sun) traverses the lands with his slanting beam"

Lapidge (1979) discusses where exactly alliteration should be sought: at the beginning of the word, on the stressed syllable, or on the verse ictus. However, these questions still remain largely unanswered.

Another highly alliterative work produced in England is the Melos Amoris ("Melody of Love") written about 1330 by the Yorkshire mystic Richard Rolle. An excerpt of this work, which is written in prose, but with some characteristics of verse, is the following:

Amīcam Autem Adamāvī, in quam Angelī
Omnipotentis Anhēlant Aspicere.
et Mīrificam Mariam Misericordiē Mātrem
Mulcēbam Michi in Mollitiē Mellifluā.
"But I fell in love with a Beloved, on whom the Angels
of the Omnipotent pant to gaze.
And Mary, the miraculous mother of mercy,
I was caressing to myself in honey-flowing softness."

The same author's Canticum Amōris is a shorter poem written in alliterative verse. At about the same time as Richard Rolle wrote this, an Alliterative Revival also began in English poetry, and in the same part of England.

== Bibliography ==
- Austin, R.G. (1970), "Assonance, Latin", in The Oxford Classical Dictionary 2nd edition, pp. 132–3.
- Bailey, Cyril (1947), Titi Lucreti Cari De Rerum Natura Libri Sex, Oxford; vol 1, pp. 146–153.
- Clarke, W.M. (1976), "Intentional Alliteration in Vergil and Ovid". Latomus, 35, 2, pp. 276–300.
- de Ford, Sara (1986). "The Use and Function of Alliteration in the Melos Amoris of Richard Rolle". Mystics Quarterly, Vol. 12, No. 2 (June 1986), pp. 59–66.
- Deutsch, Rosamund E. (1939), The Pattern of Sound in Lucretius. Reviewed by Cyril Bailey in Classical Review liii (1939), p. 188.
- Greenberg, Nathan A. (1980), "Aspects of Alliteration: A Statistical Study". Latomus, 39, 3, pp. 585–611.
- Headlam, C.E.S. (1920) "The Art of Virgil's Poetry". The Classical Review Vol. 34, No. 1/2, pp. 23–26.
- Headlam, C.E.S. (1921) "The Technique of Virgil's Verse". The Classical Review Vol. 35, No. 3/4, pp. 61–64.
- Holzberg, Niklas (2009) Quamvis sint sub aqua, sub aqua maledicere temptant: Wann sind Übersetzer lateinischer Poesie mit ihrem Latein am Ende?.
- Kenney, E. J. (2002). "Ovid's language and style". In Brill's Companion to Ovid (pp. 27–89). Brill.
- Lapidge, Michael (1979) "Aldhelm's Latin Poetry and Old English Verse". Comparative Literature, Vol. 31, No. 3 (Summer, 1979), pp. 209–231.
- Liegey, G.M. (1956), "The 'Canticum Amoris' of Richard Rolle". Traditio Vol. 12 (1956), pp. 369–391.
- Lindsay, W.M. (1893) "The Saturnian Metre. First Paper." American Journal of Philology 14.2: 139–170.
- McGann, M.J. (1958). "Initial Stress and the Latin "Carmen"". Glotta 37. Bd., 3./4, pp. 293–305.
- Naeke, August F. (1829), "De allitteratione sermonis Latini". Rheinisches Museum für Philologie, Geschichte und griechische Philosophie 3, pp. 324–418.
- Peck, Tracy (1884), "Alliteration in Latin". Transactions of the American Philological Association (1869–1896) Vol. 15, pp. 58–65.
- Pontano, Giovanni Gioviano (1507), Actius de numeris poeticis & lege historiæ (ed. princeps).
- Rolfe, J.C. (1943), "Review of A. Cordier (1939), L'allitération Latine, le procédé dans l'Énéide de Virgile". The American Journal of Philology, Vol. 64, No. 2, pp. 226–238.
- Thoma, Mary R. (1949) "The Alliterations in Virgil's Aeneid with Special Reference to Books I-VI". Master's Theses. Paper 701.

== See also ==
- Alliterative Revival
- Literary consonance
- Cynghanedd
