= Teige Mac Con Midhe =

Irish poet and historian (died 1493)

Teige Mac Con Midhe, Irish poet and writer, died in 1493.

Mac Con Midhe was a member of an Irish brehon family. According to the Annals of the Four Masters:

- M1493.17 Mac Namee, i.e. Teige, the son of Conor Roe, son of Eachmarcach, an eminent poet and a good scholar, was slain by a labourer, one of his own people. i.e. the son of O'Clumhain.

== See also ==
- Giolla Brighde Mac Con Midhe (fl. 1210?–1272?)
- Brian Mac Con Midhe, chief poet to Turlough Luineach O'Neill
- Cormac Mac Con Midhe (d.1627
