= Karl Friedrich Heinrich =

German classical philologist (1774–1838)

Karl Friedrich Heinrich (8 February 1774, in Molschleben – 20 February 1838, in Bonn) was a German classical philologist.

He studied under Christian Friedrich Wilhelm Jacobs and Johann Kaspar Friedrich Manso at the gymnasium in Gotha. From 1791 he studied theology at the University of Göttingen, where under the influence of Christian Gottlob Heyne, he changed his focus to philology. In 1804 he became a professor of Greek literature at the University of Kiel, then in 1818 relocated to the University of Bonn as a professor of classical philology. At Bonn, he served as director of the philological seminar.

== Published works ==
- Erklärende Anmerkungen zum Homer (6 volumes, 1792–1818) by Johann Heinrich Justus Köppen, produced by Johann Christian Heinrich Krause, edited by Karl Friedrich Heinrich.
- Musaei de Herone et Leandro carmen (edition of Musaeus, 1793).
- Epimenides aus Kreta. Eine kritisch-historische Zusammenstellung aus Bruchstücken des Alterthums (1801) – Epimenides of Crete, a critical-historical compilation of ancient fragments.
- Hesiodi Scutum Herculis. Cum grammaticorum scholiis graecis (edition of Hesiod, 1802).
- Commentatio I. in D. Jun. Juvenalis Satiras (On Juvenal's Satires; 1896).
- M. Tulli Ciceronis Orationum pro Scauro, pro Tullio, pro Flacco partes ineditae (edition of Cicero, 1816), with Andreas Wilhelm Cramer and Angelo Mai.
- M. Tulli Ciceronis De re publica librorum sex quae supersunt (edition of Cicero, 1823).
- D. Iunii Iuvenalis Satirae cum commentariis (edition of Juvenal; 2 volumes, 1839); with Ludwig Schopen.
- Des Aulus Persius-Flaccus Satiren (edition of Persius, 1844).
