= Eoin Ó Gnímh =

Irish poet and manuscript collector

Eoin Ó Gnímh was an Irish poet and manuscript collector, fl. December 1699.

Ó Gnímh was a member of a hereditary learned family based at Larne, County Antrim, who had been bard for the O'Neills.

He was responsible for preserving a number of manuscripts compiled or collected by Dubhaltach Mac Fhirbhisigh.

== See also ==
- Fear Flatha Ó Gnímh
