= Ó Gnímh =

Notable Irish surname now rendered as Agnew

Ó Gnímh was the surname of an Irish brehon family. Brian Ó Cuív and Hector McDonnell argue that Fear Flatha Ó Gnímh descends from Alasdair, a great grandson of Somhairle/Somerled.

The Ó Gnímh family were based at Larne, County Antrim, and were hereditary poets for the O’Neills and MacDonalds.

The surname is anglicized as Agnew where the Clan Agnew in Galloway may have a common ancestor with Fear Flatha Ó Gnímh.

Notable people with the surname include:

- Eoin Ó Gnímh (fl. 1699), Irish poet and manuscript collector
- Fear Flatha Ó Gnímh (c. 1570–c. 1645), Irish poet
- Brían Ó Gnímh (fl. 1580), Irish poet
- Padraig O Gnímh (fl 1640s), Irish poet.
