= Parechesis =

Type of linguistic repetition

In rhetoric, parechesis (παρήχησις) is the repetition of the same sound in several words in close succession.

An example of a parechesis is: "He persuades the Pithian (πείθει τὸν Πειθίαν)." Hermogenes of Tarsus discusses parechesis in his work On the invention of arguments (Περὶ εὑρέσεως). Alliteration (initial rhyme) is a special case of parechesis.

It is related to paronomasia.

== Literature ==
- Smyth, Herbert Weir (1920). Greek Grammar. Cambridge MA: Harvard University Press. pp. 680–681. ISBN 0-674-36250-0.
