= Cóir Connacht ar chath Laighean =

14th century Irish poem

Cóir Connacht ar chath Laighean ("Justice of Connacht on the battle of Leinster") is a fourteenth-century Irish poem.

It is an address to Aedh Ó Conchobair, King of Connacht (d. 1309) and is thought to be "the earliest extant bardic poem containing an 'arming the hero' sequence with reference to the new Norman style of arms".

It is of a piece with An sluagh sidhe so i nEamhuin?, composed nearly four hundred years later.
