= Ludwig Schopen =

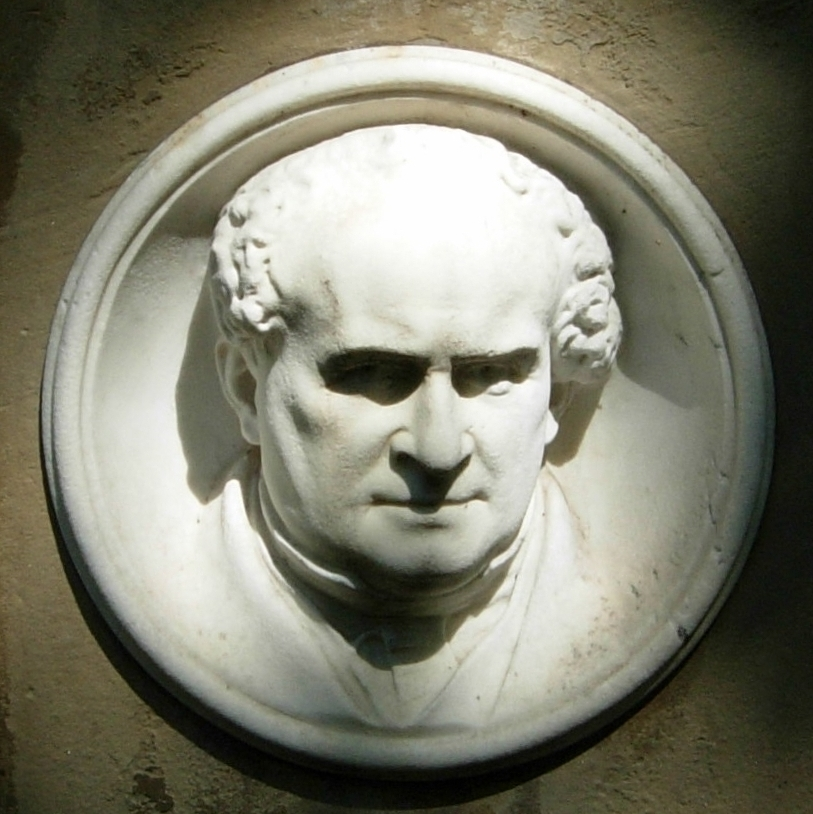
Grave medallion of Schopen at the Alter Friedhof, Bonn, by Robert Cauer the Elder.

Ludwig Schopen (17 October 1799, in Düsseldorf – 22 November 1867, in Bonn) was a German classical philologist and Byzantinist.

== Biography ==
As a gymnasium student in his hometown of Düsseldorf, he was encouraged by Karl Wilhelm Kortüm and Friedrich Kohlrausch to study history and philology. He studied at the University of Heidelberg as a pupil of Friedrich Creuzer, and in 1818 transferred to the newly-founded University of Bonn. Subsequently, he became a disciple of philologist Karl Friedrich Heinrich at Bonn, where in 1821 he received the first doctorate awarded by the faculty of philosophy.

After graduation, he worked as a gymnasium teacher in Bonn, and in the meantime, pursued philological and historical research. He worked closely with Bonn professor Barthold Georg Niebuhr, and focused his attention on Byzantine studies, publishing critical editions on the writings of John Kantakouzenos (3 volumes, 1828–32) and Nicephorus Gregoras (2 volumes, 1829–30) as a result. With support from Friedrich Ritschl, he was named an associate professor at the university in 1840, attaining a full professorship of philology in 1844. In 1847 he was appointed director of the Bonn gymnasium.

== Selected works ==
- De Terentio et Donato eius interprete dissertatio critica (dissertation, 1821).
- Ioannis Cantacuzeni eximperatoris historiarum libri IV. Graece et Latine (3 volumes, 1828–32) – edition of John Kantakouzenos.
- Nicephori Gregorae Byzantina historia Graece et Latine (2 volumes, 1829–30) – edition of Nicephorus Gregoras.
- Kritische Beiträge zu Fronto, 1830 – Critical reviews of Marcus Cornelius Fronto.
- Unedirte Scholien zur Terenz, 1832 – Unedited scholia of Terence.
- Annae Comnenae Alexiadis libri XV; (2 volumes 1839–78, 2nd volume edited by August Reifferscheid) – an edition of Anna Komnene's Alexiad, Book XV.
- Unedirte Scholien zu Juvenal’s III. Satire, 1847 – Unedited scholia of Juvenal's Satires, Book III.
- Carmina Valerii Catonis cum A. F. Naekii annotationibus; (1847, posthumous release of August Ferdinand Naeke's edition of Valerius Cato).
