= Tinnakill Duanaire =

Seventeenth-century manuscript

The Tinnakill Duanaire (Trinity College Dublin MS 1340) is an early seventeenth-century manuscript "prized for its important collection of bardic religious verse". It is believed to have been compiled for Aodh Buidhe Mac Domhnaill (1546–1619) of Tinnakill, County Laois, Leinster, who is the subject of one of its poems, along with his brother, Alasdar (d. 1577). The poem concerning Aodh Buidhe — "Le dís cuirthear clú Laighean" — is thought to have been composed about 1570 by Muircheartach Ó Cobhthaigh.
