= Fear Flatha Ó Gnímh =

Irish Poet

Fear Flatha Ó Gnímh (c. 1570 – c. 1645) was an Irish poet.

== Life and Family ==
Fear Flatha Ó Gnímh was a member of a hereditary learned family based in Larne, County Antrim. He was bard and juror for the MacDonnells of Antrim and O'Neills of Clannaboy.

The first mention of his name on a pardon list in 1586, featuring alongside followers of MacDonnell. If this reference can be attributed to the poet, he would have been born before 1580, the date recorded for his birth in some sources. The Anglicised variants of Ó Gnímh include O'Gnive, Ogneeve, Ogneiff and Agnew. Fear Flatha translated his name into English as O Gniuu.

== Brían Ó Gnímh ==
Fear Flatha was the son of poet Brían Ó Gnímh, who was patronised by the Antrim MacDonnells, but he is also known to have composed at least one poem for the O’Neills of Clandeboy. A 1570s poem by Brían alludes to Latharna (Larne) as a homeland. A number of Agnew families in the Kilwaughter Parish, adjacent to Larne, were granted land by Randal MacDonnell in the early 1600s.

Brían and Fear Flatha both featured on the 1602 list of pardons for loyal service to the crown under Randal MacDonnell, 1st Earl of Antrim. Brían, who also wrote prose, may have been the juror Brían Ó' Gnive listed in Inquisition documents of 1603 and 1605.

Poems by Brían on the Bardic Poetry Database are:

1. Mionn sul Eirionn i nAth Cliath
2. Na Bhrian tainig Aodh Eanghach

== Kilwaughter ==
The fact that a townland with bardic connotations — Lisnadrumbard — was recorded in Kilwaughter parish in the mid-1600s (among many neighbouring Agnew families) has led to the idea that this was the homeland of the bards.

The Agnew sheriffs of Scotland were also granted land in the same area of Larne and Kilwaughter. They are thought to have established Kilwaughter Castle in 1622. (The castle had the crest of the Lochnaw family above its door in the early 1800s). Several writers (listed in the scholarly articles below) have tried to establish if the Scottish and Irish Agnew families of Larne and Kilwaughter were related.

== Genealogy ==
Available genealogical records of the Ó Gnímh family attest to descent via Somerled of the Isles of Scotland through the MacDonnell clan, thus pointing to Scottish Gaelic ancestry. Hector MacDonnell makes one correction to the family tree thought to be written by Fear Flatha, introducing the idea of descent from Godfrey.

A simplified genealogical estimate of the male‑line ancestry of the family, based on a generational gap of 25 years, is as follows: Fear Flatha [born c. 1570], son of Brían [born c. 1545], son of An Fear Doirche [born c. 1520], son of Seaán [born c. 1495], son of Cormac [born c. 1470], son of Maol Mitnigh Óg [born c. 1445], son of Maol Mithigh Mór [born c. 1420], son of Gille Pádraig [born c. 1395], son of Séann of Dun Fiodháin [born c. 1370], son of Maol Muire [born c. 1345], son of Eóin Gníomh [Progenitor, born c. 1320], son of Gofraidh [born c. 1295], son of Alastair, son of Domhnall, son of Ragnall.

Hector McDonnell's theory would suggest the eponymous Ó Gnímh was a ‘Gallowglass’, an elite, hereditary mercenary soldier who served in Ireland.

== Poetry of Fear Flatha Ó Gnímh ==
Among Fear Flatha's best known poems is "A Niocláis, nocht an gcláirsigh!". His surviving poems include:

- A Niocláis, nocht an gcláirsigh!
- Beannacht ar anmain Éireann
- Cuimseach sin, a Fhearghail Óig
- Éireannaigh féin fionnLochlannaigh
- Mairg do-chuaidh re ceird ndúthchais
- Tairnig éigse fhuinn Gaoidheal
- Buaidhreadh cóighidh caoi Eanmhná
- Mo-ghéanar cheanglas cumann bainríoghna

Thomas Kinsella stated that: "His poetry, with its close-down of all positive feeling, dates ... to the time of confiscations and plantations in the early seventeenth century". Two of Ó Gnímh's poems, After the Flight of the Earls and The Passing of the Poets, are featured on pages 162–164 of The New Oxford Book of Irish Verse, published in 1986.

A later member of the family, Eoin Ó Gnímh (fl. December 1699), preserved a number of manuscripts compiled or collected by Dubhaltach Mac Fhirbhisigh.

Eoin Ó'Gnímh lived in Larne and sold some family manuscripts to Edward Llyud in 1700. These manuscripts can be found at Trinity College.

== Bardic Poetry Database ==
Poems by Fear Flatha on the Bardic Poetry Database are:

1. A lámh dar bhean an béim súl
2. A Nioclais nocht an chlairseach
3. A Thoirdhealbhaigh, turn th’aigneadh
4. Beannacht ar anmain Eireann
5. Buaidhreadh coigidh caoi en-mhna
6. Cia as mo comaoin ar chloinn Neill
7. Cia na cinn-seo do-chiu a-niar
8. Eireannaigh fein Fionnlochlannaigh
9. Gearr bhur ccuairt a chlann Neill
10. Mairg do chuaidh re ceird nduthchais
11. Mna tar muir maith re Gaoidhil
12. Mo thruaighe mar taid Gaodhail
13. Mogheanar cheanglas cumann bainrioghna
14. Na maith duinn t’fhiach a Enri
15. Nell longphuirt os Loch Eachach
16. Ni hainimh oige i bhflaithibh
17. Tairnig eigse fhuinn Ghaoidheal
18. Tiar tainig tus na seanma

Eoín (also Eoghan) has one poem on the Bardic Poetry Database:

1. Fogas fortuin don oige

Another poet Padraig Ó Gnímh, wrote:

1. An cumhall ceadna ag cloinn Eoghain
2. Cia na cinn-seo do-chiu a-niar

== Articles ==
Barbara Agnew Miers, ‘The Agnews of Kilwaughter: O’Gneeve vs Lochnaw Agnews’, Familia, 38 (2022), 32-58.

Caoimhín Breatnach, ‘The Early Modern Version of ‘Scéla Mucce Meic Da Thó: Tempus, Locus, Persona et Causa Scribendi’’, Ériu, 41 (1990), 37-60.

Caoimhín Breatnach, ‘Modern Irish Prose Reconsidered: The Case of Ceasacht Inguine Guile’, Ériu, 42 (1990), 119-138.

B. Cunningham and R. Gillespie, ‘The East Ulster Bardic Family of Ó Gnímh,’ Eígse, 20 (1984), 106-114.

A.J. Hughes, ‘An Dream Gaoidhealta Gallda: East Ulster poets and patrons as Gaelic Irish and English Crown personae.’ Études Celtiques, 34 (1998), 233-264. A.J. Hughes, ‘Land Acquisition by Gaelic Bardic Poets: Insights from Place-names and Other sources’, AINM: A Journal of Name Studies, 6 (1994), 74-102.

Angeline King, 'The Agnews of Kilwaughter: hereditary sheriffs, hereditary bards', Familia: Ulster Genealogical Review, 39 (2023), 131–151.

Hector McDonnell, ‘Agnews and O’Gnímhs’, The Glynns: Journal of The Glens of Antrim Historical Society, 21 (1993), 13-53

Brian Ó Cuív, ‘The Family of Ó Gnímh in Ireland and Scotland: A look at the sources,’ Nomina, 8 (1984), 57-71

Brian Ó Cuív, ‘Some Irish items relating to the MacDonnells of Antrim’, Celtica, 16 (1984), 139–156.

Katharine Simms, Gaelic Ulster in the Middle Ages (Dublin: Four Courts Press, 2020); Katharine Simms, ‘The Poetic Lawyers of Early Sixteenth-Century Ireland,’ Ériu, 57 (2007), 121-132 <http://www.jstor.org/stable/20696354> [

Douglas Shawbridge, The Agnews of the Braid and Glens (Self-published: Printed by Amazon, 2022).

== See also ==
- Eochaidh Ó hÉoghusa
- Mathghamhain Ó hIfearnáin
