= Literary consonance =

Form of rhyme involving matched consonants

Consonance is a form of rhyme involving the repetition of identical or similar consonants in neighboring words whose vowel sounds differ (e.g., coming/home, hot/foot, march/lurch). Consonance may be regarded as the counterpart to the vowel-sound repetition known as assonance.

In poetry, consonance can be used as an internal sound effect, for example, "The curfew tolls the knell of parting day", from Thomas Gray's "Elegy Written in a Country Churchyard". In rhyming technique, consonance is an element of imperfect rhyme or half rhyme, also called "slant rhyme", "near-rhyme" or "off-rhyme", in which "the final consonants in the stressed syllables agree but the vowels that precede them differ, as in 'add-read', 'bill-ball', and 'born-burn'."

Whereas consonance can repeat a consonant sound at any location in two or more stressed syllables, alliteration is a special case where the repeated consonants must occur at the beginning of words, as in "few flocked to the fight" or "around the rugged rock the ragged rascal ran". "Consonantal alliteration" is usually distinguished from other types of consonance and has different effects, for instance, it can increase the memorability of a passage and is often employed in slogans.

Another specialized type of consonance is sibilance, the repetition of hissing sibilant sounds such as /s/ and /ʃ/, as shown in the following line from Edgar Allan Poe's poem "The Raven": "And the silken sad uncertain rustling of each purple curtain." (This example also contains assonance around the "ur" sound.) The word "sibilance" itself illustrates consonance.

== Examples ==
In this stanza from Emily Dickinson's poem "As Imperceptibly As Grief",

A quietness distilled,
As twilight long begun,
Or Nature, spending with herself
Sequestered afternoon,

the linking of "begun" and "afternoon" utilizes consonance to create a slant rhyme or half rhyme. In its verb form, it is said that the words "begun" and "afternoon" consonate. Consonance rhyming, in a strict sense, pairs words where all consonants match, and only the vowel sound varies (e.g., fit/fat). Slant rhyming, by contrast, pairs words whose consonant sounds closely approximate one another (domestic/plastic, flex/fix, summer/somewhere, ruin/strewn), but still allow some differences.

Consonance appears frequently in hip-hop lyrics, for example, in the song Zealots by the Fugees: "Rap rejects my tape deck, ejects projectile/Whether Jew or gentile I rank top percentile." (This is also an example of internal rhyme.)

== See also ==
- Alliteration (Latin)
- Assonance
- Cynghanedd
- Figure of speech
- Rhyme scheme
- Rhyming
