= Mathghamhain Ó hIfearnáin =

16th-century Irish poet

Mathghamhain Ó hIfearnáin (Irish pronunciation: [ˈmˠahuːnʲ oː ˈhɪfʲəɾˠn̪ˠaːnʲ]; fl. 1585), was an early modern Irish poet.

Ó hIfearnáin was living in the Shronell district of County Tipperary in the late 16th century, and wrote poems on the decline of the profession of poetry. His best-known poem, Ceist! Cia do cheinneóchadh dán?, describes his journey across Munster in search of a buyer for a well-wrought poem. Another is A mhic, ná meabhraigh éigse.

== See also ==
- Fear Flatha Ó Gnímh
- Eochaidh Ó hÉoghusa
