= Leabhar Branach =

17th century Irish anthology

- Also known as: Book of the O'Byrnes
- Type: Compilation of Irish poetry
- Date: early 1600s
- Place of origin: County Wicklow
- Language: Early Modern Irish
- Dedicated to: O'Byrnes
- Condition: Original lost; 2 copies survive
- Script: Irish minuscule

The Leabhar Branach (Irish pronunciation: [ˌl̠ʲəuɾˠ ˈbˠɾˠanˠəx]), also called the [Poem] Book of the O'Byrnes is an Early Modern Irish anthology of poetry collected in the early 17th century. It consists of poetry in praise of the O'Byrne family, who ruled a region known as Gabhal Raghnaill in modern County Wicklow. The poems were written between roughly 1550 and 1630, a time of turmoil in Ireland that saw the Desmond Rebellions, Nine Years' War and O'Doherty's rebellion.

According to scholar Seán Mac Airt, who published a print version in 1944, "the Leabhar Branach, apart from its linguistic value, is important in that it affords us some insight from an Irish standpoint into the life and fortunes of a sept bordering the Pale, during an interesting if unhappy era of our history".

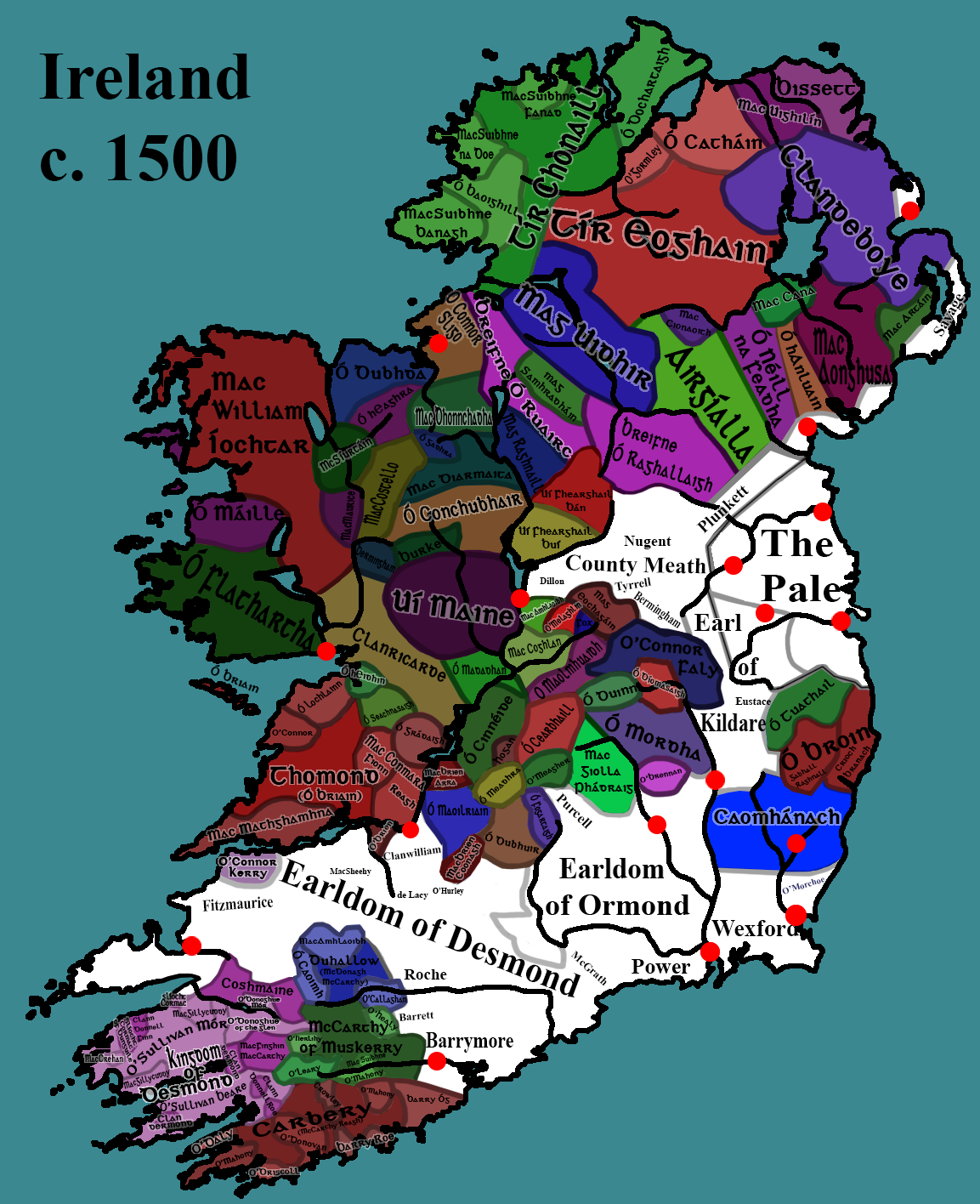
Ireland in 1500; the O'Byrne land is marked Ó Broin, in the east.

== Contents ==
The poems were mostly written by poets of the McKeogh (Mac Eochaidh, Mac Eochadha) family. Some are also by Eochaidh Ó hÉoghusa.

Several poems are dedicated to Fiach McHugh O'Byrne (1534–1597). His wife Rose O'Toole is described in one poem as "a blazing meteor, wine of grape, flower of women... She glows with the fire of youth. She is the life and death of heroes."

== Manuscripts ==
The original manuscripts of various poems were dedicated to four successive O'Byrne lords of Ranelagh, the last being Brian mac Phelim O'Byrne. In 1622, Brian likely commissioned Brian Mac Giolla Phádraig to transcribe them together into a single volume. His copy was in turn copied by Hugh O'Daly; this manuscript is in Trinity College, Dublin, while a copy made by Michael O'Byrne in the 1720s is in Houghton Library, Harvard University.
