= A theachtaire tig ón Róimh =

Poem potentially by Giolla Brighde Mac Con Midhe

A theachtaire tig ón Róimh ("Messenger, come from Rome") is a poem "somewhat doubtfully attributed to Giolla Brighde Mac Con Midhe"

The poem insists upon the need for genealogy to "preserve due class distinctions in Irish society, while the versifying of battle deeds guarantees immortal fame for the chieftains concerned."

== Extracts ==
- The suppression of encounters and battles of the men of Ireland would be a faulty matter:
- there would be no interest shown in prince nor noble descendants after their death, though their courage had been good ...
- If poems did not preserve all that they had done, even though they were noble heroes,
- there would long since have been a cloak of silence upon Niall, Conn and Cormac ...

(i.e., Niall Noígíallach, Conn Cétchathach and Cormac mac Art)

- Were it not for poetry, sweet-tongued harp of psaltery would not know of a goodly hero after his death
- nor of his reputation nor his prowess.
