= Royal Irish Academy, MS 24 P 33 =

Royal Irish Academy MS 24 P 33 is an Irish dunaire or 'poem-book' compiled by the scribe Ruaidhrí Ó hÚigínn, sometime in the late seventeenth century. It was made for the Clandeboy O'Neills. Alongside the poems are two prose historical tracts, dating from apparently the late sixteenth century; An Leabhar Eoghanach, and Ceart Uí Néill
