= Giolla Brighde Mac Con Midhe =

Irish poet

Giolla Brighde Mac Con Midhe, or Gilbride McNamee (c. 1210 – c. 1272) was an Irish poet.

== Background and family ==
Giolla Brighde Mac Con Midhe was hereditary Ollamh to the Cenél nEógain. The Ceart Uí Néill, a late medieval document dealing with the rights and territories of the Uí Néill in Ulster, places the Mac Con Midhe (MacNamee) family in the area of Ardstraw.

Prior to moving to Ardstraw, the Mac Con Midhes were known as Cinel Suibhne of Siol Ronain, the other half being Cinel Neachtain, the Ó Maolconaires, Ollamhs to the O'Connor Donn.

Siol Ronain were located in County Westmeath near the ancient capital established by Conn of the Hundred Battles at the Hill of Uisneach, and were closely associated with Clonmacnoise. In 911 with the midlands under tremendous pressure from the Vikings, the O'Maolchonaires were given land by the Ó Conchobhairs and crossed the Shannon into Roscommon, and the Mac Con Midhes headed North with the Ó Néills.

His mother was of the Cenél Conaill, so he addressed poems to the Ó Domhnaills as well as the Ó Néills. His closest patrons, however, were the Ó Gormlahaidhs of Ardstraw.

Mac Con Midhe married and had children, all of whom died at an early age. The childlessness of himself and his wife led him to compose Deán oram trócaire, a Thríonnóid, an anguished plea to God and the saints to grant them just one child.

There is speculation that there was another poet of the same name who lived earlier in the 13th century

== Compositions and fame ==
Diarmaid Ó Diobhlin (2000) has written of him as follows:

Giolla Brighde was highly regarded by his contemporaries and there are allusions to his poems in the works of later bards and in the bardic tracts ... Like much of the bardic poetry that has come down to us, Giolla Brighde's verse is stately, precise and controlled and clearly the product of a very sophisticated personality ...

He composed poems for several notable Irish kings and chieftains, including:

- King Domnall Mór of Tír Chonaill, died 1241
- Padraig Ua hAnluain of Airgíalla, died 1243
- King Áed of Connacht, died 1247
- Gofraid Ó Dómhnaill, died 1258
- Ó Gormshleaghaigh of Ardstraw
- Roalbh Mac Mathgamna of Airgíalla, fl. 1270
- King Domnall Óg of Tír Chonaill, died 1282

Besides panegyrics, he composed a number of religious verses. Outstanding among them is Deán oram trócaire, a Thríonnóid (Have mercy on me, O Trinity) in which he pleads for the Holy Trinity to grant him and his wife just one child, as all of their previous children have died.

A theachtaire tig ón Róimh (O messenger who comes from Rome), which defends poets and poetry against attacks by the church, is ascribed to him. However, there is some doubt that he was its author.

Giolla Brighde's death is mentioned in the poem Lenfat mo cheart ar Cloinn Dálaigh (I will claim my right from the sons of Dálach), which states King Domnall Og plundered the Ó Gormshleaghaighs while they were burying Giolla Brighide. When Domnaill Óg was told why they had not fought against him, he returned all that he had plundered as a mark of respect for the poet, who had addressed several poems to him.

His poems have been preserved in a wide variety of manuscripts from the 15th to the 19th centuries.

== Selected list of poems ==
- Deán oram trócaire, a Thríonnóid
- Aoidhe mo chroidhe ceann Briain (a lament for Brian Ó Néill, killed at the battle of Down in 1260.
- A-tá sunn seanchas Mu-áin
- A theachtaire thig ón Róimh
- Rogha na cloinne Conall

== See also ==
- Mac Con Midhe
- Cormac Mac Con Midhe
- Teige Mac Conmidhe
