= An sluagh sidhe so i nEamhuin? =

Irish poem

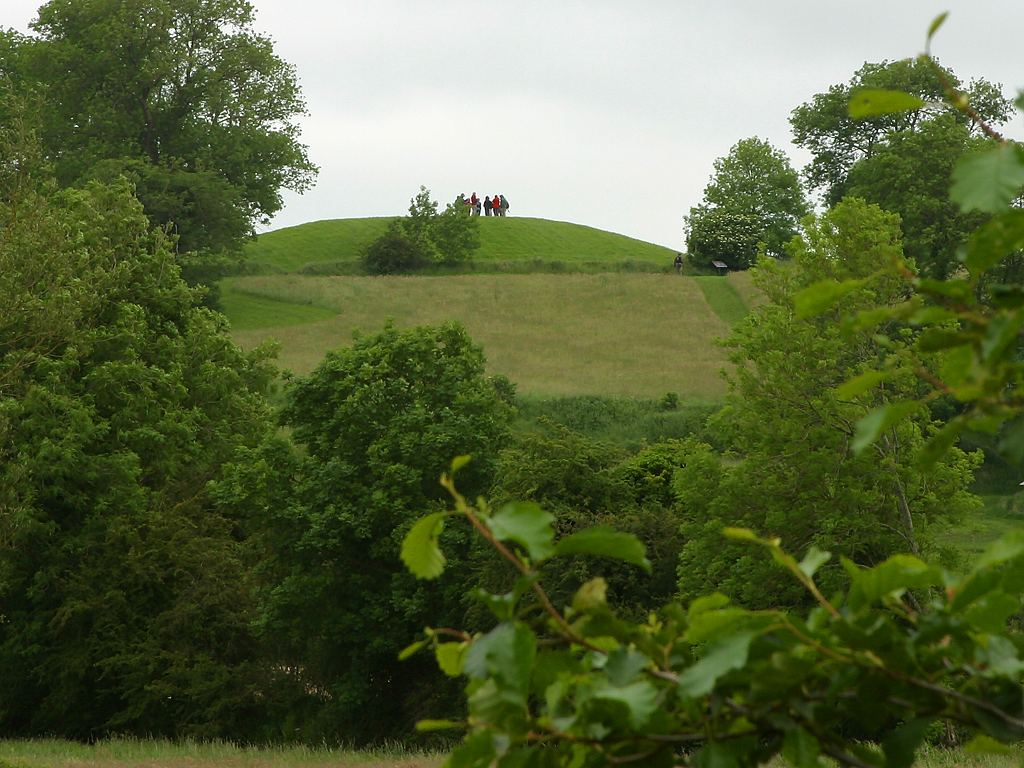
Navan Fort (Emain Macha)

An sluagh sidhe so i nEamhuin? (also known as Is this a fairy host in Navan Fort?) is an Irish poem dated to the late 16th century. The poem has been described as:

an ode to Turlough Luineach O'Neill which gives a great deal of information on the preparations for battle, despite almost nothing been said about the actual fight .. [It has] "the patron play[ing] the central role in a set piece on "Arming the Hero" which has parallels in all European literatures, and in Irish prose romances. This motif is a very old and well-established on - it is found repeatedly in Virgil's Aeneid. .... Many pieces in Turlough Luineach's accoutrement are ... described ... his spurs, his padded jack, his "feilm" or helmet.

== See also ==
- Cóir Connacht ar chath Laighean
