= August Ferdinand Naeke =

German classical philologist (1788–1838)

August Ferdinand Naeke (15 May 1788, in Frauenstein – 12 September 1838, in Bonn) was a German classical philologist.

He studied classical philology at the University of Leipzig as a pupil of Gottfried Hermann, receiving his doctorate in 1810. After graduation, he worked as a teacher at the Pädagogium of the Francke Foundations in Halle an der Saale. In 1817 he became an associate professor of classical philology, and during the following year, relocated to the University of Bonn, where in 1820 he obtained a full professorship. He is most famous today for having observed that in epic hexameters, it is rare to have a word end a spondaic fourth foot (unless this word is a proclitic that adheres closely to the word beginning the fifth foot, or the fifth foot begins with an enclitic). This is known as Naeke's Law, which he explained in "Callimachi Hecale," Rheinisches Museum 3 (1835) 509-68.

== Published works ==
He lectured on Greek and Latin playwrights and poets, especially Aeschylus, Aristophanes, Plautus, Catullus and Horace, and taught classes on the literary history of the Greeks and Romans, as well as on the metrics and poetics of the Romans. His best written effort was a monograph on the epic Greek poet Choerilus, titled Choerili Samii quae supersunt, collegit et illustravit (1817). The following is a list of his other published works:

- Schedae criticae de Pleiade Tragicorum graecorum (1812).
- De Battaro Valerii Catonis (1828); On Valerius Cato.
- De allitteratione sermonis Latini (1829), in Rheinisches Museum für Philologie, III, p. 324—418.
- Callimachi Hecale (On Callimachus; 6 parts, 1834–37) in: Rheinisches Museum für Philologie.
  - Published posthumously:
- Wallfahrt nach Sessenheim. Die ersten Nachforschungen über das Liebesidyll von Goethe und Friederike (1840) edited by Karl August Varnhagen von Ense – Pilgrimage to Sessenheim. The first research on the love idyll of Goethe and Friederike.
- Augusti Ferdinandi Naekii opuscula philologica (2 volumes, 1842–45) edited by Friedrich Gottlieb Welcker.
- Carmina Valerii Catonis cum A. F. Naekii annotationibus (1847) edited by Ludwig Schopen.
- August Ferdinand Näke über die thebanische Tetralogie des Aeschylus (1872) edited by Friedrich Ritschl – On the Theban triad of Aeschylus.

With Friedrich Gottlieb Welcker, he was editor of the journal Rheinisches Museum für Philologie.
