= Le dís cuirthear clú Laighean =

Poem in Irish

"Le dís cuirthear clú Laighean" is a poem found only in the Tinnakill Duanaire on folio 34r. It was composed for the brothers Aodh Buidhe Mac Domhnaill and Alasdar of Tinnakill, Queen's County, by Muircheartach Ó Cobhthaigh. It dates from about 1570.

In the poem, Ó Cobhthaigh refers to the brothers as heroes and Gallowglass leaders. Aodh Buidhe is accorded the most attention, while his wife Máire Ní Mhórdha is the subject of three additional quatrains.

Neither brother is referred to as Mac Domhnaill (i.e., the head of the clan), and Raghallaigh suggests it may have a bearing on a possible dispute between Aodh Buidhe and Alasdar for the chieftainship. While Aodh Buidhe is given laudatory praise, Alasdar is portrayed as a 'fearsome warrior' who is nevertheless subordinate to his brother. Nevertheless, Alasdar succeeded on the death of their father, An Calbach, in 1570. He held the position till his death in 1577, following which Aodh Buidhe succeeded him.

== The dunaire ==
A dunaire were poem-books composed in Gaelic Ireland, usually concerning members of a single family. The Tinnakill Dunaire is held in Dublin, where it is listed as Trinity College Dublin 1340. The likely patron was Aodh Buidhe himself.

== The poem ==
The first verse is quoted as follows; the translation is by Eoghan Ó Raghallaigh, cited below.

Le dís cuirthear clú Laighean;
clú 'na gcumaidh ní fog[h]ar;
ní t[h]éid barr dáibh nach dleag[h]ar;
mall treabhadh cáigh 'na gcom[h]ar.

The fame of the men of Leinster is spread by two men;
fame comparage with theirs is not to be found;
they are entitled to their pre-eminence;
others progress slowly in comparison with them'.
