= Sén dollotar Ulaid =

Irish poem

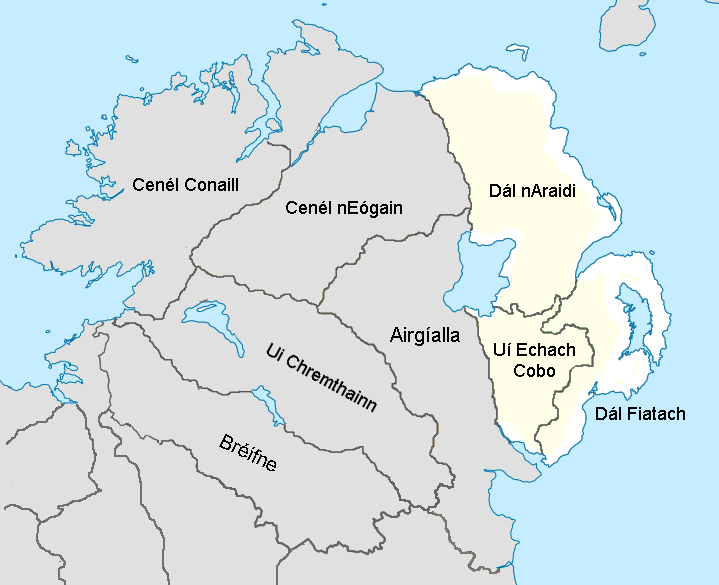
Ulaid during the 10th–11th century and its three main sub-kingdoms, along with some of its neighbouring kingdoms.

"Sén dollotar Ulaid ..." is an Irish poem of uncertain date, possibly early 10th-century. It consists of nine quatrains, and lacks context. It appears to concern a raid by the men of Ulaid (Ulster) to Viking Scotland.

== Text ==
- Sén dollotar Ulaid/i Lachlaind co leri/ co tuscat noí catha/on comainm coa celi. ...

== Translation ==
- Luckily came the Ulaid to Lochlann/expeditiously/and fought nine battles/from year's end to year's end. ...
