= Paidin mac Lochlainn Ó Mailchonaire =

Irish poet (died 1506)

- Died: 1506
- Writing career
- Genre: Poetry

Paidin mac Lochlainn Ó Mailchonaire was an Irish poet who died in 1506.

Ó Mailchonaire was a respected poet, and a member of the Ó Mailchonaire bardic family from Síol Muiredaigh (now central north County Roscommon).

The Annals of Ulster give his obituary as follows:

- Paidin Ua Mael-Conaire, unique choice of Ireland in poetry and in history, died of a fit, the night of Little Easter Monday.

The Annals of Lough Ce provide a little extra information:

- Páidín O'Maelchonaire, i.e. preceptor of the men of Erinn in poetry and history, died a sudden death this year—i.e. he lay down on his bed quite well, and was found dead in the morning.
