= Seaán Ó Clumháin =

Irish poet

- Writing career
- Genre: Poetry

Seaán Ó Clumháin, Irish poet, fl. c. 1450 - 1500.

Ó Clumháin was a Gaelic bard of a family of poets, originally from County Galway in Connacht. Early members of the family included Gilla Aenghus Ua Chlúmháin, ollamh of Connacht in poetry, who died in 1143, and his son, Aindileas Ua Chlúmháin, who died in 1170. By the 15th century, a branch of the family were house poets to O'Hara of County Sligo.

Only one surviving poem can now be attributed to him, Dorn idir dhán is dásacht, which consists of one hundred and eighty-eight lines. Places mentioned in it include Máenmag, Uisneach, Rathcrogan, Tara.

The Annals of the Four Masters, sub anno 1493, record that "Mac Namee, i.e. Teige, the son of Conor Roe, son of Eachmarcach, an eminent poet and a good scholar, was slain by a labourer, one of his own people. i.e. the son of O'Clumhain."
