= Is trúag in ces i mbiam =

Middle Irish poem

Is trúag in ces i mbiam ... is the first line and title of a poem which survives on two sixteenth-century vellum manuscripts, and one on paper from the second decade of the seventeenth. The poem probably dates from the earlier half of the Middle Irish period. It is in the metre called rannaigecht recomarcach, or rannaigecht bec.

== The poem (extracts) ==
Is trúag in ces i mbiam,
ní fes cía húair i mbaam;
dénam co-lléic ar figill
bés nach inill a-taam.

Wretched is the weak state in which we are,
it is not known when we may die;
meanwhile let us make our vigil
lest we be not prepared.
