= Muircheartach Ó Cobhthaigh =

Irish poet

Muircheartach Ó Cobhthaigh (IPA: [ˈmˠɪɾʲçaɾˠt̪ˠəx oː ˈkəuhiː]; fl. 1586) was an Irish poet, a member of the Ó Cobhthaigh clan of poets from County Westmeath. He is known as the author of six extant poems:

- Le dís cuirthear clú Laighean
- Dlighidh liaigh leigheas a charad, one hundred and forty verses, (edited by Lambert McKenna in 1949)
- Mairg as dáileamh don digh bhróin, on the death of Garret Nugent, Baron of Delvin (NLI MS G 992 (Nugent Manuscript) f.33v)
- Do-ní clú áit oighreachda one hundred and twenty-four verses on William Nugent (MS G 992, f.34v)
- Geall re hairlachd ainm barúin on the death of Christopher Nugent, 14th Baron Delvin (MS G 992, f. 35v)
- Séd fine teisd Thoirrdhealbhaigh (edited by Ó Cróinín)

Other poems by him may yet survive but cannot now be ascribed.
