= Assonance =

Repetition of vowel sounds to create internal rhyming

Assonance is the repetition of identical or similar phonemes in words or syllables that occur close together, either in terms of their vowel phonemes (e.g., lean green meat) or their consonant phonemes (e.g., Kip keeps capes). However, in American usage, assonance exclusively refers to this phenomenon when affecting vowels, whereas, when affecting consonants, it is generally called consonance. The two types are often combined, as between the words six and switch, which contain the same vowel and similar consonants. If there is repetition of the same vowel or some similar vowels in literary work, especially in stressed syllables, this may be termed "vowel harmony" in poetry (though linguists have a different definition of "vowel harmony").

A special case of assonance is rhyme, in which the endings of words (generally beginning with the vowel sound of the last stressed syllable) are identical—as in fog and log or history and mystery. Vocalic assonance is an important element in verse. Assonance occurs more often in verse than in prose; it is used in English-language poetry and is particularly important in Old French, Spanish, and the Celtic languages.

== Examples ==
English poetry is rich with examples of assonance and/or consonance:

That solitude which suits abstruser musings

— Samuel Taylor Coleridge, "Frost at Midnight"

on a proud round cloud in white high night

— e e cummings, if a cheerfulest Elephantangelchild should sit

His tender heir might bear his memory

— William Shakespeare, "Sonnet 1"

It also occurs in prose:

Soft language issued from their spitless lips as they swished in low circles round and round the field, winding hither and thither through the weeds.

— James Joyce, Portrait of the Artist as a Young Man

The Willow-Wren was twittering his thin little song, hidden himself in the dark selvedge of the river bank.

— Kenneth Grahame, The Wind in the Willows

Hip hop relies on assonance:

Some vodka that'll jumpstart my heart quicker than a shock when I get shocked at the hospital by the doctor when I'm not cooperating when I'm rocking the table when he's operating...

— Eminem, "Without Me"

Dead in the middle of little Italy little did we know that we riddled some middleman who didn't do diddly.

— Big Pun, "Twinz"

It is also heard in other forms of popular music:

I must confess that in my quest I felt depressed and restless

— Thin Lizzy, "With Love"

I never seen so many Dominican women with cinnamon tans

— Will Smith, "Miami"

Dot my I's with eyebrow pencils, close my eyelids, hide my eyes. I'll be idle in my ideals. Think of nothing else but I

— Keaton Henson, "Small Hands"

Assonance is common in proverbs:

The squeaky wheel gets the grease.

The early bird catches the worm.

Total assonance is found in a number of Pashto proverbs from Afghanistan:

- La zra na bal zra ta laar shta. "From one heart to another there is a way."
- Kha ghar lwar day pa sar laar lary. "Even if a mountain is very high, there is a path to the top."

This poetic device can be found in the first line of Homer's Iliad: Mênin áeide, theá, Pēlēïádeō Akhilêos (Μῆνιν ἄειδε, θεά, Πηληϊάδεω Ἀχιλῆος).

Odyssey 2.340 contains a notable example of assonance in three successive syllables: en de pithoi oinoio palaiou hedypotoio (ἐν δὲ πίθοι οἴνοιο παλαιοῦ ἡδυπότοιο).

Another example is Dies irae (probably by Thomas of Celano):

Dies iræ, dies illa
Solvet sæclum in favilla,
Teste David cum Sibylla.

In Dante's Divine Comedy there are some stanzas with such repetition.

così l’animo mio, ch’ancor fuggiva,
si volse a retro a rimirar lo passo
che non lasciò già mai persona viva.

In the following strophe from Hart Crane's "To Brooklyn Bridge" there is the vowel [i] in many stressed syllables.

How many dawns, chill from his rippling rest
The seagull’s wings shall dip and pivot him,
Shedding white rings of tumult, building high
Over the chained bay waters Liberty—

All rhymes in a strophe can be linked by vowel harmony into one assonance. Such stanzas can be found in Italian or Portuguese poetry, in works by Giambattista Marino and Luís Vaz de Camões:

Giunto a quel passo il giovinetto Alcide,
che fa capo al camin di nostra vita,
trovò dubbio e sospeso infra due guide
una via, che’ due strade era partita.
Facile e piana la sinistra ei vide,
di delizie e piacer tutta fiorita;
l’altra vestìa l’ispide balze alpine
di duri sassi e di pungenti spine.

This is ottava rima (abababcc), a very popular form in the Renaissance that was first used in epic poems.

As armas e os barões assinalados,
Que da ocidental praia Lusitana,
Por mares nunca de antes navegados,
Passaram ainda além da Taprobana,
Em perigos e guerras esforçados,
Mais do que prometia a força humana,
E entre gente remota edificaram
Novo Reino, que tanto sublimaram;

There are many examples of vowel harmony in French, Czech, and Polish poetry.

== See also ==
- Alliteration
- Literary consonance
