= Alliteration =

Repetition of consonant sounds in literature

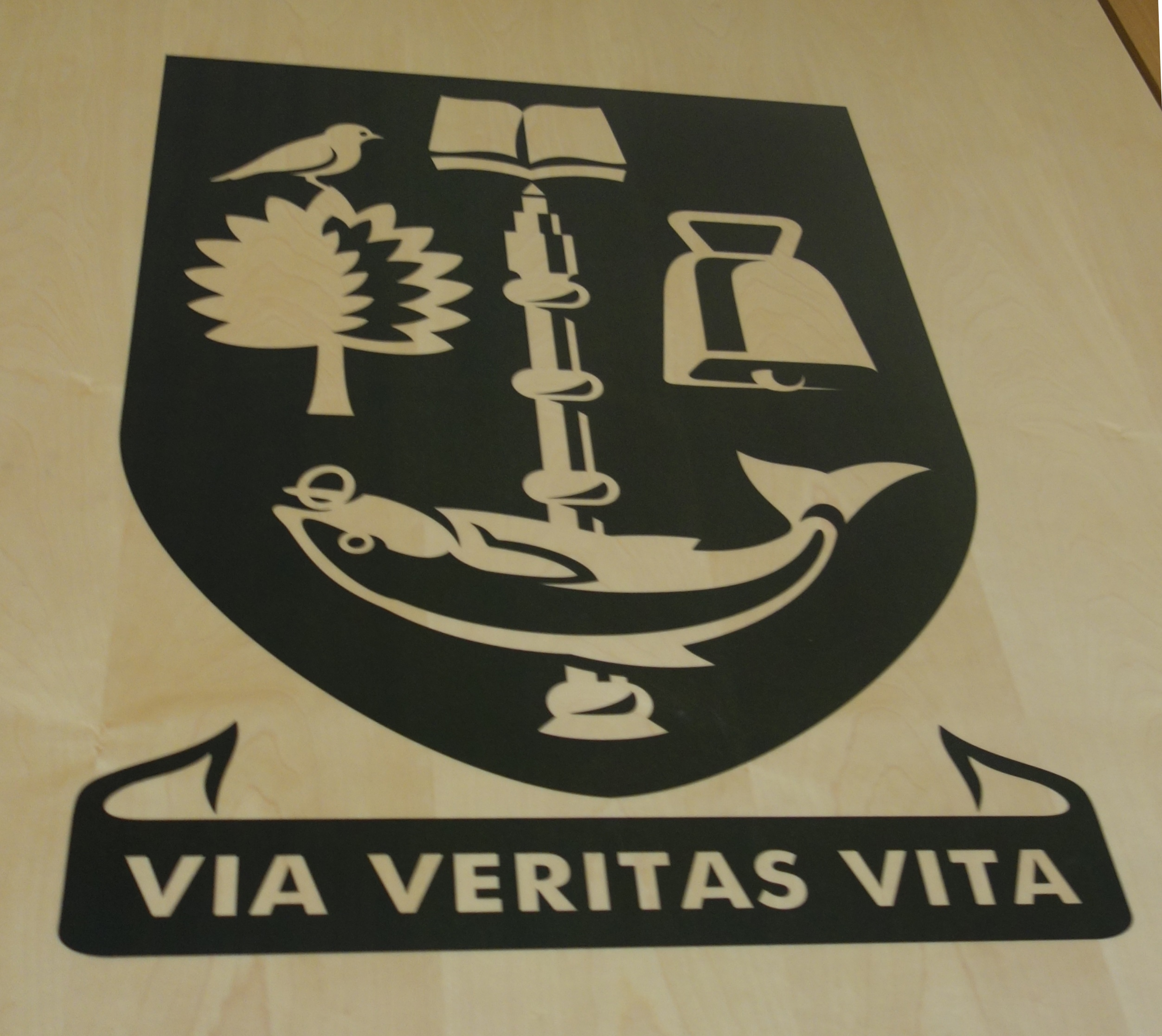
Via Veritas Vita (lat. "The path and the truth and the life", from Gospel of John 14:6). Motto of the University of Glasgow.

Alliteration is the repetition of syllable-initial consonant sounds between nearby words, or of syllable-initial vowels if the syllables in question do not start with a consonant. It is often used as a literary device. A common example is "Peter Piper picked a peck of pickled peppers".

== Historical use ==
The word alliteration derives from the Latin word littera, meaning "letter of the alphabet". It was first coined in a Latin dialogue by the Italian humanist Giovanni Pontano in the 15th century. Pontano, however, used the term in a broader sense to include examples where the repeated letter does not start a word or a stressed syllable, e.g. ex áere rigéntem.

Alliteration is used in the alliterative verse of Old English poems like Beowulf, Middle English poems like Sir Gawain and the Green Knight, Old Norse works like the Poetic Edda, and in Old High German, Old Saxon, and Old Irish. It was also used as an ornament to suggest connections between ideas in classical Latin, Greek, and Sanskrit poetry.

Today, alliteration is used poetically in various languages around the world, including German, Welsh, Mongolian, Hungarian, American Sign Language, Somali, Finnish, and Icelandic. It is also used in music lyrics, article titles in magazines and newspapers, and in advertisements, business names, comic strips, television shows, video games and in the dialogue and naming of cartoon characters.

== Types of alliteration ==
There are several concepts to which the term alliteration is sometimes applied:

=== Literary alliteration ===
Literary or poetic alliteration is often described as the repetition of identical initial consonant sounds in successive or closely associated syllables within a group of words. However, this is an oversimplification; there are several special cases that have to be taken into account:

==== Stressing of consonant sounds ====
The identical consonant sounds must be stressed in alliteration. However, the term "stressed" includes any syllable that counts as an upbeat in poetic meter. For example, in James Thomson's verse, "Come . . . dragging the lazy languid line along," the syllable "long" in "along" alliterates with the three previous words.

==== With vowel sounds ====
Some prosodists debate on whether the repetition of syllable-initial vowels functions count as alliteration, though they typically are considered to be able to alliterate. Syllable-initial vowels can alliterate regardless of which vowels are used. Vowel alliteration is not used infrequently; John Milton uses the device in about 6.2% (670 lines) of all lines Paradise Lost including "Where entrance up from Eden easiest," to name an example. However, same-vowel alliteration proves quite rare: in Milton only uses it ten times in his magnum opus (excluding same-word repetitions).

There are two contending theories on the reason that vowel alliteration works: the sonority of the vowel, which argues that despite the vowel's differing positions, a common element permits alliteration between any vowel (however, this fails to address why all consonants would not alliterate with each other); the other theory is related to the ubiquity of the glottal stop in pronouncing vowels which does not prompt the same issue as the latter theory.

==== With consonant clusters ====
Consonant clutters are able to alliterate with each other and the onset consonant; for example, the phrase "Bring a blessed boon" is alliterates thrice with the br-, bl-, and b-.

However, some claim that the consonant clusters sp-, st-, and sk- are unable to alliterate with s- but are able to alliterate within their same consonant though many of this claims are baseless; for instance in Barack Obama's phrase "same high standards of strength and sacrifice" it is nearly universally agreed same alliterates with sacrifice and standards with strength, some may argue the two pairs do not alliterate with each other

==== With similar consonants ====
Alliteration may also refer to the use of different but similar consonants, often because the two sounds were identical in an earlier stage of the language. For example, Middle English poems sometimes alliterate z with s (both originally s), or hard g with soft (fricative) g (the latter represented in some cases by the letter yogh – ȝ – pronounced like the y in yarrow or the j in Jotunheim).

=== Consonance ===
Consonance is a broader literary device involving the repetition of consonant sounds at any point in a word (for example, coming home, hot foot). Alliteration can then be seen as a special case of consonance where the repeated consonant sound opens the stressed syllable.

=== Head rhyme ===
Head rhyme or initial rhyme involves the creation of alliterative phrases where each word literally starts with the same letter; for example, "humble house", "potential power play", "picture perfect", "money matters", "rocky road", or "quick question". A familiar example is "Peter Piper picked a peck of pickled peppers".

=== Symmetrical alliteration ===
Symmetrical alliteration is a specialized form of alliteration which demonstrates parallelism or chiasmus. In symmetrical alliteration with chiasmus, the phrase must have a pair of outside end words both starting with the same sound, and pairs of outside words also starting with matching sounds as one moves progressively closer to the center. For example, with chiasmus: "rust brown blazers rule;" with parallelism: "what in earlier days had been drafts of volunteers were now droves of victims." Symmetrical alliteration with chiasmus resembles palindromes in its use of symmetry.

== Examples of use ==
=== Poetry ===
Poets can call attention to certain words in a line of poetry by using alliteration. They can also use alliteration to create a pleasant, rhythmic effect. In the following poetic lines, notice how alliteration is used to emphasize words and to create rhythm:

- "Give me the splendid silent sun with all his beams full-dazzling!' (Walt Whitman, "Give Me the Splendid Silent Sun")
- "They all gazed and gazed upon this green stranger, / because everyone wondered what it could mean/ that a rider and his horse could be such a 'colour- / green as grass, and greener it seemed/ than green enamel glowing bright against gold". (Note: The original in Middle English was: For vch mon had meruayle quat hit mene myȝt Þat a haþel and a horse myȝt such a hwe lach, As growe grene as þe gres and grener hit semed, Þen grene aumayl on golde glowande bryȝter.) (232-236) (Sir Gawain and the Green Knight, translated by Bernard O'Donoghue.)
- "Some papers like writers, some like wrappers. Are you a writer or a wrapper?" ("Paper I" by Carl Sandburg)

Alliteration can also add to the mood of a poem. If a poet repeats soft, melodious sounds, a calm or dignified mood can result. If harsh, hard sounds are repeated, on the other hand, the mood can become tense or excited. In this poem, alliteration of the s, l, and f sounds adds to a hushed, peaceful mood:

- "Softer be they than slippered sleep the lean lithe deer the fleet flown deer." (All in green went my love riding by E. E. Cummings)

==== Examples from alliterative verse ====
- "In the first age, the frogs dwelt / at peace in their pond: they paddled about ..." (Moralities by W.H. Auden)
- "Holocaust, pentecost: what heaped heartbreak: / The tendrils of fire forthrightly tasting foundation to rooftree ..." (My Grandfather's Church Goes Up by Fred Chappell)
- "Chestnuts fell in the charred season, / Fell finally, finding room / In air to open their old cases ..." (Another Reluctance by Annie Finch)
- "Fresh-firecoal chestnut-falls; finches' wings; / Landscape plotted & pieced -- fold, fallow, & plough ..." (Pied Beauty by Gerard Manley Hopkins)
- "Effortlessly at height hangs his still eye. / His wings hold all creation in a weightless quiet ..." (The Hawk in the Rain by Ted Hughes)
- "As one who wanders into old workings, / Dazed by the noonday, desiring coolness, Has found retreat barred by fall of rockface ..." (As One Who Wanders into Old Workings by C. Day Lewis)
- "We were talking of dragons, Tolkien and I / In a Berkshire bar. The big workman / Who had sat silent and sucked his pipe / All the evening, from his empty mug ..." (We Were Talking of Dragons by C. S. Lewis)
- "We set up mast and sail on that swart ship / Bore sheep aboard her, and our bodies also / Heavy with weeping, so winds from sternward / Bore us out onward with bellying canvas ..." (Canto I by Ezra Pound)
- "Out of doubt, out of dark to the day's rising / I came singing in the sun, sword unsheathing ..." (Eomer's Wrath by J.R.R. Tolkien)
- "An axe angles from my neighbor's ashcan; / It is hell's handiwork, the wood not hickory, ..." (Junk by Richard Wilbur)

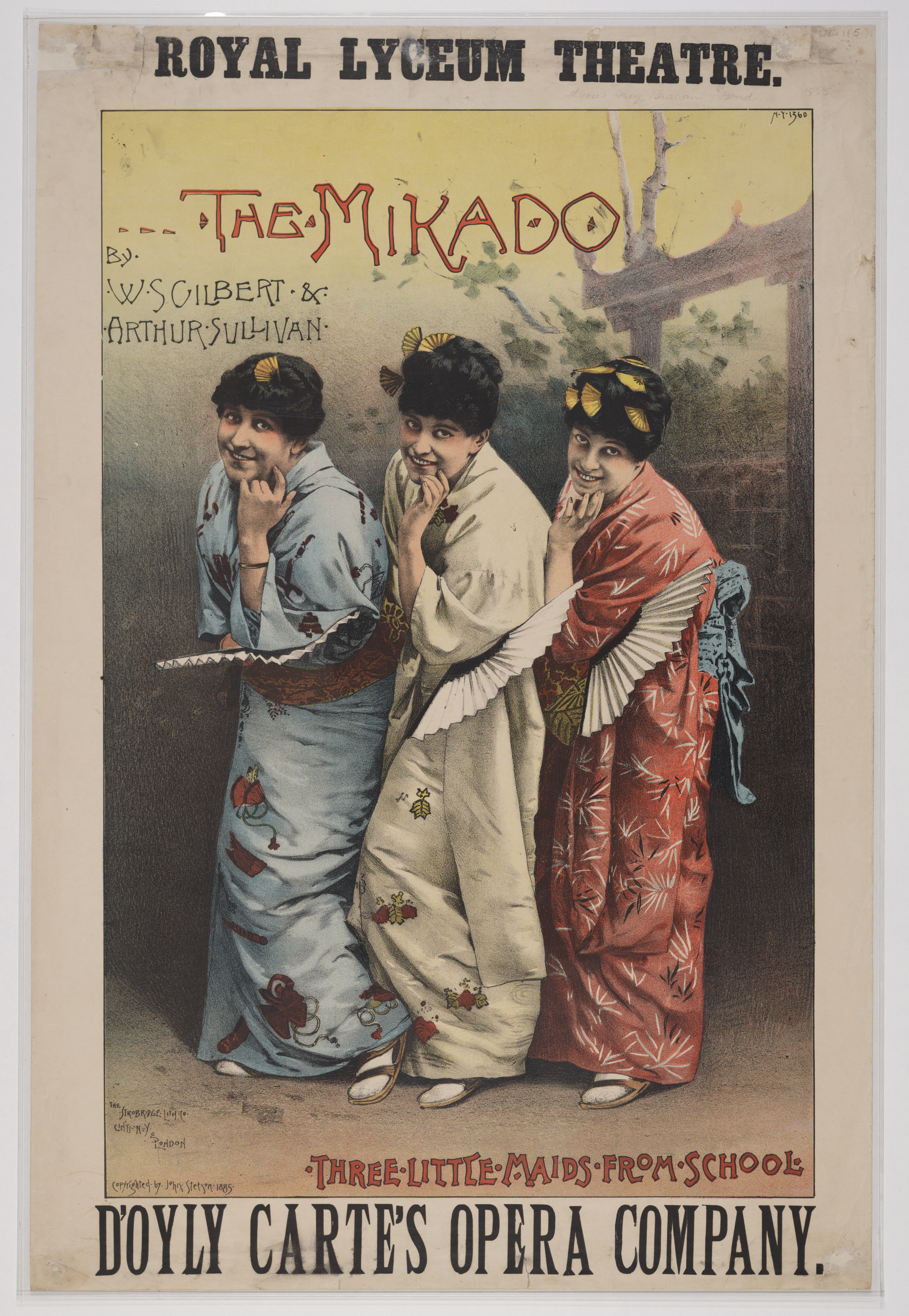
Gilbert and Sullivan's comic opera The Mikado contains a well-known example of alliterative lyrics: "To sit in solemn silence in a dull, dark dock, In a pestilential prison, with a lifelong lock, Awaiting the sensation of a short, sharp shock, From a cheap and chippy chopper on a big black block!"

==== Lines from other poems ====
- "And the silken sad uncertain rustling of each purple curtain" (The Raven by Edgar Allan Poe)
- "The fair breeze blew, the white foam flew / The furrow followed free" (The Rime of the Ancient Mariner by Samuel Taylor Coleridge)
- "I have stood still and stopped the sound of feet" (Acquainted with the Night by Robert Frost)
- "I hear lake water lapping with low sounds by the shore" (The Lake Isle of Innisfree by W. B. Yeats)
- "And churlish chiding of the winter's wind / Which, when it bites and blows upon my body" (from William Shakespeare's play As You Like It)
- "A pleasing calm; while broad and brown, below / Extensive harvests hang the heavy head" (Autumn by James Thomson)

==== Alliteration combined with rhyme ====
- "Great Aunt Nellie and Brent Bernard who watch with wild wonder at the wide window as the beautiful birds begin to bite into the bountiful birdseed" ("Thank-You for the Thistle" by Dorie Thurston)
- "Three grey geese in a green field grazing. Grey were the geese and green was the grazing." (From the nursery rhyme Three Grey Geese by Mother Goose)
- "Betty Botter bought a bit of butter, but she said, this butter's bitter; if I put it in my batter, it will make my batter bitter, but a bit of better butter will make my bitter batter better..." (from the tongue-twister rhyme Betty Botter by Carolyn Wells)
- "Peter Piper picked a peck of pickled peppers. If Peter Piper picked a peck of pickled peppers, where's the peck of pickled peppers Peter Piper picked?" (anonymous tongue-twister rhyme)

==== Music lyrics ====
- "Helplessly Hoping" by Crosby, Stills, Nash & Young has rich alliteration in every verse.
- "Mr. Tambourine Man" by Bob Dylan employs alliteration throughout the song, including the lines: "Yes, to dance beneath the diamond sky with one hand waving free / Silhouetted by the sea, circled by the circus sands."
- "Mother Nature's Son" by The Beatles includes the line: "Swaying daisies sing a lazy song beneath the sun."
- "Spieluhr" by Rammstein includes a spoken line: "Das kleine Herz stand still für Stunden" (eng. "The little heart stood still for hours).
- "Fairyland Fanfare" by Falconer has a part that alliterates the "l" over 30 times: "Live the legend, live life all alone / Longing to linger in lore / Illuminating a lane / That leads you aloft / You're lost to the lunar lure / Leave the languish / Leave lanterns of lorn / Lend lacking lustre to lies / Liberate the laces / Of life for the lone / Lest lament yet alights"
- "Werewolves of London" by Warren Zevon includes the line "Little old lady got mutilated late last night."

=== Rhetoric ===
Literary alliteration has been used in various spheres of public speaking and rhetoric. It can also be used as an artistic constraint in oratory to sway the audience to feel some type of urgency, or another emotional effect. For example, S sounds can imply danger or make the audience feel as if they are being deceived. Other sounds can likewise generate positive or negative responses. Alliteration serves to "intensify any attitude being signified".

An example is in John F. Kennedy's Inaugural Address, in which he uses alliteration 21 times; the last paragraph of his speech is given as an example here:

"Finally, whether you are citizens of America or citizens of the world, ask of us here the same high standards of strength and sacrifice which we ask of you. With a good conscience our only sure reward, with history the final judge of our deeds, let us go forth to lead the land we love, asking His blessing and His help, but knowing that here on Earth God's work must truly be our own." — John F. Kennedy

==== Examples of alliteration from public speeches ====
- "I have a dream that my four little children will one day live in a nation where they will not be judged by the color of their skin but by the content of their character." — Martin Luther King Jr.
- "We, the people, declare today that the most evident of truths—that all of us are created equal—is the star that guides us still; just as it guided our forebears through Seneca Falls, and Selma, and Stonewall; just as it guided all those men and women, sung and unsung, who left footprints along this great Mall, to hear a preacher say that we cannot walk alone; to hear a King proclaim that our individual freedom is inextricably bound to the freedom of every soul on Earth". — Barack Obama.
- "And our nation itself is testimony to the love our veterans have had for it and for us. All for which America stands is safe today because brave men and women have been ready to face the fire at freedom's front." — Ronald Reagan, Vietnam Veterans Memorial Address.
- "Four score and seven years ago our fathers brought forth on this continent a new nation, conceived in liberty, and dedicated to the proposition that all men are created equal". — Abraham Lincoln, Gettysburg Address.
- "Patent portae; proficiscere!" ("The gates are open; depart!") — Cicero, In Catilinam 1.10.
- "Ceterum censeo Carthaginem esse delendam." ("Furthermore, I consider that Carthage must be destroyed") — Cato the Elder
- "Bleach blonde bad-built butch body" — Jasmine Crockett

Translation can lose the emphasis developed by this device. For example, in the accepted Greek text of Luke 10:41 the repetition and extension of initial sound are noted as Jesus doubles Martha's name and adds an alliterative description: Μάρθα Μάρθα μεριμνᾷς (Martha, Martha, merimnas). This is lost in the English NKJ and NRS translations "Martha, Martha, you are worried and distracted by many things."

== See also ==
- Alliteration (Latin)
- Anadiplosis
- Cynghanedd
- Literary consonance
- Onomatopoeia
- Parechesis
- Tautogram
