= Eochaidh Ó hÉoghusa =

Irish bardic poet (1568–1612)

Eochaidh Ó hÉoghusa, or O'Hussey in English, (c. 1568 – 9 June 1612) was an Irish bardic poet.

== Life ==
A native of Ulster, born probably in Baile Uí Eodhasa (Ballyhoo/Ballyhose), in what is now County Fermanagh, Ó hÉoghusa was employed for much of his life by the Mág Uidhir (Maguire) chiefs of Fermanagh. He received land during the Plantation of Ulster in 1610.

Among his most well-known works are several poems included in the Leabhar Branach, a literary compendium of mostly Gaelic poets of Leinster, dedicated to the O'Byrne chiefs of Wicklow who "by their success in maintaining the independence and integrity of their mountainous territory against great odds until the final collapse, they were in a position to attract poets of repute from distant parts of Ireland."

Not only did he compose praises for the Maguires, but wrote a poem in 1603 ('Mór theasda dh'obair Óivid..') celebrating the enthronement of James VI in Scotland, and in his obituary, the poet was lauded as a man "esteemed by the Gael and the Foreigner".

== Selected works ==
Some of his compositions include:

- An tú ar gcéadaithne, a charrag?
- A-tám i gcás eidir dhá chomhairle
- Bíodh aire ag Ultaibh ar Aodh
- Dealg athálaidh othras Taidhg
- Fód codarsna críoch Bhanbha
- Fúar liom an adhaighsi dh'Aodh
- Ionmholta malairt bhisigh

== See also ==
- Filí, the elite bardic poet class of Gaelic Ireland
- Aodh Mág Uidhir, Lord of Fermanagh, and a patron of Ó hÉoghusa
