= Cormac Mac Con Midhe =

Irish poet

Cormac Mac Con Midhe, a.k.a. Cormac mac Cearbhaill Mac Con Midhe (died 1627) was an early Modern Irish poet.

Manuscript H.5.6, held at Trinity College, Dublin, contains a poem of 24 stanzas apparently written by Mac Con Midhe for Toirealach Ó Néill of Sliocht Airt Óig of Tyrone and his wife, Sorcha. It survives in another copy of 188 lines in MS 1291 (formerly H.1.17), also in Trinity, both being made by Hugh O'Daly in the middle 18th century for a Dr. Sullivan. According to Ó Diobhlin (2000), "Because of the corruptness of the copy the poem has never been edited, nor have its contents been deciphered ... Toirealach was transplanted to Connacht, and then he disappears from history after the Jacobite rebellion."
