= List of Irish historians =

A list of Irish historians is presented in this article, from the earliest times up to the present day, by historical periods and in alphabetically order for easier reference.

Many of the earlier historians would have been known in their time as: "Irish Men and Women of Learning". A number of those listed below were scholars in different fields: literature, mathematics, theology, biography, narratives, hagiography, grammar.

== Legendary and pre-historic era ==
- Fenius Farsaid

== Early Medieval Era: 5th–12th centuries ==
- Adamnan, died 704
- Aileran the Wise, died 665
- Bernard of Chartres
- Cadac-Andreas
- Candidus
- Clemens the Grammarian
- Cogitosus, fl. c. 650?
- Cummian
- Dicuil
- Donatus of Fiesole
- Finnian of Moville, died 579
- Iohannes
- Johannes Scottus Eriugena
- Mac Bethad, fl. 891
- Marianus Scotus of Mainz
- Martianus Hiberniensis of Laon
- Muirchu moccu Machtheni
- Pseudo-Augustine, fl. c. 655
- Ruben of Dairinis
- Secundinus
- Sedulius Scottus (Suadbar) fl. pre-844
- Tirechan
- Tuan mac Cairill, fl. pre-579
- Ultan of Ardbraccan, died 657

== Late Medieval Era: 12th–16th centuries ==
- Diarmaid Ó Cúlacháin, died 1221
- Adhamh O Cianain, died 1373
- Gilla Isa Mor mac Donnchadh MacFhirbhisigh, fl. 1390-1418
- Giolla na Naomh Mac Aodhagáin, fl. c. 1400
- Lawrence Walsh, fl. 1588
- Muireadach Albanach O Dalaigh, fl. c. 1220

== Early Modern Era: 17th–19th centuries ==
- Aonghus Ruadh na nAor O Dalaigh, died 1617
- James Ussher, Archbishop of Armagh, 1581-1656
- Thomas Carve, died 1672
- Charles O Conor, 1710-1791
- Cu Choigcriche O Cleirigh, c. 1662/1664
- Cú Choigcríche Ó Cléirigh, fl. 1627-1636
- Daniel O'Daly, died 1662
- Daibhidh O Duibhghennain, fl.1651-1696/1706
- Nicholas French, died 1678
- Dubhaltach MacFhirbhisigh, fl. 1643-1671
- Edward Ledwich, 1738-1823
- Eoin O Gnimh, fl. 1699
- John Colgan, OFM, 1592-1657
- Luke Wadding, OFM, 1588-1657
- George Petrie, 1790-1866
- James Hardiman, 1782-1855
- John O'Donovan, 1806-1861
- John O'Hart, 1824-1902
- Sylvester O'Halloran, 1728-1807
- Lughaidh O Cleirigh, fl. 1595-1630
- Matthew O Conor, 1773-1844
- Michael O'Clery, c. 1590-1643
- Owen Connellan, 1800-1869
- Peregrine O'Duignan, fl. 1627-1636
- Rev. Charles O Conor, 1767-1828
- Ruaidhri O Flaithbheartaigh, 1629-1716/1718
- Seathrún Céitinn/Geoffrey Keating, died 1643
- Sir James Ware, 1594-1666
- Sir John Thomas Gilbert, 1829-1898
- Sir William Petty, 1623-1687
- Standish Hayes O'Grady, 1832-1915
- Tadhg mac Daire Mac Bruaideadha, fl. 1616-1652
- Tuileagna Ó Maoil Chonaire, fl. 1638-1673
- Whitley Stokes, 1830-1909
- William Lecky, 1838-1903

== Modern historians ==
A well-reviewed survey of Irish historiography 1936–70 has been published. The list of contributors to The Princeton history of modern Ireland and The Oxford companion to Irish history are also relevant.

- James Auchmuty, 1909-1981
- Thomas Bartlett
- J. C. Beckett
- Lord Bew
- D. A. Binchy, 1899-1989
- Martin J. Blake, 1853-1931
- Peter Brown (historian)
- Ann Buckley
- Turtle Bunbury
- Francis John Byrne
- Nicholas Canny
- James Carney, 1914-1989
- Helena Concannon, 1878-1952
- R.V. Comerford
- Colm Connolly
- John de Courcy Ireland, 1911-2006
- Seán Cronin
- Louis Cullen
- Edmund Curtis, 1881-1943
- Maurice Curtis
- Fr. Patrick Dinneen SJ, 1860-1934
- Maureen Donovan O'Sullivan, 1887-1966
- Eamonn Duffy
- Owen Dudley Edwards
- Robin Dudley Edwards
- Marianne Elliott
- Ronan Fanning
- Brian Farrell
- Diarmaid Ferriter
- Roy Foster
- Tom Garvin
- Joe Graham, 1944-2021
- Alice Stopford Green, 1847–1929
- Aubrey Gwynn, SJ, 1892-1983
- Stephen Gwynn, 1864-1950
- Gerard Anthony Hayes-McCoy, 1911-1975
- Kathleen Hughes, 1926-1977
- James Kelly, 1959-
- Dermot Keogh
- J. J. Lee
- F. S. L. Lyons
- Dermot MacDermot, died 1989
- Edward MacLysaght, 1887-1986
- Eoin MacNeill, 1867-1945
- Gearóid Mac Niocaill
- Gearóid Mac Eoin
- F. X. Martin, 1922-2000
- Carmel McCaffrey
- Robert B. McDowell
- Hugh McFadden
- Hiram Morgan, 1960-
- Kenneth Nicholls
- Donnchadh Ó Corráin
- Dáibhí Ó Cróinín
- Patrick Denis O'Donnell
- Pádraig Ó Fiannachta
- Cormac Ó Gráda
- Nollaig Ó Muraíle
- T. F. O'Rahilly, 1883-1953
- Pádraig Ó Riain
- Matthew Potter
- Barry Raftery
- Sharon Slater
- ATQ Stewart
- Kitty Flynn
- Fr. Paul Walsh, 1885-1941
- Patrick Weston Joyce, 1827-1914
- Arthur Keaveney, 1951-2020
- Arte Walter Kenny
