= Ó Duibhgeannáin =

Historical family clan in Ireland

The Ó Duibhgeannáin (Irish pronunciation: [oː ˈd̪ˠɪvʲɟən̪ˠaːnʲ]) clan were a family of professional historians in medieval and early modern Ireland.

They originated in the kingdom of Annaly (formerly called Tethbae) on the east bank of the Shannon (mostly situated in what is now County Longford) and later migrated into Connacht. Writing in 1921 the Irish historian, Fr. Paul Walsh stated that "The celebrated Dubhaltach MacFhirbhisigh ... informs us that the O Duigenans followed the profession of historiographers under the families of Clann Mhaiolruanaidh and Conmhaicne in Magh Rein, that is, with the Mac Dermotts and the MacDonoughs in the west, and with the O Farrells in the territory of Annaly."

The earliest known reference to a bearer of the surname dates to 1296, when, according to the Annals of the Four Masters, "Maelpeter O'Duigennan, Archdeacon of Breifny, from Drumcliff to Kells, died." Less than thirty years later in the year 1323 (according to the same source) – "Gillapatrick O'Duigennan, Chief Historian of Conmaicne, and Lucas, his son, were slain by Conor, the son of Garvey Maguire."

The family themselves can be traced back with confidence several centuries further, ultimately to Maine of Tethba, an alleged son of Niall of the Nine Hostages. While Maine's relationship is probably fictitious, there seems to be no good reason for doubting that the O Duibhgeannain descend from the figure claimed as an ancestor by the rulers of Uí Maine.

== From Annaly to Moylurg: Kilronan and Castlefore ==
By the 14th century, while some lines of the family remained in Annaly, the senior branches and others moved west into Moylurg where they became historians for the MacDermots. The senior line, under Ferghall Muimhneach, built St Ronan's church at Kilronan, Ballyfarnon, Co. Roscommon, in 1339 to which they became erenachs, or its lay proprietors. They remained as ollamhs and erenaghs in the area until at least the 18th century. The Four Masters include the following early references to the family, and Kilronan church:

- "1339: The church of Kilronan was erected by Farrell Muimhneach O'Duigenan."
- "1340: Philip O'Duigenan, ollav [chief poet] of Conmaicne, died. The church of Kilronan was burned."
- "1347: The church of Kilronan was re-erected by Farrell O'Duigenan. Finola, daughter of Mac Fineen, and wife of Farrell O'Duigenan, died."
- "1357: Clement O'Duigenan, Vicar of Kilronan, died. He was called Sagart-na-Sinnach [Priest of the Foxes]. Muimhneach O'Duigennan, ollav of Conmaicne and Clann-Mulrony, Lower and Upper, died."
- "1360: Naevag O'Duigennan died."
- "1362: Cu-Connacht O Duigeannain, Vicar of Cill Ronain, rested in Christ."
- "1381: Lasairiona, daughter of Ferghal O Duigeannain, wife of O Mithin [Meehan], of Bealach ui Mithin, died."
- "1398: David O Duigeannain, Coarb of the Virgin St. Lasair, chief chronicler of MacDiarmuda [MacDermott] and his great favourite, a hospitaller for all comers of Eirinn in general, a reverend attendant of a nobleman, and one that never refused anyone for anything he had until his death, died in his house and was interred in the Church of Cill Ronan."

By 1400 a secondary line had established themselves in Muintir Eolais, at Baile Caille Foghair, or Castlefore, now in County Leitrim. Their ancestor was Philip na hInishe who died in Conmaicne in 1340, said to be a brother of Fearghall Muimhneach. The first member of the family mentioned as of Castlefore was Maghnus mac Melaghlin Ruadh O Duibggeannain, who died in 1452. He is apparently the same Maghnus of Castlefore was the chief compiler of the Book of Ballymote, which was commissioned by Tomaltach MacDonagh, Lord of Coran, about or after 1391.

Irish historical manuscripts compiled and penned by various O Duibhgeannain which have survived their turbulent times include:

- Annala Loch Ce (The Annals of Loch Ce)
- Leabhair O Duibhgeannain Cill Ronan – source book used for the Four Masters.
- The Annals of the Kingdom of Ireland (better known as the Annals of the Four Masters)
- Suibhne Gelt (The Frenzy of Sweeney)

== Peregrine and Daibhidh ==
The two most significant Ó Duibhgeannáins during the final years of Gaelic Ireland were Cu Coigriche mac Tuathal O Duibhgeannain of Castlefore (fl. 1627–1636), and Daibhidh mac Matthew Glas O Duibhgeann of Kilronan (fl. 1651–1696).

Cu Coigriche, thought to have been born about or after 1590, was ordained a Franciscan friar and changed his name to Peregrine O'Duignan. Nothing is known of his life until he became engaged in the massive project known to history as the Annals of the Kingdom of Ireland (better known by its nickname, the Annals of the Four Masters). The annals are known by this name because, under the leadership of Bro. Michael O'Clery (Michael Ó Cleirigh), Peregrine, Cu Choigriche (Peregrine) Ó Cleirigh, and Fearfeasa Ó Maoilchonaire, these four men compiled and wrote in a few years (c. 1627–1636) one of the largest collections of mythical, historical and cultural lore – spanning the years 2242 AM to 1616 AD.

Nothing certain is known of Peregrine after August 1636; possibly he returned to Louvain, as did Ó Cleirigh. However, there exists a slight possibility that he remained in Ireland, as a copy of the annals was in the town of Galway, and used as a source by none other than Dubhaltach MacFhirbhisigh, who explicitly references having used it in 1649, although typically he gives us no clues as to how he obtained it. It may not be coincidental that a kinsman of Ó Duibhgeannáin, Daibhidh Ó Duibhgeannáin living and working in the Galway region from as early as 1651.

Daibhidh mac Matthew Glas Ó Duibhgeannáin, or Daibhidh Bacach ("lame David") as he sometimes called himself, was an active scribe, compiler, poet between the years 1651 and 1696. In the earliest of his known works, Royal Irish Academy Ms. 24.P.9., he writes on page 238: "I stop now, and I on Loch Mask in the house of Tadhg Og Ó Flaherty, 1 April 1651, David Duigenan who wrote this." A later entry specifies the place as Oilean Ruadh, or Red Island. Over the course of his life he penned such works as "The Frenzy of Sweeney", "The Adventures of the Two Idiot Saints", "The Battle of Magh Rath", and "The Banquet of Dun na Gedh". He is believed to have lived his final years in Shancough, Tirerrill, County Sligo, where he died in 1696.

== Genealogy of Ó Duibhgeannáin of Kilronan, Moylurg ==
Taken from MacFhirbhisigh's Book of Genealogies; faulty in places. For purported ancestry prior to Maine of Tethba, see Niall of the Nine Hostages.

  Maine of Tethba
    |
    |________________________________________
    |        |      |           |      |
    |        |      |           |      |
    Fiachna Eanna Creamthann Brian Bracan
                                |
                                |_____________
                                |            |
                                |            |
                                Breanainn Criomhthann
                                |
                                |__________________________
                                |            |          |
                                |            |          |
                                Criomthann Connhach Aodh
                                                        |
                                ________________________|
                                |         |             |
                                |         |             |
                                Corc Cathasach Blathmhac
                                |                       |
                                |                       |
                                Aodh Conghall
                                                        |
                                                        |
                                                        Colla
                                                        |
   _____________________________________________________|_______
   |        |            |          |               |          |
   |        |            |          |               |          |
   Conaig Conghalach Murchadh Muirchertaigh Diarmaid Conchobair
                                                               |
                                                               |
                                                               Breasal
                                                               |
                                                    ___________|
                                                    |          |
                                                    |          |
                                                    Braighte Gabhalach
                                                    |
                                                    |_________________
                                                    |                 |
                                                    |                 |
                                                    Maol Beannachta Fionnachta
                                                    |
                                                    |__________
                                                    |         |
                                                    |         |
                                                    Tadhgan Maol Odhair
                                                    |
   _________________________________________________|________________________________
   |           |                   |           |          |           |            |
   |           |                   |           |          |           |            |
   Cearnachan  Duibhgeann   Dubhlaith Conghall Mughaighe Faghartach Madadhar
               |
               |
               Naomhtuc mac Duibhgeann
               |
               |
               Pilip na hInnise (Phillip of the Island) mac Naomhtuc O Duibhgeannain
               |
               |
               Poil an Fhiona (Paul of the Wine) mac Pilip O Duibhgeannain
               |
               |
               Lucais Ancaire (Lucas the Anchorite) mac Poil O Duibhgeannain
               |
               |
               Fearghail Mhuimhnigh (Fearghail of Munster) mac Lucais O Duibhgeannain, d. 1347
               |
               |
               Matha Ghlais mac Fearghail Mhuimhnigh O Duibhgeannain
               |
               |
               Maoileachlainn mac Matha Ghlais O Duibhgeannain
               |
               |
               Dubhthaigh Mhoir mac Maoileachlainn O Duibhgeannain, d. 1511
               |
               |________________________________________________________
               |                                                       |
               |                                                       |
               Dubhthaigh Oig mac Dubhtaigh Mhoir O Duibhgeannain      Maoilsechlainn
               |                                                       |
               |                                                       |
               Duilbh mac Dubhtaigh Oig O Duibhgeannain, d. 1578       Paidin
               |                                                       |
               |                                                       |
               Maolmhuire mac Duilbh O Duibhgeannain, fl. 1578         Dolbh
                                                                       |
                                                                       |
                                                                       Matthew Glas
                                                                       |
                                                                       |
                                                          Daibhidh Bacach O Duibhghennain
                                                                     fl. 1651–1696

== Last Ó Duibhgeannáin entries in the annals ==
- "1578: Ó Duibhgeannáin Cille Ronain (Dolbh mac Dubhthaigh) ollamh Ua n-Oilealla saoí senchaidh fer tighe aoidhedh coitchinn congairighe, fer suilbir, soingthe soagallmha d'écc, & a mhac Maol Muire do ghabhail a ionaidh." (Annala Rioghachta Éireann)
- "1578: O'Duigennan of Kilronan (Dolbh, son of Duffy), ollav of Tirerrill, a learned historian, who kept a thronged house of general hospitality; a cheerful, eloquent, and affable man, died; and his son, Mulmurry, took his place" (Annals of the Four Masters)

== Later Ó Duibhgeannáins and related names ==
=== Duigenans ===
- Patrick Duigenan (Irish lawyer and politician)

=== Duignans ===
- Katherine Duignan (writer)
- Mary Anne Duignan ("Chicago May") (international thief)
- Michael Duignan (New Zealand filmmaker)
- Michael V. Duignan (Professor of Celtic Archaeology, University College Galway, 1945–1977)
- Noel Duignan (Canadian politician)
- Sean Duignan (journalist, political aide)
- Packie Duignan (musician)
- Dr John Duignan (Scottish author whose books include "Skelp the Aged"; "The Buick Stops Here"; "Quantitative Methods For Business Research Using Microsoft Excel"; "Saving The Last Dance"; "Katherine Black Doesn't Dance"; "Things To Do When The Music Stops" and "A Dictionary of Business Research Methods")
- Kevin P Duignan (former Director and Vice President for Institutional Advancement at St. Thomas Aquinas College, Sparkill, NY - 1997 to 2017)
- William Duignan (playwright, actor)

=== Deignans ===
- Kathleen P. Deignan (Professor of Religious Studies, Head of the Iona Spirituality Institute at Iona College in New Rochelle, New York)
- Lizzie Deignan (British Olympian and road racing cyclist for Team Lidl-Trek)
- Osborn Deignan (US Navy, recipient of the Medal of Honor for his role in Spanish American Civil War (Merrimac))
- Philip Deignan (Irish: Pilib Ó Duígeannáin); (Irish Olympian and road racing cyclist for UCI ProTeam Team RadioShack)

=== Dignans ===
- John Dignan (Bishop of Clonfert)
- Patrick Dignan (19th-century Member of the New Zealand Parliament)
- Peter Dignan (Mayor of Auckland)
- Peter Dignan (New Zealand Olympic rower)

=== Dignams ===
- Arthur Dignam (Australian actor)
- Basil Dignam (British actor)
- Christy Dignam (Irish singer)
- Mark Dignam (British actor)

=== Degnans ===
- John J. Degnan (American politician)
- Tom Degnan (American actor)

=== Digmans ===
- James Digman Wingfield (British artist)

== See also ==
- Clan MacFhirbhisigh
- Irish genealogy
- List of Irish historians
