= Tuileagna Ó Maol Chonaire =

Irish historian

Tuileagna Ó Maol Chonaire (fl. 1637) was an Irish historian.

== Background ==
Tuileagna was a member of the Ó Maolconaire Brehon family, but it has proved difficult for researchers to uncover more detail about him. His antagonist, Fearfeasa Ó Maol Chonaire, said in a poem that his father's name was Seanchán. He might be identified with the Tuileagna Ó Maol Chonaire who was a student at the University of Louvain in 1625, or a student at the Irish College at Salamanca in April 1610, who was aged about twenty-five.

He is usually thought to have been the Tuileagna Ó Maol Chonaire recorded living in Madrid some years later. In March 1658, a man of that name authenticated a genealogical transcript, identifying himself as seancha coitcheann Éireann/general historian of Ireland. In September 1659, the same man transcribed a tract on grammar and prosody for Father Patrick Tyrrell, OFM, indicating that the man in Madrid had links with the Irish Franciscans, perhaps himself being a member of the order.

A later Tuileagna Ó Maol Chonaire added a note to Laud Misc 610 in Oxford, 1673, but his identity is unknown. An earlier Tuileagna Ó Maoil Chonaire, was a poet alive about 1585.

== Dispute with the Four Masters ==
In 1637, upon Mícheál Ó Cléirigh's return to Louvain with the finished autograph of the Annals of the Four Masters, Tuileagna publicly expressed concerns on four points of detail in Genalogiae regum et sanctorum Hiberniae and the Four Masters text, stating that the points cast a slur on the status of Connacht. He furthermore stated that Conchobhar Mac Bruaideadha withdrew his approbation in public following a general chapter of the Franciscans in Thomond in 1638, while stating that Flan Mac Aodhagáin had temporarily withdrawn his approbation in 1637 until the disputed points were resolved.

Discussion of the matter continued after Ó Cléirigh's death in 1643, and in part led to the delay in the publication of the work.

Two of the Masters, Cú Choigcríche Ó Cléirigh and Fearfeasa Ó Maol Chonaire, wrote responses in prose and verse to Tuileagna, though that of Cú Choigcríche has not survived.

Bernadette Cunningham has noted "That the Tuileagna Ó Maol Chonaire who criticized Ó Cléirigh's work was a Franciscan would have made it relatively easy for him to have the matter of the accuracy of AFM and associated texts raised at no less than three formal chapters of the order - at Thomond (1638), Multyfarnham (1641) and Dublin." (p. 266) She furthermore states:

"His citation of manuscripts in his criticism ... is of interest. He claimed to have judged the work against authoritative sources including Leabhar Chluana mac Nóis, Leabhar Chluana hEidhneach, Leabhar Leacain, Leabhar Chluana Plocáin ... a list not dissimilar to the authorities used by the Four Masters themselves ... It is unlikely, though not impossible, that he had many of these manuscripts to hand at the same time as he had access to the text of AFM, but Tuileagna nonetheless felt confident about their contents. At the very least, he must have moved in circles where he could claim to be familiar with such important manususcripts. It is mostly likely to have been when Ó Cléirigh was in Dublin in February 1637, obtaining the final approbations for his work from the archbishop, Thomas Fleming, OFM, and preparing to leave Ireland, that Tuileagna Ó Maol Chonaire availed of the opportunity to examine the work. It is noteworthy that Tuileagna also had access to the work of another Franciscan historian, Fláithrí Ó Maol Chonaire, together with the recently completed Foras Feasa ar Éirinn of Geoffrey Keating ... He also claimed to be the recipient of a letter from Flann Mac Aodhagáin withdrawing his approbation."

(p. 266)

Tuileagna did not offer to revise the text himself, instead proposing that the Reverend Brian Flann Mac Aodhagáin and others assess it.

== Publication delay ==
Tuileagna's views held enough influence within the Irish Franciscan community to delay publication. While manuscripts of the Annals circulated for generations, it was only in 1846 that a version translated into English was published by Owen Connellan, and only as far as 1171. John O'Donovan edited the six volumes that comprised the full text published in the 1850s.
