= Cú Choigcríche Ó Cléirigh =

Irish historian and genealogist

Cú Choigcríche Ó Cléirigh (fl. 1624–1664) was an Irish historian and genealogist, known in English as Peregrine O'Clery. He is known for his contributions to the Annals of the Four Masters, alongside Mícheál Ó Cléirigh, Fearfeasa Ó Maol Chonaire, and Peregrine Ó Duibhgeannain.

== Life and work ==
Cú Choigcríche was born c. 1580 in County Donegal, and was the eldest son of Maccon Ó Cléirigh. The family were hereditary historians to the O'Donnell dynasty of Tyrconnell.

However, Paul Walsh believed him to be a son of Diarmad mac An Chosnamhghaigh mac Concoigríche mac Diarmada Ó Cléirigh, who died in 1552. This Diarmaid was a brother of Tuthal (died 1512) and Giolla Riabhach (died 1527).

Mícheál Ó Cléirigh was the son of Donnchaidh, a son of Uilliam son of Tuathail Ó Cléirigh, who died in 1512. The first modern-day editor of the annals, John O'Donovan, believed that Ó Cléirigh was the son of the poet and historian Lughaidh Ó Cléirigh, although this has since been disputed.

Along with Brother Mícheál, Ó Cléirigh transcribed the years 1332–1608 in the annals. The earliest copy of Lughaidh Ó Cléirigh's life of Aodh Ruadh Ó Domhnaill is in his handwriting. He also wrote a poem on Mary, sister of Red Hugh O'Donnell, who died in 1662, which is now among the Phillips Manuscripts at the National Library of Ireland.

He seems to have given material to Dubhaltach MacFhirbhisigh, which the latter inserted on page 299 of Leabhar na nGenealach

His own principal work is the compilation known as the O'Clery Book of Genealogies.

He died at Gortnaheltia, in the valley of Glenhest at the foot of Nephin Beg, overlooking Lough Beltra. He bequeathed his books to his sons Diarmaid and Seán.

It is believed that Cú Choigcríche's descendants are the Cleary and Clarke families of Brackleagh, Glenhest, Burrishoole, County Mayo.

== The O'Clery Book of Genealogies ==
- The O'Clery Book of Genealogies

== See also ==
- Tadhg Og Ó Cianáin
- Peregrine Ó Duibhgeannain
- Lughaidh Ó Cléirigh
- Mícheál Ó Cléirigh
- James Ussher
- Sir James Ware
- Mary Bonaventure Browne
- Dubhaltach Mac Fhirbhisigh
- Ruaidhrí Ó Flaithbheartaigh
- Uilliam Ó Duinnín
- Charles O'Conor (historian)
- Eugene O'Curry
- John O'Donovan (scholar)

== Sources ==
- O'Clerys in west Mayo, by Padraig Ó Móghráin, pp. 70–73, in Measgra i gCuimhne Mhichíl Chléirigh, ed. S. O'Brien, 1944.
- The Celebrated Antiquary: Dubhaltach Mac Fhirbhisigh (c.1600-1671) - His Life, Lineage and Learning,, by Nollaig Ó Muraíle, An Sagart, Maynooth, 1996; reprinted 2003. ISBN 1-903896-05-3; ISSN 0790-8806. See pages xix, 12, 20–1, 27, 59, 172, 176, 183, 214, 234–6, 275, 327–8.
- Notes on Cú Choigcríche Ó Cléirigh One of the Four Masters, Cathair na Mart 2001 (Journal of the Westport Historical Society), pp. 27–44, An Br. Angelo Mac Shamhais, OSF.
- Irish Leaders and Learning through the Ages, edited by Nollaig Ó Muraíle, Four Courts Press, Dublin, 2003. ISBN 1-85182-543-6
