= Abe Martin =

Abe Martin may refer to:

- Abe Martin (comic strip), ran in U.S. newspapers from 1904 until 1937
- Abe Martin (Illinois coach) (1906–1997), born Morris Glenn Martin, American football, basketball and baseball coach
- Abe Martin (Texas coach) (1908–1979), born Othol Hershel Martin, American college football player, head coach and administrator

== See also ==
- Abraham Martin, British Crown's judicial representative as High Sheriff of Sligo in 1805 Ireland
- Abby Martin (disambiguation)
- Abbé Martin (disambiguation)
- Abbey of Saint Martin (disambiguation)
- Abbot Martin (527–601), French hermit and evangelist
- Abbess Martin (1604–1672), Irish nun from Galway
- Martin Abraham (born 1978), Czech footballer
- Martin Abraham (1886–1981), American jazz tubist, stage name Chink Martin
