= Abbé Martin (disambiguation) =

Abbé Martin usually refers to Paulin Martin, a biblical scholar specializing in Semitic languages (full name Abbé Paulin Martin).

Abbé Martin, Abbot Martin or Abbess Martin, may also refer to:

- Abbé Martin, secondary co-author (or author quoted extensively by Abbé Raynal) of the Histoire des deux Indes
- Abbé Martin (early 19th century), priest in charge of the Parish Church of St. Aphrodise in Béziers, southern France (see Seafield Convent Grammar School § Revolutionary origins)

== See also ==
- Abby Martin (disambiguation)
- Abbey of Saint Martin (disambiguation)
- Abbess Martin (1604–1672), Abbess of the Poor Clares of Galway
- Abbot Martin (527–601), Abbot and founder of Vertou Abbey
