= Mary Clare Kennedy =

17th-century Irish nun

Mary Clare Kennedy (fl. 1647) was the second Abbess of the Poor Clares of Galway.

Kennedy became abbess sometime in the mid-1640s. Ó Muraíle has drawn attention to the fact that of the twelve sisters and two novices that founded the Galway convent, twelve had Anglo-Irish surnames yet two, including Kennedy, bore Gaelic surnames.

Her background is obscure. Her presence amid a group of mainly Anglo-Irish women may not have been out of place. There is strong evidence for the use and status of the Irish language within the community. Her successor, Mary Bonaventure Browne, commissioned Dubhaltach Mac Fhirbhisigh to complete the work of translating The Rule of St. Clare, and related documents, into Irish.

Kennedy was succeeded by Browne in 1647 and was among the sisters when Galway surrendered to Cromwellian forces in April 1652. Her subsequent fate is unknown.

Preceded by Mary Gabriel Martyn	Abbess of the Poor Clares of Galway ?–1647	Succeeded by Mary Bonaventure Browne
