= Julia Nolan =

Julia Nolan (1611–1701) was a prioress of the Dominican nuns in Galway, Ireland from 1686 to 1701.

== Family background ==
Nolan was born in the town of Galway, a member of a Gaelic merchant family who settled in the town during the reign of Henry VI and Edward IV. The family's armorial designs on c. 1651 map, alongside Fallone, Lambert, Quinne, Tully and Porte, with this inscription underneath:

Conscripti cives hi gaudent leg bus urbis/Quos facit et fraters connubialis amor. (Our common rights, these, late enfranchised, prove,/and claim a kindred thro' connubial love).

Hardiman states that "This family was, formerly, of the first rank and opulence and is still wealthy and respectable."

The Nolans were not included among the elite group known as The Tribes of Galway but the family were prosperous enough to marry into the Tribes and purchase property such as Ballinrobe castle. Thomas Nolan of the castle and town of Ballinrobe, Esq., who died 18 June 1628, "was possessed of most extensive landed possessions; to which his son Gregory succeeded, and out of which his widow Agnes Martin had dower".

A town statute of 1500 mentions "Donell Oge O’Vollaghon, of this town, goldsmith' who was made free at the request of Andrewe Fallon, whose daughter, Julian Fallon, was married to Donell; make him free "on condition of maintaining him" (Andrew) ‘'who is old and impotent".

Thomas Oge Nolan refused to sign the 1652 Articles of Surrender. Thomas Nolan was a proprietor in the town in 1641, and was evicted by 1657.

== Life as a Dominican ==
Julia Nolan was a member of the Dominican order at the time of its establishment in Galway, c. 1644. But upon the town's surrender to Charles Coote, 1st Earl of Mountrath in 1652, the nuns were expelled and exiled to Spain. Other religious women exiled included Mary Gabriel Martyn and Mary Bonaventure Browne.

== Return to Galway ==
In 1686, Nolan returned with Maria Lynch; they been appointed prioress and sub-prioress, in an effort to reestablish the community in Galway. Within two years, thanks to the regime of James II of England, the nuns had both prospered and gained new recruits.

== Second dispersal ==
With the defeat of Jacobite forces at the Battle of Aughrim in 1691, their future again came into question. In 1698, they were again dispersed. James Hardiman wrote of the event:

It was most deplorable ... to witness the cries and tears of these distressed females, by which even their very persecutors were moved to compassion. The convent was converted into a barrack; but the nuns remained secretly in town, among their friends, under the direction of the venerable prioress ...

Hardiman further states that "the venerable prioress ... was released by death from all her sufferings" in 1701, aged 90. She was succeeded by Maria Lynch, under whom the entire community were again forced to leave Galway.

| Preceded by ? | Prioress of the Dominican Nuns of Galway; 1686–1701 | Succeeded by Maria Lynch |
