= Fearfeasa Ó Maol Chonaire =

Irish poet and historian

Fearfeasa Ó Maol Chonaire, sometimes Fearfeasa O'Mulconry and other variations, (fl. 1630s) was an Irish chronicler who is primarily known as the co-compiler and scribe of the Annals of the Four Masters.

== Family background ==
Ó Maol Chonaire was a member of the Ó Maolconaire brehon family of north County Roscommon in Connacht. A member of the Sliocht Pháidín, his genealogy was Fearfeasa mac Lochlainn mac Séan Ruadh (died 1589) mac Lochlainn mac Paidín Ó Maolconaire (died 1506). He was thus closely related to Muirgheas mac Pháidín Ó Maolconaire (died 1543) and his descendants, Fláithrí Ó Maol Chonaire (died 1629) and Muiris mac Torna Ó Maolconaire (died 1645).

It has been suggested by Eoin Mac Cárthaigh that Fearfeasa's lands were in the townland of Creta, parish of Kiltrustan, beside that of his father, Lochlainn, who lived in Lisheen townland. Páidín Ruadh Ó Maol Chonaire, who retained two-thirds of his lands in Ballymulconry in the 1650s, may have been Fearfeasa's brother.

Peter (fl. 1701), son of Fearfasa, was poet to the O'Róduighe, and lived in County Leitrim.

== The Four Masters ==
He was one of the authors of the Annals of the Kingdom of Ireland and, with the three other chief writers, was included by John Colgan in the designation Annales Quatuor Magistrorum (Preface to Acta Sanctorum Hiberniæ, p. 7), which has become the popular name of the book.

As a young man, he participated in the compilation of the Annals of the Four Masters, working with Mícheál Ó Cléirigh, Cú Choigcríche Ó Cléirigh, Peregrine Ó Duibhgeannain and other assistants. He is identified by Bernadette Cunningham as the scribe of hand E in the autograph of the Annals of the Four Masters. He participated in the compilation of the years up to 1333 with Ó Duibhgeannáin, the Ó Cléirigh's writing the rest of the book to 1616.

== Opposition to Tuileagna Ó Maol Chonaire ==
Fearfeasa strenuously opposed Tuileagna Ó Maol Chonaire, whose criticisms of the work of the Four Masters prevented its publication in the 1640s.

== Poet ==
Fearfeasa was the author of many poems, one of which was Mochean do[d] chuairt a Chalbhaigh, addressed to An Calbhah Ruadh Ó Domhnaill.

== Family tree:An Sliocht Pháidín ==
  Paidín mac Lochlainn meic Maelsechlainn Ó Maolconaire, d. 1506 (a quo Sliocht Pháidín)
  |
  |_________________________________________________
  |                                                |
  |                                                |
  Lochlainn                                        Muirgheas mac Pháidín Ó Maolconaire, d. 1543. 
  |                                                |
  |                                                |_____________ 
  Séan Ruadh, d. 1589.                             |           |
  |                                                |           |
  |                                                Eóluis      Fíthil and Onóra___________
  Lochlainn                                        |           |              |          |
  |                                                |           |              |          |
  |______________________________________          Torna       Moileachlain   Firbisigh  Fláithri, Archbishop of Tuam, 1560-1629
  |                                     |
  |                                     |
  Fearfeasa, fl. 1620s-1640s.   Páidín Ruadh?, fl. 1654-58
