= Doran River Bundoran =

Historical river name associated with Bundoran, County Donegal

Doran (also recorded as Dooran and Doorron) is a historical place-name and river name associated with Bundoran, County Donegal, Ireland. The name is connected with the Irish place-name Bun Dobhráin, generally translated as "the foot of the little water". The nineteenth-century Irish place-name scholar Patrick Weston Joyce interpreted Bundoran as referring to the mouth of a small river formerly known as Doran.

The name Doran appears in a record from 1603 relating to the Gaelic historian Lughaidh Ó Cléirigh. The spelling Dooran was also used by the poet William Allingham in his nineteenth-century description of the coast around Bundoran.

Local place-name tradition identifies Doran as a supposed ancient name of the Bradoge River or the river on Main Beach, Bundoran.

== Etymology ==
The Irish name of Bundoran is Bun Dobhráin. The element bun denotes the end, foot or mouth of a river. The second element is associated with dobhar, an Irish word for water.

In 1875, Patrick Weston Joyce discussed the origin of Bundoran in The Origin and History of Irish Names of Places, Second Series, page 380.

Joyce interpreted the name as indicating that a small river entering the sea near the village had formerly been called Doran. He proposed the form Dobharan, meaning "little water", and compared the size of the stream with the much larger nearby Drowes and Erne rivers.

== Historical records ==
=== Doran in 1603 ===
One of the earliest recorded uses of the place-name Doran is associated with Lughaidh Ó Cléirigh, a Gaelic historian and poet connected with the O'Donnell dynasty of Tír Chonaill.

In 1603, Ó Cléirigh participated in a commission established to investigate the boundaries of Tír Chonaill.

According to the Royal Irish Academy's Dictionary of Irish Biography, the commission's record describes Ó Cléirigh as a chronicler residing at a place called Doran, citing the Irish patent rolls of James I.

A transcription of the record gives his description as:

"Loy O'Clere of Doran, cronocler"

The record establishes the use of Doran as a place-name in the early seventeenth century. It does not specifically identify the name of a river but is the older name for the coastal district of Bundoran.

In March 2026, Bundoran historian Éamon Ó Caoineachán published an interpretation of the record in Donegal Live, associating the historical place-name Doran with the Bundoran district.

His research also referred to the spelling Doorron in early seventeenth-century Tirhugh land records.

== William Allingham and Dooran ==
The historical form Dooran appears in the work of William Allingham (1824–1889), the poet born in nearby Ballyshannon.

Allingham's poem Adieu to Belashanny, also known as The Winding Banks of Erne, was published in his collection Fifty Modern Poems in 1865.

The poem contains the lines:

"From Dooran to the Fairy Bridge, and round by Tullen strand"

In the following stanza, Allingham refers directly to Bundoran:

"Farewell, Coolmore—Bundoran!"

These references place Dooran within Allingham's description of the southern Donegal coastline, including the Fairy Bridges and Tullan Strand.

The poem is evidence for the use of Dooran as a geographical name in the nineteenth century. It does not identify a specific river bearing that name.

== Identification with the Bradoge River ==
The Bradoge River, also written Bradóg or Bradogue, is a river flowing through Bundoran into Donegal Bay.

A local place-name account preserved in the Irish Folklore Commission's Schools' Collection identifies Doran as the supposed ancient name of the Bradoge.

The account, recorded at Carricknahorna in County Donegal, explains Bundoran as the mouth of Doran or Dobhar and associates the old name with the Bradoge.

The association is relevant to the history of Bundoran because the older village was situated west of the bridge over the Bradoge River, in the district now known as the West End.

The identification of Doran with the Bradoge is therefore preserved in local historical tradition. Nevertheless, the folkloric account itself describes the identification as supposed rather than conclusively established.

== The river at Bundoran Main Beach ==
Bundoran has more than one watercourse entering Donegal Bay, a distinction relevant to the geographical interpretation of the historical name Doran.

The Office of Public Works commissioned the North Western–Neagh Bann Catchment Flood Risk Assessment and Management Study, which examined the watercourses affecting Bundoran.

The study's hydrology and hydraulics reports distinguish two separate rivers or streams within Bundoran.

=== Drumacrin watercourse ===
The smaller watercourse also called the Doran River flows through the townland of Drumacrin, passing through northern Bundoran before entering Donegal Bay at Bundoran Strand, the location of the town's Main Beach.

The official study identifies its drainage catchment as approximately 1.9 square kilometres.

Other Office of Public Works flood-risk documents refer to this watercourse as the Drumacrin River.

=== Bradoge River ===
The same report identifies the Bradoge as the larger watercourse, with a drainage catchment of approximately 36 square kilometres at its mouth in Bundoran.

The two watercourses are separately identified in the official hydrological research.

== Doran and the development of Bundoran ==
The history of the place-name Doran is connected with the changing geography and settlement pattern of Bundoran.

This development provides historical context for the location of the older village and the interpretation of its river-derived name.

== Survival of the name ==
The name Doran has continued to appear in modern Bundoran.

In his 2026 historical article, Éamon Ó Caoineachán referred to Doran Close in Drumacrin as a surviving use of the historical name.

Doran Park is also marked on modern Bundoran visitor maps.

These names preserve the form Doran in Bundoran's contemporary local geography.

== Historical significance ==
The name Doran has been discussed in several distinct types of historical source.

The 1603 record concerning Lughaidh Ó Cléirigh establishes its use as a place-name during the early seventeenth century.

William Allingham's poetry provides nineteenth-century literary evidence for the form Dooran.

Patrick Weston Joyce's place-name research provides a nineteenth-century linguistic explanation connecting Bundoran with a river formerly called Doran.

The Schools' Collection preserves a local tradition associating the name with the Bradoge River.

Together, these sources document the historical significance of the name Doran as the older name for the coastal district of Bundoran.

== See also ==
- Bundoran
- County Donegal
- William Allingham
- Lughaidh Ó Cléirigh
- Patrick Weston Joyce
- Irish place-names
- Donegal Bay
- River Erne
