= Louvain Papers, 1606–1827 =

Collection of records of Irish Franciscans at Louvain

- Editor: Brendan Jennings
- Subject: Irish Franciscan history
- Publisher: Irish Manuscripts Commission
- Publication date: 1953

Louvain Papers, 1606–1827 is an edited collection of seventeenth- to nineteenth-century administrative, financial, and correspondence records relating to the Irish Franciscan College of St Anthony at Leuven, in the Spanish Netherlands. Edited by Brendan Jennings and published by the Irish Manuscripts Commission, the papers document the activities of Irish Franciscan friars both in exile and in Ireland during the post-Reformation period.

The collection is regarded as an important primary source for the study of Irish Catholic institutions following the suppression and destruction of monasteries in the late sixteenth and early seventeenth centuries.

== Bundrowes friary record ==
Among the documents is a seventeenth-century entry referring to a Franciscan convent at Bundrowes (also rendered Bundrowis), which records funds sent from that house to the Irish Franciscan authorities at Louvain.

Historians identify Bundrowes as a refuge settlement of the Franciscans of Donegal following the destruction of Donegal Abbey in 1601 during the Nine Years' War. The site is located in the Magheracar area of present-day Bundoran, County Donegal, near the River Drowes.

== Connection to Mícheál Ó Cléirigh ==
Franciscan records indicate that the historian and friar Mícheál Ó Cléirigh resided at the Franciscan convent of Donegal at Bundrowes during the 1630s while collecting historical materials throughout Ireland.

Modern scholarship regards Bundrowes as Ó Cléirigh's principal base in Ireland during this period.

== Role in the Annals of the Four Masters ==
Between 1632 and 1636, Ó Cléirigh and his collaborators compiled the Annals of the Kingdom of Ireland (commonly known as the Annals of the Four Masters). Historical research indicates that the work was carried out at the Franciscan house of refuge at Bundrowes rather than at the destroyed monastery at Donegal Town.

The Bundrowes convent functioned as the displaced community of Donegal Abbey and provided accommodation and institutional support for the scholarly project.

== Historical context ==
Following the defeat of Gaelic Ireland and the consolidation of English rule, many religious communities operated in remote or semi-clandestine locations. The Bundrowes settlement formed part of a wider network of Franciscan refuges that preserved ecclesiastical learning, manuscript culture, and historical scholarship.

The Louvain Papers provide documentary evidence of the connections between these Irish communities and continental Franciscan institutions.

== Modern recognition ==
The historical importance of Bundrowes as a Franciscan refuge associated with Mícheál Ó Cléirigh has been highlighted in commemorations marking the four-hundredth anniversary of his return to Ireland in 1626. Donegal historian Éamon Ó Caoineachán has drawn attention to documentary evidence from the Louvain Papers identifying Bundrowes as a functioning Franciscan convent during the early seventeenth century.

The article notes that Ó Cléirigh was sent from Louvain to the Convent of the Friars of Donegal at Bundrowes to collect Irish historical materials, work that contributed to the later compilation of the Annals of the Four Masters.

== Significance ==
The Louvain Papers are regarded as an important source for understanding:

- the continued operation of the Franciscan Order in Ireland during the early seventeenth century
- the existence of the Bundrowes refuge community
- the activities of Mícheál Ó Cléirigh and his associates
- the institutional context of the compilation of the Annals of the Four Masters

== See also ==
- Annals of the Four Masters
- Mícheál Ó Cléirigh
- Donegal Abbey
