= Roderick O'Flaherty =

Irish historian (1629–1716/18)

Roderick O'Flaherty (Irish: Ruaidhrí Ó Flaithbheartaigh; 1629–1718 or 1716) was an Irish historian.

== Biography ==
He was born in County Galway and inherited Moycullen Castle and estate.

O'Flaherty was the last de jure Lord of Iar Connacht, and the last recognised Chief of the Name of Clan O'Flaherty. He lost the greater part of his ancestral estates to Cromwellian confiscations in the 1650s. The remainder was stolen through deception, by his son's Anglo-Irish father-in-law, Richard "Nimble Dick" Martin of Ross. As Martin had given service to some captured Williamite officers, he was allowed to keep his lands. It was therefore arranged that to protect from confiscation, 200,000 acres of Connemara lands held by O'Flahertys, Joyces, Lees, and others were transferred into Martin's name with the trust that they would be returned. However, Martin betrayed his former friends and neighbours and kept all of their lands.

Uniquely among the O'Flaherty family up to that time, Roderick became a highly regarded historian and collector of Irish manuscripts. His friends and associates included his teacher Dubhaltach MacFhirbhisigh; Daibhidh Ó Duibhgheannáin; John Lynch; Edward Lluyd; Samuel Moleneaux and his father William. O'Flaherty's published works included Ogygia and Iar Connacht.

He is often associated with his elaborate history of Ireland, Ogygia, published in 1685 as Ogygia: Seu Rerum Hibernicarum Chronologia & etc., in 1793 translated into English by Rev. James Hely under the full title Ogygia, or a Chronological Account of Irish Events (Collected from Very Ancient Documents Faithfully Compared with Each Other & Supported by the Genealogical & Chronological Aid of the Sacred and Profane Writings of the Globe).

Ogygia is the island of Calypso, used by O'Flaherty as an allegory for Ireland. Drawing from numerous ancient documents, Ogygia traces Irish history back to the ages of mythology and legend, before the 1st century. The book credits Milesius as the progenitor of the Goidelic people. O'Flaherty had included in his history what purported to be an essay on the understanding of the ancient Ogham alphabet. Based on the 1390 Auraicept na n-Éces, he stated that each letter was named after a tree, a concept widely accepted in 17th-century Ireland.

Ogygia was immediately criticised for its scholarship by George Mackenzie of Rosehaugh (1636–91), Dean of Faculty (1682) at Aberdeen. The arguments about O'Flaherty's work continued well into the 18th century, culminating in the 1775 The Ogygia Vindicated by the historian Charles O'Conor, in which he adds explanatory footnotes to the original work.

Thomas Molyneux visited O'Flaherty on 21 April 1709 and left the following eyewitness account:

I went to vizit old Flaherty, who lives, very old, in a miserable condition at Park, some 3 hours west of Gallway, in Hiar or West-Connaught. I expected to have seen here some old Irish manuscripts, but his ill fortune has stripp'd him of these as well as his other goods, so that he has nothing now left but some few of his own writing, and a few old rummish books of history printed. In my life I never saw so strangely stony and wild a country. I did not see all this way 3 living creatures, not one house or ditch, not one bit of corn, nor even, I might say, a bit of land, for stones: in short nothing appear'd but stones and sea, nor could I conceive an inhabited country so destitute of all signs of people and art as this is.

O'Flaherty died in poverty at Páirc, near Spiddal. He was survived by his daughters, and a son, Micheal Ó Flaithbheartaigh.

== See also ==
- Tadhg Og Ó Cianáin
- Peregrine Ó Duibhgeannain
- Lughaidh Ó Cléirigh
- Mícheál Ó Cléirigh
- James Ussher
- Sir James Ware
- Mary Bonaventure Browne
- Dubhaltach Mac Fhirbhisigh
- Uilliam Ó Duinnín
- Charles O'Conor (historian)
- Eugene O'Curry
- John O'Donovan (scholar)
