= Louis Cullen =

Irish diplomat (born 1932)

Louis Michael Cullen (born 1932) is an Irish diplomat, academic, historian, author and Japanologist. He is Professor of Modern Irish History at Trinity College in Dublin. Nicholas Canny has described him as "the most prolific, most wide-ranging, and the most enterprising historian of his generation in Ireland."

== Early life ==
Cullen's family came from New Ross in County Wexford. He took a master's degree at University College Galway with a thesis on smuggling in 18th century Galway, where he was also the auditor of the History Society in 1953/54. Then he took a doctorate at the London School of Economics.

== Career ==
Cullen was posted to the Irish embassy in Paris as a diplomat, and he developed an interest in the former trading links between Ireland and France.

In 1963, he joined the history department at Trinity College as a lecturer. He was made a Fellow in 1968. In 1972, he was appointed professor of Irish History. In 1970 he was a co-founder of the Economic and Social History Society of Ireland. He was later a Senior Fellow. A speaker of Japanese, he has also written a history of Japan between 1582 and 1941. His book "An Economic History of Ireland Since 1660" has been reprinted and used widely as a textbook for students of Irish history.

Cullen's close study of economic trends has led to a more nuanced understanding of aspects of Irish life in 1700–1850. A traditional view had been that the economic decline of Dublin from 1801 was linked to the 1800 Act of Union with Britain, and the loss of the Parliament of Ireland and local political control. Cullen considered that the decline was inevitable, given the new steam-powered Industrial Revolution, and would have happened even if no union had occurred, and if Grattan's Parliament had managed to secure a high level of Irish autonomy.

== Selected works ==
In an overview of writings by and about Cullen, OCLC/WorldCat lists roughly 70+ works in 150+ publications in 7 languages and 4,600+ library holdings.

This list is not finished; you can help Wikipedia by adding to it.

- Anglo-Irish Trade 1600-1800, 1968
- The Formation of the Irish Economy, 1969
- An Economic History of Ireland Since 1660, 1972
- Négoce et industrie en France et en Irlande aux XVIIIe et XIXe siècles: actes du Colloque franco-irlandais d'histoire, Bordeaux, mai, 1978, 1980
- The Emergence of Modern Ireland 1600-1900, 1981
- The Hidden Ireland: Reassessment of a Concept, 1988
- Culture et pratiques politiques en France et en Irlande XVIe-XVIIIe siècle: actes colloque de Marseille 28 septembre-2 octobre 1988, 1990
- Edmund Burke and Trinity College: lifetime ties and later commemoration 1997
- A History of Japan 1582-1941: Internal and External Worlds, 2003
- "Japan in a changing Asia:achievements and opportuities missed", in: ¿Qué es Japón? Introducción a la cultura japonesa/coord. por Fernando Cid Lucas, Cáceres, Servicio de Publicaciones de la Universidad de Extremadura, 2009, ISBN 9788477238850, pp. 237-254.

== See also ==
- List of Irish historians
