= In Search of Ancient Ireland =

- Genre: History documentary
- Written by: Leo Eaton
- Directed by: Leo Eaton
- Narrated by: Gerard McSorley
- Composer: Mícheál Ó Súilleabháin
- Countries of origin: United States; Ireland
- Original language: English
- No. of episodes: 3

Production
- Executive producers: Kevin Dawson; William R. Grant; James Mitchell; André Singer
- Producers: Leo Eaton; Lesley McKimm
- Production location: Ireland
- Running time: 162 minutes
- Production companies: WNET; Raidió Teilifís Éireann

Original release
- Network: PBS
- Release: 2002

In Search of Ancient Ireland is a 2002 Irish/American three-part television documentary about the history of Ireland from Neolithic times to the English invasion of the 12th century. It is a WNET/Raidió Teilifís Éireann production. Historian of Ireland Carmel McCaffrey was the series historical consultant and co-author of the book of the same title.

== Episodes ==
- Episode 1, “Heroes”: The historicity of the legends of mighty warriors like Cú Chulainn and immortal rulers like Queen Maeve is examined, along with the question “Are the Irish even Celtic?”, which archeologists question. Vast burial mounds dot Ireland's verdant landscape and a climatic Bronze Age disaster changed Ireland forever. The ensuing era of prosperity transformed Ireland into Europe's richest nation, while Rome influenced Ireland before the founding of a new kingdom in Scotland by Irish warlords who would ultimately take over the entire country.
- Episode 2, “Saints”: Christianity arose in Ireland between the 5th and 9th centuries A.D. Missionaries spread that faith, creating compelling and powerful scholarship, theology, and art. Their efforts illuminated the Dark Ages that plagued Europe after the fall of the Roman Empire. The transition from paganism to Christianity is examined along with its ramifications. The power of writing allowed the Catholic Church to control history in its zeal to transform the pagan Irish.
- Episode 3, “Warlords”: Centuries of war, including that perpetuated by the power-hungry Vikings, led up to the Norman invasion of Ireland (1169 AD). Irish kings were preoccupied with their own dynastic battles, notably the reign and murder of the high king Brian Boru (ca. 941– 1014). Rome waged a campaign to stamp out corrupt practices within the Celtic Church. After 150 years of rivalry among various factions seeking control of Ireland came the arrival of England's King Henry II in 1171 AD, a great historical and social watershed as the English throne claimed supremacy over Ireland and the Irish – its repercussions continue today.
