= Uilliam Ó Duinnín =

Irish scribe

Uilliam Ó Duinnín (fl. 1670–1682) was an Irish scribe.

The son of Domhnall Óg Ó Duinnín, Uilliam was the owner of MS 1336, which he may have sold to Edward Lhuyd. He transcribed William Bedell's Irish Old Testament, which was published in 1685.

== See also ==
- Tadhg Og Ó Cianáin
- Peregrine Ó Duibhgeannáin
- Lughaidh Ó Cléirigh
- Mícheál Ó Cléirigh
- Mary Bonaventure Browne
- Dubhaltach Mac Fhirbhisigh
- Ruaidhrí Ó Flaithbheartaigh
- Seán Ó Catháin

== Sources ==
- The Manuscript Collection of Dubhaltach MacFhirbhisigh, William O'Sullivan, p. 339–347, in Seanchas: Studies in Early and Medieval Irish Archaeology, History and Literature in Honour of Francis J. Byrne, edited by Alfred P. Smyth. Dublin, Four Courts, 1999. ISBN 978-1-85182-489-2
