= Mary Bonaventure Browne =

Mother Mary Bonaventure Browne (born after 1610, died after 1670) was a Poor Clare nun, abbess, and Irish historian.

== Background ==
A daughter of Andrew Browne fitz Oliver, a wealthy merchant and a member of The Tribes of Galway. She was a niece of Martin Browne, whose townhouse doorway, the Browne doorway, now stands in Eyre Square. Andrew was a first cousin of Sir Dominick Browne, former Mayor of Galway and the father of Valentine Browne, OFM, Provincial of Franciscans 1629–1635. Her elder brother, Francis, later joined the Franciscans, while Mary and her sister Catherine joined the Poor Clares in 1632. In that year, her father, Andrew, was elected one of the town sheriffs but refused to take the Oath of Supremacy, as had his father in 1609, and thus was not sworn in.

== The Poor Clares ==
Following their banishment from Dublin in November 1630, the Poor Clares removed to Bethleham, in what was then the townland of Bleanphuttogue, parish of Kilkenny West, County Westmeath, a remote area on the shores of Lough Ree some eight miles (13 km) north-west of Athlone and four and a half miles southwest of Ballymahon, County Longford. Within a few years, there were sixty members.

Following a request from some citizens of Galway, twelve sisters and two novices moved there during or immediately after January 1642. Mary and Catherine, who were professed at Bethlehem in 1633, were among the group. The Abbess at Bethleham was Mother Cicely Dillon, a sister of Sir James Dillon (officer) and both children of Theobald Dillon, 1st Viscount Dillon. At Galway, the Abbess was, successively, Mary Gabriel Martyn, Mary Clare Kennedy, and Mary during 1647–50, being succeeded by her sister Catherine. The convent was located in or near what is now St. Augustine Street.

== Abbess in Galway ==
In her first year, Mary commissioned Dubhaltach Mac Fhirbhisigh to complete the work of translating The Rule of St. Clare and related documents into Irish. This had been begun prior to October 1636 by Father Aodh O Raghailligh and Séamus Ó Siaghail. It was transcribed in mid-October 1636 by Brother Mícheál Ó Cléirigh. Mac Fhirbhisigh translated and transcribed the remaining sections (some two-thirds of the total) from English into Irish and "designed it to be a continuation of the manuscript executed by Ó Cléirigh". It was completed on 8 December 1657, and is now Royal Irish Academy MS D i 2.

Helena Concannon remarks that "It is additional proof of Mother Bonaventure's keen interest in Irish to find that she had brought this MS with her from Bethleham". The fact that she commissioned Mac Fhirbhisigh to complete the work is a very interesting marker of the high status of the Irish language, all the more surprising in a convent twelve of whose members were of Old English stock.

While Abbess, Mother Mary oversaw plans for founding a daughter-house of the Galway convent at Loughrea. The foundation document, now preserved in the Poor Clare archives in Galway, led to the house's apparent existence in 1649–50, but due to the warfare which soon arose in the county seems to have been short-lived.

In the summer of 1649, Mother Mary sent a petition to the "Mayors, Sheriffs, Free Burgesses and Commonalty of the Towne of Galway" stating that, due to excessive rent, they would be obliged to leave their current home at the end of the lease, which occurred the following May. Therefore, she petitioned that "you may be pleased to grant them sufficient room for building a monastery and rooms convenient thereunto a garden and orchard in the next island adjoining to the bridge Illaun Altenagh." The Mayor and Recorder recommended the grant on 1 July, and on 10 July the Corporation unanimously agreed and granted the petition. The convent on Oileán Ealtanach - now called Nun's Island - was "a good large and spacious house with other conveniences with the cost and charge of two hundred and odd pounds of the Sisters' portions in timber and other materials".

== Exile ==
Though at least one new sister was professed as late as 1652, the years during and after the move to Nun's Island were marked by a visitation of plague, a nine-month siege, warfare and famine. Galway surrendered to Sir Charles Coote and his army in April 1652, marking the advent of a very different regime. In January 1653, an edict "commanding all nuns of whatsoever condition, to marry or quit the kingdom." Most of the Galway community travelled by ship to Spain; Mother Cicely Dillon died en route. Mary's sister, Mother Catherine Bernard Browne, died in Madrid in 1654.

== Work as a historian ==
During her years of exile in Madrid, Mother Mary wrote "a huge work, in quarto, in the Irish language." Written c. 1670 at the convent of El Cavallero de Garcia, "it is particularly regrettable that the original of the great work is no longer extant, since a prose work in Irish by a pre-twentieth-century female author would be a very rare thing indeed."

While almost the entire record of El Cavallero de Garcia, including this book, is now thought to be lost, there is a strong suggestion that the narrative which opens the annals of the Poor Clares of Galway could be an English translation of the second tracta of her book. Mother Mary's work comprised the following:

- I - Historical disquisition concerning haeresiarchs and the persecutions for which they are responsible.
- II - The Martyrdom of certain Poor Clares and Tertiaries during the reign of terror in Ireland.
- III - The Life of Henry VIII.
- IV - The Life of Anne Boleyn.
- V - The Life of Queen Catherine.
- VI - the Acts of Saint Colette.
- VII - The Life of Blessed Margaret del Pilar, Poor Clare.
- VIII - The Life of the Saintly Queen of Sicily.
- IX - Historical Tract concerning various people who lived devout lives in the world.
- X - Concerning the Devotion of the Rosary and its origin.
- XI - Concerning other Rosaries granted by the bounty of God to those devout to him.

Celsus O'Brien quotes the Poor Clare Annalist: "The Third Abbess of said Convent, Mary Bonaventure (alias) Browne, was a very good, holy and perfect religious Sister, and was endowed with many rare virtues, as obedience, poverty, chastity, humility and charity. She was prudent and wise, well spoken in English, Irish and Spanish. She was the mirror and looking glass of religious observance that belonged to her Rule and status all of her lifetime. She left a True Chronicle written under her own hand, which she sent to this convent of Saint Clare, Galway, and a Remonstrance, a chalice, a holy, curious relic, many pictures, books, ornaments, and other fine things fitting for the altar and Divine Service. All the aforesaid things were lost and burnt in the late wars, 1691."

In addition, she is said to have written a life, in English, of her sister, Catherine Browne. The dowry of Catherine - "due by bond of Andrew Browne and Sir Dominick Browne, knight, was put in trust for them in the names of Patrick D'Arcy and Richard Óge Martyn, Esq." Sir Dominick's wife was a sister of Darcy, while he and Richard Martyn were married to two of the sisters and heiresses, Mary and Magdalene, who were daughters of Sir Peter French.

Her year of death is unknown, but she is believed to have been after 1670 and before 1691.

Preceded by Mary Clare Kennedy	Abbess of the Poor Clares of Galway; 1647–1650	Succeeded by Catherine Browne

== See also ==
- Tadhg Og Ó Cianáin
- Peregrine Ó Duibhgeannain
- Lughaidh Ó Cléirigh
- Mícheál Ó Cléirigh
- James Ussher
- Sir James Ware
- Dubhaltach Mac Fhirbhisigh
- Ruaidhrí Ó Flaithbheartaigh
- Uilliam Ó Duinnín
- Charles O'Conor (historian)
- Eugene O'Curry
- John O'Donovan (scholar)

== Sources ==
- Historic Galway Convents. I. The Poor Clares, Studies, xxviii (1949), pp. 439–46, Helena Concannon
- Poor Clares, Galway, 1642-1992, by Celsus O'Brien, 1992
- Aspects Intellectual Life in Seventeenth Century Galway, Nollaig Ó Muraíle, in Galway:History and Society, ed. Gerard Moran and Raymond Gillespie, pp. 149–211, 1996. ISBN 0-906602-75-0.
- Martyn, Adrian (2016). The Tribes of Galway:1124-1642
