= Thomas Bartlett (historian) =

Irish historian (born 1948)

- Born: Thomas Bartlett; 1948 (age 77–78); Belfast, Northern Ireland, United Kingdom

Academic background
- Education: Queen's University Belfast
- Thesis: The Townshend Viceroyalty 1767-1772 (1976)

Academic work
- Discipline: History
- Sub-discipline: Irish history
- Institutions: National University of Ireland, Galway; University College Dublin; University of Aberdeen

Thomas Bartlett MRIA is an Irish historian and author. He was born in 1948 in Belfast located in Northern Ireland.

== Biography ==
Bartlett was born in Belfast and attended St. Mary's Christian Brothers' Grammar School. He read history at Queen's University Belfast, taking a BA in 1970 and his doctorate in 1976 on Townshend's viceroyalty in 1767–72.

He was appointed Lecturer in Irish History at National University of Ireland, Galway. In 1995 he was appointed professor of history at University College Dublin and subsequently moved to the chair in Irish History at the University of Aberdeen.

He was elected a member of the Royal Irish Academy in 1995 and has held several visiting professorships in the US and Britain.

In 1999 he was appointed the first Naughton Fellow in Irish Studies at the University of Notre Dame.

He is currently emeritus Professor at the University of Aberdeen.

== Partial bibliography ==
- Penal Era and Golden Age: Essays in Irish History, 1690-1800 (Belfast, 1979)
- (as co-editor) Irish Studies: A General Introduction (Dublin, 1988).
- The Fall and Rise of the Irish Nation: the Catholic Question, 1690-1830 (Gill and Macmillan, 1992)
- (editor) A Military History of Ireland (Cambridge, 1996)
- Theobald Wolfe Tone (Dundalk, 1998), pp. 89
- (co-author) The Irish Rebellion of 1798: a Bicentenary perspective (Dublin, 2003)
- (editor) Revolutionary Dublin: the letters of Francis Higgins to Dublin Castle, 1795-1801 (Dublin, 2003)
- Ireland: A History (Cambridge University Press 2010)
- (Editor) The Irish Soldier ( Four Courts Press 2026)
