= Abby Martin (disambiguation) =

Abby Martin is an American journalist and presenter of The Empire Files.

Abby Martin or Abigail Martin may also refer to:

- Abigail Martin (gymnast) (born 2008), British artistic gymnast
- Abby Martin, character in literary output of American writer Sarah Orne Jewett
- Abigail Martin, American author and academic married to author Jerry L. Martin

== See also ==
- Abbé Martin (disambiguation)
- Abe Martin (disambiguation)
