= Boetius Egan =

Boetius Egan may refer to:

- Boetius Egan (archbishop of Tuam) (1734–1798), Irish Roman Catholic prelate
- Boetius Egan (bishop of Elphin) (died 1650), Irish Roman Catholic prelate

== See also ==
- Boetius MacEgan (died 1650), Roman Catholic bishop of Ross, Ireland
