= Daibhidh Ó Duibhgheannáin =

Dáibhídh Ó Duibhgeannáin (fl. 1651–1696), also known as Dáibhídh mac Matthew Glas Ó Duibhgeannáin or Dáibhídh Bacach ("lame David"), was a scribe, compiler and poet who was active between the years 1651 and 1696. In the earliest of his known works, Royal Irish Academy Ms. 24.P.9., he writes on page 238: "sguirim go ttrasada ar Loch Mesg dam a ttigh Thaidgh Oig Ui Fhlaibhertaigh 1 die Aprilis 1651, Dauid Duigenan qui scripsit/I stop now, and I on Loch Mask in the house of Tadhg Og O Flaherty, April 1st, 1651, David Duigenan who wrote this." A later entry specifies the place as Oileán Ruadh, or Red Island.

There is a slight chance that he may have been the (or an) intermediary responsible for presenting Dubhaltach MacFhirbhisigh with "Volume C" of the original four volumes of the autograph of the Annals of the Four Masters, covering the period AM 2242 to AD 1171. Peregrine O'Duignan, one of the four main responsible for compiling the book, was a kinsman of Dáibhídh's. However, an idea proposed by the writer of this article that Dáibhídh was MacFhirbhisigh's mysterious amanuensis cannot be sustained, as a comparison of their handwriting bears no resemblance to each other.

Throughout his life, he transcribed such works as "Suibhne Gelt/The Frenzy of Sweeney", "The Adventures of the Two Idiot Saints", "The Battle of Magh Rath", and "The Banquet of Dun na Gedh.". He is believed to have lived his final years in Shancough, Tirerrill, County Sligo, where he lived with his wife, a Mac Con Midhe. He died in 1696.

== See also ==
- List of Irish historians
- Clan O Duibhgeannain
