= Owen Connellan =

Translator

- Born: 1797; County Sligo, Ireland
- Died: 4 August 1871 (aged 73–74); Dublin
- Resting place: Mount Jerome Cemetery
- Occupations: Translator, Professor of Irish
- Employer: Royal Irish Academy
- Known for: Translation of the Annals of the Four Masters into English

Owen Connellan (1797 – 4 August 1871) was an Irish scholar who translated the Annals of the Four Masters into English in 1846.

== Life ==
He was born in County Sligo, the son of a farmer who claimed descent from Lóegaire mac Néill, High King of Ireland in the fifth century. He studied Irish literature and obtained employment as a scribe with the Royal Irish Academy. Over the following twenty years he copied a great part of the Books of Lecan and Ballymote.

When King George IV visited Ireland Connellan translated his "Letter to the Irish people" into Irish, and was appointed Irish historiographer to the king. When Queen's College was opened he was appointed professor of Irish at Cork. Despite some issues with the college president, Robert Kane, he held the chair until 1863. He lived for many years in Dublin and died at his house in Burlington Road in 1871.

His most important work was Imtheacht na Tromdhaimhe, or, The proceedings of the great Bardic Institution, which relates how Senchán Torpéist recovered the Táin Bó Cúailnge, one of the most famous tales of the Irish bards.

== Dispute with Henry Monck Mason ==
In 1830 Henry J. Monck Mason, founder of Irish Society for Promoting the Education of the Native Irish through the Medium of Their Own Language, dedicated to spreading the Scripture in Ireland through the means of the Irish language, published a Grammar of the Irish Language. In the preface of this book he acknowledged that he was not acquainted with Irish as a colloquial but only as a written language. Little notice was taken of the book until he was rash enough to print in the Christian Examiner for September 1833 a long letter on "The Irish Language", ostensibly a critique of Owen Connellan's edition of the Irish prayer-book, but in reality a personal attack upon him and Thady Connellan, a relative. Owen Connellan replied, as far as the editor of the magazine would allow him, in the October number (pp. 729–732). He showed that Mason's Grammar was a mass of errors, and that the pocket edition of Bishop Bedell's Irish Bible, issued by the Irish Society under Mason's supervision, was just as inaccurate. In these strictures Connellan was supported by Dr. Charles Orpen and John O'Donovan. Connellan soon afterwards printed his reply in its unmutilated form as A Dissertation on Irish Grammar, 1834.

== Works ==
- Grammatical Interlineary Version of the Gospel of St. John 1830
- Grammatical Praxis on the Gospel of St. Matthew 1830
- Dissertation on Irish Grammar 1834
- A Practical Grammar of the Irish Language 1844
- Translation of The Annals of Ireland from the Irish of the Four Masters 1846
- Translation of Imtheacht na Tromdhaimhe, or, The proceedings of the great Bardic Institution (1860)

== See also ==
- John O'Donovan
