= James Digman Wingfield =

English painter

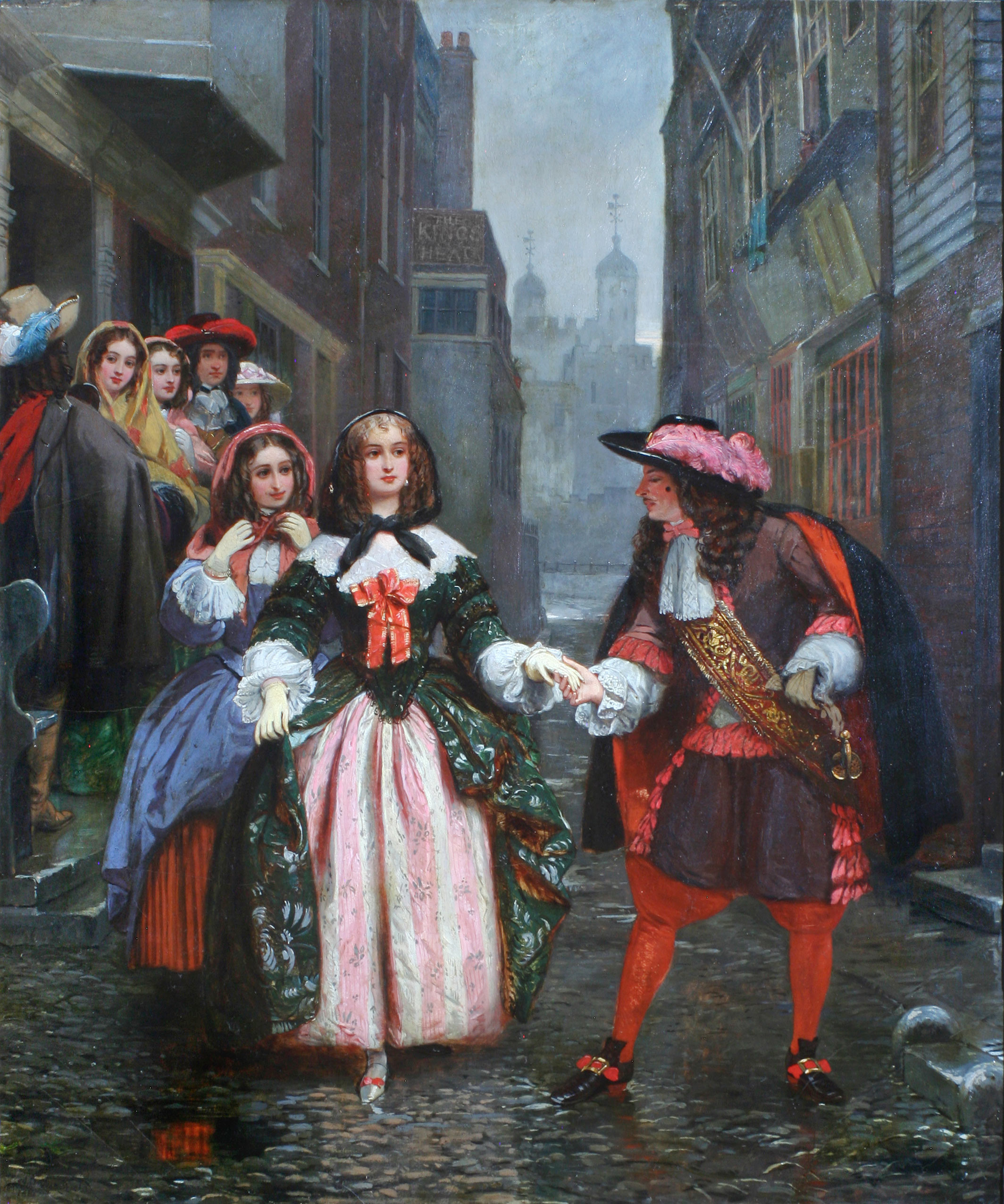
Pepys and Lady Batten. 1861, oil on canvas, 25 × 30 inches. Wingfield's depiction of a faintly scandalous event in the famous Restoration-era diary of Samuel Pepys.

James Digman Wingfield (1812–1872) was a British painter, known mainly for historical subjects, as well as for landscapes, portraits, and interiors.

Wingfield was a member of the Royal Academy, where he displayed a number of portraits in 1835-1836. From then until 1872 he exhibited more than 38 works at the Royal Academy, 94 at the British Institution, and 41 at Suffolk Street Exhibitions (later to become the Royal Society of British Artists). He had a successful career: individual works by Wingfield were priced at around 100 pounds during his lifetime. Wingfield was a resident of London during the period that he was active and scenes of London were featured in his works.

Occasionally his paintings depicted specific incidents in literature or history; Pope was a favorite. In his later years he painted interiors and garden and park scenes, with figures in period costume. His 1849 painting of the Schönheitsgalerie, or female portrait gallery, in Hampton Court was especially well received. The painting was used for the cover of a recent (2005) historical work, Tudor and Stuart Britain, 1485–1714, by Roger Lockyer.

Wingfield died in the spring of 1872; his works were sold by Christie's in July 1872.
