= Cú Choigríche Ó Duibhgeannáin =

Irish historian and chronicler

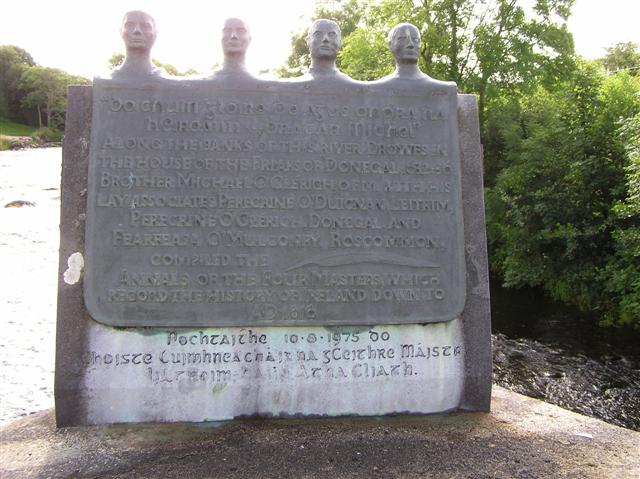
- Monument to the Four Masters, located at the bridge over the Drowes River near Kinlough, near Ó Duibhgeannáin's homeland
- Born: Cú Coigriche mac Tuathal Ó Duibhgeannáin
- Occupation: Historian
- Known for: Annals of the Four Masters

Cú Choigríche Ó Duibhgeannáin (fl. 1627–1636), anglicised Peregrine O'Duignan, was an Irish historian and chronicler.

He is best known for being one of the "Four Masters" - the authors of the historical chronicle Annals of the Four Masters.

== Name ==
Cú Coigriche (also Cuchogry) means "hound [or hero] of the neighbouring [or foreign] land." Upon taking holy orders in the Franciscan Order of Leuven, his name was Latinised to Pereginus.

== Early life ==
Ó Duibhgeannáin was born about or after 1590. His father was Tuathal Buidhe Ó Duibhgeannáin, of Castlefore, County Leitrim.

His family, the clan Uí Dhuibhgeannáin, were professional historians from Annaly, many of whom had crossed the Shannon and practised their art in Connacht. Here the Ó Duibhgeannains set up a bardic college at Kilronan, near Lough Key in northern County Roscommon.

== The "Four Masters" ==
Around 1627, he began working with Cú Choigcríche Ó Cléirigh and Fearfeasa Ó Maol Chonaire under the direction of Brother Mícheál Ó Cléirigh. In that year Ó Cléirigh was sent from his mother house at Leuven to Ireland to collect Irish literary, historical and chronological material in danger of being lost. These materials were assembled into a number of compilations, the most famous being the Annals of the Four Masters.

In 1636, the year Annals was completed, it is likely Ó Duibhgeannáin returned to Leuven with Mícheál Ó Cléirigh. It is possible that he remained in Ireland, as a copy of the annals was being used in the town of Galway by Dubhaltach MacFhirbhisigh in the late 1640s. It may not be coincidental that a kinsman of Ó Duibhgeannáin, Daibhidh Ó Duibhgheannáin ("lame David") was living and working in Connemara at least as early as 1651.

== See also ==
- Tadhg Og Ó Cianáin
- Lughaidh Ó Cléirigh
- Mícheál Ó Cléirigh
- James Ussher
- Sir James Ware
- Mary Bonaventure Browne
- Dubhaltach Mac Fhirbhisigh
- Ruaidhrí Ó Flaithbheartaigh
- Uilliam Ó Duinnín
- Eugene O'Curry
- Ó Duibhgeannáin

== Sources ==
- "The Learned Family of O Duigenan", Fr. Paul Walsh, Irish Ecclesiastical Record, 1921
- "The Four Masters" (I & II, 1932 & 1934), Fr. Paul Walsh, Irish Leaders & Learning Through the Ages, Four Courts Press, Dublin, 2004, ISBN 1-85182-543-6
- O Duibhgeannain, Cu Choigcriche (O'Duigenan, Peregrine), pp. 435–36, Dictionary of Irish Biography from the Earliest Times to the Year 2002, Cambridge, 2010.
