= Carmel McCaffrey =

Carmel McCaffrey was an Irish author of books and lecturer on Irish history, literature, culture, and language at Johns Hopkins University and the Smithsonian Institution. She passed on February 23rd 2026.

== Biography ==
McCaffrey was born in Dublin, Ireland, and teaches Irish history and Irish literature at Johns Hopkins University in Baltimore, Maryland. She is also a frequent lecturer at the Smithsonian Institution in Washington, D.C. She founded and edited the literary review Wild About Wilde (1986–1996) dedicated to the works of the 19th-century Irish writer, Oscar Wilde. She was the series historical consultant for the three part PBS/RTÉ program In Search of Ancient Ireland (2002) and co-author of the book of the same title. This TV series, like the book, presents the history of Ireland from neolithic times to the English invasion of the 12th century. McCaffrey is also the author of the book In Search of Ireland's Heroes: The Story of the Irish from the English Invasion to the Present Day (2006).

McCaffrey is an Irish language speaker and frequently travels to Ireland. She lives in Mount Airy, Maryland.
