= Kathleen Deignan =

Kathleen P. Deignan, C.N.D.
- Born: 17 December 1947 (age 77); London, United Kingdom
- Genres: Celtic; Christian
- Occupation(s): Singer songwriter Religious Sister; Teaching theologian Liturgical musician Religious environmental leader / spiritual animator and guide
- Website: scholaministries.org

Kathleen P. Deignan, CND, (born 17 December 1947), is an Irish-American theologian, spiritual teacher, author, and songwriter of contemporary liturgical and contemplative music. A Sister of the Congregation of Notre Dame, she earned a Bachelors Degree in English Literature from Sacred Heart University, Fairfield CT; a Masters degree in the History of Christian Spirituality and Doctorate in Historical Theology from Fordham University, NY. She was composer-in-residence for Schola Ministries at the former Benedictine Grange for 40 years. Founding director of the Deignan Institute for Earth and Spirit Institute at Iona University (New Rochelle, New York), New York, where she continues to serve as Emerita Professor of Religious Studies.

Deignan previously directed the Iona Institute for Peace and Justice Studies in Ireland and is a visiting lecturer at An Croí Wisdom Institute, Drogheda, Ireland. She is a GreenFaith Fellow who completed an intensive training in religious environmental leadership which she practices in a variety of forums. Her work in this area focuses on the legacy of Father Thomas Berry with whom she studied at Fordham University.

She is Emerita President of the International Thomas Merton Society and a former Board Member of the American Teilhard Association. She is an author, public speaker, and environmental advocate. Her books include ChristSpirit: The Eschatology of Shaker Christianity; When the Trees Say Nothing: Thomas Merton's Writings on Nature; Thomas Merton: A Book of Hours; Teilhard de Chardin: A Book of Hours (co-edited with Libby Osgood, CND); and Thomas Berry: A Book of Hours. She hosts several monthly podcasts for the Deignan Institute for Earth and Spirit: "Becoming Earthling" with Scott Thompson; "Eldering in Grace"; and the Berry Forum Contemplative Circle with Brother Kevin Cawley, CFC. A Retreat facilitator and animator she has presented nationally and internationally on a range of subjects that serve the awakening of an ecozoic spirituality and practice.

Her music is freely available on YouTube at Kathleen Deignan Music (https://www.youtube.com/results?search_query=kathleen+deignan+music)

== Biography ==
Deignan is Emerita Professor of Religious Studies at Iona College, and the founding director of the Kathleen Deignan, CND Institute for Earth and Spirit. She received her master's degree in Spirituality Studies and her doctorate in Historical Theology from Fordham University in New York, where she was to later be awarded the university's Sapientia et Doctrina Award for her service to renewal of the church in 2009. She is the author of Christ Spirit: The Eschatology of Shaker Christianity and writes and lectures widely on classical and contemporary spirituality, particularly the legacy of Thomas Merton. She is the author of When the Trees Say Nothing: Writings on Nature, Thomas Merton: A Book of Hours, and she also released a two-disc CD "A Book of Hours: At Prayer with Thomas Merton".

She has composed over two hundred songs for worship and prayer, and she has been part of two liturgical ensembles. Along with Evelyn Avoglia she founded Schola Ministries a publishing and performing project where she is composer-in-residence. This ministry which began with the worship community at Sacred Heart University, was located at the Benedictine Grange, where she was composer in residence and leader of the ensemble Anima Schola until the closure of Benedictine Grange in 2018. Her music is produced by producer, composer and performer Paul Avgerinos.

As a member of the Congregation of Notre Dame, founded by Saint Marguerite Bourgeoys, she is engaged in the mission of education, which at times is expressed in peace, social justice, and ecological justice concerns. She initiated and formerly directed the Iona College Institute for Peace and Justice Studies in Ireland and the Iona College Spirituality Institute's Celtic Spirituality Pilgrimage to Ireland.

Deignan is also engaged in interfaith dialogue with Jews, Muslims, and Buddhists. Her parents, Patrick Paul and Bridget, were born in Ireland and later emigrated to London where Kathleen was born. Another emigration brought the Deignans to New York City where Kathleen was raised on Manhattan's Upper West Side.

Her sister is Ann Deignan, a physician and poet.

One of Sr. Deignan's edited volumes of Thomas Merton's work was praised by the National Catholic Reporter.

== Discography ==
- 1984 – A Garden Once Again: Songs in Celebration of Creation
- 1984 – Of Thanks and Wonder:
- 1997 – Stations: Songs for the Paschal Journey
- 1998 – Borne by Grace: Songs of Contemplation and Praise
- 1999 – Bride Spirit: Songs of the Beloved
- 1999 – Visitation: Songs of the Congregation of Notre Dame
- 2000 – Pax Amor Christi: A Trinity of Songs
- 2000 – Sabbath: Songs for Worship
- 2002 – The Servant's Heart: Songs of Devotion
- 2003 – Returning: Songs for the Journey Home
- 2005 – Sentinel of the Invisible: Jeanne LeBer
- 2008 – The Gift: Songs of the Grateful Heart
- 2009 – A Book of Hours: At Prayer with Thomas Merton
- 2009 – Ave: Songs of the Congregation of Notre Dame
- 2010 – A Garden Once Again: Songs in Celebration of Creation

== Bibliography ==
- 1992 – Christ Spirit: The Eschatology of Shaker Christianity. ISBN 978-0-8108-2489-8
- 2003 – Thomas Merton, When the Trees Say Nothing: Writings on Nature (edited by Kathleen Deignan). ISBN 978-1-893732-60-5
- 2007 – Thomas Merton: A Book of Hours. ISBN 978-1-933495-05-7
- 2009 – Thomas Merton: El Libro de las Horas. ISBN 978-84-293-1818-0
- 2009 – Thomas Merton: Księga godzin. ISBN 978-83-61568-24-7
