= Mary Gabriel Martyn =

Abess of the Poor Clares in Galway

Maria Gabriel Martyn (1604–1672) was Abbess of the Poor Clares of Galway.

== Background ==
Born Helen Martyn, she was a member of one of The Tribes of Galway, the merchant families who ruled Galway from the late medieval to the early modern era. Her exact relationship to contemporary members of the Martyn family is uncertain; Richard Óge Martyn - father of Oliver Óge Martyn - was of her generation, as perhaps was Walter Óge Martyn (see Dominick Kirwin). An older eccleastical relative was Father Peter Martyn, who was well known as a superb preacher and died in 1645.

== Poor Clare ==
Helen was professed into the Poor Clares in 1632, the same year as the sisters Catherine and Mary Bonaventure Browne. The nuns had been banished from Dublin in November 1630 and resettled at Bethleham, parish of Kilkenny West, County Westmeath. Within a few years there were sixty members, several of whom bore tribal surnames such as Font and Skerrett.

Following a request from some citizens of Galway, twelve sisters and two novices moved there during or immediately after January 1642. The convent was located in or near what is now St. Augustine Street. Maria Gabriel became the first abbess of the convent; in September, her relative Richard Óge Martyn, became Mayor of Galway. Both he and his law partner, Patrick Darcy, were patrons of the order. By then, Galway was at war.

== Exile and return ==
During the Cromwellian occupation of Galway after 1652, the nuns were expelled from Augustine Street, as were Dominicans such as Julia Nolan. While some made a new home across the Corrib on Oileán Altanach, many were forcibly dispersed abroad, mainly to Spain. Maria Gabriel remained in Galway, hiding with friends and relatives, along with a small number of other sisters. Only in the mid-1660s, following The Restoration, were the sisters able to take in more members, including sisters who returned from Spain.

The Galway convent continues to this day, and at least three other members of the Martyn family were sisters or abbess's.

== Tombstone ==
Mother Gabriel was buried in the Franciscan graveyard, just outside the town walls. Her tombstone reads:

1672. Here lieth the Body of the R. Mother Maria Gabriel alias Helen Martin, first Abbess and religious of the poore Clares of Galway, who died the 14 of Jan. adged 68, in religion 40. Pray for her Soule.

Preceded by New creation	Abbess of the Poor Clares of Galway; 1642–?	Succeeded by Mary Clare Kennedy

== See also ==
- The Tribes of Galway
