= Saint Martin's Abbey =

St. Martin's Abbey or the Abbey of Saint Martin or variant may refer to:

- Abbey of Saint-Martin-du-Canigou, in southern France near the Spanish border, built in 1009
- Abbey of Saint-Martin de Laon, a monastery in Laon, France, established in 1124
- Abbey of Saint-Martin de Limoges, a monastery in Limoges, France, established in 1012
- Abbey of Saint-Martin, Pontoise, a monastery in Pontoise, France, established in the 11th century
- Abbey of Saint-Martin, Tournai, a monastery in Tournai, Belgium, originally established in the 7th century
- Abbey of Saint-Martin de Troarn, a monastery in Troarn, France, established in the 11th century
- Ligugé Abbey, otherwise the Abbey of St. Martin, Ligugé, a monastery in Ligugé, France, established in 360
- Weingarten Abbey, otherwise St. Martin's Abbey, a monastery in Weingarten, Germany, established in 1274
- Muri Abbey, otherwise the Abbey of St. Martin, Muri, a monastery in Aargau, Switzerland, established in 1064
- Battle Abbey, otherwise St. Martin's Abbey, a monastery in East Sussex, UK, established in 1094
- Pannonhalma Archabbey, otherwise St. Martin's Abbey, Pannonhalma, a monastery in Pannonhalma, Hungary, founded in 996
- St. Martin's Abbey, Washington, a monastery in Lacey, Washington, USA, founded in 1895
- Monastery of San Martiño Pinario, a monastery in Compostela, Spain, founded in 899
- Abbey of Saint Martin, now the Great St. Martin Church, Cologne, a monastery in Cologne, Germany, founded in 960
- Abbey of Saint Martin, now the Basilica of Saint Martin, Tours, a monastery in Tours, France, founded in c. 372
- Abbey of San Martino in Valle in Abruzzo, Italy
- Abbey of St. Martin (Trier)
