= Boetius Egan (bishop of Elphin) =

Bishop of Elphin (died 1650)

Styles of Boetius Egan, O.F.M.
- Reference style: The Right Reverend
- Spoken style: My Lord or Bishop

Boetius Egan (Irish: Baothnalach Mac Aodhagáin; died 1650) was an Irish clergyman who served as the Roman Catholic Bishop of Elphin from 1625 to 1650.

A Franciscan friar, Egan was appointed the bishop of the Diocese of Elphin by the Holy See on 9 June 1625 and consecrated the following year. After serving the see for nearly twenty-five years, he died in office on 19 April 1650.

== See also ==
- Egan (surname)
- Mac Aodhagáin

Catholic Church titles
Preceded by Raymund Galvin	Bishop of Elphin; 1625–1650	Succeeded by See vacant followed by Dominic de Burgo
