= Dubhaltach Mac Fhirbhisigh =

Irish scribe, translator, historian and genealogist

Dubhaltach Mac Fhirbhisigh (Irish pronunciation: [ˈd̪ˠuːl̪ˠt̪ˠəx mˠək ˈɪɾʲəvʲɪʃiː]), also known as Dubhaltach Óg mac Giolla Íosa Mór mac Dubhaltach Mór Mac Fhirbhisigh, Duald Mac Firbis, Dudly Ferbisie, and Dualdus Firbissius (fl. 1643 – January 1671) was an Irish scribe, translator, historian and genealogist. He was one of the last traditionally trained Irish Gaelic scholars, and was a member of the Clan MacFhirbhisigh, a leading family of northern Connacht. His best-known work is the Leabhar na nGenealach, which was published in 2004 as The Great Book of Irish Genealogies, also known as The Great Book of Irish Genealogies. This was published in 2004 by Éamonn de Búrca, more than 300 years after it had been written.

== Family and education ==
Mac Fhirbhisigh was most likely born at the family castle, in the parish of Lackan, Tireragh, County Sligo, sometime in the first quarter of the 17th century. He was originally known as Dubhaltach Og ("young Dubhaltach") to distinguish him from his grandfather, Dubhaltach Mór ("big Dubhaltach").

He was the eldest of four sons born to Giolla Íosa Mór Mac Fhirbhisigh and an unnamed daughter of Eoghan Gruamadha Mac Diarmada of the Sliocht Cormaic Oig Mac Diarmada of Tireragh. It is unknown whether he himself had ever married or had children. On page nine of his Introduction to The Great Book of Irish Genealogies, Nollaig Ó Muraíle writes:

"It is ironic that someone who has furnished us with so much information about others has left us very few details about his own life; for example, we know nothing of his personal appearance, his marital status, or, indeed, extensive portions of his life."

It is possible that he had received some sort of formal education in Galway, studying English, Latin and some Greek. This is implied by his use of all three languages in his works. There is also the possibility that he received additional training at the Mac Aodhagáin bardic school located at Ballymacegan, Lough Derg, County Tipperary, which was run by noted scholar, Flann Mac Aodhagáin.

Mac Fhirbhisigh's friends and acquaintances included John Lynch, Patrick D'Arcy, Mary Bonaventure Browne, Sir James Ware, Eoin Ó Gnímh and Ruaidhrí Ó Flaithbheartaigh. His contemporaries include Peregrine O'Duignan, Mícheál Ó Cléirigh, Richard Martyn, Daibhidh Ó Duibhgheannáin, and Randal MacDonnell, 1st Marquess of Antrim.

Mac Fhirbhisigh's career as a scholar overlapped with a devastating period of war, famine, and plague in Ireland (the Irish Confederate Wars of 1641–1653), but curiously, he never mentions contemporary politics or events in his works.

== Emergence in 1643 ==
The first certain date that can be associated with Dubhaltach is 5 May 1643, when he was situated at Ballymacegan translating the ancient glossary Duil Laithne ("the book of Latin"). In that year, he transcribed from an old Mac Aodhagan manuscript what is now known as the Fragmentary Annals of Ireland; according to a Latin note prefixed to the manuscript, it was made for Rev. Dr. John Lynch, then Archdeacon of Tuam.

It may also have been in 1643 that he transcribed Beatha Neimheadh Deidheanach (a legal tract) and the Chronicon Scotorum. Both of these may have been further copies made by Mac Fhirbhisigh at the behest of John Lynch.

=== Seanchas Síl Ír ===
At some point between 1643 and early 1645, Dubhaltach moved to the town of Galway. In April 1645, he completed a transcription of the seventy-page historical-genealogical compilation called Seanchas Síl Ír. His source can be shown to be the late 14th-century manuscript called The Book of Uí Mhaine (also known as the Book of Ó Dubhagáin). Dubhaltach's very faithful transcript is especially valuable as four of the original fourteen folios have since been lost.

=== Work for the Poor Clares ===
On 8 December 1647, Dubhaltach noted that he had completed the translation - from English into Irish - of part of one book and all of a second concerning the Rule of St. Clare, and related matters. This translation was commissioned by Mother Mary Bonaventure Browne, Abbess of the Order of the Poor Clares in Galway. The initial section had been copied by Brother Mícheál Ó Cléirigh in 1636, and it was left to Mac Fhirbhisigh to complete it. He states in a note that his place of writing was the "College of Galway", most probably the college-house of the Collegiate Church of St. Nicholas, Galway. The college house was demolished in 1836, though the church itself is still in regular use. The Poor Clares are now based on Nun's Island in Galway city centre.

=== Leabhar na nGenealach ===
In April 1649, Mac Fhirbhisigh was working on what would come to be considered his magnum opus, Leabhar na nGenealach, or the Book of Genealogies. Nollaig Ó Muraíle describes it as "a compilation of Irish genealogical lore relating to the principal Gaelic and Anglo-Norman families of Ireland and covering the period from pre-Christian times to the mid-17th century and collected from a variety of sources."

It is not known how long Dubhaltach spent collecting the necessary materials and planning the book's layout. Nor is it known when he commenced writing; he does note that on the "13 April, in Galway, 1649", he had completed a fifty-page tract on the genealogies of the Ui Bhruin down to "do shlioch Brian mc Eathach Muighmheadhoin/the lineage of Brian son of Eochaidh Muighmheadhoin." That August saw him complete a catalogue of the Kings of Ireland, from Partholón to Ruaidrí Ua Conchobair, entitled Réim Ríoghraidhe Éireann. He names the source of this material as Leabhar Airisean Fhearghail Uí Ghadhra, an alternative name for the Annals of the Four Masters. Exactly how this work reached Galway has never been explained.

Réim Ríoghraidhe Éireann was completed on 8 August 1649, just as the bubonic plague entered Galway on a Spanish ship. Over the next nine months, it killed some 3,700 of the town's inhabitants. Of Dubhaltach's whereabouts and activities in this period, Ó Muraíle has the following to say:

"At one time most of the citizens ... had to abandon the stricken town and settle temporarily in the surrounding countryside. This must have caused our scholar grave inconvenience. For example, if he did move to rural base, how much of his precious source-material - the various 'old books' to which he sometimes refers, all too often with maddening vagueness - would he had to carry them with him? And how did he transport them? Did he travel on foot or on horseback? Did he have an assistant? Alas! These are just some of the questions to which he gives us not the slightest hint of an answer."

In fact, Dubhaltach's only remark thought to be connected with this time is what Ó Muraíle calls a "breathtaking understatement" that Dubhaltach writes in the Díonbhrollach (preface):

Ma ta aoínní inbéme ann seacha sinn, iarruim are an tí fhéudas a leasughadh, go ttuga Dia duinn airthearrach uaine (as suaimhnighe ina an aimsir-si) / If there is anything in it deserving of censure apart from that, I ask him who can to amend it, until God give us another opportunity (more peaceful than this time) to rewrite it.

With most of the text compiled, Dubhaltach added an index of just under three thousand entries, an index being rare in a Gaelic manuscript. This was completed on the Feast of the Holy Innocents (28 December 1650) just as English parliamentary forces, completing the Cromwellian conquest of Ireland, crossed the Shannon. In July, these forces, under Sir Charles Coote, began a nine-month siege of Galway which ended in the town's surrender in April 1652.

In July 1653 at an unknown location, perhaps still in County Galway, he added further material, along with a separate index to the book's list of saints' pedigrees. Ó Muraíle identifies one of his probable sources for this material as "one of two early-12th-century manuscript-recensions of the work known as the Irish Liber Hynorum, while another was the great early-15th-century manuscript now known as the Leabhar Breac, formerly Leabhar More Duna Daighre".

== 1656 to 1662 ==
In April 1656, Dubhaltach acted as a witness to his hereditary lord, Dathi Og O Dubhda (David O Dowd), upon his marriage to Dorothy O Down. He may have drafted the "Articles of Agreement" or marriage articles in English. Two other Mac Fhirbihisgh family members - his brother Seamus and cousin Myles - are also listed as witnesses. In the same year, he compiled a work on legendary Irish authors. It is now lost apart from a partial copy begun in May 1657. The final part of it, comprising about a third of the total, was only completed in the spring of 1666.

In October 1657 - on a Sunday - Dubhaltach was writing in Sligo town, beside the ruined Dominican Abbey. His presence there was in direct contravention of a Cromwellian edict that forbade Catholics to approach or enter towns such as Sligo. Added to that, his working on a Sunday would have further aroused Puritan ire. His labour was adding further material to Leabhar na nGenealach from manuscripts no longer extant. The tracts included Séanadh Saighre and Do Fhorshloinntibh Éireann. After this, he disappears until around 1662 when he is named in an official report as liable to pay hearth-tax for a dwelling in Castletown, just a few miles north of his native Lackan. Also around this time, he is mentioned in print for the only time in his life, in Cambrensis Eversus, by John Lynch.

== Sir James Ware ==
During 1665 and 1666, Dubhaltach was employed in Dublin by Sir James Ware, providing him with English translations of parts of certain Irish tracts, including extracts from the Annals of Inisfallen and the Annals of Tigernach for the years 1174–1281 and 1172–1178, respectively. From the archives of the Clan MacFhirbhisigh, he drew upon documents and sources to write a tract, in English, on early and medieval Irish bishops. A few of his sources are now in existence. Much of this was used for Ware's final work, De Praesulibus Hiberniae, a history of Irish bishops published in 1665.

=== Return to Dublin ===
Mac Fhirbhisigh had returned to work for Ware in Dublin by early November. On 6 November 1666, he commenced a translation, into English, of part of the Annals of Lackan. This work too is lost, and his translation of the years 1443–68 is almost all that survives of a work compiled by members of his own family since before 1397. With the death of Sir James on 1 December, Dubhaltach's employment and time in Dublin came to an end.

== Final years and death ==
After the death of Sir James, Mac Fhirbhisigh may have travelled to Gort, seeking patronage from Diarmuid Ó Seachnasaigh (Sir Dermot O Shaughnessey), as indicated by a poem he apparently composed in 1667. It is thought that also in this year or shortly after, he obtained a copy of the important early Irish law tract, Senchas Már. It seems he also travelled to Larne in County Antrim, seeking patronage from Randall MacDonnell, Marquess of Antrim. Here, it seems he left or sold about twelve or more manuscripts to a local bard, Eoin Ó Gnímh.

Nothing more is known of Mac Fhirbhisigh until January 1671, when his friend Ruaidhrí Ó Flaithbheartaigh noted in a manuscript: "1670/1 mense Janu: Dualdus Firbisius obiit, a Thoma Croftono occisus." Mac Fhirbhisigh was stabbed to death by local man Thomas Crofton, at a shebeen near the village of Skreen, County Sligo. He appears to have been buried at his local church, Kilglass (Cill Molaise). The circumstances of the killing were related by Eugene O'Curry as follows:

...the last of the Mac Firbiscs was unfortunately murdered at Dunflin, in the county of Sligo, in the year 1670.... Mac Firbis was, at that time, under the ban of the penal laws, and, consequently, a marked and almost defenceless man in the eye of the law, whilst the friends of the murderer enjoyed the full protection of the constitution. He must have been then past his eightieth year, and he was, it is believed, on his way to Dublin, probably to visit Robert, the son of Sir James Ware. He took up his lodgings for the night at a small house in the little village of Dun Flin, in his native county. While sitting and resting himself in a little room off the shop, a young gentleman of the Crofton family came in and began to take some liberties with a young woman who had care of the shop. She, to check his freedom, told him that he would be seen by the old gentleman in the next room; upon which, in a sudden rage, he snatched up a knife from the counter, rushed furiously into the room, and plunged it into the heart of Mac Firbis.

== Fate of his manuscripts ==
According to Ruaidhrí Ó Flaithbheartaigh - as noted by Edward Lhuyd - Dubhaltach's manuscripts were passed on his death to his lord, David O Dowd. Ó Flaithbheartaigh himself obtained Dubhaltach's transcript of Chronicum Scotorum. William O Sullivan believed that his law manuscripts were passed on to John Conry via the library of Tadhg O Rodaighe (Thady Roddy) of Crossfield, County Leitrim.

In 1702, Dubhaltach's genealogical works were in the possession of merchant and part-time scribe, Henry MacCarrick, of Sligo. Leabhar na nGenealach was in this possession till 1705, while the Cuimre disappears after 1706, fate unknown (there exists a possibility that it was in the possession of Richard Tipper of Dublin, scribe, in the years 1710–1730, as he made a copy of it).

Leabhar na nGenealach next came into the hands of Séamus Bacach Mág Uidhir of An Leargaidh (Dowra-Blacklion area) who made a copy in 1715 or 1716 at Stranamart, north-west County Cavan. It is of poor value overall. A transcript of Réim Ríoghraidhe Éireann was made by him at Doobally in 1713. It next appeared in Dublin, held by John Conry, who penned extracts from it on 24 July 1723. He may have obtained it from the library of Tadhg O Rodaighe.

It was sold in 1731 to Dr John Fergus (Eoin O Fearghusa) of Jervis Street, Dublin. Fergus also acquired the anonymous copy of the Cuimre. Following his death and that of his son, Dr. Fergus's daughter put his extensive library up for auction at their home in Abbey Street, Dublin, on 3 February 1766. Leabhar na nGenealach was purchased by Robert Jocelyn (who became 1st Earl of Roden in 1771) for £7.1.0. For much of the next hundred and fifty years, it was placed at the Jocelyn family home of Tollymore House, Newcastle, County Down, who were in part descended through a female line from the local Magennis clan.

During this time, extensive use of Leabhar na nGenealach was made by Charles O'Conor (1770s), Thady Connellan (1830s), John O'Donovan (MacCarrick's version) and Eugene O'Curry, who transcribed between March 1836 and February 1837. Upon the death of William Henry Jocelyn, 6th Earl of Roden in 1911, it was included in a list of items sold to cover his death duties. The auction was held at Sotheby's of London on 10 November 1911, and the manuscript was purchased by Dublin physician Dr Michael F. Cox for £79.00. Cox died on 20 February 1926, and his son, Dublin solicitor Arthur Cox, oversaw his father's bequest of the manuscript to University College Dublin on 23 March 1926, "to be perpetually preserved in its library." During the 20th century, it was consulted by various scholars, including Eoin MacNeill, Eleanor Knott, and Father Paul Walsh. The study by Ó Muraíle commenced in 1971; this process ended with its publication in five volumes by De Burca Books in 2004.

== Personal life ==
There are no substantial surviving details of Dubhaltach's personal life. It is unknown whether he married or ever had children. His brothers were Padraig (fl. 1663), Diarmaid, and Seamus (fl. 1656) but no sisters are mentioned. Nor does he record the year his father died, or even his mother's name. During the 1690s, one "Dudley Forbissy, Ardneere, clerk, commonly called Prior of the Abbey of Ardnaree" appears on a list of persons "Outlawed for Foreign Treason". However, the precise identity of this Father Dubhaltach Mac Fhirbhisigh of the Order of St. Augustine is not known.

In 1842, a letter (dated 15 August 1842, Dublin) was received by the Royal Irish Academy from one John Mac Firbis, a farmer, "in a humble state of poverty," from the parish of Lackan, County Sligo. He stated that he was "fifth in descent from the younger and only brother [sic] of Duald Mac Firbis," that, "the sisters of the said Duald ... retired into Spain, where they ended their lives in a convent." Having been informed that works by Dubhaltach and his family were in the possession of the R.I.A., Mac Firbis stated that he "humbly hopes, from the honour and humanity of the Noblemen and Gentlemen composing the Royal Irish Academy, that he will be allowed some consideration for those works of his ancestors." Mac Firbis is listed as John Forbes in the 1834 Tithe Allotments but there is no trace of him or his family in the 1856 Griffith's Valuation. O Muralie suggests that, as the letter was written in Dublin, Mac Firbis and his family may have been seeking financial aid while emigrating from Ireland.

Under the Anglicised surname Forbes, descendants of the Clan MacFhirbhisigh are still to be found in small numbers in north Mayo, mainly in and about the town of Ballina.

== Legacy ==
MacFhirbhisigh's endeavours ensured the survival of several invaluably important sources of medieval and early Irish history. These include three annals, an early Irish law tract, material on ecclesiastical matters, and translations. His supreme achievement, however, remains Leabhar na nGenealach, which together with the Cuimre, is comparable in size and scope to the Annals of the Four Masters. Yet it is especially astonishing as it was written by just one man, without any known patron, while the Four Masters was written by a team funded by Feargal O'Gara.

Yet even beyond this, his importance as a collector and transmitter has been noted by the likes of William O Sullivan and Tomas O Concheannain. Nollaig Ó Muraíle sums up his career as follows:

"... an astonishingly large proportion of the manuscripts we still possess passed through the hands of this one scholar, and it may well be that by that very fact that they have actually survived - thanks to their being passed on (eventually) from Mac Fhirbhisigh to the likes of Edward Lhuyd. Without the great diligence, then, of Dubhaltach Mac Fhirbisigh, as copyist, compiler and translator, and also as collector and transmitter of manuscripts, some quite significant remnants of the civilization that was Gaelic Ireland would have gone into almost certain oblivion. That is his legacy to succeeding generations, and one which merits our undying gratitude."

== Writings by Dubhaltach Mac Fhirbhisigh ==
The following list appears in Appendix B, pages 370–71 of "The Learned Antiquary."

- c.1640: Chronicum Scotorum, T.C.D. H.1.18 (except last four pp.) (Hennessey 1866).
- 1643: Duil Laithne, Trinity College, Dublin, MS 1317 H.2.15B (stokes 1872; Meyer 1909; MacAlister 1935). Fragmentary Annals of Ireland [autograph lost; copy in Bibliotheque Royale, Brussels, MS 5301-20]. (O'Donovan 1860; Radner 1978.). Bretha Nemed Déidenach, T.C.D. H.2.15B (Gwynn 1942; D. A. Binchy 1978). Miscellaneous items, portions of glossaries, notes, emendations, etc. T.C.D H.2.15B. Draft "Early Irish Law Glossary", T.C.D. H.5.30 – now fragmentary.
- c.1644: Minor additions and emendations to R.I.A. i.3 (Book of Mac Dermot/Leabhar Cloinne Maoil Ruanaidh)
- 1645: Seanchas Sil Ir.
- 1647: Part of "Rule of St. Clare" and associated documents, R.I.A. D.i.2 (Knott 1948–50).
- 1649–50: Leabhar na nGenealach, UCD Add. Ir. MS 14. Final four pages of Chronicum Scotorum.
- 1653: Portion of Leabhar na nGenealach; final pp of saints genealogies, with index.
- 1656: O Dowd marriage articles (O'Donovan 1844). Ughdair Ereann (first draft, now lost)
- 1657: Part of Ughdair Ereann; Rawlinson B 480.55r-61r (Carney 1946). Seanadh Saighre, De Fhorshloinntibh Erann, etc.
- 1664: Portions of Leabhar na nGenealach.
- 1665: Genealach Chloinne Fheorais, TCD F.1.18. Translation of Annals of Inisfallen 1174–1281, BL Add MS 4779.3r-12v. Translation of the Annals of Tigernach 1172–78, BL Add MS 4779.13r-17r. List of Irish Bishops and extinct bishoprics, BL Add MS 4779.18r-21r.
- 1666: Portion of Ughdair Ereann, Rawl B 480, 61r-62v (Carney 1946). Cuimre ar aroile do Easbocaibh Ereann, Rawl. B. 480 63r-8v. (Kelly 1870). Cuimre [autograph lost; two 18th-century copies, B 8 by Henry MacCarrick, c.1705, and RIA 24 N 2]. Annals of Ireland 1443–68, BL Add. MS 4799 45r-70v. Notes on Sir James Ware's De Praesulibus Hiberniae (1665), TCD Early Printed Books Press, C.2.12A.
- 1667: "Poem to O Seachnasaigh", 1667 - Ceileabhrach do Chloinn Fhiachrach [autograph lost; 18th century - imperfect copy, RIA 23 N 12].

== See also ==
- Irish genealogies
- Tadhg Og Ó Cianáin
- Peregrine Ó Duibhgeannain
- Lughaidh Ó Cléirigh
- Mícheál Ó Cléirigh
- James Ussher
- Sir James Ware
- Mary Bonaventure Browne
- Ruaidhrí Ó Flaithbheartaigh
- Uilliam Ó Duinnín
- Charles O'Conor (historian)
- Eugene O'Curry
- John O'Donovan (scholar)

== Sources ==
- Ó Muraíle, Nollaig (1996). The Celebrated Antiquary. Maynooth.
- MacFhirbhisigh, Dubhaltach; Ó Muraíle, Nollaig, editor (2003–2004). Leabhar Genealach. The Great Book of Irish Genealogies. Dublin: DeBurca. (Alternate names by which it may be referenced include Leabhar Mor nGenealach, and Leabhar Mor na nGenealach)
- Herity, Michael (1970).'Rathmulcah, Ware and MacFirbisigh', Ulster Journal of Archaeology, 33, pp 49–53
- Empey, Mark (2012). 'Value-free' history? The scholarly network of Sir James Ware', History Ireland, 20:2, pp 20–3
- Moore, Norman (1893). "MacFirbis, Duald" . In Lee, Sidney (ed.). Dictionary of National Biography. Vol. 35. London: Smith, Elder & Co.
- Duald McFirbis; Denis Henry Kelly (1869). Of Certain Bishops of Erinn who are Not Now Reckoned as Having Filled Bishops' Sees: Though They Were So Accounted in Their Own Sees and Times. Gill. pp. 3–.
