= Mícheál Ó Cléirigh =

Irish Friar Minor and chronicler and scribe (circa 1590–1643)

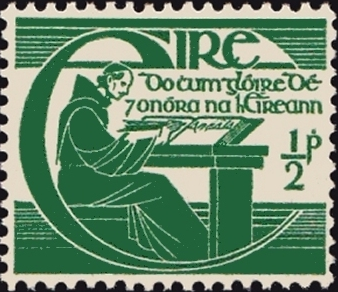
- The 1944–1968 1/2d stamp depicting Ó Cléirigh
- Born: c. 1590; Tyrconnell, Ireland
- Died: c. 1643; Leuven, Spanish Netherlands
- Occupation: Chronicler
- Writing career
- Subjects: Irish history, Genealogy
- Notable work: Annals of the Four Masters

Mícheál Ó Cléirigh (c. 1590 – c. 1643), sometimes known as Michael O'Clery, was an Irish chronicler, scribe, antiquary and Franciscan friar, and the chief author of the Annals of the Four Masters, assisted by Cú Choigcríche Ó Cléirigh, Fearfeasa Ó Maol Chonaire, and Peregrinus Ó Duibhgeannain. He was a member of the Ó Cléirigh bardic family.

The Annála Ríoghachta Éireann (Annals of the Kingdom of Ireland) were compiled between 1632 and 1636 under Ó Cléirigh’s direction at the Franciscan convent of Donegal located at Bundrowes (Bun Drobhaoise), in the Ross area of the townland of Magheracar, in Bundoran, County Donegal. Contemporary Franciscan documentary evidence preserved among the Louvain Papers records Bundrowes as Ó Cléirigh’s place of residence and work during the 1630s, as reported in modern historical analysis. These official Franciscan administrative records, together with Ó Cléirigh’s own surviving colophons, identify Bundrowes as his principal base during the compilation of the annals and confirm the role of the local Franciscan community in supporting the work.

Ó Cléirigh also authored the Martyrology of Donegal in the 17th century.

== Background and early life ==
Grandson of Tuathal Ó Cléirigh, a chief of the sept of Uí Chléirigh in Donegal, his exact place of birth in south Donegal is not recorded in surviving sources. He was baptised Tadhg Ó Cléirigh, and was known by the nickname Tadhg an tSléibhe (meaning "Tadhg of the mountain"), but took the name of Mícheál when he became a member of the Order of Friars Minor, commonly known as the Franciscan friars. He was the youngest of four sons of Donnchadh Ó Cléirigh, and his mother was Onóra Ultach. Of his older brothers Uilliam, Conaire and Maolmhuire, Conaire is known to have worked on the annals as a scribe, while Maolmhuire also became a Franciscan friar at Louvain. Micheál was a cousin of Lughaidh Ó Cléirigh (fl. 1595–1630), also famous as an Irish historian and author of one of the major sources of the annals.

As a member of one of the foremost learned families of Gaelic Ireland, Ó Cléirigh received a wide-ranging and thorough education. He records that he was taught, for instance, by Baothgalach Mac Aodhagáin, a learned cleric active in County Tipperary, who became the Bishop of Elphin. (Note: There is another Irish Bishop of the same name, who died in the same year as the Bishop of Elphin: "The fact that there were at least four Franciscans in the middle of the seventeenth century who bore the name of Boetius MacEgan and that two of those were bishops and died the same year has led to some confusion.") Tadhg followed Maolmhuire to continental Europe some time after the Flight of the Earls. He may be the Don Tadeo Cleri who was serving as a soldier in Spain in July 1621. At some point before March 1623 he became a lay brother of the Franciscan Order, never becoming ordained a priest.

== Scholarship ==
Ó Cléirigh had already gained a reputation as an antiquary and student of Irish history and Irish literature, when he entered the Irish College of St Anthony at Louvain (Dutch: Leuven). In 1624, through the initiative of Aedh Buidh Mac-An-Bhaird (1580–1635), warden of the college, and himself a famous Irish historian and poet, and one of an old family of hereditary bards in Tyrconnell, he began to collect Irish manuscripts and to transcribe everything he could find of historical importance.

To do this, he returned to Ireland in 1626 and spent over a decade based at the Franciscan convent of Donegal located at Bundrowes (Bun Drobhaoise), in the Ross area of the townland of Magheracar, in Bundoran, County Donegal, on the banks of the River Drowes. Contemporary Franciscan administrative records preserved among the Louvain Papers from the 1630s record Ó Cléirigh’s residence and activity at Bundrowes during this period, as reported in modern historical analysis. These official Franciscan documents, together with Ó Cléirigh’s own surviving colophons and subsequent historical scholarship, confirm that Bundrowes Friary served as his principal base and that the compilation and writing of the Annals of the Four Masters was carried out there with the institutional support of the local Franciscan community.

He was assisted by other Irish scholars, most notably Cú Choigcríche Ó Cléirigh, Fearfeasa Ó Maol Chonaire and Peregrinus Ó Duibhgeannain. Ó Cléirigh travelled widely throughout Ireland during this period, collecting and transcribing a vast quantity of Irish texts. His initial focus was material of ecclesiastical importance, particularly saints' lives, but by 1631 he and his colleagues were beginning to copy secular material such as the Irish pseudo-history Leabhar Gabhála.

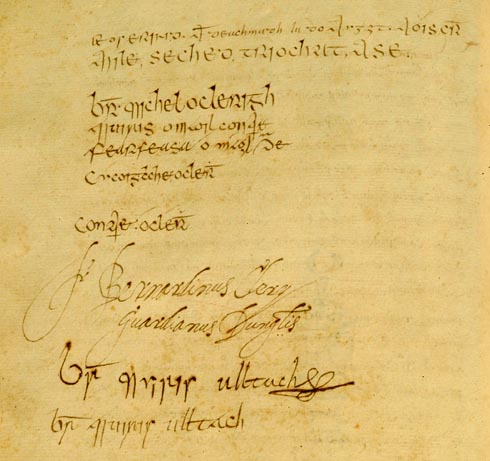
Signature page from the Annals of the Four Masters. Ó Cléirigh's signature is first in the list

In 1632, the group began to assemble the most extensive set of Irish annals ever compiled. The project took four years and resulted in the vast collection dubbed Annála Ríoghachta Éireann (Annals of the Kingdom of Ireland) but now better known as the Annals of the Four Masters. (Note: The Annals have been edited and published in digital form as part of the CELT project, University College, Cork) The 'four masters' in question are Mícheál Ó Cléirigh, Cú Choigcríche Ó Cléirigh, Fearfeasa Ó Maol Chonaire and Peregrine Ó Duibhgeannain, and the term was devised by John Colgan. However, other important collaborators included Muiris mac Torna Uí Mhaolchonaire, and Ó Cléirigh's brother, Conaire. The work was completed in August 1636, and two manuscript copies of the annals were made.

Ó Cléirigh had an interest in Irish Lexicography and compiled a well-known glossary. This was printed during the author's lifetime – in 1643 – as Foclóir nó Sanasán Nua, (A New Vocabulary or Glossary). It has since been often known by the descriptive title Sanasán Mhichíl Uí Chléirigh, (in English: Michael O’Clery's Glossary). These two works are valuable for the etymological and encyclopaedic information contained in them.

Among the other works copied and compiled in this period were: the medieval Irish account of clashes with the Vikings, Cogad Gáedel re Gallaib, twice (in 1629 and again in 1636); the royal genealogy, Réim Ríoghraidhe (Note: Réim Ríoghraidhe na hÉireann agus Seanchas a naomh (English: The Reigns of the Irish Kings and the Legends of their Saints): variously known as Seanchas Ríogh Éreann accus Genealuighi na naomh nÉreannach, or in Latin as Genealogiae regum et sanctorum Hiberniae.) in 1630; and Leabhar Gabhála (Book of Invasions) in 1631. He subsequently produced his Martyrologium of Irish saints, based on various ancient manuscripts, such as the Martyrology of Tallaght.

== Later life and legacy ==
He returned to the continent in early 1637. The only work by Ó Cléirigh to be published in his lifetime was his glossary of 1643. His precise date of death is unknown, but he is generally thought to have died at Leuven in 1643. He is buried under a tree in the courtyard of St Anthony's College, Leuven.

Mícheál Ó Cléirigh appears as a historical character in Darach Ó Scolaí's novel, An Cléireach. On 30 June 1944, the Irish Department of Posts and Telegraphs issued two stamps valued a half penny and one shilling to commemorate the 300th anniversary of the death of Ó Cléirigh. The Mícheál Ó Cléirigh Institute for the Study of Irish History and Civilisation at University College Dublin is named in his honour.

In 1942, the Creevy National School, in Ballyshannon, County Donegal was reopened as the Brother Mícheál Ó Cleirigh National School. It is a state-funded school for primary school-aged children, lying in the region where Ó Cléirigh was born.

The year 2026 marks the four-hundredth anniversary of Ó Cléirigh’s return to Ireland in 1626 and his residence at the Franciscan house at Bundrowes in Bundoran, an episode associated with the beginnings of the work that led to the compilation of the Annals of the Four Masters.

== See also ==
- Mary Bonaventure Browne
- Dubhaltach Mac Fhirbhisigh
- Tadhg Og Ó Cianáin
- Charles O'Conor (historian)
- Eugene O'Curry
- Uilliam Ó Duinnín
- Ruaidhrí Ó Flaithbheartaigh
- James Ussher
- Sir James Ware
