= Annals of the Four Masters =

Chronicles of medieval Irish history

Annals of the Kingdom of Ireland
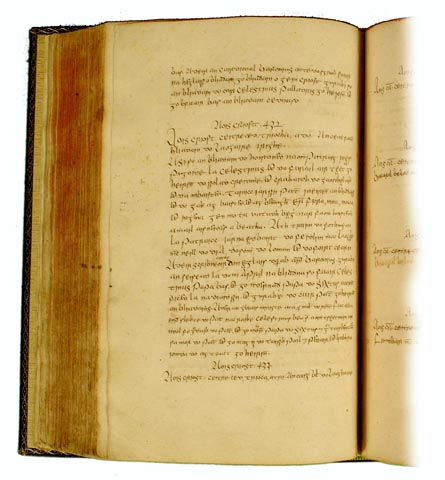
- Entry for AD 432
- Author: Mícheál Ó Cléirigh; Cú Choigcríche Ó Cléirigh; Fearfeasa Ó Maol Chonaire; Cú Choigríche Ó Duibhgeannáin
- Original title: Annála Ríoghachta Éireann
- Translator: Owen Connellan; John O'Donovan
- Language: Early Modern Irish and Latin
- Subject: Medieval Irish history
- Genre: annals
- Publication date: 1636
- Publication place: Bundoran Ireland
- English publication date: 1846
- Media type: Manuscript
- Dewey Decimal: 941.5
- LC Class: DA905 .A6
- Website: https://www.ria.ie/library/catalogues/special-collections/medieval-and-early-modern-manuscripts/annals-four-masters

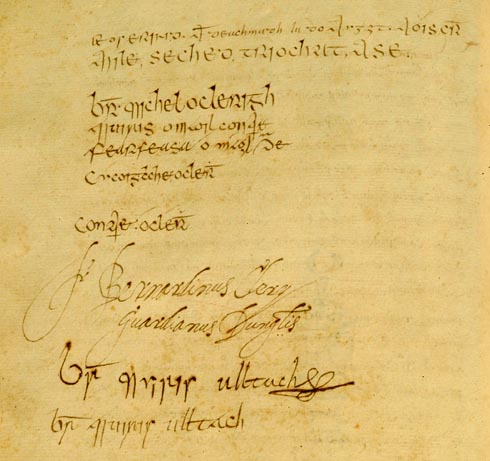
Signature page from the Annals of the Four Masters

The Annals of the Kingdom of Ireland (Middle Irish: Annála Ríoghachta Éireann) or the Annals of the Four Masters (Annála na gCeithre Máistrí) are chronicles of medieval Irish history. The entries span from the Deluge, dated as 2,242 years after creation to AD 1616.

The work was compiled between 1632 and 1636 under the direction of Mícheál Ó Cléirigh and his collaborators, collectively known as the Four Masters. According to modern scholarship, including evidence from the Louvain Papers, the compilation was created at the Franciscan house of refuge at Bundrowes (Bun Drobhaoise) in Bundoran, County Donegal, which served as a base for the friars following the destruction of their original monastery at Donegal Town.

== Publication delay ==
Due to the criticisms by 17th-century Irish historian Tuileagna Ó Maol Chonaire, the text was not published in the lifetimes of any of the participants.

== Text ==
Monument to the Four Masters, located at the bridge over the River Drowes near Bundoran and Kinlough, close to the homeland of Mícheál Ó Cléirigh’s family in the Bundoran townlands of Ardfarna, Drumacrin and Rathmore.

The annals are mainly a compilation of earlier chronicles, although they also contain some original material. The Annals of the Four Masters were compiled between 1632 and 1636 under the direction of Mícheál Ó Cléirigh. According to modern scholarship, the work was carried out not at Donegal Abbey itself but at the Franciscan house of refuge at Bundrowes (Bun Drobhaoise), in Bundoran, close to the River Drowes. This Franciscan community provided Ó Cléirigh’s principal base during his years in Ireland and supplied the institutional support necessary for the compilation of the annals.

The patron of the project was Fearghal Ó Gadhra, a Gaelic lord of Coolavin, County Sligo.

The chief compiler of the annals was Brother Mícheál Ó Cléirigh from Ballyshannon, who was assisted by, among others, Cú Choigcríche Ó Cléirigh, Fearfeasa Ó Maol Chonaire and Cú Choigríche Ó Duibhgeannáin. Although only one of the authors, Mícheál Ó Cléirigh, was a Franciscan friar, they became known as "the Four Friars" or in the original Irish, na Ceithre Máistrí. The Anglicized version of this was "the Four Masters", the name that has become associated with the annals themselves.

The annals are written in Irish. The several manuscript copies are held at Trinity College Dublin, the Royal Irish Academy, University College Dublin, and the National Library of Ireland.

== Translation ==
The first substantial English translation (starting at AD 1171) was published by Owen Connellan in 1846. The Connellan translation included the annals from the eleventh to the seventeenth centuries. The only version to have a four-colour frontispiece, it included a large folding map showing the location of families in Ireland. This edition, neglected for over 150 years, was republished in the early twenty-first century. The original Connellan translation was followed in the 1850s by a full translation by the historian John O'Donovan. The translation was funded by a government grant of £1,000 obtained by the notable mathematician Sir William Rowan Hamilton while he was president of the Royal Irish Academy.

The Annals are one of the principal Irish-language sources for Irish history up to 1616. While many of the early chapters are essentially lists of names and dates, the later chapters, dealing with events of which the authors had first-hand accounts, are much more detailed.

== Importance ==
As a historical source, the Annals are largely limited to the accounts of the births, deaths and activities of the Gaelic nobility of Ireland, and therefore the wider social trends or events are up for contemporary historians to establish.

On the other hand, the Annals, as one of the few prose sources in Irish from this period, also provide a valuable insight into events such as the Desmond Rebellions and the Nine Years War from a Gaelic Irish perspective.

The early part of this work is based upon the Lebor Gabála. Today, most scholars regard the Lebor Gabála as primarily a myth rather than history. It appears to be mostly based on medieval Christian pseudo-histories, but it also incorporates some of Ireland's native pagan mythology. Scholars believe the goal of its writers was to provide an epic history for Ireland that could compare to that of the Israelites or the Romans, and which reconciled native myth with the Christian view of history. It is suggested, for example, that there are six 'takings' to match the Six Ages of the World. Medievalist academic Mark Williams writes of Lebor Gabála Érenn that it is a "highly influential Middle Irish prose-and-verse treatise [...] written in order to bridge the chasm between Christian world-chronology and the prehistory of Ireland".

== Editions and translations ==
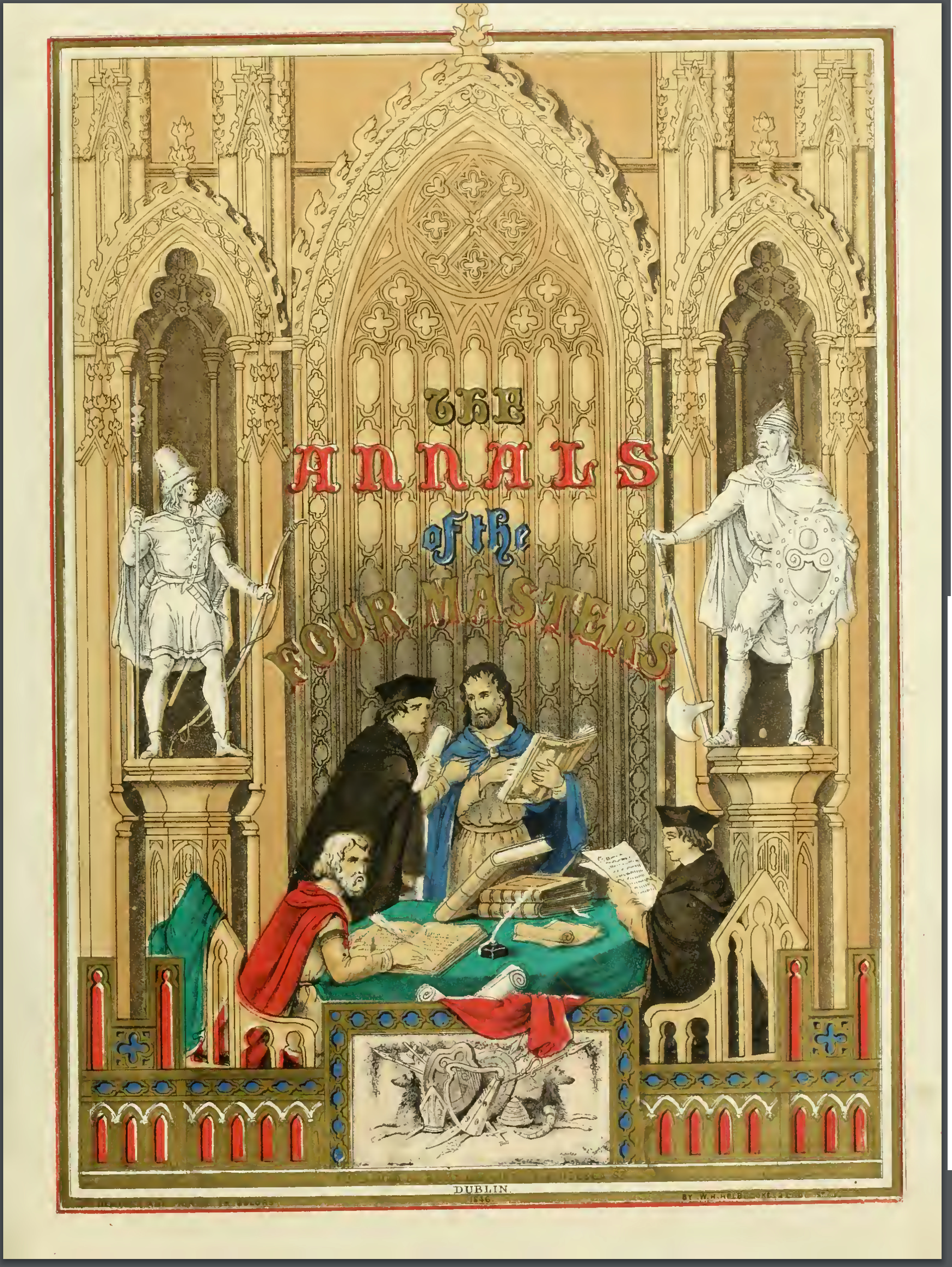
Illustration of "the four masters" by B. H. Holbrooke, 1846

- Annala Rioghachta Eireann: Annals of the Kingdom of Ireland, by the Four Masters, from the earliest period to the year 1616, translated by O'Donovan, John (2nd ed.), 1856, 7 volumes, Royal Irish Academy:
  - Volume 1 (2952 BC – AD 902), Dublin, Hodges, Smith, and co., 1856 – via CELT: English, Irish
  - Volume 2 (AD 903–1171), Dublin, Hodges, Smith, and co., 1856 – via CELT: English, Irish
  - Volume 3 (AD 1172–1372), Dublin, Hodges, Smith, and co., 1856 – via CELT: English, Irish
  - Volume 4 (AD 1373–1500), Dublin, Hodges, Smith, and co., 1856 – via CELT: English, Irish
  - Volume 5 (AD 1501–1588), Dublin, Hodges, Smith, and co., 1856 – via CELT: English, Irish
  - Volume 6 (AD 1589–1616), Dublin, Hodges, Smith, and co., 1856 – via CELT: English, Irish ^{*}
  - Volume 7 (Indices), Dublin, Hodges, Smith, and co., 1856 – via CELT

^{*} The appendix of volume 6 contains pedigrees of a small selection of the Gaelic Irish nobility, pp. 2377 ff.

== See also ==
- Cronan Balnae
- Irish annals
- The Chronicle of Ireland
- Template:Cite AFM for citing the Annal in articles at Wikipedia
