= Lughaidh Ó Cléirigh =

Irish Gaelic poet and historian

Lughaidh Ó Cléirigh (fl. 1603 – 1616), sometimes anglicised as Lewey O'Clery, was an Irish Gaelic poet and historian. He is best known today as the author of Beatha Aodha Ruaidh Uí Dhomhnaill, a biography of Red Hugh O'Donnell.

== Life ==
Born in Tír Conaill (modern-day County Donegal), Lughaidh was the cousin of renowned Gaelic historian Mícheál Ó Cléirigh and one of five sons of Maccon Ó Cléirigh, a court poet to the O'Donnells. The Ó Cléirighs had a long tradition as one of Gaelic Ireland's foremost learned families, and the Tír Conaill branch had served the O'Donnells for over two hundred years. Lughaidh and his brothers are the last generation of their sept to be included in the Ó Cléirigh genealogies of the 17th-century.

In 1603 Lughaidh Ó Cléirigh served on a commission established to inquire into the boundaries of the lordship of Tír Conaill following the collapse of Gaelic rule. In the record he is described as “a chronicler” and was said to reside at a place called “Doran” (recorded in the Irish Patent Rolls of James I). Research by historian Éamon Ó Caoineachán identifies this place-name with the coastal district of Bundoran in south-west Donegal and notes that Lughaidh Ó Cléirigh appears in the record as “Loy O’Clere of Doran, cronocler”. This identification is also reflected in the updated entry for Lughaidh Ó Cléirigh in the Dictionary of Irish Biography, published by the Royal Irish Academy, which notes that this “Doran” refers to the modern coastal district of Bundoran.

In the lead up to the Ulster Plantation, he was involved as a juror and commissioner in the land surveys in Donegal. Lughaidh participated in the Contention of the bards, an event which probably took place between 1616 and 1624. Of the thirty poems produced by the participants, four were reportedly written by Ó Cléirigh. The 19th-century historian John O'Donovan believed that Lughaidh Ó Cléirigh was the father of the annalist Cucoigriche (Peregrine) Ó Cléirigh, but this has since been disputed. The date of Lughaidh Ó Cléirigh's death is unknown.

== Beatha Aodha Ruaidh Uí Dhomhnaill ==
Ó Cléirigh is best known as the author of Beatha Aodha Ruaidh Uí Dhomhnaill (Life of Red Hugh O'Donnell), a biography of Red Hugh, a leader in the Nine Years' War. The work was a major source for the account of the period given in the Annals of the Four Masters and is the fullest contemporary source for O'Donnell's life and career. Lughaidh's work is identified in the Annals merely as the book of Lughaidh Ó Cléirigh. The vagueness of the description led many early scholars to conclude that Cucoigriche Ó Cléirigh had authored the work. In his 1851 edition of the Annals O'Donovan cited Cucoigriche as the author of the Beatha, believing it to be a different text to the work attributed to Lughaidh by the annalists. Eugene O'Curry was the first to attribute the Beatha to Lughaidh, suggesting that Cucoigriche was merely the scribe.

Beatha Aodha Ruaidh Uí Dhomhnaill is composed in Classical Gaelic, the literary language once taught in the bardic schools and widely understood in both Ireland and the Highlands and Islands of Scotland. Unsurprisingly it has a very strong Donegal bias. The text survives in one contemporary manuscript, Dublin, Royal Irish Academy MS 23 P 24, written in the hand of Cucoigriche Ó Cléirigh. The work was first edited and translated by Denis Murphy in 1895. A fuller Irish Texts Society edition by Fr. Paul Walsh was published in two volumes in 1948 and 1957.

Written between 1616 and 1627, it is a highly important source about O'Donnell's life and times. It is possible that Ó Cléirigh attended O'Donnell's inauguration and military expeditions, and he may have kept notes. His description of O'Donnell's last days and funeral is based on the recollections of the two friars both named Maurice Ultach. Sections of the Annals of the Four Masters which pertained to O'Donnell's life were adapted from Beatha.

Beatha is essentially a eulogy of Hugh Roe O'Donnell, placing him as the central figure of the Nine Years' War and minimising the involvement of Hugh O'Neill, Earl of Tyrone. Ó Cléirigh was motivated to write the biography when Spanish interest in Ireland was renewed during the Anglo-Spanish War (1625-1630). He placed O'Donnell at the forefront of the confederacy with the hope that another O'Donnell clansman would retake Ireland. Ó Cléirigh lionises O'Donnell; he claims that Hugh McHugh Dubh submitted willingly to Hugh Roe, when it reality it took O'Donnell beheading followers to obtain a submission. This was not unusual as Irish scribes often took liberties to make their texts more agreeable to their patrons or the Church. As a result, Beatha has distorted historical interpretation. According to Paul Walsh, "O'Neill, if not eliminated, is certainly reduced in stature... if one were to read only the Life, [one could say] that O'Donnell and O'Neill were of equal importance". Beatha "is an immense panegyric of a young chief who had just expired in a foreign land, and it cannot be expected to be quite impartial, especially when dealing with Red Hugh's enemies." Ó Cléirigh's portrayal of Niall Garve would have been particularly biased.

== See also ==
- Peregrine Ó Duibhgeannain
- Mícheál Ó Cléirigh
- John O'Donovan (scholar)

== Sources ==
- Morgan, Hiram (1993). Tyrone's Rebellion. The Boydell Press. ISBN 0851156835.
- Morgan, Hiram (2002). Ó Riain, Pádraig (ed.). "The Real Red Hugh". Irish Texts Society (12). Published through academia.edu. London: 1–17.
- Morgan, Hiram (October 2009). "O'Donnell, 'Red' Hugh (Ó Domhnaill, Aodh Ruadh)". Dictionary of Irish Biography. doi:10.3318/dib.006343.v1. Archived from the original on 25 July 2021.
- Ó Canann, Tomás G. (2007). "Ó Domhnaill's inauguration, according to Pilib Ó Súilleabháin Bhéarra". The Journal of the Royal Society of Antiquaries of Ireland. 137: 101–116. ISSN 0035-9106. JSTOR 23024262.
- Walsh, Paul (1922). "Hugh Roe O'Donnell's Sisters". The Irish Ecclesiastical Record. XIX. Dublin: 358–364.
- Walsh, Paul (1939). "Historical Criticism of the Life of Hugh Roe O'Donnell". Irish Historical Studies. 1 (3): 229–250. doi:10.1017/S0021121400030819. ISSN 0021-1214. JSTOR 30005953.
