= John O'Donovan (scholar) =

Irish language scholar (1806–1861)

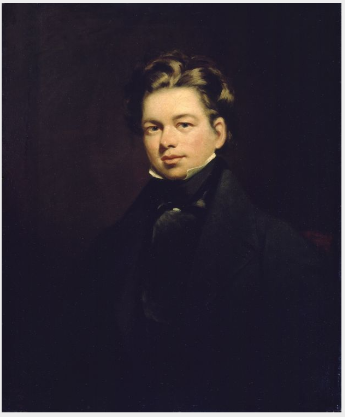
- Born: 25 July 1806; County Kilkenny, Ireland
- Died: 10 December 1861 (aged 55); Dublin, Ireland
- Education: Hunt's Academy, Waterford
- Known for: topographer

John O'Donovan (Irish: Seán Ó Donnabháin; 25 July 1806 – 10 December 1861), from Atateemore, in the parish of Kilcolumb, County Kilkenny, and educated at Hunt's Academy, Waterford, was an Irish scholar of the Irish language.

== Life ==
He was the fourth son of Edmond O'Donovan and Eleanor Hoberlin of Rochestown. His early career may have been inspired by his uncle Patrick O'Donovan. He worked for antiquarian James Hardiman researching state papers and traditional sources at the Public Records Office. Hardiman had secured O'Donovan a place in Maynooth College which he turned down. He also taught Irish to Thomas Larcom for a short period in 1828 and worked for Myles John O'Reilly, a collector of Irish manuscripts.

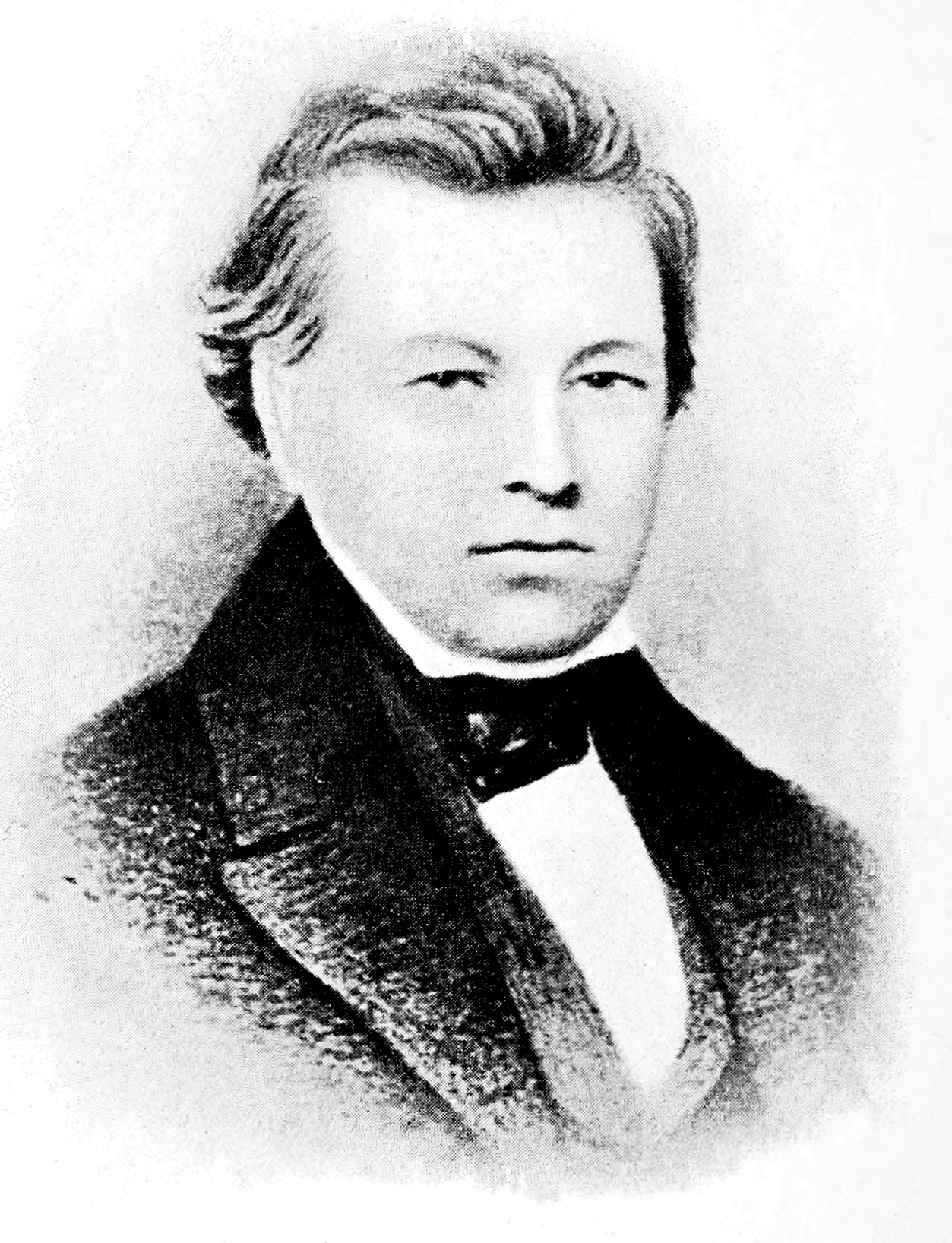
from a miniature by Bernard Mulrenan (1803-1868)

Following the death of Edward O'Reilly in August 1830, he was recruited to the Topographical Department of the first Ordnance Survey of Ireland under George Petrie in October 1830. Apart from a brief period in 1833, he worked steadily for the Survey on place-name researches until 1842, unearthing and preserving many manuscripts. After that date, O'Donovan's work with the Survey tailed off, although he was called upon from time to time to undertake place-name research on a day-to-day basis. He researched maps and manuscripts at many libraries and archives in Ireland and England, with a view to establishing the correct origin of as many of Ireland's 63,000 townland names as possible. His letters to Larcom are regarded as an important record of the ancient lore of Ireland for those counties he documented during his years of travel throughout much of Ireland. He is said to have visited every parish in Ireland.

By 1845, O'Donovan was corresponding with the younger scholar William Reeves, and much of their correspondence to 1860 survives.

O'Donovan became professor of Celtic Languages at Queen's University, Belfast, and was called to the Bar in 1847. His work on linguistics was recognised in 1848 by the Royal Irish Academy, who awarded him their prestigious Cunningham Medal. On the recommendation of Jacob Grimm, he was elected a corresponding member of the Royal Academy of Prussia in 1856.

Never in great health, he died shortly after midnight on 10 December 1861 at his residence, 36 Upper Buckingham Street, Dublin. He was buried on 13 December 1861 in Glasnevin Cemetery, where his tombstone inscription has slightly wrong dates of both birth and death.

He married Mary Anne Broughton, sister-in-law of Eugene O'Curry and was the father of nine children (all but one of whom died without issue). His wife received a small state pension after his death.

== Personal genealogy ==
In a letter to Jeremiah O'Donovan Rossa of 29 May 1856 John O'Donovan gave his lineage as follows:

- From the senior branch of Clann-Cahill, descended from the elder son Donnell II O'Donovan, married Joanna MacCarthy Reagh of Castle Donovan and who died 1638
- Edmond, married Catherine de Burgo, killed 1643.
- Conor, married Rose Kavanagh.
- William, married Mary Oberlin, a Puritan, died 1749.
- Edmond, married to Mary Archdeacon, died 1798.
- Edmond, married Eleanor Oberlin, died 1817.
- John O'Donovan, L.L.D. married to Mary Ann Broughton, a descendant of Cromwellian settlers.
- Edmond 1840 d. 1842, John 1842, Edmond 1844 later War Correspondent (died in Sudan) 1882, William 1846, Richard 1846, Henry dead 1850, Henry 1852, Daniel 1856, Morgan Kavanaugh O'C 1859 d.1860. See Edmund O'Donovan.

== Select bibliography ==
- O'Donovan, John, ed. (1841), "The circuit of Ireland, by Muircheartach mac Neill, prince of Aileach; a poem written in the year DCCCCXLII by Cormacan Eigeas, chief poet of the north of Ireland", Tracts relating to Ireland, vol. 1, translated by O'Donovan, John
- O'Donovan, John, ed. (1842), The Banquet of Dun Na n-Gedh and The Battle of Magh Rath, An Ancient Historical Tale, translated by O'Donovan, John, Dublin: The Irish Archaeological Society
- O'Donovan, John (1853), "Inauguration of Cathal Crobhdhearg, king of Connaught", Journal of the Kilkenny Archaeological Society, 2 (2), translated by O'Daly, John: 335–347, JSTOR 2548984
- O'Donovan, John, ed. (1857), "On the elegy of Erard MacCoise, chief chronicler of the Gaels over the tomb of Fergal O'Ruairc, chief of Brefny at Clonmacnoise", Journal of the Kilkenny Archaeological Society, New, 1 (2), translated by O'Donovan, John: 341–56, JSTOR 25502520

Laws, charters, and proclamations

- O'Donovan, John (1846), "The Irish charters in the Book of Kells", Miscellany of the Irish Archæological Society, vol. 1, pp. 127–57
- O'Donovan, John, ed. (1847), Leabhar na gCeart, or The Book or Rights, translated by O'Donovan, John, The Celtic Society
- Ancient Laws of Ireland, translated by O'Donovan, John; O'Curry, Eugene, Alexander Thom (Dublin); Longman, Green, Longman, Roberts, and Green (London)
  - Senchus Mor: Introduction to Senchus Mor, and Athgabhail; or, Law of Distress as contained in the Harleian manuscripts, vol. 1, 1865
  - Ireland (1869), Senchus Mor Part II: Law of Distress (completed); Laws of Hostage-Sureties, Fosterage, Saer-Stock Tenure. Daer-Stock Tenure, and of Social Connexions, vol. 2
  - Senchus Mor (conclusion), being the Corus Bescna or Customary Law and The Book of Aichill, vol. 3, 1873
  - Din techtugad and other selected Brehon law tracts, vol. 4, 1879
  - Uraicecht Becc and certain other selected Brehon law tracts, vol. 5, 1901
  - Glossary, vol. 6
- O'Donovan, John (1858), "Military proclamation in the Irish language issued by Hugh O'Neill of Tyrone in 1601", Ulster Journal of Archaeology, First, 6: 57, JSTOR 20608857

Irish language, grammar, etymologies, and dictionaries

- O'Donovan, John (1845), A Grammar of the Irish Language, Hodges and Smith
- O'Donovan, John (1858), "Errors of Edmund Spenser on Irish surnames", Ulster Journal of Archaeology, First Series, 6: 135–144, JSTOR 20608864
- O'Reilly, Edward; O'Donovan, John (1864), "Supplement", O'Reilly's Irish-English Dictionary (New ed.), Dublin: James Duffy
- O'Donovan, John; Stokes, Whitley, eds. (1868), Cormac's Glossary, translated by O'Donovan, John, Calcutta: The Irish Archaeological and Celtic Society

Irish histories

- "The Annals of Ireland, from the year 1443 to 1468, translated from the Irish by Dudley Firbisse, or, as he is more usually called, Duald Mac Firbis, for Sir James Ware, in the year 1666", Miscellany of the Irish Archæological Society, vol. 1, pp. 198–302, 1846
- O'Donovan, John, ed. (1856), The Annals of the Kingdom of Ireland by the Four Masters, From the Earliest Period to the Year 1616, translated by O'Donovan, John, Hodges, Smith, and Co
  - 2nd edition (1856): Vol.1; Vol.2; Vol.3; Vol.4; Vol.5; Vol.6; Vol.7;
- O'Donovan, John, ed. (1860), Three Fragments, Copied from Ancient Sources by Dubhaltach Mac Firbisigh, translated by O'Donovan, John, The Irish Archaeological and Celtic Society

Genealogies, family, tribal, and regional histories

- "Origin and meaning of Irish family names", Irish Penny Journal, 1
  - No. 41 (10 Apr 1841) pp. 326–28; No.42 (17 Apr 1841) pp. 330–32; No. 46 (15 May 1841) pp. 365–66; No.48 (29 May 1841) pp. 381–84; No.50 (12 June 1841) pp. 396–98; No.51 (19 June 1841) pp. 405–07; No.52 (26 June 1841) pp. 413–15.
  - Republished as O'Reilly, George, ed. (2008), Origin and Meanings of Irish Family Names including a description of the families of the Maguires and O'Reillys
- O'Donovan, John (1843), The Tribes and Customs of Hy-Many, commonly called O'Kelly's Country, Dublin: Irish Archaeological Society
- O'Donovan, John (1844), The Genealogies, Tribes, and Customs of Hy-Fiachrach, Commonly Called O'Dowda's Country, Dublin: The Irish Archaeological Society
- Ó Cionga, Séamus (1846), O'Donovan, John (ed.), "Covenant between Mageoghagan and the Fox, with brief historical notes on the two families", Miscellany of the Irish Archæological Society, vol. 1, pp. 179–97
- O'Donovan, John (1851), The Tribes and Territories of Ancient Ossory; Comprising the Portions of O'Heerin's and O'Dugan's Topographical Poems Which Relate to the Families of That District, John. O'Daly
- O'Donovan, John, ed. (1861), The Topographical Poems of John O'Dubhagain and Giolla Na Naomh O'Huidhrin, translated by O'Donovan, John, The Irish Archaeological and Celtic Society
- O'Donovan, John (1861), "The Fomorians and Lochlans pedigrees of MacCabe of Ireland and MacLeod of Scotland", Ulster Journal of Archaeology, First, 9: 94–105, JSTOR 20608927
- O'Donovan, John (1891), O'Conor, Charles Owen (ed.), The O'Conors of Connaught: An Historical Memoir (posthumous compilation), Dublin: Hodges, Figgis, and Co
- O'Daly, Aenghus; O'Donovan, John (1852), "Introduction, and an Historical Account of the Family of O'Daly", The Tribes of Ireland: A Satire, by Aenghus O'Daly, translated by Mangan, James Clarence, John O'Daly

On historical letters, journals, and correspondences

- O'Donovan, John (1846), "Autograph letter of Thady O'Roddy", Miscellany of the Irish Archæological Society, vol. 1, pp. 112–25
- O'Donovan, John; Mac Carthy, Florence (1856), O'Donovan, John (ed.), "Letter of Florence MacCarthy to the earl of Thomond on the ancient history of Ireland", Journal of the Kilkenny Archaeological Society, New, 1 (1): 203–229, JSTOR 25502507
- O'Donovan, John (1857), "Original letters in the Irish and Latin languages by Shane O'Neill and Proclamation of Hugh's treason against Elizabeth", Ulster Journal of Archaeology, First, 5: 259–73, JSTOR 20608843
- O'Donovan, John (1858), "Extract from the journal of Thomas Dineley, Esq., giving some account of his visits to Ireland in the reign of Charles II", Journal of the Kilkenny Archaeological Society, New, 1 (1): 22–32, JSTOR 25502503
- O'Donovan, John (1859), "Irish correspondence of James FitzMaurice of Desmond", Journal of the Kilkenny Archaeological Society, New, 2 (2): 354–69, JSTOR 25502569

Religious works and figures

- O'Donovan, John (1846), "An ancient poem attributed to St Columbkille", Miscellany of the Irish Archæological Society, pp. 1–15
- O'Donovan, John (1857), "The registry of Clonmacnoise", Journal of the Kilkenny Archaeological Society, New, 1 (2): 444–60, JSTOR 25502530
- O'Donovan, John; Todd, James Henthorn; Reeves, William, eds. (1864), The Martyrology of Donegal. A Calendar of the Saints of Ireland, translated by O'Donovan, John, Dublin: The Irish Archaeological and Celtic Society

== See also ==
- Mícheál Ó Cléirigh
- James Ussher
- Dubhaltach Mac Fhirbhisigh
- Eoin MacNeill
