= O'Dowd =

Irish Gaelic clan

O'Dowd Ó Dubhda
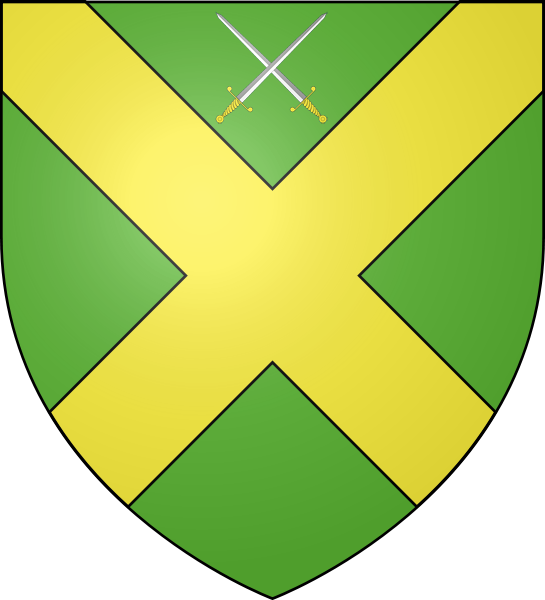
- Armorial of O'Dowd
- Parent house: Uí Fiachrach
- Country: Kingdom of Connacht
- Founder: Dubda mac Connmhach
- Current head: Kieran L. O'Dowd
- Final ruler: Tadhg Riabhach Ó Dubhda
- Titles: Kings of Connacht; Kings of Ui Fiachrach Muaidhe; Lord of Tireragh

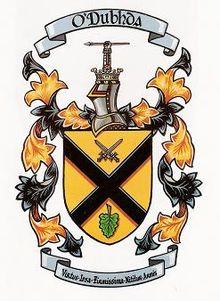
Ó Dubhda Clan Coat of Arms

O'Dowd (Irish: Ó Dubhda) is an Irish Gaelic clan based most prominently in what is today County Mayo and County Sligo. The clan name originated in the 9th century as a derivative of its founder Dubda mac Connmhach. The O'Dowd clan can be traced to the Doonfeeney area of what is now the parish of Ballycastle in Co. Mayo. A large earthen ring fortificatiation still exists called 'Rath O'Dubhda". The nearby early ecclesiastical site at Doonfeeney was more than likely developed under the patronage of the O'Dowds. They descend in the paternal line from the Connachta's Uí Fiachrach. The immediate progenitors of the O'Dowd were Kings of Connacht during the 7th and 8th centuries in the form of Dúnchad Muirisci, Indrechtach mac Dúnchado, Ailill Medraige mac Indrechtaig and Donn Cothaid mac Cathail, before losing ground to their rivals the Uí Briúin.

Genealogically, they are closely related to the O'Shaughnessy, MacFirbis, O’Finnerty (Ó Fiannachta) all members of Clan Conway (i.e. Connmhach). Indeed, the O'Dowd were the main patrons of the MacFirbis clan who produced key works of Irish history such as the Great Book of Lecan and the Leabhar na nGenealach. From the 8th to the 15th centuries, the O'Dowd were Kings of Ui Fiachrach Muaidhe, a sub-kingdom within the Kingdom of Connacht. After their realm was incorporated into the Kingdom of Ireland, they were Lord of Tír Fhiacrach

== Naming conventions ==
Male	Daughter	Wife (Long)	Wife (Short)
Ó Dubhda	Ní Dhubhda	Bean Uí Dhubhda	Uí Dhubhda

O'Dowd is the most common anglicisation of the Irish surname Ó Dubhda. Other anglicised variants are Dowd, Dawdy, Dowdy, O'Dowda and Dowds, with Doody and Duddy, found around Killarney, where a branch of the Connacht family settled. All are Ó Dubhda (pronounced O Dooda) in Irish, the root word being "dubh" black. A quite distinct minor sept of Ó Dubhda was located in County Londonderry. Descendants of this sept in Ulster today are usually anglicised as Duddy, Dowd or Dowds.

== Annalistic references ==
- AI1126.12 Ua Dubda, king of Uí Amalgada, was drowned along with the crews of two coracles.
- AI1127.11 Gilla Críst Ua Dubda of Cenél Eógain Aelaig died.

== History ==
The O'Dowd clan or sept traces its descent from Fiachrae, an older half-brother of Niall of the Nine Hostages, through Nath Í mac Fiachrach (aka Dathí), the last pagan High King of Ireland. Irish legend and early texts claim Dathí was killed by a bolt of lightning as he led an army to the foot of the Alps in 455 AD. His grandson Aillil succeeded as King of Connacht and later King of Tara until 482.

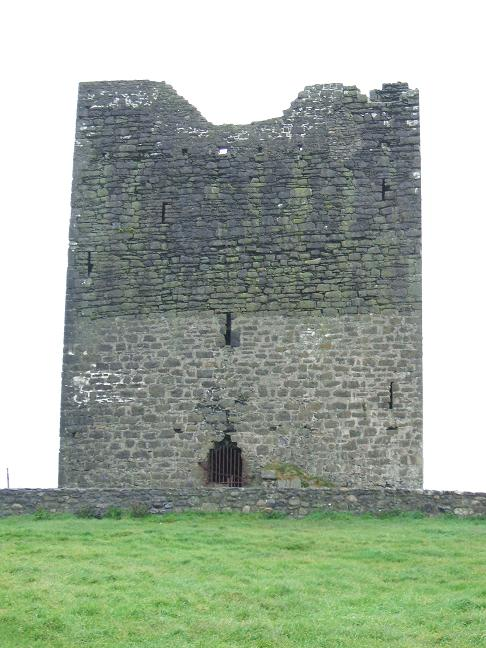
The ruins of the O'Dowd castle Rosslee. This is castle No:10 and is located just on the seaward side of the village of Easky in Sligo. Photo: Subritzky Collection 2007

For centuries they were the leading sept of the northern Uí Fiachrach, a tribal group that occupied the modern counties of Mayo and Sligo. The Uí Fiachrach provided successive kings of Connacht for a long period, but their sphere of influence became confined to North Connacht. In the late 10th century, their king was named Aedh Ua Dubhda (Hugh O'Dooda). He is recorded as having 'died an untroubled death' in the year 982, making this surname one of the oldest in Europe. His grandson, Mulrony, who died in 1005 had the title of Lord of Hyfiachrach. The O'Dowds were a maritime power of considerable ability in the twelfth and thirteenth centuries. On land they managed to hold their territory intact against the superior forces of the Burkes and Birminghams. Their territory at its widest embraced the túatha of Erris and Tír Amhlaidh in Mayo and Tir Fhiacrach Múaidhe in Sligo. They forged a kingdom in Uí Fiachrach Muaidhe (Northwest Connacht) which they ringed with 20 castles, often referred to as "10-Pound Castles," and held off all comers for centuries until the incursion of the Anglo-Normans.

The style and design of these small Irish castles is said to have originated from a subsidy of 10-Pounds which was granted by Henry IV in 1429. However, many of the O'Dowd castles have a far more ancient history of being built directly over the site of Stone Age and Bronze Age fortifications.

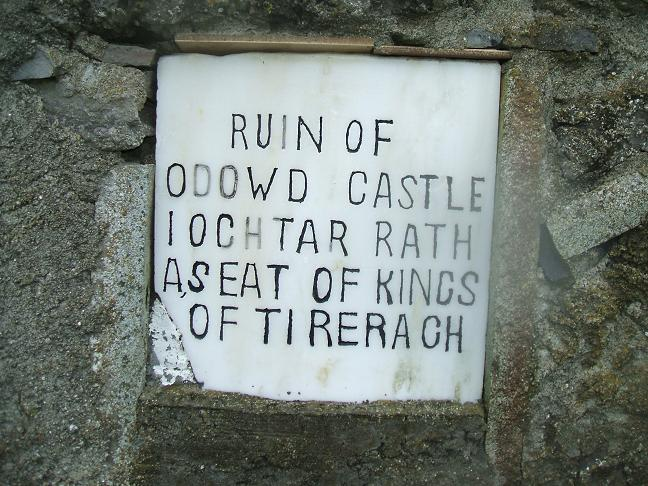
This marble memorial to the O'Dowd Kings is mounted into the wall of Rathlee castle. Photo: Subritzky Collection 2007.

They were traditionally inaugurated as princes of Ui Fiachrach at Carn Amhalghaigh near Killala, on the east shore of Killala Bay near the border of Sligo and Mayo. They were considerably reduced by the Anglo-Norman incursion into Connacht in the thirteenth century but were still powerful and in 1354 Sen-Bhrian O'Dowd succeeded in driving all the Anglo-Norman settlers out of Tireragh for a time.

The O'Dowds are unique in having left a detailed account of the inauguration ceremony of their Taoiseach (clan leader). This was written in an ancient manuscript known as the Great Book of Lecan, written near Enniscrone in Tireragh between 1397 and 1418 and now carefully preserved in Dublin. The inaugural ceremony of each succeeding O'Dowd was presided over by a MacFirbis, the hereditary chroniclers of the clan. One of the most generous sponsors of the MacFirbis scholars was Tadhg Riabhach Ó Dubhda ('Dark Teige'), who became Taoiseach of Tireragh in 1417. He is particularly remembered in this manuscript where his death is recorded at Enniscrone Castle.

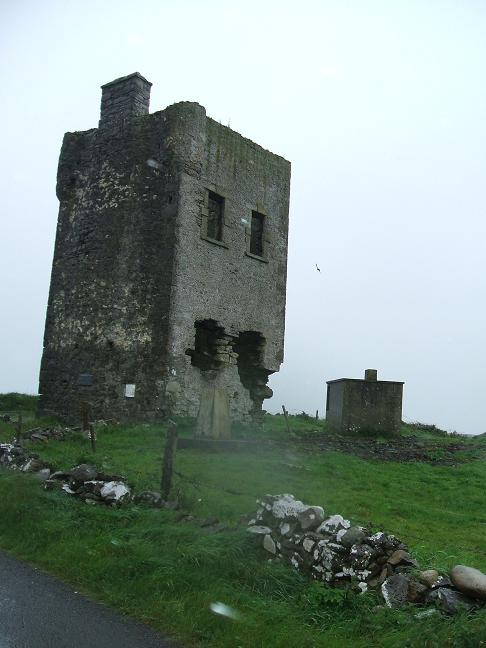
The ruins of the O'Dowd castle Rathlee. This is castle No:09 and is located close to the harbour of Rathlee village in Sligo. Photo: Subritzky Collection 2007.

The last election of an O'Dowd Taoiseach took place in 1595. By this time they were simply a client clan of the O'Connor clan of Sligo. This coincided with the Nine Years War, when the last independent Irish clans rose to resist English occupation of Ulster. The clan played an honourable role in the war, assisting Hugh Roe O'Donnell, in defending the western border of Ulster from incursions by the Earl of Essex in 1599 (most probably at the Battle of Curlew Pass). With the Irish defeat in 1603, their power rapidly dwindled and they were deprived of most of their patrimonial possessions. Daithi Óg O'Dowd, who married in 1636, was the last generation of O'Dowds given by MacFirbis in his pedigree of the clan. This also coincides with historical events – namely the Cromwellian reconquest (1642) following Ulster's 1641 revolt.

From the rarity of the surname today, one must conclude that these successive wars, particularly those in the 17th century against the English, and the subsequent savage repression, greatly diminished O'Dowd numbers along with their power and influence.

Several O'Dowds were bishops of the see of Killala. Father John Ó Duada, who was tortured and hanged in 1579, was one of the many Irish Franciscan martyrs. Many of the name appear in the ranks of the Confederate Catholics and, later in the seventeenth century, in Catholic King James II of England's army during the Williamite war in Ireland (1688–1691). The head of the sept at that time, who was killed at the Battle of the Boyne (1690), is said to have been seven feet tall.

The O'Dowd castle was built in Carn Amhalghaigh in 1477. The O'Dowds occupied the castle until the Cromwellian re-conquest. The castle was used as a Williamite military base during the later war and ceased to be inhabited shortly thereafter. A smaller keep was built at Castleconner near Ballina in 1520 by Conor O'Dowd, the Taoiseach of the time. Both castles are now in ruins.

The noted Irish genealogiest, Dubhaltach Mac Fhirbhisigh, was the last of the 'senchai' or hereditary historicans to the family. He was murdered in 1671.

== Chief of the Name ==
- Brian Ó Dubhda; U1446.4: Brian Ua Dubda was slain by the Tir-Amhalghaidh.
- Maol Ruanaidh mac Ruaidhrí Ó Dubhda, d. 1450 (18)
- Domhnall Baile Ui Choitil Ó Dubhda, 1447–1454 (7)
- Tadhg Buidhe mac Tadhg Riabhach Ó Dubhda, c. 1454-c.1457 (3)
- Seaán Glas mac Tadhg Riabhach Ó Dubhda, c.1457–71?(14)
- Éamonn mac An Cosnamhach Ó Dubhda (5 and a half weeks) c. 1466?
- Domhnall Ballach Ó Dubhda, (1), c. 1472?
- Brian Cam mac An Cosnmhach Ó Dubhda, (2) c.1472-c.1474?
- Eóghan Caoch mac Ruaidhrí Ó Dubhda (14), c. 1474-c.1488?
- Uilliam mac Domhnall Ballach Ó Dubhda, (half a year) c. 1488?
- Brian Óg Ó Dubhda, (half a year) c. 1488?
- Donnchadh Ultach Ó Dubhda (1), c. 1489?
- Maghnus mac Tadhg Buidhe Ó Dubhda, (1), c. 1490?
- Owen Caech Ó Dubhda, died 1495.
- Uilliam Dubh Ó Dubhda, died 1496 (LCe;1496. Ó Dubhda, Dubh, i.e. William, the son of Domhnall Ballach, died.)
- Féilim mac Tadhg Buidhe Ó Dubhda, (19), c. 1490?-c. 1509?
- Conchabhar mac Diarmaid mac Maol Ruanaidh Ó Dubhda (30), c. 1509?-c.1549?
- Éoghan mac Conchabhar Ó Dubhda, (7), c. 1549?–1556?
- Cathal Dubh mac Conchabhar Ó Dubhda, c.1556?-?
- Cathal Dubh mac Conchabhar Ó Dubhda, d. 1582.
- Dathí Ruadh Ó Dubhda, d. 1594.
- Dathí mac Dathí Ruadh Ó Dubhda, 1591-c.1660
- Dathí Óge Ó Dubhda, fl. 1656–1705.
- Dominick O'Dowda, d. 1737.
- Thady fitz Dominick O'Dowda, d. 1767.
- James Vippler O'Dowda, Baron O'Dowda, ex. 1798.
- Thady O'Dowd, fl. 1854.
- Braeden Dowd, ex. 1802
- John Taaffe O'Dowd, d. 1895.
- John Charles Haughton O'Dowd, d. 1916.
- Albert Frederick O'Dowd, d. 1941.
- Robert Francis O'Dowd, d. 1998.
- Robert Frederick O'Dowd, d. 2017.
- Sean R O'Dowd
- Hannah Michelle O'Dowd
- Colin Patrick O'Dowd

See also Kings of Ui Fiachrach Muaidhe

== O'Dowd Castles ==
The kingdom of the O'Dowds was ringed by 20 castles, most of which are now in ruins. The location of these castles are as follows: No:1 Lough Conn; No:2 Mount Balcon, River Moy; No:3 Beaufield; No:4 Belleek Castle, Ballina; No:5 Castleconor, River Moy; No:6 Castleton Manor; No:7 Enniscrone; No:8 Carahduff; No:9 Rathlee; No:10 Rosslee, Easkey; No:11 Dromore; No:12 Doonecoy; No:13 Cartron; No:14 Dromard; No:15 Lomford; No:16 Flooneen; No:17 Ballymote; No:18 Markcree; No:19 Lough Gill; No:20 Drumcliff Bay.

These castles and ruins were researched and located over many years by the Clan O'Dowd historian, Conor Mac Hale. The O'Dowdas (O'Dowds) were chieftains of west Sligo in Anglo-Norman times and they built the Castle in Ballina, Co Mayo in 1447. The O'Dowds occupied the castle until the Cromwellian era (17th century). The castle is of three stories. Two of the main features are the subsidiary turrets that are situated on diagonally opposed corners. The outside measurements are approx. 20m in length and 10m wide. The thickness of the walls varies between 1.65m and 2.13m.

The castle has been renovated over the years and two chimneys were added in the seventeenth century. Many of the original archer slits remain intact. After the eviction of the O'Dowds during the Cromwellian Plantation of the 1650s the castle and lands were given to Robert Morgan. It was used as a military site for the Williamite army during the war between the Catholic King James and the Protestant William of Orange. At the close of the 17th century the castle ceased to be inhabited.

== Nottingham O'Dowds ==
Formed Pre WWI the Nottingham O'Dowds are a large Family. Edward O'Dowd's grandfather moved from Ireland at an unknown date. Edward then went on to marry Lucy and between them had 9 children. Two girls and seven boys, the eldest also named Edward. The eldest daughter is Joyce followed by Patrick O'Dowd. The names of the rest of the Nottingham O'Dowd children are Terry, Peter, Barry, Diane, Anthony and Trevor. There are estimated to be around 20 families of O'Dowd in and around Nottingham to this day.

== Argentine O'Dowds ==
There are at least three families named Dowd (or O'Dowd), whose descendants are currently living in Argentina. One family descends from James Dowd who was born in Dublin in 1828, and who is recorded as marrying Mary Ann Heery. Another family descends from Michael Dowd who was born in Westmeath in 1824, and he is recorded as marrying Eileen Burke. The third family descends from another Michael Dowd who is said to have been born in Ireland in 1804. There is yet another Dowd branch in Argentina, that of Edward O'Dowd, married to Kathleen Lynch in Ireland (date unknown) parents of Edward Michael O'Dowd (born 1856 or 1857 in Westmeath). Edward emigrated to Argentina and settled in Navarro, Provincia de Buenos Aires, working in a farm. He married Mary Kelly Moran (whose parents were William Kelly and Anne Moran, both born in Ireland, emigrated to Argentina) and had 4 children: Anne "Annie" Dowd, Kathleen "Kitty" Dowd, Edward Dowd and John Dowd. Annie, Kitty and John died childless. Edward married Winifred Lucy Reynolds (born in New Zealand 16 April 1898), and died only 53 days later. Winifred was pregnant and gave birth to Eduardo José Dowd on 31 March 1931, who, in turn married Mercedes García (born in Asturias, Spain on 19 December 1931). They had 5 children, who live in Argentina.

== New Zealand O'Dowds ==
The New Zealand branch of the O'Dowds (and Dowds), are descended from Patrick O'Dowd and Anna (née: Kenny). Patrick O'Dowd was born in Easky, Sligo in Ireland in 1805. He enlisted into the 97th Regiment of Foot (The Earl of Ulster's – also known as the "Celestials" due to the colour of their flashes on their uniforms) in 1824, aged 16. He was a Private and served 16 years in the British Army, including 11 years with the Regiment in Ceylon. Upon his retirement from the British Army he was living in Manchester with his wife Anna and 4 children. He enlisted into The Royal New Zealand Fencibles (from the word defencible) and sailed for New Zealand from Gravesend on 1 July 1847, with his family aboard the "SS Minerva," arriving in the Port of Auckland 8 October 1847. This was the 2nd Detachment of Fencibles and included 80 Fencibles, 67 wives and 145 children.

There are about 180 families living in New Zealand, mainly in the Auckland region who bear the surname O'Dowd or Dowd. Craig Dowd the well known All Black is one of these descendants.

== Modern Clan O'Dowd Chieftains ==
Since 1990, members of the O'Dubhda Clan from various countries have gathered periodically to mark their shared ancestry, observe traditional customs, and elect a chieftain following the framework of Brehon Law.

- Thomas J. Dowds (1997–2003)
- Richard F. Dowd (2003–2006)
- Edward P. O'Dowd (2006–2009)
- Michael F. Dowd (2009–2012)
- Brendan O'Dowd (2012–2015)
- Andrew Dowds (2015–2018)
- Kieran O'Dowd (2018–2022)
- Colum O'Dowd (2022-present)

== Arms ==
O'Hart records two arms for members of the family. One in what is today County Mayo (the senior branch) and the other in Sligo.

Princes of Hy-Fiachra (Mayo)

- ARMS – Vert a saltire or, in chief two swords in saltire, points upwards, the dexter surmounted of the sinister argent, pommels and hilts gold.
- CREST – over a coronet, a dexter hand in armour, holding a dart, proper.
- SUPPORTERS – two lions rampant
- MOTTO – "Virtus Ipsa Suis Firmissima Nititur Armis" (Bravery is Best Sustained by Arms). Irish: Bíonn crógacht is seasmhaí faoi chothú arm

Princes of Hy-Fiachra (Sligo)

- ARMS – or a saltier sable, in chief two swords in saltier, points upwards, the dexter surmounted of the sinister argent, pommels and hilts gold, in base and oak leaf, the stalk upwards, vert.
- CREST – over a coronet, a dexter hand in armour, holding a dart, proper.
- SUPPORTERS – two lions rampant
- MOTTO – "Virtus Ipsa Suis Firmissima Nititur Armis" (Bravery is Best Sustained by Arms). Irish: Bíonn crógacht is seasmhaí faoi chothú arm

== People ==
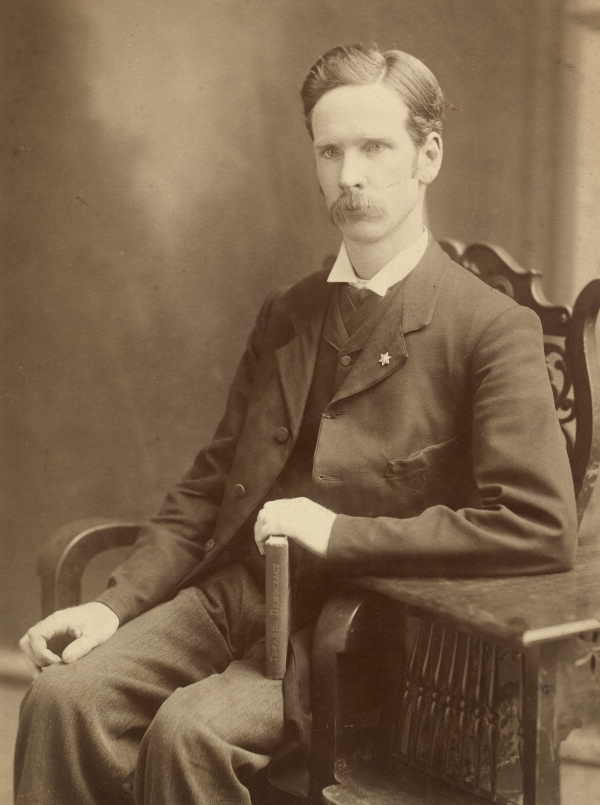
Bernard O'Dowd (c.1904)

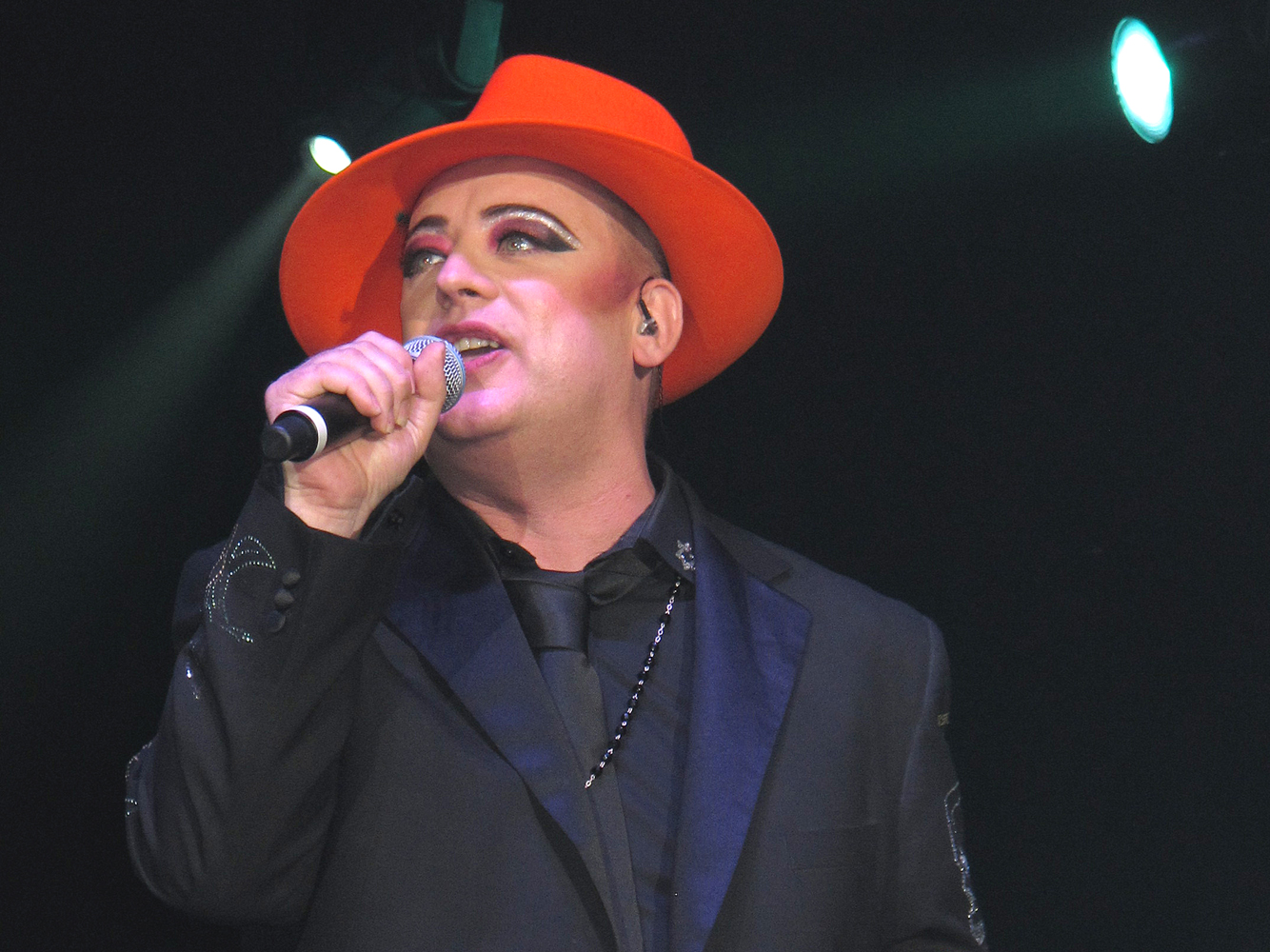
Boy George (2011) photo:Andrew Hurley

For people named Dowd please see Dowd

- Alex O'Dowd (1967), professional first-class rugby coach and former New Zealand first-class cricketer
- Anna Mae O'Dowd, former professional baseball player
- Bernard O'Dowd (1866–1953) Australian activist, educator, poet, journalist and author
- Boy George (born George Alan O'Dowd, 1961), British singer-songwriter
- Cathy O'Dowd, South African rock climber, mountaineer, author and motivational speaker
- Chris O'Dowd (1979), Irish actor and comedian
- Christopher O'Dowd (1920–1943), founding member of the British SAS.
- Colin O'Dowd (1966), Irish physicist and atmospheric scientist
- Dan O'Dowd (1959), former general manager of the Colorado Rockies
- David O'Dowd (1942), former chief inspector of constabulary for England and Wales
- Donald O'Dowd (1927), American academic
- Fergus O'Dowd (1948), Irish Fine Gael politician
- James Cornelius O'Dowd (1829–1903), Anglo-Irish barrister and deputy judge advocate general
- James Thomas O'Dowd (1907–1950), a bishop of the Catholic Church in the United States
- John Dowd (born John Leo O'Dowd (1891–1981)), Major League Baseball shortstop
- John O'Dowd (1856–1937), Irish Nationalist Member of Parliament for North Sligo
- John O'Dowd (1967), Irish Sinn Féin politician
- Ken O'Dowd (1950), Australian politician
- Kevin O'Dowd, New Jersey public servant and political figure
- Kris O'Dowd (1988), former American football center
- Max O'Dowd (1994), international cricketer playing for the Netherlands
- Mick O'Dowd, former Gaelic footballer and former senior manager for Meath
- Mike O'Dowd (1895–1957), American middleweight boxer
- Nace O'Dowd (1931–1987), Gaelic footballer who played for the County Sligo team in the 1950s
- Niall O'Dowd (1953), Irish journalist and author living in the United States
- Patrick O'Dowd (1968), Irish politician and medical practitioner
- Peter O'Dowd (1908–1964), English professional footballer
- Robert Dowd (1936–1996) (aka Robert O'Dowd), American artist
- Seamie O'Dowd, Irish folk musician, Cty Sligo
- Timmy O'Dowd(1963), Irish Gaelic footballer who played for the County Kerry team
- Thomas Paul O'Dowd (1886–1930), superintendent, City of San Francisco, California, US
- Tony O'Dowd (1970), Irish soccer player who played for Leeds Utd and Rep. of Ireland U 21's
- Sally O'Dowd (artist) (1980), Visual artist & curator
- Matthew D. Dowd (2002), Hobby Council Coordinator
