= Brian Ó Dubhda =

Brian Ó Dubhda (died 1446) was Chief of the Name and Lord of Tireragh.

== From kings to warlords ==
Brian was the last but one Ó Dubhda till Owen Caech Ó Dubhda (died 1495) to be mentioned in the annals. Tadhg Riabhach Ó Dubhda, the previous Ó Dubhda, was the last one referred to as a king of any territory. From the mid-15th century they were referred to as The Ó Dubhda, or Lord of Tireragh (now north-west County Sligo).

== Succession ==
The succession to the chieftainship becomes obscured, with the main source for the next hundred years, Araile do fhlathaibh Ua nDubhda, listing the length of reigns of chiefs, rather than by year. Some of these chiefs were rulers in opposition to each other, and almost none are noted in the annals. The last one listed, Cathal Dubh mac Conchabhar Ó Dubhda, appears to have lived in the 1550s, by which time the family begin to appear regularly in Irish State Papers.

== Annalistic reference ==
Brian is only referred to in the Annals of Ulster, which says of him:

- U1446.4: Brian Ua Dubda was slain by the Tir-Amhalghaidh.

| Preceded by Tadhg Riabhach Ó Dubhda? | Ó Dubhda; 1432?–1446 | Succeeded by Maol Ruanaidh mac Ruaidhrí Ó Dubhda? |
