= Dubh Essa Bean Uí Dubhda =

Dubh Essa Bean Uí Dubhda (died 1190) was a queen of Ui Fiachrach Muaidhe.

== Biography ==
Her husband, An Cosnmhaidh Ua Dubhda, was assassinated in 1162. The Annals of Loch Ce mention her death in 1190: "Duibhessa, daughter of Diarmaid, son of Tadhg, wife of the Cosnamhach O'Dubhda, mortua est."

== See also ==
- Dubh Essa
- Kings of Ui Fiachrach Muaidhe
- O'Dowd
