= Caomhán mac Connmhach =

Gift of givers

Caomhán mac Connmhach, Eponym and Ancestor of the Clan Ó Caomháin of north Connacht, fl. 9th-10th century. The surname is variously anglicised as Keevan, Kevane, Keeveen, Keevans, Keaven, Keavan, Cavan.

== Family background ==
Caomhán mac Connmhach and Dubda mac Connmhach were grandsons of King Donn Cothaid mac Cathail of Ui Fiachrach Muaidhe (died 772). Their father was Connchmach mac Donn Cothaid mac Cathail, who traced his descent back to the semi-legendary Niall Noígíallach (died c. 450?), via his son, Fiachu mac Néill (fl. 507-514). This made Caomhán a member of the Uí Fiachrach dynasty who produced a number of Kings of Connacht.

== Division of land ==
According to Dubhaltach Mac Fhirbhisigh (263.8):

Caomhán was older than Dubhda and Caomhán thought that the kingship [of Uí Fiachrach Muaidhe] was his; but God did not will that there should be kings of his progeny; and they made an arrangement about the kingship, i.e. that Caomhán's representative should have a choice of territory as his patrimony and (the right to be at) the shoulder of the king of Ui Fhiachrach always, [the possession of] his steeds and accoutrements when he is inaugurated, and [the right to] proceed around him three times after his inauguration; and the territory that he chose was from Tuaim Dhá Bhodhar to Gleóir. The steed, accoutrements, and the clothes of Ó Caomháin are to be given to Mac Fir Bhisigh on the day that Mac Fir Bhisigh calls Ó Dubhda by the name of lord.

== Descendants ==
Mac Fhirbhisigh, at 264.1 (pp. 598–99) states that he had a son, Cathal, and at 264.2 (pp. 598–99) gives the following genealogy:

"Dáibhídh and Domhnall sons of Aodh s. Dáibhídh s. Tomás s. Giolla na Naomh s. Domhnall s. Dáibhídh s. Diarmuid s. Tomás s. Domhnall s. Tomás s. Giolla na Naomh s. Diarmuid s. Domhnall s. Cathal s. Giolla na Naomh. s. Diarmuid s. Cathal s. Caomhán, from whom are Uí Chaomháin, s. Connmhach s. Donn Cathaigh, etc."

This is followed by two further genealogies:

"Tomaltach, Maghnus, Donnchadh, Aodh Fionn, and Seaán, the five sons of Dáibhídh, son of that Aodh."

"Tomás Óg, Tomaltach, Niall, and Cathal Riabhach:those are the offspring of Tomás Mór s. Dáibhídh s. Giolla na Naomh Mór."

== Privileges and territory ==
At 270.1-2, Leabhar na nGenealach gives an account of the privileges of Clann Chaomháin. At 271.21 (pp. 614–615), Mac Fhirbhisigh lists the patrimony of Ó Caomháin in Carra, County Mayo as "the seven townlands of Ros Laogh, from Cluain Lis (or Leasa) Néilín to Béal Átha na Lúb, and from Béal Átha na gCarr to Muileann Toirmáin, which were obtained by Caomhán s. Connmhach from Dubhda, his brother, and by Aodh Ó Caomháin from Aodh s. Ceallach, gs. {grandson of} Dubhda, king of Uí Fhiachrach; ... and it has been the native and inherent property of Uí Chamoháin ever since, as are many other territories besides."

At 274.10 (pp. 620–621), Mac Fhirbhisgh states The territory of Ó Caomháin is from Tuaim Dhá Bhodhar to Gleóir, and its native families are Mac Caoilleacháin, from An Carn and Ó Coitil from Baile Uí Choitil." At 274.19 and into 275.1, he goes on to state that "The chief sea of Ó Caomháin is Saidhin Uisce tar Abhainn, which is called Inis Screabhainn; although Clann Néill" (a branch of the O'Dowds) "is considered to have conquered that territory, it is not through native right that they took it but by force following the killing of Dáibhidh Ó Caomháin and Domhnall Ó Caomháin, whereupon Clann Néill were in the chieftaincy for a period, and Niall [g]s. Niall was killed by Muircheartach Fionn Ó Caomháin in revenge for [the loss of] his land." At 276.11 Inis Screabhainn, noted as both the foregoing and Soighean Uise tar Abhainn, is called "The chief homestead of Ó Caomháin."

275.17 states "Ó Loingsigh and Ó Caomháin of An Cuirreach from Muine na bhFiadh (or Muine Dhiadh is its name today."

== High Medieval era ==
Following the Anglo-Irish invasion and settlement of Connacht in the middle decades of the 12th-century, families such as the Clann Chaomháin lost their territories, been exiled or becoming tenants-at-will under the new lords. King Sén-Brian Ó Dubhda of Ui Fiachrach Muaidhe (died 1354) regained much of these territories but mostly allotted them to his own followers.

== Annalistic references ==
Caomhán himself does not appear in the annals, and few of his descendants feature in the extant Irish annals. The Annals of the Four Masters contains a references under the year 1294, stating that Dermot O'Caomhain died.

A more fulsome entry, sub anno, 1306, occurs in the same annal:

A great depredation was committed by the Clann-Murtough O'Conor in the territory of Carbury. David O'Caomhain, Chief of that tract of country extending from Tuaim-da-Bhodar to Gleóir, a rich and affluent brughaidh farmer, Donough Mac Buidheachain, and many others, were slain on this predatory incursion.
