= Brian Cam mac An Cosnmhach Ó Dubhda =

Brian Cam mac An Cosnmhach Ó Dubhda, Chief of the Name and Lord of the Tireragh barony in Ireland, fl c. 1474?

Almost the only document dealing with the succession as the Ó Dubhda chief of the name is Araile do fhlathaibh Ua nDubhda, which presents many chronological difficulties. Even when dates and/or lengths of reigns are given, they can only be appromiximated as some chiefs may have ruled in opposition to each other.

Araile gives Brian "2" years.

He would appear to have been a brother of Éamonn mac An Cosnamhach Ó Dubhda.

Preceded by Domhnall Ballach Ó Dubhda	Ó Dubhda; 1474?–1474?	Succeeded by Eóghan Caoch mac Ruaidhrí Ó Dubhda
