= Seaán Glas mac Tadhg Riabhach Ó Dubhda =

Irish Chief of the Name

Seaán Glas mac Tadhg Riabhach Ó Dubhda (died c. 1471) was Chief of the Name and Lord of Tireragh.

Almost the only document dealing with the succession as the Ó Dubhda chief of the name is Araile do fhlathaibh Ua nDubhda, which presents many chronological difficulties. Even when dates and/or lengths of reigns are given, they can only be appromiximated as some chiefs may have ruled in opposition to each other.

Araile gives Seaán Glas "14" years.

Preceded by Tadhg Buidhe mac Tadhg Riabhach Ó Dubhda	Ó Dubhda; 1457?–1471?	Succeeded by Éamonn mac An Cosnamhach Ó Dubhda
