= Mael Ruanaidh Ua Dubhda =

Mael Ruanaidh Ua Dubhda, died 1005.

== Annanlistic references ==
- 1005. Maelruanaidh, son of Aedh Ua Dubhda, lord of Ui-Fiachrach-Muirisge, and his son, i.e. Maelseachlainn, and his brother, i.e. Gebhennach, son of Aedh, died.

Preceded by Aed Ua Dubhda	Kings of Ui Fiachrach Muaidhe; 983?–1005	Succeeded by Aedhuar Ua Dubhda
