= Ruaidhrí Mear Ua Dubhda =

Irish king, 12th century

Ruaidhrí Mear Ua Dubhda (fl. 1143 – 1162) was King of Ui Fiachrach Muaidhe.

Ruaidhrí Mear was a son of Taichleach mac Niall Ua Dubhda. No dates exist for his reign, but Araile do fhlathaibh Ua nDubhda places him between Aodh mac Muirchertach Ua Dubhda (died 1143) and An Cosnmhaidh Ua Dubhda, called him ri o Roba go Codnuigh("king from [the rivers] Roba to Codhnach").

| Preceded by Aodh mac Muirchertach Ua Dubhda | Kings of Ui Fiachrach Muaidhe ?–? | Succeeded by An Cosnmhaidh Ua Dubhda |
