= Domhnall Ballach Ó Dubhda =

Domhnall Ballach Ó Dubhda (died c. 1472) was Chief of the Name and Lord of Tireragh.

Almost the only document dealing with the succession as the Ó Dubhda chief of the name is Araile do fhlathaibh Ua nDubhda, which presents many chronological difficulties. Even when dates and/or lengths of reigns are given, they can only be appromiximated as some chiefs may have ruled in opposition to each other.

Araile gives Domhnall Ballach "1" year.

Preceded by Éamonn mac An Cosnamhach Ó Dubhda	Ó Dubhda; 1472?	Succeeded by Brian Cam mac An Cosnmhach Ó Dubhda
