= Tadhg Buidhe mac Tadhg Riabhach Ó Dubhda =

Gaelic lord (died c. 1457)

Tadhg Buidhe mac Tadhg Riabhach Ó Dubhda (died c. 1457) Chief of the Name and Lord of Tireragh.

Almost the only document dealing with the succession of the Ó Dubhda chief of the name is Araile do fhlathaibh Ua nDubhda, which presents many chronological difficulties. Even when dates and/or lengths of reigns are given, they can only be approximated as some chiefs may have ruled in opposition to each other.

Araile gives Tadhg Buidhe "3 years."

Preceded by Domhnall Baile Ui Choitil Ó Dubhda	Ó Dubhda; 1454?–1457?	Succeeded by Seaán Glas mac Tadhg Riabhach Ó Dubhda
