= Domhnall Baile Ui Choitil Ó Dubhda =

Domhnall Baile Ui Choitil Ó Dubhda (died c. 1454) was Chief of the Name and Lord of Tireragh.

Almost the only document dealing with the succession as the Ó Dubhda chief of the name is Araile do fhlathaibh Ua nDubhda, which presents many chronological difficulties. Even when dates and/or lengths of reigns are given, they can only be appromiximated as some chiefs may have ruled in opposition to each other.

Araile states that Domhnall was "of Baile Ui Choitil" and "was made Ó Dubhda for seven years, and in the year 1447."

Preceded by Maol Ruanaidh mac Ruaidhrí Ó Dubhda	Ó Dubhda; 1447?–1454?	Succeeded by Tadhg Buidhe mac Tadhg Riabhach Ó Dubhda
