= Eóghan Caoch mac Ruaidhrí Ó Dubhda =

Eóghan Caoch mac Ruaidhrí Ó Dubhda, Chief of the Name and Lord of Tireragh, died 1488?

Almost the only document dealing with the succession as the Ó Dubhda chief of the name is Araile do fhlathaibh Ua nDubhda, which presents many chronological difficulties. Even when dates and/or lengths of reigns are given, they can only be approximated as some chiefs may have ruled in opposition to each other.

Araile gives Eóghan Caoch mac Ruaidhrí "14" years.

Preceded by Brian Cam mac An Cosnmhach Ó Dubhda	Ó Dubhda; 1474?–1488?	Succeeded by Uilliam mac Domhnall Ballach Ó Dubhda
