= Domnall Find Ua Dubhda =

Domnall Find Ua Dubhda (died 1126) was King of Ui Fiachrach Muaidhe.

== Annalistic reference ==
- 1126. Domhnall Finn Ua Dubhda, lord of Ui-Amhalghadha, was drowned, after he had plundered Tir-Conaill. The Annals of Tigernach have a more fulsome account, stating Domhnall the Fair Ó Dubhda, king of Uí Amalgaidh, Uí Fiachrach and Cera, a man who never gave a refusal to anyone, was drowned in driving a prey out of Tyrconnell.

Preceded by Muirchertach An Cullach Ua Dubhda	Kings of Ui Fiachrach Muaidhe; 1096?–1126	Succeeded by Mac Aodh Ua Dubhda
