= Dowd =

Dowd Arms

Dowd is a derivation of an ancient surname once common in Ireland but now not readily found. The name Dowd is an Anglicisation of the original Ó Dubhda (pronounced [oː ˈd̪ˠuːd̪ˠə]), through its more common form O'Dowd. The Uí Dubhda are one of the Clann Uí Fiachrach, one of the major families of Irish clans.

== Notable people ==
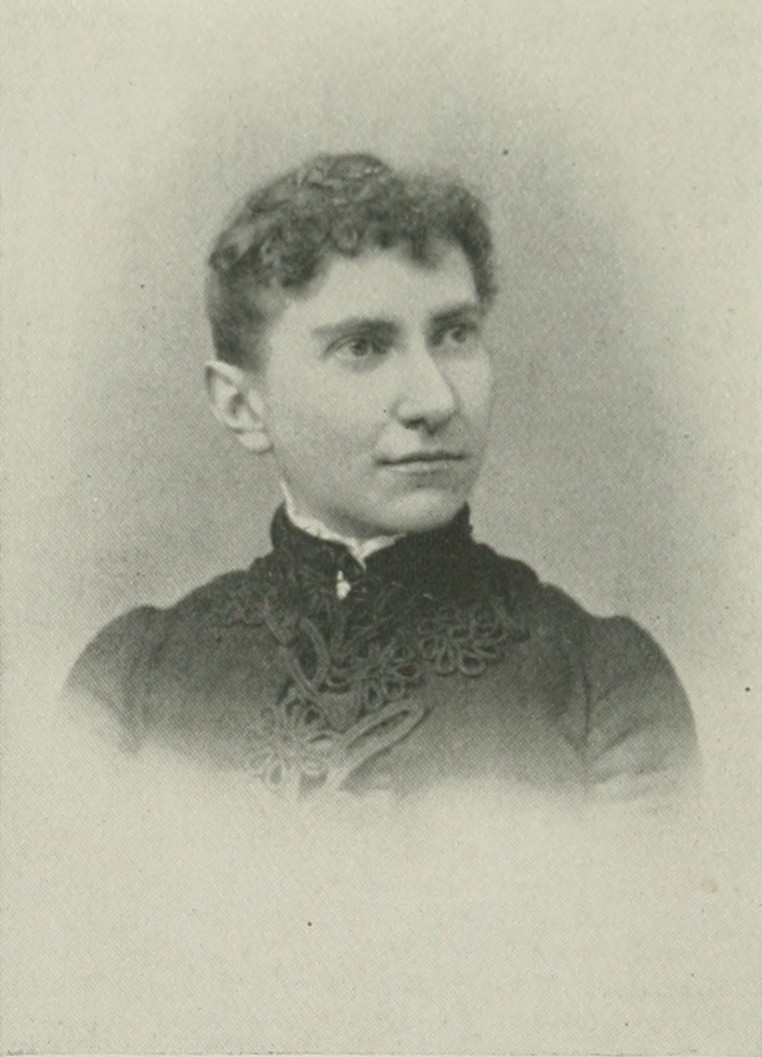
Alice Mary Dowd

- Alice Mary Dowd (1855–1943), educator, author
- Ann Dowd (born 1956), American actress
- Bernard J. Dowd (1891–1971), Mayor of Buffalo, New York
- Charles F. Dowd (1825–1904), American educator who proposed U.S. time zones
- Clement Dowd (1832–1898), American politician
- David Dudley Dowd Jr. (1929–2016), American judge
- Douglas Fitzgerald Dowd (1919–2017), American political economist, economic historian and political activist
- Graham Dowd (born 1963), New Zealand rugby player
- Harry Dowd (1938–2015), English football player
- Hugh Dowd (born 1951), Northern Irish football player
- Jim Dowd (politician) (born 1951), Member of UK Parliament
- Jim Dowd (ice hockey) (born 1968), hockey player
- Jeff Dowd (born 1949), American film producer and political activisten
- Johnny Dowd (born 1948), American country musician
- John Dowd (baseball) (1891–1981), American baseball player
- John Dowd (motorcyclist) (born 1965), American motocross racer
- John Dowd (politician) (born 1940), Australian politician, jurist
- John M. Dowd (born 1941), American lawyer
- Marion Dowd, archaeologist
- Matthew Dowd (born 1961), American campaign advisor and media commentator

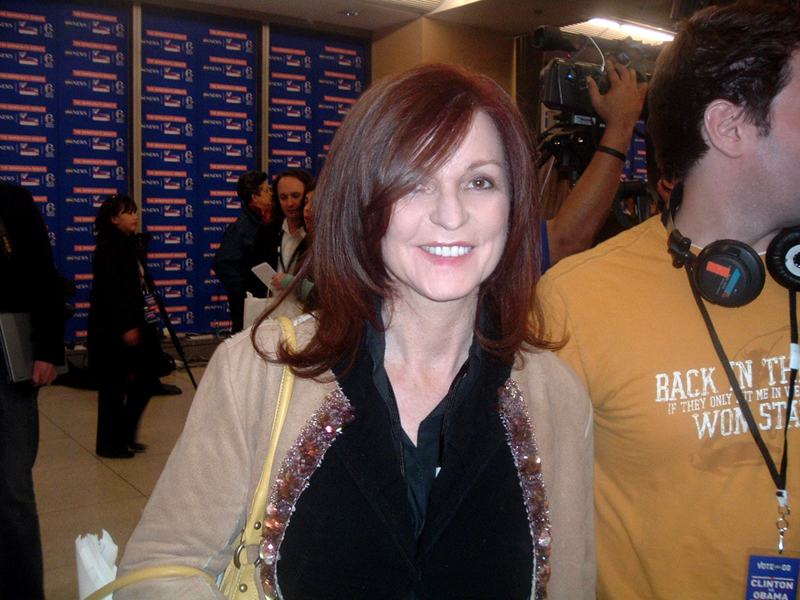
Writer Maureen Dowd

- Maureen Dowd (born 1952), American journalist and Pulitzer Prize-winner
- M'el Dowd (1933–2012), American actress
- Michael Dowd (born 1958), American evolutionary evangelist and author
- Michael Delaney Dowd (1920–2006), American talk show host, known as Mike Douglas
- Nancy Dowd (born 1945), American screenwriter, sister of actor Ned
- Ned Dowd (born 1950), American actor and film producer, brother of Nancy
- Nic Dowd (born 1990), American ice hockey player
- Peter Dowd, English Labour Party politician
- Phil Dowd (born 1963), English football referee
- Robert Dowd (artist) (1936–1996), American painter and sculptor
- Siobhan Dowd (1960–2007), British writer and activist
- Thomas Dowd (bishop) (1960–2007), Canadian Roman Catholic bishop
- Tom Dowd (1925–2002), American recording engineer and producer
- Tommy Dowd (baseball) (1869–1933), American baseball player
- Tommy Dowd (Gaelic footballer) (born 1969), Irish football player
- Wayne Dowd (1941–2016), American lawyer and politician
- William Dowd (1922–2008), American harpsichord maker

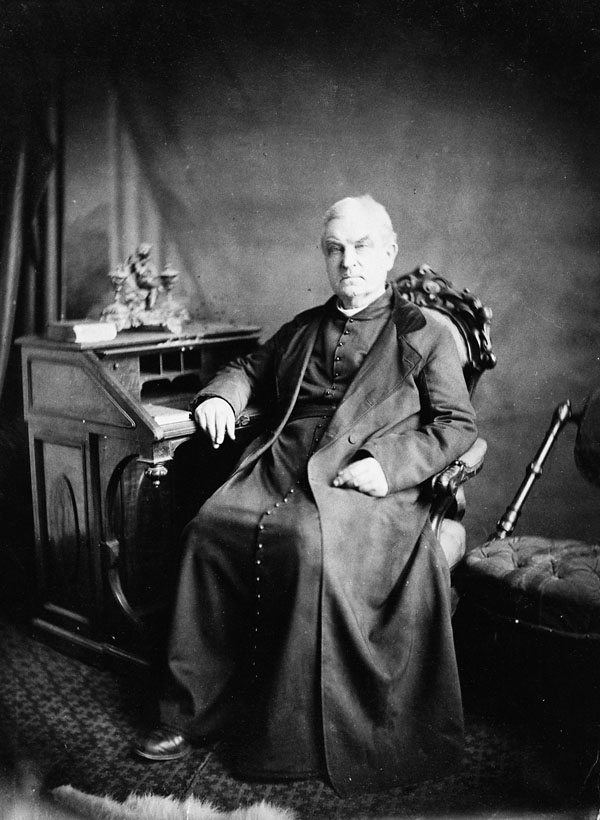
Father Patrick Dowd

== Other ==
- The Dowd Report, a document describing the transgressions of baseball player Pete Rose in betting on baseball
- Irvin v. Dowd (1959), a United States Supreme Court case
- The Dowd–Beckwith ring-expansion reaction, an organic chemical reaction
