= Maol Ruanaidh mac Ruaidhrí Ó Dubhda =

Irish Chief of the Name (died c. 1450)

Maol Ruanaidh mac Ruaidhrí Ó Dubhda (Irish Name), Chief of the Name and Lord of Tireragh, died c. 1450.

Almost the only document dealing with the succession as the Ó Dubhda chief of the name is Araile do fhlathaibh Ua nDubhda, which presents many chronological difficulties. Even when dates and/or lengths of reigns are given, they can only be appromiximated as some chiefs may have ruled in opposition to each other.

Araile stated that Maol Ruanaidh ruled for 18 years and that "The daughter of Mac Goisdeilbh" (Costello) "was his mother. In the year 1432 this man was made Ó Dubhda."

Preceded by Brian Ó Dubhda?	Ó Dubhda; 1432?–1450?	Succeeded by Domhnall Baile Ui Choitil Ó Dubhda?
