= Amhlaibh mac Domhnaill Fhinn Ua Dubhda =

Amhlaibh mac Domhnaill Fhinn Ua Dubhda (died 1135) was King of Ui Fiachrach Muaidhe.

== Annalistic reference ==
- 1135. Amhlaeibh, son of Domhnall Finn Ua Dubhda, lord of Ui-Amhalghadha, was slain by the Ui-Fiachrach of the north.

Preceded by Mac Aodh Ua Dubhda	Kings of Ui Fiachrach Muaidhe; 1128?–1135	Succeeded by Mac Domhnaill Ua Dubhda
