= Conchobair Conallagh Ó Dubhda =

Irish king

Conchobair Ó Dubhda (died 1291) was King of Ui Fiachrach Muaidhe.

== Annalistic references ==
- 1291. Conor O'Dowda (i.e. Conor Conallagh), Lord of Hy-Fiachrach, was drowned in the Shannon.

Preceded by Taichlech mac Maelruanaid Ó Dubhda	Kings of Ui Fiachrach Muaidhe; 1282–1291	Succeeded by Sén-Brian Ó Dubhda
