= Jim White (guitarist) =

American singer (born 1957)

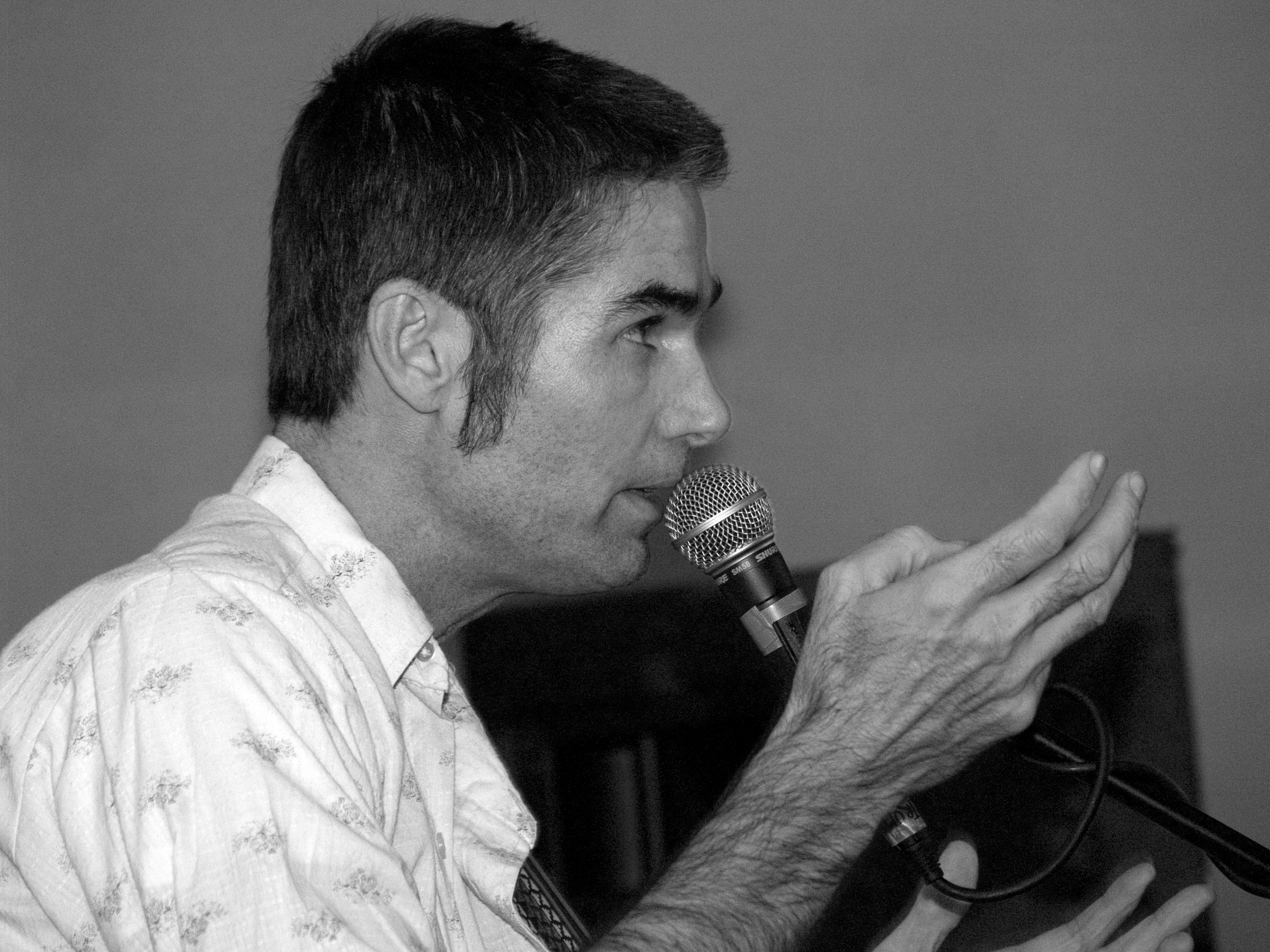
- White in 2007

Background information
- Born: Michael Davis Pratt; March 9, 1957 (age 69); California, U.S.
- Genres: Americana; alternative country; country rock
- Occupations: Guitarist; singer-songwriter; artist; author
- Years active: 1990s–present
- Labels: Loose Music (Europe); Yep Roc (North America)
- Website: jimwhitemusic.net

Michael Davis Pratt (born March 9, 1957), known professionally as Jim White, is an American singer-songwriter, record producer, visual artist and author.

== Early life ==
White was born in California but moved to Pensacola, Florida at the age of 5. He was deeply influenced in his childhood by the spectacle of Pentecostal religion and gospel music. According to various sources, he has been a ditch digger, a suntan oil salesman, a landscaper, a dishwasher, a fry cook, a fashion model, a fashion photographer, a professional surfer and a New York City cab driver. Before embarking on a music career, White attended film school at New York University. Soon after finishing his thesis, White entered a self-described "deep hole of sickness and depression and poverty". It was during this period that White began writing songs again after a long hiatus, many of which would appear on his debut album Wrong Eyed Jesus, released by David Byrne's boutique label Luaka Bop.

== Musical career and performances ==
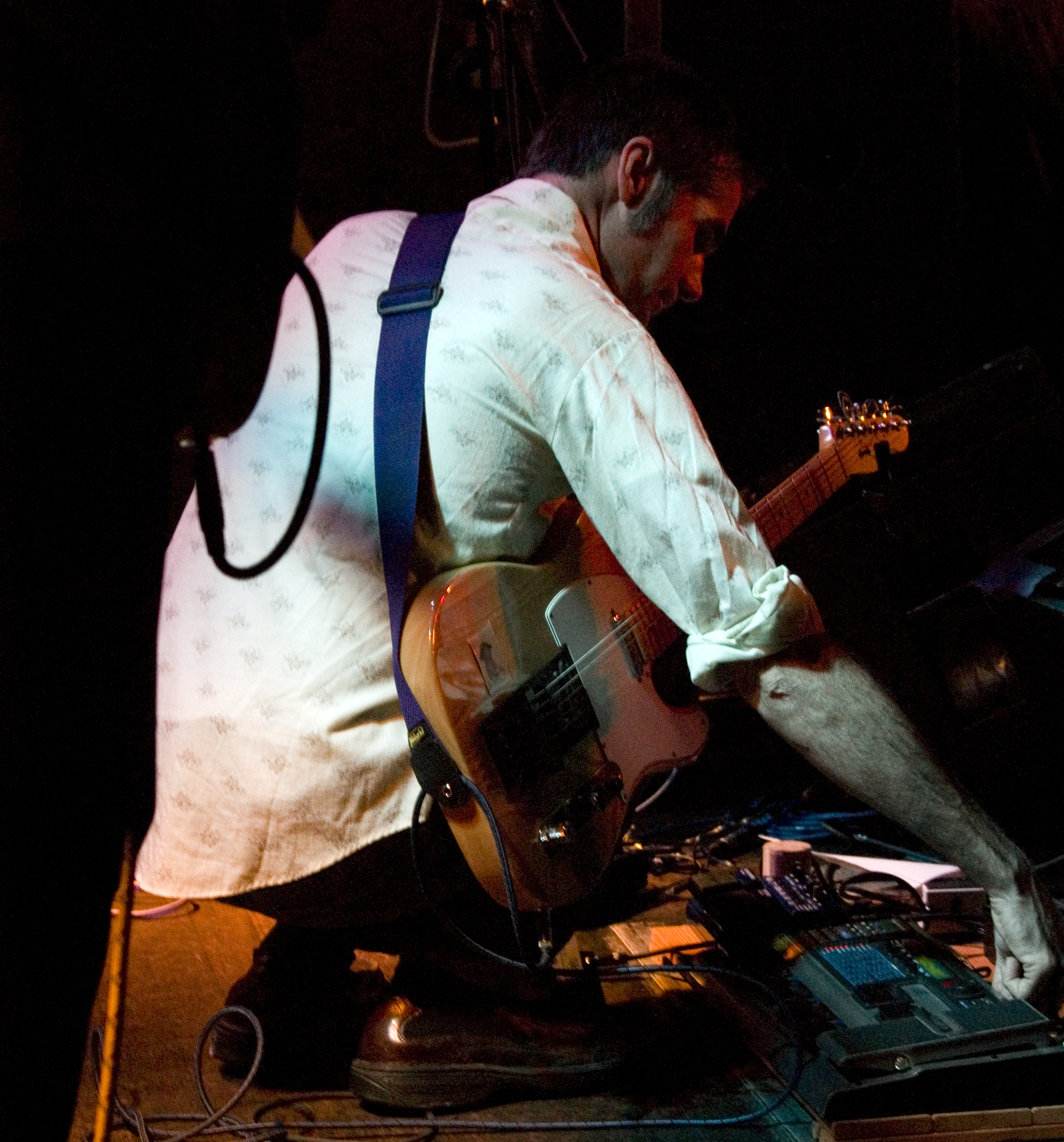
Jim White at Nottingham's Bodega Social Club, 2007

White's live shows, particularly when touring solo, can be characterized as off-beat, blending his playlist with open discussion with the audience, anecdotal storytelling derived from his own life experiences, all of which is typically humorous and insightful, with a deep sense of his feeling for the broken beauty of humanity.

White's albums often feature unlikely collaborations. On Wrong-Eyed Jesus, folk singer Victoria Williams sings on the track "Angel-Land"; British electronica trio Morcheeba produced and played on three tracks on No Such Place alongside Sade keyboardist Andrew Hale, who produced three tracks on the same album. Aimee Mann, Barenaked Ladies, and jazz guitarist Bill Frisell appear on Drill a Hole in That Substrate and Tell Me What You See, which was produced by Joe Henry, Tucker Martine, and Jim White himself. In an interview with David Byrne, White described the making of the album.

White's 2012 album Where It Hits You marked his first effort after an amicable parting of ways with Byrne's Luaka Bop. The record features guest appearances by members the roots group Olabelle, Terri Binion and Shak Nasty. Where It Hits You was released on the Yep Roc label.

In 2017 White's album Waffles, Triangles & Jesus came out via the PIAPTK label in the US and Loose in the UK. White was joined by musical group Hog Eyed Man, Holly Golightly, and Cicada Rhythm.

White's 2020 album Misfit's Jubilee marked a departure from his more solemn introspective previous work, featuring and upbeat collaboration with Belgian recording artists Geert Hellings and Nicolas Rombouts. White's longtime drummer Marlon Patton played drums on Misfit's Jubilee, as he did on White's previous four solo records.

White's debut album Wrong Eyed Jesus is considered a minor classic in the Americana genre, and his fan base includes various entertainment luminaries such as David Byrne, Matt Groening, and Vince Gilligan. The song "Wordmule" appeared in the Breaking Bad episode "Blood Money", while "Static on the Radio" appeared in the end credits of El Camino: A Breaking Bad Movie.

In 2025, White released 'Precious Bane', a collaboration with Trey Blake, a neurodivergent artist who resides in Brighton, UK. Stereolab keyboard player Joe Watson co-engineered the album.

== Side projects ==
In 2003 White appeared as de facto tour guide in the documentary film Searching for the Wrong Eyed Jesus, exploring oral and song traditions of the poor white US south. White appeared alongside writer Harry Crews and musicians Johnny Dowd, The Handsome Family and David Eugene Edwards. Before achieving cult status, the film was featured in festivals around the world, winning Best Documentary at the Seattle Film Festival.

In 2006, Jim White collaborated with Johnny Dowd and Willie B and formed a group called Hellwood; in 2006, the band toured throughout Europe to promote the album Chainsaw of Life. White served as producer and songwriter on a collaboration alongside Tucker Martine and blues singer Linda Delgado on a project titled Mama Lucky. Mama Lucky's first release Permanent Stranger was released in a limited fashion in February 2009.

In 2010 White created Sounds of the Americans, an experimental collaboration with guitarist Dan Nettles based on the soundtrack they composed for a Juilliard Music School theater production.

Continuing his pattern of alternating between solo projects and collaborations, in 2014 White teamed up with the Packway Handle Band to release the bluegrass hybrid Take It Like A Man, which peaked at #3 on the Billboard bluegrass chart.

In 2023, White released Permanent Stranger under the band name "Mama Lucky," his side project with Portland-based producer Tucker Martine. He also co-produced Ane Diaz's "Despechada" album and produced Ben De La Cour's critically acclaimed record Sweet Anhedonia (Jullian Records), which appeared on several "Best of 2023" lists.

=== Film ===
- 2003: Searching for the Wrong-Eyed Jesus
- 2016: Land by Babak Jalali (actor)
- 2022: Ragged Heart by Evan McNary (actor)

=== Visual art exhibits ===
- "Deep Fried Ephemera", The Douglas Hyde Gallery, Dublin, Ireland July 4 – August 18, 2009
- "Winter at SECCA" Southeastern Center for Contemporary Art, Winston-Salem, NC
- "Crossroads" series, performing with The South Memphis String Band, February 19, 2011
- "Scrapbook of a Fringe Dweller" Ogden Museum of Southern Art, New Orleans LA, Oct.7 – December 15, 2013
- Artist in residence 2015-2018, Aarhus, Denmark Festuge

=== Books ===
"Superwhite! / Wild-Eyed Tree", The Douglas Hyde Gallery, 2009. In conjunction with art exhibit. "Includes autobiographical text, Superwhite (Another True Story), and previously unreleased lyrics by Jim White. Also included are images of the exhibition and photographs by Jim White."

In 2013 White's story "The Bottom" was published in the literary journal Radio Silence, and in 2014, it was awarded the prestigious Pushcart Prize for Short Fiction.

After publishing work in various periodicals over his 20-year musical career, White's debut novel Incidental Contact was released in 2022.

"Blessings and Curses: Another True Story" - Illustrated pamphlet with story. 2001, Luaka Bop

In 2025, White published "Skirmishes with the Lord" – a collection of essays chronicling the making of the award-winning BBC 4 documentary, 'Searching for the Wrong Eyed Jesus.'

=== Theater ===
- Musical Score to "The Americans", a Sam Shepard play (with Dan Nettles), Juilliard School of Music NYC, February 11, 2010

== Personal life ==
White is the father of recording artist Willow Avalon.

== Discography ==
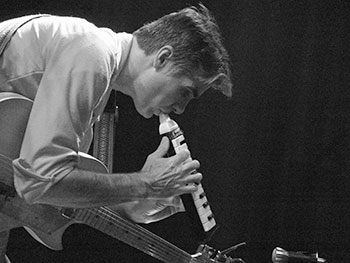
Jim White performing in Denmark 2014

=== Albums ===
- 1997: Wrong-Eyed Jesus (The Mysterious Tale of How I Shouted)
- 2001: No Such Place
- 2004: Drill a Hole in That Substrate and Tell Me What You See
- 2005: Jim White Presents: Music from Searching for the Wrong-Eyed Jesus
- 2007: Transnormal Skiperoo
- 2012: Where It Hits You
- 2017: Waffles, Triangles & Jesus
- 2020: Misfit's Jubilee
- 2023: Mama Lucky: Permanent Stranger

=== EPs ===
- 1997: Gimme 5
- 2008: A Funny Little Cross to Bear

=== Collaborations ===
- 2004: Tanakh (Jesse Poe) "Villa Claustrophobia"
- 2006: Tanakh "Ardent Fevers"
- 2006: Hellwood (Jim White, Johnny Dowd, Willie B) Chainsaw of Life
- 2009: Mama Lucky (Jim White, Tucker Martine, Linda Delgado) Permanent Stranger Limited Release
- 2010: Sounds of the Americans (Jim White, Dan Nettles)
- 2011: Dare Dukes, Thugs and China Dolls (produced the song "Simon Says")
- 2011: Producer, Belgian Alt Country band (Stanton)
- 2011; Sounds of the Americans (score for Juilliard Music School theatrical performance of Sam Shepherd works)
- 2012: Producer, Skipperdees (Some Bright Mourning)
- 2012: Producer Alex Wright (Starlight Navigator)
- 2014: Jim White v.s The Packway Handle Band (Jim White, Packway Handle Band) The Sawyer Sessions EP
- 2015: Jim White v.s The Packway Handle Band (Jim White, Packway Handle Band) Take It Like A Man
- 2015: Sigmatropic ' Every Soul Is A Boat ' 12' ep [Record Store Day] (vocals & lyrics on ' That Throne in Your Heart ')
- 2018 Producer Thomas Kozak (The Rubicon)
- 2022: Producer Ben De La Cour (Sweet Anhedonia)
- 2022: Producer Ane Diaz (Despechada)
- 2023: Mama Lucky (Jim White, Tucker Martine, Linda Delgado) Permanent Stranger Worldwide Release
- 2025: Precious Bane (Jim White, Trey Blake)
