= Cemetery Shoes =

Studio album by Johnny Dowd
- Released: 2004
- Length: 36:51

Johnny Dowd chronology
Wire Flowers: More Songs from the Wrong Side of Memphis (2003)	Cemetery Shoes (2004)	Cruel Words (2006)

Professional ratings
Review scores
Source	Rating
Allmusic	3.5/5 stars

Cemetery Shoes is an album by Johnny Dowd, released in 2004.

== Track listing ==
1. "Brother Jim" – 3:33
2. "Garden of Delight" – 3:02
3. "Whisper in a Nag's Ear" – 3:03
4. "Rest in Peace" – 3:50
5. "Wedding Dress" – 4:52
6. "Shipwreck" – 3:24
7. "Dear John Letter" – 2:23
8. "Easter Sunday" – 2:49
9. "Christmas Is Just Another Day" – 3:29
10. "Dylan's Coat" – 3:32
11. "Rip Off" – 2:54
