= Drill a Hole in That Substrate and Tell Me What You See =

Studio album by Jim White
- Released: May 4, 2004
- Length: 62:39
- Label: Luaka Bop

Jim White chronology
No Such Place (2001)	Drill a Hole in That Substrate and Tell Me What You See (2004)	Jim White Presents: Music from Searching for the Wrong-Eyed Jesus (2005)

Professional ratings
Review scores
Source	Rating
AllMusic	4/5 stars
Pitchfork Media	(8.1/10)
Rolling Stone	3/5 stars

Drill a Hole in That Substrate and Tell Me What You See is an album by Jim White, released in 2004. The co-vocals on "Static on the Radio" are by Aimee Mann.

The opening track of the album, "Static on the Radio," was used on the ending credits for El Camino: A Breaking Bad Movie.

The album was reissued as a Deluxe Edition for its 20th anniversary, on April 4, 2024, including 2LP, CD, and digital formats. The reissue contained three additional tracks that had not previously been released on the original standard album.

== Track listing ==
1. "Static on the Radio" – 6:31
2. "Bluebird" – 5:29
3. "Combing My Hair in a Brand New Style" – 6:24
4. "That Girl from Brownsville Texas" – 6:22
5. "Borrowed Wings" – 4:34
6. "If Jesus Drove a Motor Home" – 4:36
7. "Objects in Motion" – 5:58
8. "Buzzards of Love" – 7:00
9. "Alabama Chrome" – 4:25
10. "Phone Booth in Heaven" – 7:09
11. "Land Called Home" – 4:11

== 20th Anniversary Deluxe Edition Bonus Tracks ==
1. "Suckerz Promisez" – 5:55
2. "Stranger Candy" – 5:10
3. "Cinderblock Walls" – 5:23

Bonus tracks 1 and 3 previously appeared on the original Japanese release of the standard album and on the iTunes Deluxe Version.

== Personnel ==
- Jim White - vocals, guitar, banjo, harmonica, melodica, trombone, piano, organ, keyboards, percussion
- David Palmer - keyboards, synthesizer, sampler
- Jay Bellerose - drums, bongos
- Ralph Carney - flute, saxophone, trumpet
- Steven Page - rap vocals, background vocals
- Jim Creeggan - percussion
- Steve Moore - trombone, Wurlitzer piano, harmonium, Wurlitzer organ
- Tyler Stewart - drums, percussion
- Ed Robertson - rap vocals, guitar
- Kevin Hearn - guitar, accordion, keyboards, synthesizer
- Danny Frankel - bongos, percussion
- Travis Good - guitar
- Eyvind Kang - viola, organ
- Mike Belitsky - drums
- Jeremiah Sullivan - mandolin
- Ryan Freeland - Clavinet
- Chris Henrich - pedal steel guitar
- David Piltch - double bass, electric bass, bass guitar
- Dorothy Robinett - bass clarinet
- Jon Hyde - pedal steel guitar, bass guitar
- Mark Saunders - sampler
- Paul Fonfara - viola, clarinet, saxophone
- Paul Rabjohns - acoustic guitar, mandolin, accordion, marimbula, bass guitar, snare drum, ron roco
- Tucker Martine - drums, percussion

Also

- M. Ward
- Donna De Lory
- Niki Haris
- Chris Bruce
- Guthrie Trapp
- Dallas Good
- Linda Delgado
- Ladies Of Loretta Lynching
- Peter Gardiner
- Suzie Ungerleider
- Bill Frisell
- Aimee Mann
- Barenaked Ladies
- Mary Gauthier
- Joe Henry
- Marc Anthony Thompson
- Terri Binion
- Oh Susanna
