= Ruaidhrí Ó Dubhda =

Ruaidhrí Ó Dubhda (fl. 1380) was King of Ui Fiachrach Muaidhe.

Ruaidhrí succeeded his father, Donell, in 1380.

The contemporary Annals of Ulster state, sub anno 1417, Ruaidhri, son of Domnaill Ua Dubhda, namely, king of Ui-Fiachrach, died in his own stronghold after victory of penance.

Preceded by Donell Ó Dubhda	Kings of Ui Fiachrach Muaidhe; 1380–1417	Succeeded by Tadhg Riabhach Ó Dubhda
