= Taichlech mac Maelruanaid Ó Dubhda =

Irish king, died 1282

Kings of Uí Fiachrach Muaidhe
- Reign: 1281?–1282
- Predecessor: Brian Dearg Ó Dubhda
- Successor: Conchobair Ó Dubhda
- Died: 1282

Taichlech mac Maelruanaid Ó Dubhda (died 1282) was King of Uí Fiachrach Muaidhe.

== Annalistic references ==
- 1278. Brian O'Dowda and Art na g-Capall of the Horses O'Hara, Lord of Leyny, gave battle to the Clann-Feorais Birminghams, in which the Clann-Feorais were defeated, and the two sons of Meyler More, Conor Roe Mac Feorais, and others besides, were slain.
- 1281. A battle was fought between the Barretts and the Cusack, in which the Barretts were defeated, and William Barrett, Adam Fleming, and many others, were slain. There were assisting the Cusack in this battle two of the Irish, namely, Taichleach O'Boyle and Taichleach O'Dowda, who surpassed all that were there in bravery and valour, and in agility and dexterity at shooting.
- 1282. Taichleach, son of Mulrony O'Dowda, Lord of Tireragh, the most hospitable and warlike of his tribe in his time, was slain by Adam Cusack on the strand of Traigh Eothaile.

Preceded by Brian Dearg Ó Dubhda	Kings of Uí Fiachrach Muaidhe; 1281?–1282	Succeeded by Conchobair Ó Dubhda
