= Dubh Essa =

- Pronunciation: approximately "Do-vess-a"
- Gender: Female

Origin
- Meaning: dark beauty of the waterfall

Other names
- Related names: Dub Essa, Dubh Easa, Dubheasa, Dubheasa, Dubhesa, Dubhessa, Duibheasa, Duibhessa, Duvessa,

Dubh Essa (also spelled Dub Essa, Dubhessa, Dubhesa, Dubheasa, Dubh Easa, Duibhessa, Duibheasa) was a medieval Gaelic feminine given name, fairly common in 13th- and 14th-century Ireland.

While the name may be a compound of Gaelic dubh "dark" (probably referring to hair color, hence "black-haired") and eas "waterfall, cascade, rapid" (genitive easa), its meaning is sometimes interpreted as "black nurse" (Latin: nutrix nigra).

Dubh Essa has also been anglicized as Duvessa (e.g., in M. J. Molloy's 1964 comedy The Wooing of Duvessa).

== Bearers ==
- Dubh Essa ingen Briain, died 1052.
- Dubh Essa ingen Amhalgadha, died 1078.
- Dubh Essa ingen maic Aedha, died 1115.
- Dubh Essa Níc Eidhin, died 1187.
- Dubh Essa Bean Uí Dubhda, died 1190.
- Dubhessa Ní Diarmata, died 1229.
- Dubhessa Ní hElide, died 1328.
- Dubhessa Ní Fherghail, died 1328.
- Dubhessa Bean Uí Chonchobhair, died 1328.
