= Packway Handle Band =

American bluegrass quintet

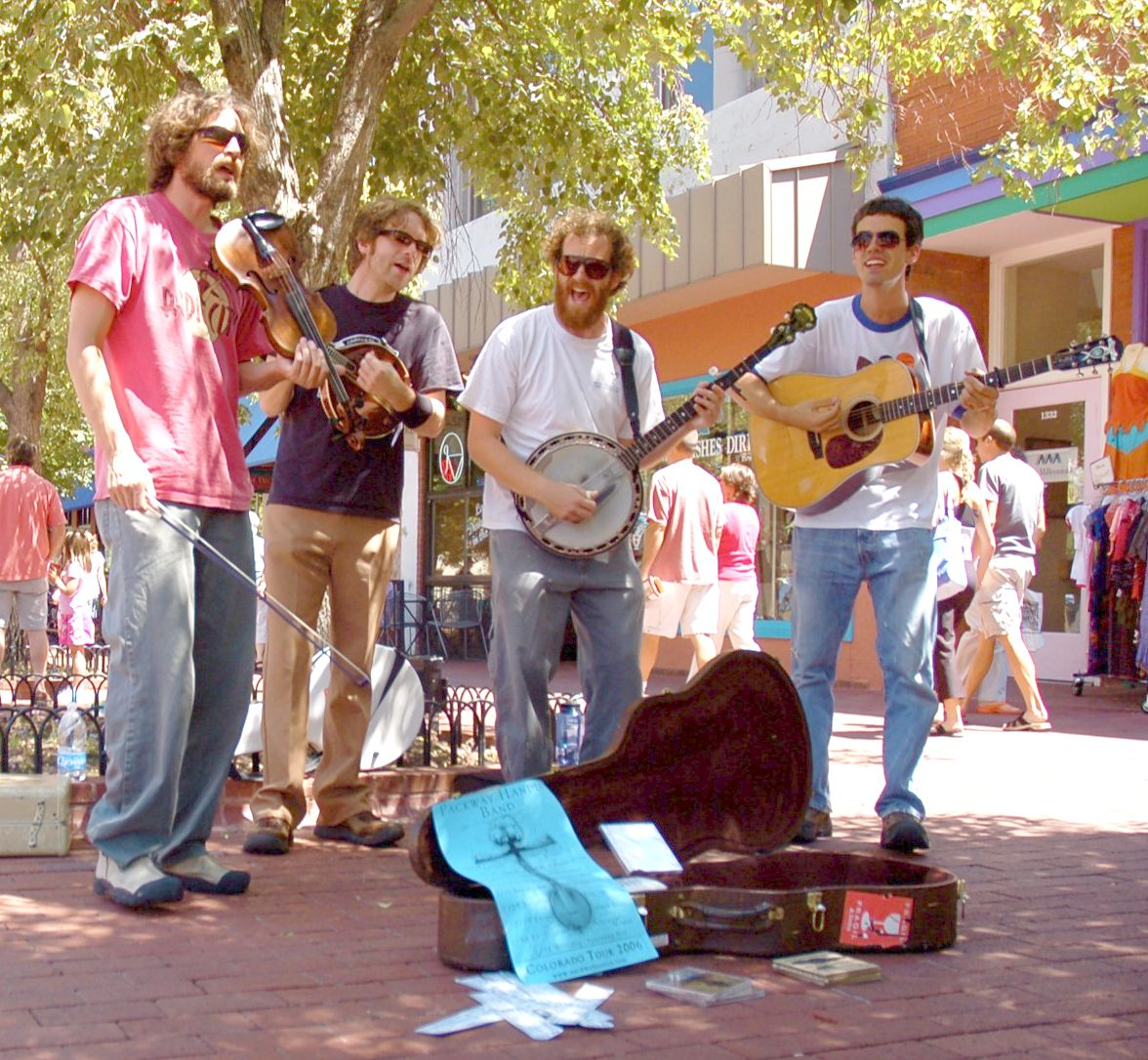
- Street performing in Boulder, Colorado; 2006

Background information
- Origin: Athens, Georgia, United States
- Genres: Bluegrass, Americana, Folk
- Years active: 2001–present
- Members: Josh Erwin, Tom Baker, Andrew Heaton, Michael Paynter, Zach McCoy
- Website: Official site

The Packway Handle Band is an American bluegrass quintet, originating as a part of Music of Athens, Georgia in 2001. The band is known for tight three- and four-part vocal harmonies, extensive and progressive original material, off-the-wall covers, and energetic performance dynamics around two tightly-spaced condenser mics. Fans of the band include bluegrass traditionalists and those who say they don't usually like bluegrass.

== History ==
=== Origins ===
Original members Josh Erwin, Tom Baker, and Michael Paynter grew up together and "started playing casually" around Athens in 2001. The fledgling group placed fourth in the 2002 Telluride Bluegrass Festival. In 2003, they won the Athens hosting of the Miller Lite "Locals Only" Battle of the Bands, besting 72 rock bands with an energetic, single-mic performance.

They were finalists three consecutive years in the prestigious Telluride Bluegrass Festival Band Competition and have been voted Athens' Best Bluegrass/Americana/Folk Band multiple times in the readers' choice Flagpole Magazine Music Awards.

=== 2000s ===
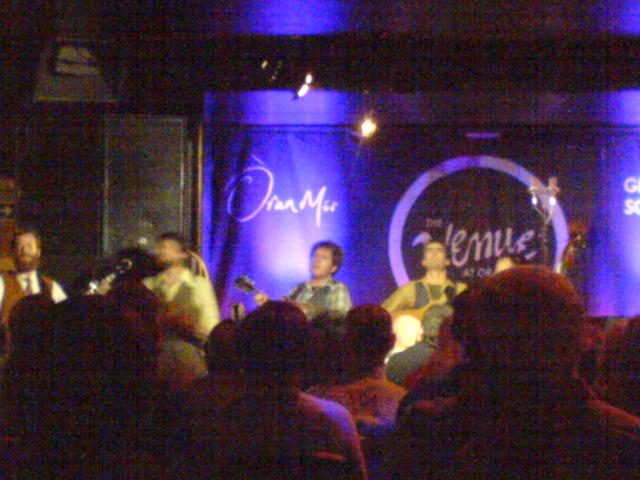
At 2008 Celtic Connections Festival in Glasgow, Scotland

In January 2004, PHB released their debut album Chaff Harvest, which features some of the band's creative, early songwriting. According to the SouthEastern Bluegrass Association, "this is not a recording for those who would like bluegrass to remain frozen in 1953 . . 'Chaff Harvest' is a welcome breath of fresh air from an innovative band that shows even more promise for the future." In September 2005 PHB released (Sinner) You Better Get Ready - a collection of traditional gospel tunes, some haunting tunes about the end of the world, and an arrangement of Madonna's "Like a Prayer." Sinner was voted one of the Top Ten Albums to come out of Athens in 2005 by the readers of Flagpole Magazine.

In 2008, they released a self-titled album and What Are We Gonna Do Now?

=== 2010s ===
In 2015, the band teamed-up with Athens-based, singer-songwriter Jim White to release the collaborative record Take It Like a Man via Yep Roc Records. PHB released their latest album Go On Get Up in 2017. It was produced by Scott McCaughey and features appearances by Bill Berry, Brad Morgan, Matt "Pistol" Stoessel, Thayer Serrano, and Shonna Tucker.

=== Touring ===
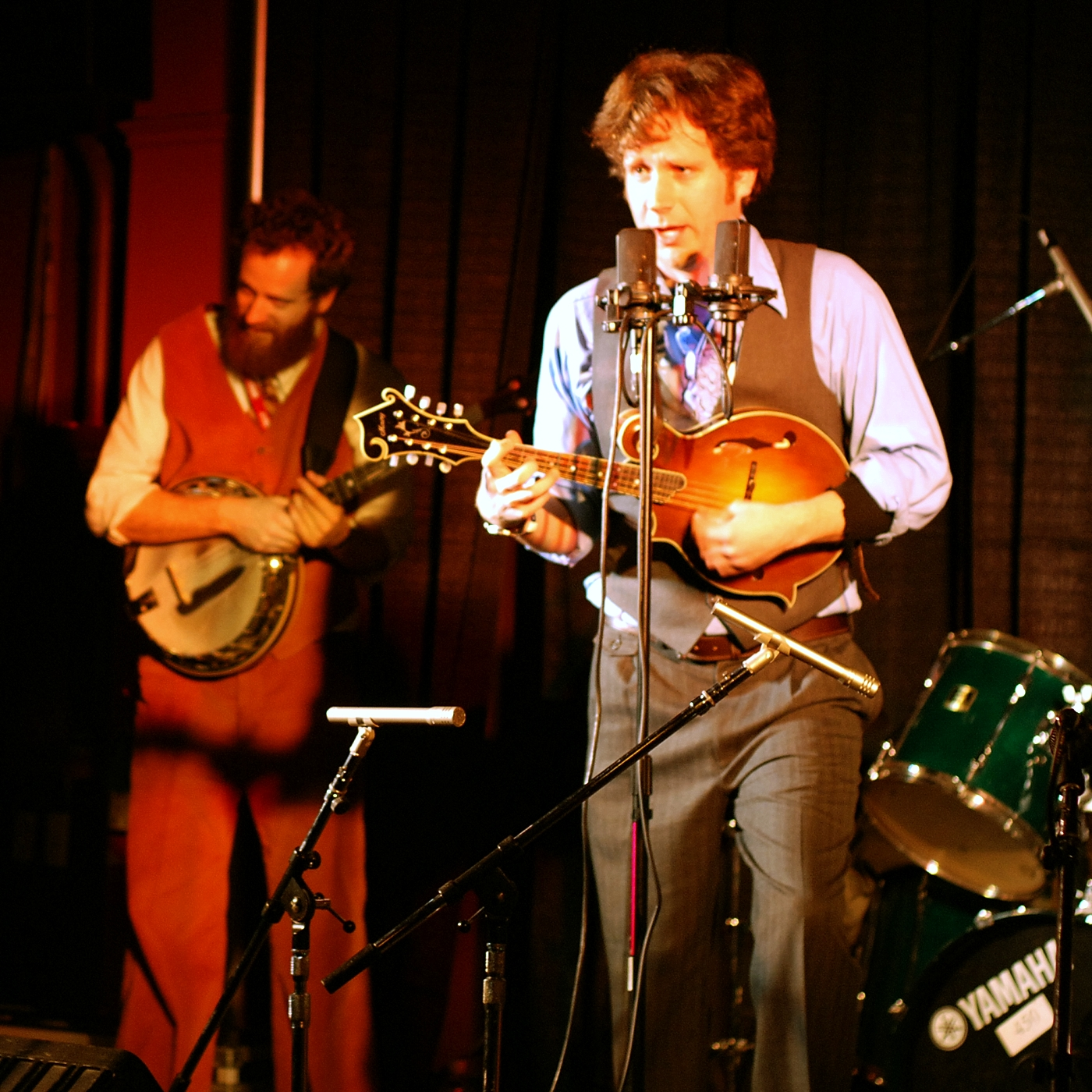
Michael Paynter (mandolin) Tom Baker (banjo) 2008 Wintergrass Tacoma, Washington

The Packway Handle Band has toured widely and shared the stage with many great musicians including Ralph Stanley, The Avett Brothers, Shovels & Rope, Yonder Mountain String Band, Greensky Bluegrass, Railroad Earth, Infamous Stringdusters, Donna The Buffalo, Darrell Scott, Larry Keel, Jeff Austin, and Confederate Railroad. PHB supported Kid Rock and Foreigner on the 2015 Cheap Date Tour, a national 40 show amphitheater tour that included a record breaking 10 consecutive sold out shows at the DTE Energy Music Theater in Detroit.

== Style ==
It's a roots music played at all speeds. We revolve the sound around the acoustic instruments, but we add touches here and there of other instrumentation.

— Josh Erwin

Inspirations for the group's musical style include Hot Rize and Devo. Erwin says, "We played a whole Devo tribute show for Halloween, and it was really cool learning all those songs. I think it influenced the mechanics of us arranging and performing together."

== Current members ==
- Josh Erwin - Guitar and Vocals
- Tom Baker - Banjo and Vocals
- Andrew Heaton - Fiddle and Vocals
- Michael Paynter - Mandolin and Vocals
- Troy Harris - Bass
