= Maelruanaidh Ó Dubhda =

Maelruanaidh Ó Dubhda (died 1221) was King of Uí Fiachrach Muaidhe.

== Annalistic references ==
Preceded by Donnchadh Ó Dubhda	Kings of Uí Fiachrach Muaidhe ?–1221	Succeeded by Brian Dearg Ó Dubhda
