= Éamonn mac An Cosnamhach Ó Dubhda =

Éamonn mac An Cosnamhach Ó Dubhda was an Irish Chief of the Name and Lord of Tireragh who died c. 1471.

Almost the only document dealing with the succession of the Ó Dubhda Chief of the Name is Araile do fhlathaibh Ua nDubhda, which presents many chronological difficulties. Even when dates and/or lengths of reigns are given, they can only be approximated as some chiefs may have ruled in opposition to each other.

Araile describes Éamonn as reigning for "five weeks and half a year".

Preceded by Seaán Glas mac Tadhg Riabhach Ó Dubhda	Ó Dubhda ?	Succeeded by Domhnall Ballach Ó Dubhda
