= Taichleach Ua Dubhda =

Irish king, died 1192

Taichleach Ua Dubhda (died 1192) was King of Uí Fiachrach Muaidhe.

== Annalistic references ==
- 1182. Murrough, the son of Taichleach O'Dowda, was killed by Melaghlin O'Mulrony.
- 1192. Taichleach O'Dowda, Lord of Hy-Awley and Hy-Fiachrach of the Moy, was slain by his own two grandsons.

Preceded by An Cosnmhaidh Ua Dubhda	Kings of Ui Fiachrach Muaidhe; 1162?–1192	Succeeded by Donnchadh Ó Dubhda
