= Brian Dearg Ó Dubhda =

Irish regional king (13th century)

Brian Dearg Ó Dubhda (1221?–1242) was the King of Ui Fiachrach Muaidhe.

Preceded by Maelruanaidh Ó Dubhda	Kings of Ui Fiachrach Muaidhe; 1221?–1242	Succeeded by Taichlech mac Maelruanaid Ó Dubhda
