= Mac Domhnaill Ua Dubhda =

Mac Domhnaill Fhinn Ua Dubhda (died 1136) was King of Ui Fiachrach Muaidhe.

== Annalistic reference ==
- 1136. The son of Domhnall Ua Dubhda, lord of Ui-Amhalghadha, was killed.

Preceded by Amhlaibh mac Domhnaill Fhinn Ua Dubhda	Kings of Ui Fiachrach Muaidhe; 1135?–1136	Succeeded by Aodh mac Muirchertach Ua Dubhda
