= Dubda mac Connmhach =

Dubda mac Connmhach, Eponym and Ancestor of the Clan Ó Dubhda of north Connacht, fl. 9th–10th century.

== Family background ==
Dubda mac Connmhach was a grandson of King Donn Cothaid mac Cathail of Ui Fiachrach Muaidhe (died 772) and eponymous ancestor of Clan Conway (Connmhach). He and his brother, Caomhán mac Connmhach, were sons of Connchmach mac Donn Cathaid.

Dubhda traced his descent back to Nath Í mac Fiachrach (aka Dathí), son of Fiachrae, the older half-brother of the semi-legendary Niall Noígíallach (died c. 450?), via sonFiachnae. This made Dubhda a member of the Uí Fiachrach dynasty who produced a number of Kings of Connacht.

== King and Lord ==
According to Dubhaltach Mac Fhirbhisigh (263.8), Dubhda was the younger brother but came to an arrangement with Caomhán in which Dubhda would become king, while "Caomhán's representative should have a choice of territory as his patrimony and (the right to be at) the shoulder of the king of Ui Fhiachrach always" and other rights besides.

His grandson, Aed Ua Dubhda (died 983) would become King of Ui Fiachrach Muaidhe.

== Family tree ==
    Donn Cothaid (died 772)
    |
    |
    Connmhach
    |
    |___________________
    |                  |
    |                  |
    Caomhán            Dubda

Preceded by Connchmach mac Donn Cathaid?	Kings of Ui Fiachrach Muaidhe ?–?	Succeeded by Aed mac Mael Padraig
