= Coolaney/Mullinabreena GAA =

Sligo-based Gaelic games club

Coolaney/Mullinabreena
- Cúil Áine/Mulach na Bréine
- Founded: 1889
- County: Sligo
- Colours: Blue and White
- Grounds: Nace O'Dowd Park, Achonry

Playing kits
Standard colours

Senior Club Championships
	All Ireland	Connacht champions	Sligo champions
Football:	-	-	1

Coolaney/Mullinabreena is a Gaelic Athletic Association club based in the parishes of Killoran/Coolaney and Achonry/Mullinabreena in County Sligo, Ireland.

The club has links to Nace O'Dowd and its home ground, which opened in 1994, is named after him.

== Honours ==
- Sligo Senior Football Championship: (1)
  - 1958
- Sligo Intermediate Football Championship: (2)
  - 2005, 2011,2025
- Sligo Junior Football Championship: (5)
  - 1910, 1957, 1968, 1984, 1988
- Sligo Under 20 Football Championship: (2)
  - 1992, 1993 (as St Nathy's, amalgamated with Bunninadden)
- Sligo Minor Football Championship: (2)
  - 1957, 2010
- Sligo Junior Football League (Division 5): (1)
  - 1984
- Benson Cup: (1)
  - 1991
