= Aodh mac Muirchertach Ua Dubhda =

Aodh mac Muirchertach Ua Dubhda was a King of Ui Fiachrach Muaidhe. He ruled in what is present day Ireland, and he perished in 1143 CE.

== Annalistic reference ==
- 1143. Aedh, son of Muircheartach Ua Dubhda, lord of Ui-Fiachrach of the North, and of Ui-Amhalghada, died.

Preceded by Mac Domhnaill Fhinn Ua Dubhda	Kings of Ui Fiachrach Muaidhe; 1136?–1143	Succeeded by Ruaidhrí Mear Ua Dubhda
