= Misfit's Jubilee =

Studio album by Jim White
- Released: October 30, 2020
- Studio: Studio Caporal
- Genre: Alternative country
- Length: 45:19
- Labels: Fluff & Gravy (US), Loose Music (Europe and the UK)

Jim White chronology
Waffles, Triangles and Jesus (2019)	Misfit's Jubilee (2020)

Professional ratings
Review scores
Source	Rating
Metro	(October 30, 2020, p.22)
Mojo	link
Peterborough Telegraph	(October 20, 2020, p.49)
Spectrum Culture	link
Uncut	link

Misfit's Jubilee is an album by Jim White released in 2020. U.S. record label Fluff & Gravy hyped the release stating that "The ever-elusive Americana maverick Jim White returns with his most upbeat, hallucinogenic record to date" while European and U.K. label Loose Music touted that the album was "Quickly being recognised as his most intriguing and unruly album to date ... a scrapbook of ideas, images, colours and sounds gathered over White's illustrious career, bound together to form his latest studio album." Notably, Indie Music reviewers tended to agree with the assessments of White's record labels and the album received overall favorable reviews, with comparisons to Bruce Springsteen, Bob Dylan, Elvis Costello, Chicks, Neil Young, the Go-Go's, and the Violent Femmes.

Critic David Schuster summarized that White " . . . is someone with something interesting to say, based on a wealth of gritty experience, and it's going to be said with a sprinkling of humour. That in a nutshell is Misfit's Jubilee, his eighth studio album," comparing the album to a " . . . road trip across one of the southern states . . . " and proclaiming the album "pure Americana, rooted in the same influences as Dylan's Highway 61 Revisited and Johnny Cash's last, great album in his lifetime, When the Man Comes Around." The same critic stated that " . . . White has evolved country-folk into something far quirkier and given it an edge." White, himself, referred to the album as "sonic Kool aid." A review in British newspaper, METRO, called White's effort "baroque cowpunk" with a "faux-naiveté" highlighting that "His favorite subject remains, as ever, the joys and the alarms found in the cracks of human imperfection." The review notes that "Each song is a study in how a wayward or broken life - and of this he presumably has wide experience - can deliver wisdom or beauty in its own curious way," with stories from White's own adventures. One gets the feeling that it doesn't matter whether the stories in the songs are real or fabricated for purposes of entertainment or something grander, like figuring out the meaning of life.

Another critique by Justin Cober-Lake noted that "White likes to keep his listeners off balance, and he comfortably does so through odd characters, surprising lyrical moments, or sonic oddities" in the perfect contemporary setting where "As society collapses, even the misfits can't truly celebrate, but they can see a little extra from their outsider status." The critic summarizes that White doesn't tell the listener what to conclude about the journey of life but that he paints a picture to think on and draw conclusions. The Journal of Roots Music offered a similar review, calling White's work "A cross between a hysterical lunatic and a road-weary sage, Jim White really lets loose on the electrifying Misfit's Jubilee, the latest installment in his ongoing quest to make sense of reality in all its dazzling weirdness" and labeling the album as "soul searching" "southern gothic" in which " . . . Jim White has created the perfect soundtrack for this absurd modern world."

== Promotion ==
Beyond the psyche of White, the album is reflective of the political atmosphere of the U.S. in general in 2020. A promotional video for the song "The Divided States Of America" was released October 21, 2020 on Jim White's YouTube channel. White stated in the comments of the video that "What you got here is your basic semi-psychotic music video featuring the final song on this next record of mine, called Misfit's Jubilee. At this moment in our collective history it makes sense that voices normally content to remain silent should be lifted in outrage, howling, exhorting our minds and hearts to focus on a singular goal---higher ground for all, not just the rich folks." The album ends with the song, and White noted in the video post that "My sincere prayer is that my fellow Americans will wake up and once more hunger for a kinder, saner compass, one that'll lead us back to the pursuit of nobler intentions, ideals of freedom and fairness that were once our theoretical guideposts as a people."

In addition to the promotional video for "The Divided States Of America" the album and its songs were promoted by the record labels and White on social media, Facebook in particular. Loose Music posted a month before the album was released that "Jim White is back with "Smart Ass Reply", the second single taken from his brilliant upcoming album "Misfit's Jubilee", out 30 October." Although some may view the album artwork for the digital single as a childish abstraction, one reviewer characterized the song as being " . . . intellectual without being pretentious, street-level without pandering, and a powerful reminder of his particular genius." The critic went on to blame "Jesus and Alice Cooper" for the song popping out and reviving a rebellious spirit in him[White] from years earlier, when he was a Southern religious Jesus Freak that secretly listened to Alice Cooper.

Earlier promotion included the first advance single for the album, "Sum Of What We Have Been," which was released in the publication Americana Highway, and announced via a social media post from White. The article on the premiere of "Sum of What We Have Been" notes that "Jim White fans will be happily amazed at the joyfulness in this song" and quoted White stating that "I'm known for my sorrowful story songs so I'm stumped about how this one came to be."

== Background, Funding, and Release ==
One review of the album states that while " . . . his latest album creates a stir by assembling a series of tracks that the major labels rejected in their desire to make him accessible," "White is willfully expressing his own views, unafraid of the consequences." "Many songs were written at different times over the years but never fit with the other material on the records White released back then. White recorded these tracks at Studio Caporal in Antwerp, Belgium, with drummer Marlon Patton, Geert Hellings on banjo and guitar, and Nicolas Rombouts on bass and keyboards." Although the record is a mix of songs written throughout the expanse of his career, they were all recorded for this album as a cohesive collection and " . . . White's constructions seem purposely antiquated to show the shallowness of contemporary life."

In addition to spending years crafting the album's lyrics and music, White also worked diligently to make the album a reality, financially. Album liner notes indicate partial funding for the album was provided by "Flemish Government State of the Arts" while White also launched what was titled "Another Weird Jim White Crowdfunding Offer" on Indiegogo to help him fund the album. White used the campaign to sell an assortment of memorabilia in exchange for donations to fund the project. The album was released digitally (on various platforms) and sold in physical formats through Bandcamp on CD, black vinyl LP record, and a limited edition "psychedelic" blue/yellow marbled vinyl LP (only 100 copies pressed). White created much of the promotional artwork for the album cover, promotional singles, and a Misfit's themed t-shirt offered on his website.

== Track listing ==
All tracks by Jim White

Engineered by Nicolas Rombouts, Marlon Patton, and Jim White

Mixed and mastered by John Keane

1. "Monkey In A Silo" – 4:26
2. "Wonders Never Cease" – 4:35
3. "The Sum OF What We've Been" – 3:58
4. "Where Would I Be" – 3:41
5. "Smart Ass Reply" – 4:00
6. "The Mystery Of You" – 4:24
7. "Highway Of Lost Hats" – 5:27
8. "Fighting My Ghosts Again" – 4:05
9. "My Life's A Stolen Picture" – 4:31
10. "The Divided States OF America" – 6:12

== Musicians ==
- Marlon Patton – drums
- Nicolas Rombouts – bass, double bass, synths, piano, vocals
- Jim White – acoustic guitar, slide guitar, electric guitar, banjolin, mandolin, oud, cumbus, dam, tambourine, keys, melodica, esoteric percussion, vocals, backing vocals
- Geert Hellings – acoustic guitar, slide guitar, electric guitar, banjo, vocals
- Josh Klein – trumpet
- Glenn Patscha – Piano
- Laura Huysmans – vocals
- Matt Watts – vocals
- Alex Wright – vocals
- Tara Anderson – vocals
- Sadie Pratt – vocals
- Willow Martin – vocals
- Andrew Wessen – vocals
