= Searching for the Wrong-Eyed Jesus =

Searching For the Wrong-Eyed Jesus
- Cover
- Directed by: Andrew Douglas
- Written by: Steve Haisman
- Starring: Jim White; Harry Crews; Johnny Dowd; David Eugene Edwards; Brett Sparks; Rennie Sparks; Gary Howington; David Johansen; Lee Sexton; Melissa Swingle
- Music by: Jim White
- Release date: 2003
- Running time: 82 minutes
- Countries: United States; United Kingdom
- Language: English

Searching for the Wrong-Eyed Jesus is a 2003 documentary film about the American South starring Jim White. Commissioned by the BBC, it documents the intersection of country music and Christianity in the United States. It was inspired by White's similarly titled album The Mysterious Tale of How I Shouted Wrong-Eyed Jesus.

The film was directed and photographed by Andrew Douglas, written by Steve Haisman, and edited by Michael Elliot. It was executive-produced by Steve Golin and Anthony Wall, and features the music of Jim White, Johnny Dowd, The Handsome Family, David Eugene Edwards of 16 Horsepower, Rev. Gary Howlington, The Singing Hall Sisters, David Johansen, Melissa Swingle and Lee Sexton. It also features the author Harry Crews.

== Music ==
=== Jim White Presents: Music from Searching For the Wrong-Eyed Jesus ===
Jim White Presents: Music from Searching For the Wrong-Eyed Jesus

Studio album by Jim White
- Released: 2005
- Genre: Alternative country
- Label: Luaka Bop

Jim White chronology
| Drill a Hole in That Substrate and Tell Me What You See (2004) | Jim White Presents: Music from Searching For the Wrong-Eyed Jesus (2005) | Transnormal Skiperoo (2007) |

In 2005, an official soundtrack to the film was released, containing the following songs.

Wrong Eyed Jesus Official Soundtrack

| No. | Title | Performer(s) | Length |
|---|---|---|---|
| 1. | "Everything Was Stories" | Harry Crews | 0:28 |
| 2. | "Still Waters" | Jim White | 6:36 |
| 3. | "My Sister's Tiny Hands" | The Handsome Family | 3:27 |
| 4. | "Crossbones Style" | Cat Power | 4:32 |
| 5. | "The Last Kind Words" | David Johansen & Larry Saltzman | 4:10 |
| 6. | "The Wound That Never Heals" | Jim White | 4:25 |
| 7. | "Wayfaring Stranger" | David Eugene Edwards (16 Horsepower) | 3:30 |
| 8. | "Small Town" | Mayor | 0:21 |
| 9. | "Black Soul Choir" | 16 Horsepower | 3:09 |
| 10. | "Little Maggie" | Lee Sexton | 2:28 |
| 11. | "First There Was" | Johnny Dowd with Maggie Brown | 5:02 |
| 12. | "Coo Coo Bird" | Clarence Ashley & Doc Watson | 2:32 |
| 13. | "Amazing Grace" | Melissa Swingle | 2:05 |
| 14. | "Christmas Day" | Jim White | 7:11 |
| 15. | "Essential Truth" | Jim White | 1:19 |

== See also ==
- Southern Gothic
- Americana Music
