= Tadhg Riabhach Ó Dubhda =

Irish regional king

=King of Uí Fiachrach Muaidhe
- Reign: 1417 – 1432
- Predecessor: Ruaidhrí Ó Dubhda
- Successor: Brian Ó Dubhda
- Died: 1432

Tadhg Riabhach Ó Dubhda (died 1432) was King of Uí Fiachrach Muaidhe.

Tadhg Riabhach is the last Ó Dubhda expressly listed as King of Uí Fiachrach Muaidhe in any contemporary or near-contemporary document. Araile do fhlathaibh Ua nDubhda says of him:

- Tadhg Riabhach Ua Dubhda mac Domnaill Clerigh, ri Ua fFiachrach, d'écc in Esgir Abhann iar fflaithius 15 bliadhan. Ingean Uí Maille mathair Ruaidrí remhráite agus an Taidcc-si ("Tadhg Riabhach Ó Dubhda s. Domhnall Cléireach, king of Uí Fhiachrach, died in Eiscir Abhann after a reign of 15 years. The daughter of Ó Máille was the mother of Ruaidhrí" (Ruaidhrí Ó Dubhda) "aforementioned and of this Tadhg.")

Preceded by Ruaidhrí Ó Dubhda	King of Uí Fiachrach Muaidhe; 1417–1432	Succeeded by Brian Ó Dubhda
