= Aedhuar Ua Dubhda =

Aedhuar Ua Dubhda (died 1059) was King of Ui Fiachrach Muaidhe.

== Annanlistic references ==
- 1059. Aedhvar Ua Dubhda, lord of Ui-Amhalghadha, was slain by his own tribe.

Preceded by Aed Ua Dubhda	Kings of Ui Fiachrach Muaidhe; 1005?–1059	Succeeded by Muirchertach An Cullach Ua Dubhda
