= Wrong-Eyed Jesus (The Mysterious Tale of How I Shouted) =

The Mysterious Tale of How I Shouted "Wrong-Eyed Jesus"

Studio album by Jim White
- Released: April 1997
- Recorded: May 1996
- Genre: Americana
- Length: 61:34
- Label: WEA
- Producer: Paul Rabjohns

Jim White chronology
The Mysterious Tale of How I Shouted "Wrong-Eyed Jesus" (1997)	No Such Place (2001)

Professional ratings
Review scores
Source	Rating
AllMusic	4/5 stars

The Mysterious Tale of How I Shouted "Wrong-Eyed Jesus" is an album by Jim White, released in 1997.

The album was the inspiration for the 2003 documentary film, Searching for the Wrong-Eyed Jesus.

== Track list ==
1. "Book of Angels" – 4:55
2. "Burn the River Dry" – 5:00
3. "Still Waters" – 6:36
4. "When Jesus Gets a Brand New Name " – 5:17
5. "Sleepy-Town" – 5:38
6. "A Perfect Day to Chase Tornados" – 6:07
7. "Wordmule" – 4:28
8. "Stabbed in the Heart" – 4:26
9. "Angel-Land" – 5:26
10. "Heaven of My Heart" – 4:35
11. "The Road That Leads to Heaven" – 9:05

== Personnel ==
- Julia Albert – vocals, background vocals
- Eddie Baytos – accordion
- Ralph Carney – clarinet, harmonica, musical saw, saxophone, slide clarinet, trombone
- Pam Corkey – background vocals
- Bill Elm – guitar, pedal steel
- Danny Frankel – drums, percussion
- Joe Henry – guitar, background vocals
- James Kreig – background vocals
- David Piltch – bass
- Paul Rabjohns – guitar, keyboards, percussion
- Martin Tillman – cello
- Victoria Williams – vocals
- Jim White – vocals, banjo, guitar, keyboards, percussion slide guitar

== In popular culture ==
- The song "Still Waters" was prominently featured in an episode of British surrealist comedy program Blue Jam.
- "Wordmule" was notably featured in "Blood Money", the 55th episode of Breaking Bad.
