= Donnchadh Ó Dubhda =

Donnchadh Ó Dubhda (fl. 1213) was King of Ui Fiachrach Muaidhe.

== Life ==
Donnchadh is almost wholly known from Araile do fhlathaibh Ua nDubhda, which says of him:

- Donnchadh Ó Dubhda [came] with a fleet of fifty-six ships from Innse Gall and came ashore in Inis Raithin among Inse Modh in Umhall, and he seized his own land free of tribute from Cathal Crobhdearg Ua Conchobair.

== Genealogy ==
Dubhaltach Mac Fhirbhisigh gives what appears to be his genealogy (265.2, pp. 598–99, volume I):

- Donnchadh Mór (mac Aodha m. Taithligh m. Aodha m. Muircheartaigh m. Aodha m. Taithligh m. Nell), trí mec les .i. Brían, Maolruanaidh, agus Muircheartach, ó ttaid Clann Chonchabhair/Donnchadh Mór (s. Aodh s. Taithleach s. Aodh s. Muircheartach s. Aodh s. Taithleach s. Niall) had three sons: Brian, Maol Ruanaidh, and Muircheartach, from whom are Clann Chonchabhair.

At 265.5 (pp. 600–601), Mac Fhirbhisigh gives the genealogy of another Donnchadh Mór, son of Taichleach O Dubhda, as having three sons; Donnchach Og, royal candidate of Ui Fhiachrach, Conchabhar, and Uilliam, bishop of Ceall Aladh (Kilalla), stating that the daughter of O Floinn was mother of those sons of Donnchadh Mor.

Preceded by Taichleach Ua Dubhda	Kings of Ui Fiachrach Muaidhe c.1213–?	Succeeded by Maelruanaidh Ó Dubhda
