= Mac Aodh Ua Dubhda =

King in medieval Ireland

Mac Aodh Ua Dubhda (died 1128) was King of Ui Fiachrach Muaidhe.

== Annalistic reference ==
- 1128. The battle of Ath-Fhirdhiadh was gained by the cavalry of Conchobhar, the son of Mac Lochlainn, over the cavalry of Tighearnan Ua Ruairc, where Ua Ciardha, lord of Cairbre; Cathal Ua Raghailligh; Sitriuc Ua Maelbrighde; the son of Aedh Ua Dubhda, lord of Ui-Amhalghadha; and many others along with them, were slain, in revenge of the violation Patrick's protection.

Preceded by Muirchertach An Cullach Ua Dubhda	Kings of Ui Fiachrach Muaidhe; 1125?–1128	Succeeded by Amhlaibh mac Domhnaill Fhinn Ua Dubhda,
