= Donell Ó Dubhda =

Donell Ó Dubhda (died 1380) was King of Ui Fiachrach Muaidhe.

== Annalistic references ==
- 1371. Great depredations were omitted by O'Dowda (Donnell) in Tir-Fhiachrach Muaidhe; the whole country was ravaged by him, and its castles were taken, namely, the castles of Ard-na-riagh and Castle-mic-Conor, and all the English that were in them were driven out; and the country was after this parcelled out amongst his kinsmen and his own people.
- 1373. Brian Oge, son of Brian O'Dowda, was slain by the Barretts.
- 1375. Cathal Oge, son of Cathal Oge, son of Cathal More, son of Donnell O'Conor, was slain by the Clann-Rickard. Loughlin, the son of Donough O'Dowda, was taken prisoner on this occasion.
- 1380. Donnell, the son of Brian O'Dowda, Lord of Tireragh and Tirawley, who defended his territory despite the English and Irish who were opposed to him, died in his own town on the third of May; and his son Rory assumed his place.

Preceded by Sén-Brian Ó Dubhda	Kings of Ui Fiachrach Muaidhe c.1371–1380	Succeeded by Ruaidhrí Ó Dubhda
