= An Cosnmhaidh Ua Dubhda =

King of Ui Fiachrach Muaidhe (died 1162)

An Cosnmhaidh Ua Dubhda (died 1162) was the king of Ui Fiachrach Muaidhe.

His wife, Dubh Essa Bean Uí Dubhda, died in 1190.

== Annalistic reference ==
- 1162. Cosnamhaigh Ua Dubhda, lord of Ui-Amhalghadha, was slain by his own tribe.

Preceded by Ruaidhrí Mear Ua Dubhda	Kings of Ui Fiachrach Muaidhe ?–1162	Succeeded by Taichleach Ua Dubhda
