= Transnormal Skiperoo =

Studio album by Jim White
- Released: 2007
- Genre: Alternative country
- Length: 55:31
- Label: Luaka Bop
- Producers: Joe Pernice, Michael Deming, Jim White, Tucker Martine

Jim White chronology
Jim White Presents: Music from Searching for the Wrong-Eyed Jesus (2005)	Transnormal Skiperoo (2007)	Where It Hits You (2012)

Professional ratings
Review scores
Source	Rating
Allmusic	link
Billboard	link
Entertainment Weekly	A− (14 Mar 2008, p.75)
Filter	86% (Winter 2008, p.98)
Los Angeles Times	link
The Onion (A.V. Club)	B+ link
PopMatters	link
Spin	link
Under the Radar	(Winter 2008, p.89)
Village Voice	link

Transnormal Skiperoo is a 2007 album by Jim White. It was produced by Joe Pernice and Michael Deming, recorded with the band Olabelle and also features tracks with Tucker Martine and Laura Veirs, local Georgia legend Don Chambers and Goat, bluegrass duo Jeff & Vida and percussionist Mauro Refosco.

In a 2007 interview White said the album title was a term he had invented to describe "a strange new feeling I've been experiencing after years of feeling lost and alone and cursed."

He explained: "Now, when everything around me begins to shine, when I find myself dancing around in my back yard for no particular reason other than it feels good to be alive, when I get this deep sense of gratitude that I don't need drugs or God or doomed romance to fuel myself through the gauntlet of a normal day, I call that feeling 'Transnormal Skiperoo'."

White said the album marked a change of mood, both personally and musically: "I could keep writing songs about being sad and miserable, that’s my stock in trade, but it’s not a true reflection of how I am now. I vividly recall being sad and lost, but now I feel a true sense of purpose. I have a one year old daughter, a wife I love and a place in the world as a musician.

"This record is, in part, a sigh of relief I'm not stuck in the quagmire anymore, There’s still some old songs, like 'Jailbird', that I've only just got around to releasing, but there's lots of different kinds of songs too. I have a feeling people like me better sad, but I hope they are in my corner now I can feel and try to express happiness and a sense of fulfillment."

"It’s still new for me, I've built up a vocabulary over 45 years of sadness and maybe five years of joy, I'm still finding my way. On my last album I tried to write a song of love about my daughter but it wound up being about junkies and sleaze. It's taken me a while to meet the challenge, I hope I've done it with songs like 'Diamonds to Coal'."

== Track listing ==
(all tracks by Jim White)

1. "A Town Called Amen" – 3:42
2. "Blindly We Go" – 2:59
3. "Jailbird" – 5:55
4. "Crash Into the Sun" – 4:22
5. "Fruit of the Vine" – 7:50
6. "Take Me Away" – 4:27
7. "Turquoise House" – 3:18
8. "Diamonds to Coal" – 4:36
9. "Counting Numbers in the Air" – 5:20
10. "Plywood Superman" – 5:36
11. "Pieces of Heaven" – 3:07
12. "It's Been a Long Long Day" – 3:51

== Personnel ==
- Jim White – vocals, guitars, harmonica, banjo, Hammond M3, keyboard, mini-vibes
- Byron Isaacs – bass, dobro, stand-up bass, vocals
- Tony Leone – drums, vocals
- Glenn Patscha – keyboards, vocals
- Fiona McBain – vocals
- Mauro Refosco – percussion
- Patrick Hargon – lead guitar
- Tucker Martine – drums, vocals
- Steve Moore – keys, vocals, horns
- Karl Blau – bass, horns, vocals
- Laura Veirs – vocals ("Crash Into the Sun")
- Clyde Petersen – vocals
- Don Chambers – banjo, vocal
- Matt "Pistol" Stoessel – slide guitar, pedal steel
- Lisa Hargon – bass, drums, vocals
- Brandon McDearis – drums
- Vida Wakeman – vocals
- Jeff Burke – banjo, mandolin, vocals
- Michael Deming – recorder, washboard
- Joe Pernice – vocals ("Take Me Away")
- Levon Henry – tenor sax
- Robin Pratt – vocals
- Patrick Warren – keyboards, marxophone
- Chris Riser – stand-up bass
- Amanda Kapousouz – violin

== Appearances in other media ==
- Crash Into the Sun was played during a scene in Life during the episode Re-entry. (Series 2 Episode 13).
