= Where It Hits You =

Studio album by Jim White
- Released: 2012
- Genre: Alternative country
- Length: 58:05
- Label: Yep Roc / Loose
- Producer: Jim White

Jim White chronology
| Transnormal Skiperoo (2007) | Where It Hits You (2012) | Waffles, Triangles & Jesus (2017) |

Professional ratings
Review scores
| Source | Rating |
|---|---|
| AllMusic | link |
| AnyDecentMusic? | link |
| Drowned in Sound | link |
| PopMatters | link |
| Uncut | link |

Where It Hits You is the 2012 album, and 6th solo studio project, by Southern American singer-songwriter and guitarist Jim White. The album was mixed and mastered by John Keane. Guest vocalists on the album include members of the bands Ollabelle, Shak Nasti, and The Heap. There are several guest musicians that helped craft the distinctive and full Alternative Country sound typical of White's productions. The effort and collaboration seems to have been worthwhile, as the album has received numerous favorable critical reviews, just missing the top ten on Exclaim!'s Best Albums of 2012: Folk and Country.

White has stated that he went out on his own and produced and financed the record, feeling that there was no one telling him what he had to do after he left the Luaka Bop record label. As producer of the album, White raised money for funding the project through Kickstarter noting that he ran out of money for the project mid-way through production.

In an interview posted by Yep Roc, the label through which the album was released in the USA, he talks about the project. Musing on the title of the album he states "Titles never come easy to me, but this one did. Long before I recorded a single note I knew what I'd call it. That name, it was just in the air."

Encompassing the tone and content of the album, White stated "I had written these songs over the course of a year full of the emotion and hope . . . " In another interview White expounds "How can, on one record, I expect people to listen from one to the next? It made sense to me – a record is a representation of your psyche at a point in time and space. I think there was a lot of sorrow on the outside, but in the center of me there is still some sense of joy and celebration." The somber songs on the album are certainly part of the landscape but there are also several upbeat, even rousing tracks as well.

== Album Promotion ==
The album was released on CD, MP3, FLAC, and Vinyl LP (180 gram double LP), and was sold in available bundled packages including a t-shirt and mini poster, all with artwork produced by White. Packaging for the album included labeling "featuring 'Infinite Mind' and 'Sunday's Refrain'", the former of which was promoted to radio. Purchase of the album directly from Yep Roc included bonus digital tracks.

On 17 December 21012, via his official Facebook page, White announced the release of a promotional video for the song Infinite Mind. The video featured White and various others exploring visual representations of the Infinite Mind lyrics.

== Behind the songs ==
In various interviews White explains the meaning of songs on the album:

- "What Rocks Will Never Know": is a song about how difficult it is to be a human being, about celebrating the mess of the human experience. The idea came when White drove by a Christmas tree farm with several trees cut down. This made him think about how trees don't know when to run.
- "Sunday's Refrain": is a song to relate that sermons are meaningless sounds. Not a word of them makes sense; it's just noise. "The point where words fail you."
- "Epilogue to a Marriage": "I thought I was writing it about somebody else, but I wasn't. I was writing it about me and didn't know it. Sometimes something is in the air and you intuitively sense it, but you don’t really want to know. So you find conduits for the worry in surrogate material or surrogate human beings or situations. I didn't call it "Epilogue to a Marriage" until after my wife left. Then it sort of made sense. It was called “On the Best of Days" before that. It's about two people who've come to the end of their road together and they just get blown apart by a gust of wind in Arkansas."

== Track listing ==
(all tracks by Jim White)

1. "Chase the Dark Away" – 5:31
2. "Sunday's Refrain" – 5:00
3. "The Way of Alone" – 5:46
4. "State of Grace" – 5:19
5. "Infinite Mind" – 3:23
6. "What Rocks Will Never Know" – 5:03
7. "Here We Go" – 3:04
8. "My Brother's Keeper" – 7:22
9. "That Wintered Blue Sky" – 5:51
10. "Epilogue to a Marriage" – 6:50
11. "Why It's Cool" – 5:02

Bonus Tracks available with order from Yep Roc

1. "Irrational Names Sometimes Lead to Irrational Crimes" – 5:16
2. "I'll Never Know Why" – 3:51

== Personnel ==
All songs by Jim White

Appearing on this album:

- Jim White – guitar, vocals, keys, piano, percussion, programming, flutes & whistles, harmonicas
- Members of Ollabelle (Byron Isaacs, Glenn Patscha, Tony Leone, Fiona McBain) – appear on ("Sunday's Refrain", "Chase the Dark Away", "That Wintered Blue Sky")
- Members of Shak Nasti (Tim Turner, Rion Smith, Matt Lapham) – appear on ("My Brother's Keeper", "Infinite Mind", "State of Grace", "The Way of Alone")
- Members of The Heap (Bryan Howard, Ian Werden, Jeff Rieter, Jack Sterling, Marc Gilley, Chris Costigan, Jeff Crouch) – appear on ("Here We Go")

Solo guest appearances:

- Terri Binion – banjo, acoustic guitar, vocals
- Caroline Herring – vocals
- Will Johnson (Centromatic) – vocals
- Ruby Kendrick – vocals
- Dan Nettles (Kenosha Kid) – electric guitar
- G.C. Hellings (Stanton) – electric guitar
- Mike Ferrio (Tandy) – acoustic guitar, vocals
- Willow – additional piano

Additional players:

- Marlon Patton – drums, percussion, stand up bass, electric bass
- Rob McMaken – dulcimer, acoustic guitar, mandolin, vocals
- Kevin Hyde – trombone
- Andrew Small – bowed double bass, upright bass, cello
- Ash Raymond – fiddle
- Matt "Pistol" Stoessel – pedal steel guitar
- John Keane – pedal steel guitar, acoustic guitar, vocals
- Paige & Rachel Keane – vocals
- Mitch Corbin – mandolin, acoustic guitar
- Jeremy Wheatley – vocals
- David Schweitzer – vocals

All songs mixed by:

- John Keane, except "Why It's Cool" by Marlon Patton

Mastered by:

- John Keane
