= Dubh Essa Níc Eidhin =

Dubh Essa Níc Eidhin, Queen of Moylurg, died 1187.

Dubh Essa was a daughter of an otherwise unknown Ruaidhri Ua hEidhin of Aidhne She was wife to King Conchobar Mac Diarmata.

The Annals of Loch Ce, sub anno 1187, state:

- The Rock of Loch-Cé was burned at mid-day, where a great many people were drowned and burned, along with the daughter of O'hEidhin, i.e. Duibhessa, daughter of Ruaidhri O'hEidhin, wife of Conchobhar Mac Diarmada, king of Magh-Luirg.

== See also ==
- Dubh Essa
- Kings of Uí Fiachrach Aidhne
- Kings of Magh Luirg
