= Donald O'Dowd =

American academic

Donald D. O'Dowd

President of the University of Alaska System
- In office 1984–1990
- Preceded by: Jay Barton
- Succeeded by: Jerome B. Komisar

Personal details
- Born: January 23, 1927 (age 99) Manchester, New Hampshire, U.S.
- Spouse: Jan
- Education: University of Edinburgh; Dartmouth College; Harvard University

Donald Davy O'Dowd (born January 23, 1927) is an American academic. He was the president of the University of Alaska System from 1984 to 1990 and also a former president and chancellor of Oakland University. O'Dowd was a Fulbright Scholar, having attended Dartmouth College. He also attended Harvard University, where he earned a Ph.D. in social psychology.
