= Johnny Dowd =

American singer-songwriter

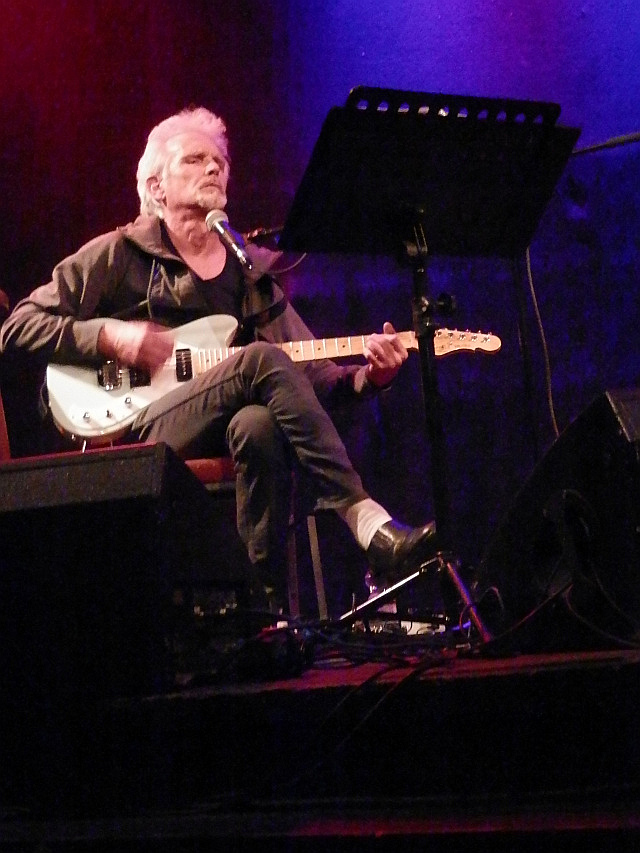

Background information
- Born: John David Dowd; March 29, 1948 (age 78); Fort Worth, Texas, United States
- Origin: Ithaca, New York, United States
- Genre: Alternative country
- Website: www.johnnydowd.com

Johnny Dowd (born John David Dowd; March 29, 1948, in Fort Worth, Texas) is an American alternative country musician from Ithaca, New York. Typical of his style are experimental, noisy breaks in his songs and strong gothic (in the sense of dark and gloomy) elements in the lyrics as well as in the music. There is also a strong undercurrent of black humor and the absurd in his work.

Although his early albums were most celebrated in the alternative country community, he has never quite fit into any particular genre. As a singer-songwriter, his music is most often compared to that of Tom Waits, Nick Cave and Captain Beefheart.

== Early life ==
Born in Fort Worth, Texas in 1948, Dowd's family moved to Memphis, Tennessee in 1950, and then to his father's hometown of Pauls Valley, Oklahoma in 1953. He received a record player for Christmas in 1956 and began buying records at a local appliance store. Although the first LP he owned was by the Ray Conniff Singers, it was the music of Hank Williams, Elvis Presley, Ray Charles and James Brown, that changed his life. He cites James Brown's Live at the Apollo as his lifelong favorite album.

In 1965, along with his mother and sisters, Johnny returned to Memphis after his parents' divorce. After serving in the U.S. Army and living in California he drove across the United States in the early 1970s with longtime friend Dave Hinkle and settled permanently in Ithaca, New York where his mother and sisters had also relocated. Dowd and Hinkle began moving furniture for a living, later naming their business the Zolar Moving Company.

== Band history ==
Dowd formed a band in the 1970s named The Jokers, which included Johnny (guitar), his sister Jennifer Edmondson (drums) and Dave Hinkle (bass). By 1988, the band had become Neon Baptist, who in addition to Dowd included Cally Arthur, Dave Hinkle, Mike Edmondson and Jennifer Edmondson, with Max Ormond and Kim Sherwood-Caso joining the band in later lineups. Neon Baptist was one of the founding acts of the GrassRoots Festival, where Dowd has performed annually since 1991.

By the time Neon Baptist disbanded in 1995, Dowd was recording songs alone in the office of his moving company. These songs first appeared in 1995 on a home-made demo cassette as Wrong Side of Memphis, which credited Dowd as a solo artist and featured Kim Sherwood-Caso on background vocals on two songs. Most of these tracks were either re-mixed or completely re-recorded for the CD version of the same album, which was initially pressed as a self-released CD and then officially released on Chicago's Checkered Past Records label in 1997. The album was also released on Koch Records in early 1998 and then in Europe on Munich Records. Favorable reviews led to some of his first European appearances in 1998.

In the wake of the critical acclaim for Wrong Side of Memphis, Dowd released his second album, Pictures From Life's Other Side, in 1999, also to positive reviews. That year also saw the first of Dowd's US and European tours. After the self-released, experimental Down In The Valley in 2000 came Temporary Shelter. A Dutch television documentary on Dowd was filmed in 2000, and in early 2001, The New York Times highlighted him as one of four "Country Singers Who Still Display a Country Heart".

Dowd's The Pawnbroker's Wife album was released in 2002, followed by Wire Flowers: More Songs from the Wrong Side of Memphis in 2003. That same year, he was handpicked by The Simpsons' creator Matt Groening, a self-described fan of Dowd's music, to perform in the All Tomorrow's Parties festival. He also made his major film appearance in 2003 with Searching for the Wrong-Eyed Jesus. The album Cemetery Shoes was released in 2004. Cruel Words, released in 2006, went on to win the Alt Country award in the 7th Annual Independent Music Awards the following year.

In 2006, Dowd, drummer Brian Wilson (a.k.a. Willie B) and Jim White formed the band Hellwood. Their album, Chainsaw of Life, was recorded in a cabin in New York, the walls of which were covered in musician obituaries. Hellwood toured the album in Europe. In April 2007, Dowd joined Beukorkest, a collaboration of various Dutch musicians and artists, for a nine-show tour of the Netherlands. In 2008, after an album of tracks from the tour was released, Beukorkest re-formed with a new team of musicians.

Dowd released A Drunkard's Masterpiece in early 2008 in the U.S., Canada and Europe, followed by a European tour in April and May. In October, he formed the trio Black Elastic with former bandmates Kim Sherwood-Caso on guitar and vocals and Mike Edmondson on guitar. After several shows in the Ithaca, New York area, an expanded Johnny Dowd band was formed, composed of Sherwood-Caso, Mike Stark (keyboards), Matt Saccuccimorano (drums) and Willie B (baritone guitar). The group released its debut album, Wake Up the Snakes, in 2010. Willie B plays drums and bass pedals on Dowd's Do the Gargon, released in 2013. Dowd's solo album That's Your Wife On The Back Of My Horse was released in 2015 and featured on several tracks the singer/songwriter Anna Coogan from Ithaca. She is also a guest vocalist on Dowd's next album, 2016's Execute American Folklore. The album contains fourteen self-written tracks. All instruments on this album are played by Dowd and it showcases his ability to create an electronic sound.

On June 5, 2018, Dowd announced on his website that he was working on another new album, after the release of Twinkle Twinkle in January of the same year. According to Dowd, the record sounds like "a grungy garage rock thing, circa 1965." Kim Sherwood-Caso again provides vocals on the album. On August 14, 2018, he wrote on his website that the new album would be released on March 1, 2019, titled Family Picnic. Twinkle Twinkle contained jazz and blues covers as well as new versions of traditionals. There is also one new self-penned song on the album. All (electronic) instruments on the album are played by Dowd with guest vocals by Anna Coogan and Michael Edmondson. All fourteen tracks on Family Picnic were written by Dowd; he also played guitar and keyboards on the album. Kim Sherwood-Caso provides backup vocals with Michael Edmondson. Edmondson also played guitar and xylorimba. The album was well received by critics. In November 2019, he released Live at GrassRoots 2006, recorded in Trumansburg, New York in July 2006. The set featured songs that would later turn up on his Wake Up the Snakes album and the Hellwood album Chainsaw of Life.

On March 18, 2021, Dowd announced on his website that he was working on material for a new album, titled Homemade Pie. The album was released in January 2022. On Homemade Pie, Dowd again collaborated with vocalist Kim Sherwood-Caso, Willie B. on drums and Mike Edmondson on guitar and keyboard. Dowd himself was the main vocalist on the album and also played guitar and keyboard. He also wrote the lyrics and the music. The album received generally positive reviews. In September 2021, Dowd contributed the track "Farm Boy" to the album The Wanderer - A Tribute to Jackie Leven. He also recorded a track with Sarah Corina, "Kiss The Sky", in December 2021.

His nineteenth solo studio album, Is Heaven real (How would I know), was released to much acclaim in October 2023.

In 2009, Dowd was a judge for the eighth annual Independent Music Awards to support independent artists' careers.

== Discography ==
=== Studio albums ===
- Wrong Side of Memphis (Checkered Past - USA, Koch Records - USA, Munich Records - Europe) 1997, 1998 and 1998 respectively
- Pictures from Life's Other Side (Koch Records - USA, Munich Records - Europe) 1999
- Down in the Valley (self-released) 2000
- Temporary Shelter (Munich Records - Europe, Koch Records - USA) 2000, 2001 respectively
- The Pawnbroker's Wife (Munich Records - Europe, Catamount - USA) 2002
- Wire Flowers: More Songs from the Wrong Side of Memphis (Munich Records - Europe) 2003
- Cemetery Shoes (Munich Records - Europe, Bongo Beat Records - USA) 2004
- Cruel Words (Bongo Beat Records - USA, Munich Records - Europe) 2006
- A Drunkard's Masterpiece (Munich Records - Europe, Bongo Beat Records - USA) Spring 2008
- Wake Up the Snakes (Munich Records) Spring 2010
- More or Less -Poetry/Music- (Zylaxi Records) Spring 2010
- No Regrets (Mother Jinx Records) Spring 2012
- Do the Gargon (Mother Jinx Records) Summer 2013
- That's Your Wife on the Back of My Horse (Mother Jinx Records) March 2015
- Execute American Folklore (Mother Jinx Records) September 2016
- Twinkle, Twinkle (Mother Jinx Records) January 2018
- Family Picnic (Mother Jinx Records) March 2019
- Homemade Pie (Mother Jinx Records) January 2022
- Is Heaven real (How would I know) (Memphis Record Pressing) October 2023

=== Collaborations ===
- Hellwood - Chainsaw of Life With Jim White and Willie B (Brian Wilson) (Munich, 2006)
- Kiss The Sky With Sarah Corina (One track on SoundCloud, 2021)

=== Live albums ===
- Johnny Dowd Live (self-released) 2001
- Live at the Night & Day Cafe, Manchester, UK (self-released) 2005
- Johnny Dowd Live at Schuba's 2000 (digital released) 2008
- Ratten Spiegel (self-released) 2009
- Live in Morgantown (Mother Jinx Records) December 2014
- Live at Grassroots 2006 (self-released) 2019
- Porchfest Live Show (self-released) 2023
- Live at the Downstairs (Mother Jinx Records) 2025

=== 45s/EPs ===
- Hell or High Water/Divorce, American Style (Nicole, 1999)
- Mother Love/Daddy's Girl (Sub Pop, 2001)
- Lower Manhattan/Bozo (Angry Mom Records, 2012)
- Xmas (Mother Jinx Records, 2021)

=== Exclusive tracks and guest appearances ===
- Various - The UNSOUND Series Volume 2: Guitars! (To M'Lou Music, 1999)
- Various - Awesome No. 1 (a Munich compilation) (Munich, 2001)
- Various - Gimme Shelter 17 Amazing covers of classic songs by The Rolling Stones (Uncut 2002)
- The Pine Valley Cosmonauts - The executioners last songs Vol. 1 (Bloodshot records, 2002)
- Various - Hope isn't a Word (Comes with a Smile Vol. 11) (Comes with a smile, 2004)
- Jim White Presents music from Searching for the Wrong-Eyed Jesus (Luaka Bop, 2005)
- Chicken Legs Weaver - Nowhere (as producer) (Riverside records, 2006)
- Mark Lotterman - Pain & Entertainment (The house of music, 2007)
- Various - There's A Hole In Heaven Where Some Sin Slips Through: Townes van Zandt tribute (Glitterhouse records, 2007)
- Jackie Leven - Oh What A Blow That Phantom Dealt Me! (Cooking Vinyl, 2007)
- Jackie Leven - Lovers at the Gun Club (Cooking Vinyl, 2008)
- Beukorkest - Der Kleine Hausmeister (Munich, 2008)
- Soundtrack The Devil's Muse collaboration with David J Soundtrack included on Deluxe 2-disc DVD set (Halo 8, 2008)
- Love and Rockets tribute album, New Tales to Tell track 2-05 (digital release only) Bound for Hell (with Billy Coté) (Justice Records, October 2009)
- The Jeffrey Lee Pierce Sessions Project - We Are Only Riders (Glitterhouse Records, 2009)
- Anna Coogan & J.D. Foster - Birth of the Stars (Elevate, 2015)
- The Wanderer - A Tribute to Jackie Leven - track "Farm Boy" (Cooking Vinyl, 2021)

=== Also appears on ===
- Uncut February 2001 Track 7: "Big Wave" (UNCUT UG-26 32)(Uncut, 2001)
- Balling The Jack (The Birth Of The Nu-Blues) Track 19: "Picture From Life's Other Side" (Ocho, 2002)
- Total Lee! (Lee Hazlewood tribute) Track 5: "Sleep in the Grass" (City Slang Recordings, 2002)

== DVDs ==
- Searching for the Wrong-Eyed Jesus (2003), BBC documentary about roots music in the US hosted by Jim White. Special guests besides Johnny Dowd are The Handsome Family, David Eugene Edwards and others.
- Take Root festival 2004 Tracks 17 and 18: "A Man and his Wife", "Johnny B. Goode" Recorded October 2, 2004 Assen, The Netherlands. (Music Matters, 2004)

== Books ==
- Johnny Dowd - Poems (self released, 2002) 15 poems with illustrations by Stahl Caso
