= Nace O'Dowd =

Irish Gaelic footballer

Personal information
- Born: 1 August 1931 County Sligo, Ireland
- Died: 16 May 1987 (aged 55) Strandhill, Ireland

Sport
- Sport: Gaelic football
- Position: Midfield
Clubs
- Years: Club
- 1949–1953 1953-1954 1954–1957 1957-1959: Tubbercurry; Castlebar Mitchels; Tubbercurry; Mullinabreena
Club titles
- Sligo titles: 4
Inter-county
- Years: County
- 1949-1959: Sligo

Ignatius "Nace" O'Dowd (1 August 1931 – 16 May 1987) was an Irish Gaelic footballer who played for the Sligo county team in the 1950s and was a member of a number of successful Railway Cup teams.

In 1949 he captained a Sligo team to a Connacht Championship. He made his senior Inter-county debut for Sligo while a teenager and played for the county for eleven years.

O’Dowd was often tasked with marking Galway forward Seán Purcell. Purcell named O'Dowd as one of the players he admired most in GAA football. In 1954 O’Dowd played for Sligo in the Connacht Final, which they narrowly lost to Galway.

He lined out nine times for Connacht in the Railway Cup, helping the province to victory in 1957 and 1958.

O'Dowd played in teams that won four Sligo Club Championships. He won one Mayo title with Castlebar Mitchels and captained his native Mullinabreena to a Sligo Senior Title in 1958.

O'Dowd emigrated to America in 1959 and played in Gaelic Park, New York City. He returned to Ireland in the 1970s.

The Coolaney/Mullinabreena GAA club named their pitch Nace O'Dowd Park in his honour.
