= Aed Ua Dubhda =

Aed Ua Dubhda King of Ui Fiachrach Muaidhe, died 983.

Aed was the son of Cellac, son of Dubda mac Connmhach, who was in turn a grandson of Donn Cothaid mac Cathail, king of Ui Fiachrach Muaidhe (died 772). He was the first person to bear the surname Dowd, though its use in that sense more strictly began with his sons, Mael Ruanaid Ua Dubhda (died 1005) and Gebennac Ua Dubhda (died 1005).

Aed is noted as lord, or king, of all Ui Fiachrach Muaidhe (north Connacht) upon his death in 983. All its subsequent kings and lords descended from him, as do the O'Dowd Chiefs of the Name.

Preceded by Donn Cothaid mac Cathail	Kings of Ui Fiachrach Muaidhe ?–983	Succeeded by Mael Ruanaidh Ua Dubhda
