= Owen Caech Ó Dubhda =

Owen Caech Ó Dubhda (died 1495) was Chief of the Name and Lord of Tireragh.

Owen Caech was the son of a Ruaidhrí Ó Dubhda, though probably not the man who died as king in 1380. The Annals of the Four Masters name him as Owen Caech, the son of Rory O'Dowda, Lord of Tireragh. The contemporary Annals of Ulster list him as Ua Dubda, namely, Eogan Blindeye, son of Ruaidhri Ua Dubda.

Preceded by Maghnus mac Tadhg Buidhe Ó Dubhda?	Ó Dubhda ?–1495	Succeeded by Féilim mac Tadhg Buidhe Ó Dubhda?
