= Muirchertach An Cullach Ua Dubhda =

Muirchertach An Cullach Ua Dubhda (died 1096) was King of Ui Fiachrach Muaidhe.

== Annalistic references ==
- 1096. Muircheartach, i.e. the Boar, O'Dubhda, lord of the Ui-Amhalghadha, was slain by his own tribe.

Preceded by Aedhuar Ua Dubhda	Kings of Ui Fiachrach Muaidhe; 1059?–1096	Succeeded by Domnall Find Ua Dubhda
