= Kings of Ui Fiachrach Muaidhe =

Rulers of ancient kingdom in Ireland

The Kings of Ui Fiachrach Muaidhe were the northern branch of Ui Fiachrach, based on the plain of the Muaidhe (valley of the River Moy).

The early members of the dynasty were Kings of Connacht, but were eclipsed by the Ui Briuin by the 8th century. By the 12th century the ruling dynasty adopted the surname Ó Dubhda

== Ui Fiachrach Muaidhe Kings of Connacht ==
- Dúnchad Muirisci mac Tipraite, d.683
- Indrechtach mac Dúnchado Muirisci, d.707
- Airechtach ua Dunchadh Muirsce, d. 730
- Ailill Medraige mac Indrechtaig, d.764
- Donn Cothaid mac Cathail, d.773

== Kings of Ui Fiachrach Muaidhe ==
- Connmhach mac Duinn Cothaid, died 787
- Cathal mac Ailell, died 812.
- Dubda mac Connmhach, fl. 9th–10th century
- Aed mac Mael Padraig, d. 905
- Mael Cluiche mac Conchobar, d. 909.
- Crichan mac Mael Muire, died 937.
- Aed Ua Dubhda, died 983.
- Mael Ruanaidh Ua Dubhda, d. 1005.
- Aedhuar Ua Dubhda, d. 1059.
- Muirchertach An Cullach Ua Dubhda, d. 1096.
- Domnall Find Ua Dubhda, d. 1125
- Mac Aodh Ua Dubhda, d. 1128.
- Amhlaibh mac Domhnaill Fhinn Ua Dubhda, d. 1135.
- Mac Domhnaill Ua Dubhda, d. 1136.
- Aodh mac Muirchertach Ua Dubhda, died 1143.
- Ruaidhrí Mear Ua Dubhda, Ruaidhri Mear mac Tailtigh mec Neill Ua Dubh, ri o Roba go Codnuigh/(king from [the rivers] Roba to Codhnach.
- An Cosnmhaidh Ua Dubhda, died 1162.
- Taichleach Ua Dubhda, died 1192.
- Donnchadh Ó Dubhda, fl. 1213.
- Maelruanaidh Ó Dubhda, died 1221.
- Brian Dearg Ó Dubhda, d. 1242.
- Taichlech mac Maelruanaid Ó Dubhda, d. 1282.
- Conchobair Ó Dubhda, died 1291.
- Sén-Brian Ó Dubhda, died 1354 King of Ui Fiachrach and Ui Amhalghaid, died in his own house having been 84 years in lordship.
- Donell Ó Dubhda, fl. 1371, died 1380.
- Ruaidhrí Ó Dubhda, fl. 1380–1417
- Tadhg Riabhach Ó Dubhda, d. 1432.

See also O'Dowd Chiefs of the Name.
