= Sén-Brian Ó Dubhda =

Sén-Brian Ó Dubhda (died 1354) was King of Ui Fiachrach Muaidhe.

== Overview ==
In a section (276.14, pp. 626–627) of Leabhar na nGenealach, Dubhaltach Mac Fhirbhisigh writes of the fate of the hereditary proprietors of Ui Fiachrach.

"The English banished these chieftains from their native places (which we have enumerated) until Sein-Bhrian s. Taithleach of the Moy Ó Dubhda captured the country (especially Tireragh) from the English. Although he did capture it, I think that many of the same chieftains did not get hold of much of their native territories since then, for the family, grandsons, and great-grandsons of Sein-Bhrian divided the land among themselves, though they do not possess it today and only a very small portion of the aforesaid chieftains still survive."

This is confirmed in the Annals of the Four Masters, sub anno 1338, which states "Leyny and Corran were laid waste and wrested from the English, and the chieftainship of them assumed by the hereditary Irish chieftains, after the expulsion of the English."

The Annals of the Four Masters record his presence at the Second Battle of Athenry (Brian O'Dowda, Lord of Hy-Fiachrach). He survived, though the dead included Melaghlin Carragh O'Dowda, Conor Oge O'Dowda, Murtough, son of Conor O'Dowda.

Araile do fhlathaibh Ua nDubhda says of him:

- King of Ui Fiachrach and Ui Amhalghaid, died in his own house having been 84 years in lordship.

Preceded by Conchobair Ó Dubhda	Kings of Ui Fiachrach Muaidhe; 1291?–1354	Succeeded by Donell Ó Dubhda
