= Reign =

Period in which a sovereign rules

A reign is the period of a person's or dynasty's occupation of the office of monarch of a nation (such as Saudi Arabia, Belgium and Andorra), of a people (e.g. the Franks and the Zulus) or of a spiritual community (e.g. Catholicism, Tibetan Buddhism and Nizari Ismailism).

In most hereditary monarchies and some elective monarchies, there have been no limits on the duration of a sovereign's reign or incumbency, nor is there a term of office. Thus, a reign usually lasts until the monarch dies, abdicates or is deposed, or unless the monarchy itself is abolished. Other elective monarchies may have a fixed period of time for the duration of the monarch's tenure in office, with one notable example being the King of Malaysia.

The term of a reign can be indicated with the abbreviation "r." (for Latin regnavit/rexit) after a sovereign's name, such as the following:

George VI, King of Great Britain, Ireland and the British Dominions, Emperor of India (r. 1936–1952).

== End of reign ==
A reign can be ended in several ways:

- Abdication
- Abolition of monarchy
- Death
- Deposition

=== Abdication ===
- Emperor Ferdinand I of Austria, King of Hungary and Bohemia, King of Lombardy-Venetia (r. 1835–1848) was abdicated due to his disabilities (feeble-mindedness and epilepsy). His successor, Emperor Franz Josef (r. 1848–1916) reigned for 68 years.
- King Edward VIII of the United Kingdom and the British dominions reigned from January to December 1936 before he abdicated the throne. After his abdication, he became known as the Duke of Windsor. No other monarch of the Kingdom of Great Britain (1707–1800), the United Kingdom of Great Britain and Ireland, the United Kingdom of Great Britain and Northern Ireland, or any dominion or Commonwealth realm has ever abdicated, though forced abdications did occur on rare occasions in the Kingdom of England and the Kingdom of Scotland prior to their merger in 1707.
- Queen Wilhelmina of the Netherlands abdicated in 1948 in favor of her daughter Juliana, who then reigned until 1980 when she abdicated in favor of her daughter, Beatrix, who in turn abdicated in 2013 in favor of her son and heir apparent Willem-Alexander. In all three cases, the monarch lost the title of queen and became a princess after abdicating.

=== Abolition of monarchy ===
- King Louis XVI of France reigned from 1774 until the overthrow of the monarchy in 1792 during the French Revolution. He was executed the following year.
- The Xuantong Emperor of China abdicated in 1912 following the Xinhai Revolution, marking the end of the Chinese monarchy.
- King Umberto II of Italy reigned for only a few weeks in 1946 before the abolition of the Italian monarchy in a referendum.
- King Constantine II of Greece reigned from 1964 until the abolition of the Greek monarchy in 1973.
- Tsar Nicholas II of Russia reigned from 1894 until 1917 when he was forced to abdicate and the Russian Empire was overthrown during the Russian Revolution.
- Emperor Haile Selassie of Ethiopia reigned for over 40 years (1930–1974) until he was forced to abdicate by the Derg when it seized power in a coup, abolishing the 3,000 year old monarchy.
- Shah Mohammad Reza Pahlavi of Iran reigned for more than 37 years (1941–1979) until the Iranian Revolution, which superseded the 2,500 years of monarchy with an Islamic republic system of government. The Shah died the following year and is buried in Cairo.

== See also ==
- Interregnum
- Rex (title)
