= Tireragh =

Barony in County Sligo and County Mayo, Ireland

Barony of Tireragh in Co. Sligo Tír Fhiachrach (Irish)
- Barony
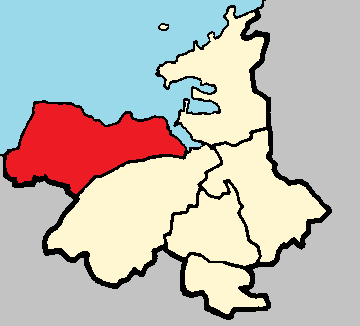
- Country: Ireland
- Province: Connacht
- County: Sligo

Area
  - Land: 431.4 km^{2} (166.6 sq mi)

Population (2016)
  - Total: 7,151

Barony of Tireragh in Co. Mayo Tír Fhiachrach (Irish)
- Barony
- Interactive map of Barony of Tireragh in Co. Mayo
- Country: Ireland
- Province: Connacht
- County: Mayo

Area
  - Land: 38.95 km^{2} (15.04 sq mi)

Population (2016)
  - Total: 2,768

Tireragh (/ˌtɪˈrɛərə/; Irish: Tír Fhiachrach) is a historical barony in Connacht, Ireland. It largely corresponds to the former Gaelic túath of Tír Fhíacrach Múaidhe.

Originally situated solely within the borders of County Sligo, the Local Government (Ireland) Act 1898 altered existing county boundaries, resulting in the traditional baronial lands of Tireragh now falling within the administrative boundaries of both County Sligo and County Mayo.

== History ==
The barony of Tireragh, which is archaically written Tyreragh, was formed as part of the shiring of County Sligo by the Lord Deputy of Ireland Sir Henry Sidney (between 1565-1571; 1575-1578), during the reign of Queen Elizabeth I, as part of the larger Tudor conquest of Ireland.
