= Irish genealogy =

Study of Irish individuals and families

Irish genealogy is the study of individuals and families who originated on the island of Ireland.

== Origins ==
Genealogy was cultivated since at least the start of the early Irish historic era. Upon inauguration, Bards and poets are believed to have recited the ancestry of an inaugurated king to emphasize his hereditary right to rule. With the transition to written culture, oral history was preserved in the monastic settlements. Dáibhí Ó Cróinín believed that Gaelic genealogies came to be written down with or soon after the practice of annalistic records, annals being kept by monks to determine the yearly chronology of feast days (see Irish annals).

Its cultivation reached a height during the Late Medieval Era with works such as Leabhar Ua Maine, Senchus fer n-Alban, Book of Ballymote, De Shíl Chonairi Móir, Book of Leinster, Leabhar Cloinne Maoil Ruanaidh and the Ó Cléirigh Book of Genealogies. This tradition of scholarship reached its zenith with Leabhar na nGenealach, composed mainly between 1649 and 1650 in Galway.

Genealogy had at first served a purely serious purpose in determining the legal rights of related individuals to land and goods. Under Fenechas, ownership of land was determined by Agnatic succession, female ownership being severely limited.

Over time, genealogy was pursued for its own merits by the Gaelic learned classes. From c. 1100, various families such as Ó Cléirigh, Mac Fhirbhisigh, Ó Duibhgeannáin, Mac Aodhagáin and Mac an Bhaird became professional historians. They were often employed by ruling families, the most important of whom included Ó Conchobhair, Ó Neill, Ó Domhnaill, Ó Cellaigh, Mac Murchadha Caomhánach, Mac Carthaigh, Ó Briain, Ó Mael Sechlainn, Mac Giolla Padraig. It also became pervasive among the Anglo-Irish, with the recording of the family trees of FitzGerald, Butler, Burke, Plunkett, Nugent, Bermingham and others.

Some clans, such as Mac Fhirbhisigh and Ó Duibhgeannáin were originally hereditary ecclesiastical families, while others (Ó Cléirigh, Mac an Bhaird, Ó Domhnallain) were dispossessed royalty who were forced to find another profession (see also Irish medical families).

The transmission of this body of lore (Irish: seanchas) has resulted in detailed knowledge on the origins and history of many of the tribes and families of Ireland. An anglicized tradition has continued since the 17th-century, translating many of the scripts into English. The practice of genealogy continues to be of importance among the Irish and its diaspora. Historians (such as Dáibhí Ó Cróinín and Nollaig Ó Muraíle) consider the Irish genealogical tradition to have the largest national corpus in Europe.

== Irish genealogical dogma ==
Over the course of several centuries, an evolving genealogical dogma created by the bardic tradition viewed all Irish as descendants of Míl Espáine. This ignored variant traditions, including those recorded in their own works. The reasons behind the doctrine's adoption are rooted in the policies of dynastic and political propaganda.

The doctrine dates from the 10th–12th centuries, as demonstrated in the works of Eochaid ua Flainn (936–1004); Flann Mainistrech (d. 1056); Tanaide (d. c. 1075); and Gilla Cómáin mac Gilla Samthainde (fl. 1072). Many of their compositions were incorporated into the compendium Lebor Gabála Érenn.

It was enhanced and embedded in the tradition by successive generations of historians such as Seán Mór Ó Dubhagáin (d. 1372), Gilla Íosa MacFhirbhisigh (fl. 1390–1418) and Flann Mac Aodhagáin (fl. 1640). By 1600 it was refined to the point that certain Anglo-Irish families were given spurious Gaelic ancestors and origin legends, such was their immersion in Gaelic culture.

The first Irish historian who questioned the reliability of such accounts was Dubhaltach Mac Fhirbhisigh (d. 1671), whose massive Leabhar na nGenealach included disparate and variant recensions. Unlike Geoffrey Keating's Foras Feasa ar Éirinn, he did not attempt to synthesize the material into a unified whole, instead recording and transmitting it unaltered. However, historians as late as such as Eugene O'Curry (1794–1862) and John O'Donovan (1806–1861) sometimes accepted the doctrine and a nationalistic interpretation of Irish history uncritically. During the 20th century the doctrine was reinterpreted by the work of historians such as Eoin MacNeill, T. F. O'Rahilly, Francis John Byrne, Kathleen Hughes (historian), and Kenneth Nicholls.

See also O'Rahilly's historical model, Genetic history of Europe, Genetic history of the British Isles.

== Genealogical compilations ==
The following are manuscripts consisting of genealogies in whole or part.

- Leabhar Adhamh Ó Cianáin
- Book of Ballymote
- The Book of the Burkes
- Leabhar Cloinne Maoil Ruanaidh
- Crichaireacht cinedach nduchasa Muintiri Murchada
- Cuimre na nGenealach
- Leabhar na nGenealach
- Great Book of Lecan
- An Leabhar Muimhneach
- Ó Cléirigh Book of Genealogies
- Leabhar Ua Maine
- Rawlinson B 502
- Senchus fer n-Alban
- Leabhar Clainne Suibhne
- Book of Leinster
- Book of Lecan
- MS H.2.7
- MS Laud 610

== Lost works ==
- Psalter of Cashel
- Book of Cuanu
- Book of Dub Dá Leithe
- Leabhar Airis Cloinne Fir Bhisigh
- Leabhar Airisen Ghiolla Iosa Mhec Fhirbhisigh
- Synchronisms of Flann Mainstreach
- The Chronicle of Ireland
- Norse and Norse-Gaelic pedigrees from the Great Book of Lecan (section)

== Organisations ==
- Irish Genealogical Office
- Genealogical Society of Ireland
- Council of Irish Genealogical Organisations

== Burke's Peerage and Landed Gentry ==
- Burke's Peerage
- Burke's Landed Gentry

== 21st-century Irish genealogy ==
- Who Do You Think You Are? (Irish TV series)

== Notable Irish genealogists ==
- Eochaid ua Flannacáin, 936–1004
- Flann Mainistrech, d. 1056
- Gilla Cómáin mac Gilla Samthainde, fl. 1072
- Gilla Críst Ua Máel Eóin, d. 1127
- Amhlaoibh Mór mac Fir Bhisigh, d. 1138
- Gilla na Naemh Ua Duinn, d. 1160
- Giolla Íosa Mac Fir Bisigh, d. 1301
- Tanaide Mor mac Dúinnín Ó Maolconaire, d. 1310
- Domnall Ó Cuindlis, d. 1342
- Lúcás Ó Dalláin, fl. 14th-century
- Seán Mór Ó Dubhagáin, d. 1372
- Adhamh Ó Cianáin, d. 1373
- Ádhamh Cúisín, fl. c. 1400
- Murchadh Ó Cuindlis, fl. 1398–1411
- Giolla Íosa Mór Mac Fhirbhisigh, d. 1418
- Giolla na Naomh Ó hUidhrín, d. 1420
- Giolla na Naomh Mac Aodhagáin, d. c. 1443
- Geoffrey Keating, 1569–1644
- Cú Choigcríche Ó Cléirigh, fl. 1624–1664
- Dubhaltach Mac Fhirbhisigh, compiler of Leabhar na nGenealach, d. 1671
- James Terry, Jacobite Officer of Arms, d. 1725
- Charles O'Conor (historian), 1710–1791
- John Burke, creator of Burke's Peerage, 1787–1848
- William Betham, Ulster King of Arms, d. 1853
- John O'Donovan (scholar), 1806–1861
- John O'Hart, popular genealogical writer, 1824–1902
- Edward MacLysaght, Chief Herald, d. 1984
- Nollaig Ó Muraíle, academic historian, b. 1948
