= Leabhar Ua Maine =

14th-century Middle Irish manuscript

- Royal Irish Academy
- Also known as: The Book of Hy-Many, Leabhar Uí Dubhagáin
- Type: Compilation of Irish legends
- Date: 1392–94
- Place of origin: Uí Maine
- Language: Middle Irish
- Scribe(s): Ádhamh Cúisín, Faolán Mac an Ghabhann na Scéal
- Patron: Muircheartach mac Pilib Ó Ceallaigh
- Material: Vellum
- Size: 44cm x 27cm
- Format: Folio
- Script: Irish minuscule

Leabhar Ua Maine (also Leabhar Uí Dubhagáin, Book of Uí Maine, Book of Hy-Many and RIA MS D ii 1) is an Irish genealogical compilation, created c. 1392–94.

== History ==
Previously known as Leabhar Uí Dubhagáin, after Seán Mór Ó Dubhagáin (died 1372) of the prominent family of historians and musicians in East Galway, it was later also known as the Book of the O'Kelly's, written at the behest of Muircertach Ó Ceallaigh (d. 1407), Bishop of Clonfert (1378–93) and then Archbishop of Tuam (1393–1407).

The book was written by ten scribes in Uí Mháine not before 1392 and sometime after 1394. There were ten scribes, eight of whom are anonymous. The principal scribe and overall compiler of the manuscript was Ádhamh Cúisín (fl. c.1400); the only other scribe known by name is Faolán Mac an Ghabhann na Scéal (d. 1423).

It is a massive, oversized vellum book written in Irish. It was property of the O'Kelly clan until 1757, when it was sold to William Betham. In 1814, Betham proceeded to sell the manuscript to the Richard Temple-Nugent-Brydges-Chandos-Grenville, 1st Duke of Buckingham and Chandos. His grandson Richard Temple-Nugent-Brydges-Chandos-Grenville, 3rd Duke of Buckingham and Chandos then donated the manuscript to the Royal Irish Academy in 1883, where it is currently housed.

== Contents ==
The manuscript is a massive, oversized vellum book written in Irish, its contents are described by one of the scribes as bolg an tsolathair (a mixed bag of contents). It includes a series of metrical dindsenchas, An Banshenchas, Cormac's Glossary, Lebor na Cert, portions of Lebor Gabála, poems, genealogies and pedigrees.

The largest single section is devoted to the origins and genealogies of the Ó Ceallaigh dynasty of Uí Maine, its contents updated to the time of compilation.

Works found in this work are quatrains paying tribute to the long reign and continuing prosperity of the Uí Dhiarmada (i.e., the descendants of Diarmuid Mac an Bháird), praising the Mac an Bhairds in their capacity as Chiefs of Cinél Rechta Soghain of east-central County Galway.

== Lost material ==
Some forty folios have become detached and lost. One fragment is preserved as folios 17–19 of London, British Library, MS Egerton 90.

Dubhaltach MacFhirbhisigh drew upon some of the missing material while writing Leabhar na nGenealach at Galway in 1649–1650. Texts he utilised included Seanchas Síl Ír, and perhaps Clann Ollamhan Uaisle Eamhna. Material was also incorporated into Cuimre na nGenealach, written in early to mid-1666. MacFhirbhisgh's transcriptions are noted by Nollaig Ó Muraíle as being very faithful compared to surviving portions.

A catalogue was made of the manuscript's contents in the seventeenth century, while it was in the possession of Sir James Ware and before the subsequent loss of certain folios. This reveals it also to have included, at that time, texts like Lebor Gabála Érenn and Acallam na Senórach.

== See also ==
- An Leabhar Muimhneach
- Irish genealogy
- Leabhar Adhamh Ó Cianáin
- Leabhar Cloinne Maoil Ruanaidh
- Leabhar na nGenealach
- Ó Cléirigh Book of Genealogies
- Rawlinson B 502
