= List of Irish manuscripts =

This is a list of manuscripts produced in Ireland as well as other manuscripts of Irish interest, including both vellum and paper manuscripts.

Library	MS catalogue no.	Date	Description
Brussels, Royal Library of Belgium (Bibliothèque Royale)	3410	1629	Paper manuscript.
Brussels, Royal Library of Belgium	5100-4	17th century	Transcripts by Mícheál Ó Cléirigh from a book written by Siodrach Ua Mael Conaire in 1533.
Brussels, Royal Library of Belgium	5301-20	after 1643	Paper manuscript.
Cambridge, Cambridge University Library	Book of Deer	9/10th century, with later additions	Gospelbook of the 9/10th century, with 12th-century additions in Scottish Gaelic. Images
Chatsworth	Book of Lismore	c. 1500	Mainly religious texts.
Dublin, National Library of Ireland	G 1 (olim Phillipps 4169)	16th century	Parchment manuscript; main scribe: Pilip Ballach hua Duibhgeandáin.
Dublin, National Library of Ireland	G 2 (olim Phillipps 7021)	14th–15th centuries	Parchment manuscript; main scribe: Ádam Ó Cianáin.
Dublin, National Library of Ireland	G 3 (olim Phillips MS 7022); Book of Ádhamh Ó Cianáin	14th–15th centuries	Includes Irish verse.
Dublin, National Library of Ireland	G 4 (olim Phillips MS 8214)	1391	Fragment which previously belonged to the core of the Yellow Book of Lecan.
Dublin, National Library of Ireland	G 7	16th century	
Dublin, National Library of Ireland	G 8 (olim Phillips MS 9750); Book of Éumann Ó Bolgaoi	16th century	Medical manuscript on paper and parchment.
Dublin, National Library of Ireland	G 10 (olim Phillips MS 10266)	16th century	Composite manuscript on parchment.
Dublin, National Library of Ireland	G 11 (olim Phillips MS 10297)	2nd quarter of the 15th century	Medical tracts translated from Latin to Irish, followed by a small section of legal material. Parchment; main scribe: Donnchadh Ua Bolgaidhi.
Dublin, National Library of Ireland	G 1200; Book of Magauran / Leabhar Méig Shamhradháin	14th century	Duanaire (poetry anthology). Main scribes: Ruaidhrí Ó Cianáin, Doighre Ó hUiginn.
Dublin, National Library of Ireland	G 1303; Leabhar Í Eadhra (Book of O'Hara)	1597	Bardic poetry in Irish. Parchment manuscript.
Dublin, Royal Irish Academy	23 D 17		
Dublin, Royal Irish Academy	23 E 29; Book of Fermoy	15th–16th century	Composite manuscript, three parts: I (pp. 1–16); II (pp. 17–216); III (pp. 217–24). Part preserved as Egerton 92 (see there).
Dublin, Royal Irish Academy	23 K 44	1721–1722	Paper MS
Dublin, Royal Irish Academy	23 N 10	c. 1575	Compiled by scribes of the Ó Maolconaire. Formerly MS Betham 145, after its former owner William Betham.
Dublin, Royal Irish Academy	23 P 2 Great Book of Lecan	c. 1380 x 1417	
Dublin, Royal Irish Academy	23 P 3	1467 (first part)	Composite manuscript, consisting of three parts.
Dublin, Royal Irish Academy	23 P 12; Book of Ballymote	1384–1406	
Dublin, Royal Irish Academy	24 P 26; Book of Fenagh	16th century	
Dublin, Royal Irish Academy	23 Q 6	15th–16th century	Composite manuscript, five parts.
Dublin, Royal Irish Academy	24 P 25	16th century	
Dublin, Royal Irish Academy	B IV 1	1671–1674	Paper manuscript.
Dublin, Royal Irish Academy	B IV 1A	17th century?	Paper manuscript.
Dublin, Royal Irish Academy	B IV 2	1627–1628	Paper manuscript.
Dublin, Royal Irish Academy	C I 2	15th–16th century?	
Dublin, Royal Irish Academy	C III 2	1552	
Dublin, Royal Irish Academy	C VI 3	early 17th century	Paper manuscript.
Dublin, Royal Irish Academy	D IV 2	15th century	
Dublin, Trinity College	52; Book of Armagh	9th century	
Dublin, Trinity College	1289 (olim H.1.15)	1729–1745	Paper manuscript.
Dublin, Trinity College	1291 (olim H.1.17)	1755	Paper manuscript.
Dublin, Trinity College	1298 (olim H.2.7)	c. 1340–1350	Irish genealogies, tales.
Dublin, Trinity College	1308 (olim H.2.12, no. 8)	15th century?	
Dublin, Trinity College	1316 (olim H.2.15a)	various	Composite manuscript, including Senchas Már material written down c. 1350.
Dublin, Trinity College	1318 (olim H.2.16); Yellow Book of Lecan	14th/15th century	Composite manuscript
Dublin, Trinity College	1336 (olim H.3.17)	15th and 16th centuries	Miscellany
Dublin, University College	Psalter of Caimín	11th century	Fragment
Edinburgh, National Library of Scotland	No. V	14th–15th century?	
Edinburgh, National Library of Scotland	No. XL		Composite manuscripts (five parts).
Edinburgh, National Library of Scotland	No. XXVIII	14th century?	
Edinburgh, National Library of Scotland	No. XXXVI	1690–1691	Paper manuscript.
London, British Library	Additional 30512	15th–16th century	
London, British Library	Additional 33993	16th century	Composite manuscript: I (ff. 1–19) and II (ff. 20–29).
London, British Library	Cotton Nero A 7	16th century?	Composite manuscript, e.g. Bretha Nemed Toísech
London, British Library	Egerton 88	c. 1564	Collection of medieval Irish legal texts, literature, grammatical works and legal glossaries
London, British Library	Egerton 92		Part detached from Book of Fermoy (see Dublin, Royal Irish Academy, 23 E 29).
London, British Library	Egerton 93	15th century (part I); 16th century (parts II–III)	Composite manuscript in three parts: I (ff. 1–19); II (ff. 20–25); III (ff. 26–35).
London, British Library	Egerton 1781	c. 1484–1487	
London, British Library	Egerton 1782	c. 1517	
London, British Library	Harleian 432	early 16th century	Parchment.
London, British Library	Harleian 5260	16th century	Parchment.
London, British Library	Lansdowne 418		e.g. Annals of Duisk
Oxford, Bodleian Library	Laud misc. 610	c. 1453–1454	Irish genealogies. Images online.
Oxford, Bodleian Library	Rawlinson B.475	early 17th century	Irish account of the Norman invasion of Ireland, based on an English version of Gerald of Wales' Expugnatio Hibernica; medieval and early modern Irish poems
Oxford, Bodleian Library	Rawlinson B.488	14th–17th centuries	Includes the Annals of Tigernach
Oxford, Bodleian Library	Rawlinson B.489	early 16th century	Annals of Ulster
Oxford, Bodleian Library	Rawlinson B.498		Irish charters, e.g. of the "Palmer's Hospital" (Priory and Hospital of St. John the Baptist without the New Gate, Dublin); of the Order of Fratres Cruciferi; additions.
Oxford, Bodleian Library	Rawlinson B.499	1526	Transcripts of deeds of Thomas Court (Augustinian Abbey of St. Thomas the Martyr), Dublin.
Oxford, Bodleian Library	Rawlinson B.501		Registrum de Kilmainham
Oxford, Bodleian Library	Rawlinson B.502		
Oxford, Bodleian Library	Rawlinson B.503	11th–15th centuries	Annals of Inisfallen
Oxford, Bodleian Library	Rawlinson B.506		
Oxford, Bodleian Library	Rawlinson B.512		
Oxford, Bodleian Library	Rawlinson B.514		
Stockholm	Vitterhet Engelsk, II.	16th century	Parchment.

== See also ==
- Cín Dromma Snechtai
- Irish Manuscripts Commission

== Sources ==
- General:
  - Corthals, Johan. "Manuscript Sources to Old and Middle Irish Tales (MS-Omit)".
- Brussels:
  - Van den Gheyn, Joseph (1905). Catalogue des manuscrits de la Bibliothèque Royale de Belgique. Brussels.
- Dublin
  - Mulchrone, Kathleen; et al. (1926–70). Catalogue of Irish Manuscripts in the Royal Irish Academy. Dublin.
  - Abbott, T.K.; Gwynn, E.J. (1921). Catalogue of the Irish manuscripts in the Library of Trinity College, Dublin. Dublin.
- Cambridge
  - De Brún, P.; Herbert, M. (1986). Catalogue of Irish manuscripts in Cambridge libraries. Cambridge.
  - James, M.R. (1909–1913). A Descriptive Catalogue of the Manuscripts in the Library of Corpus Christi College, Cambridge. Cambridge.
