= Mac Fhirbhisigh =

Family of Irish hereditary historians

Forbes Mac Fhirbhisigh
- Parent house: Ui Fiachrach
- Country: Kingdom of Connacht
- Founder: Fearbiseach mac Domhnall Óg
- Titles: Ollam to the Ui Fiachrach Muaidhe

MacFirbis (Irish: Mac Fhirbhisigh), also known as Forbes, was the surname of a family of Irish hereditary historians based for much of their known history at Lecan, Tireragh (now Lackan, Kilglass parish, County Sligo). They claimed descent from Dathí (d.418?/428?), said to be one of the last pagan Kings of Connacht, and were thus one of the many families who sprang from the Uí Fiachrach dynasty. The progenitors of the MacFirbis family descend from Amhailgadh, whose brothers included Fiachra Ealg (ancestor of O'Dowd) and Eocha Breac (ancestor of O'Shaughnessy).

== History ==
Based initially at Cong, the family may have been erenaghs prior to becoming historians and genealogists to the Ui Fiachrach Muaidhe (branch of the Uí Fiachrach based in north Connacht) and several other patrons. While this was their main function, they also appear to have served as poets and brehons to their patrons, possibly even musicians.

Among the earliest known members of the family were Amhlaoibh Mór mac Fir Bhisigh (died 1138), Domhnall na Sgoile Mac Fir Bhisigh (fl.c. 1250) and Gilla Isa Mac Fir Bisigh, who died in 1301.

In the late medieval era the most well known was Giolla Íosa Mór Mac Fhirbhisigh fl. 1390–1418. The Mac Fhirbhisigh, long after moving to Lecan (Lacken), Tireragh, built Lacken Castle (Castle Forbes, 54.242°N 9.072°W), now ruined, in Kilglass parish in 1560. Here they kept a school of poetry and history. They lost possession of the castle before 1625.

Fear Dorcha MacFhirbhisigh (fl.c. 1600?) was noted as well-travelled in Scotland, showing how far afield members of the clan would venture in practising their art. Dubhaltach MacFhirbhisigh (fl.c.1640-January 1671) compiled Leabhar na nGenealach, a massive compilation of Irish genealogies.

== See also ==
- Fear Bisigh mac Domhnaill Óig
- Great Book of Lecan
- Yellow Book of Lecan
- Ó Duibhgeannáin
- Irish genealogy

== Sources ==
- The Celebrated Antiquary, Nollaig Ó Muraíle, Maynooth, 1996.
- Irish Leaders and Learning Through the Ages, Fr. Paul Walsh, 2004. (ed. Nollaig Ó Muraíle).
- John O'Donovan (ed., trans.), The Genealogies, Tribes, and Customs of Hy-Fiachrach, Commonly Called O'Dowda's Country, Irish archaeological society, 1993, p. 168.
