= Faolán Mac an Ghabhann na Scéal =

Irish writer and genealogist (died 1423)

Faolán Mac an Ghabhann na Scéal, died 1423, was an Irish writer and genealogist. He was one of the ten scribes of Leabhar Ua Maine, commissioned by Archbishop of Tuam, Muircertach Ó Ceallaigh (died 1407). His poem, Adham ar n-athair uile is penned in the text by Ádhamh Cúisín. Nothing else seems to be known of him.

== See also ==
- An Leabhar Muimhneach
- Irish genealogy
- Leabhar Adhamh Ó Cianáin
- Leabhar Cloinne Maoil Ruanaidh
- Leabhar na nGenealach
- Ó Cléirigh Book of Genealogies
- Rawlinson B 502
