= Yellow Book of Lecan =

1391 Irish miscellaneous manuscript

Leabhar Buidhe Leacáin
- Trinity College Library
- Also known as: Yellow Book of Lecan
- Date: Between 1391 and 1401
- Place of origin: Lecan
- Language(s): Middle Irish
- Scribe(s): Giolla Íosa Mór Mac Fhirbhisigh et al.
- Material: Vellum
- Size: 32 cm × 22 cm
- Format: Folio
- Script: Irish minuscule
- Contents: Ulster Cycle etc.

The Yellow Book of Lecan (YBL; Irish: Leabhar Buidhe Leacáin), or TCD MS 1318 (olim H 2.16), is a late medieval Irish manuscript. It contains much of the Ulster Cycle of Irish mythology, besides other material. It is held in the Library of Trinity College Dublin.

== Overview ==
Location of Lecan (Leacán) in Ireland

The manuscript is written on vellum and contains 344 columns of text. The first 289 were written by 1391; the remainder were written by 1401. It is written in Middle Irish. Lecan was the site of the Mac Fhirbhisigh school of poetry in the territory of Tír Fhíacrach Múaidhe, now Lackan in Kilglass parish, County Sligo (54.242°N 9.072°W). The manuscript is currently housed at Trinity College Dublin. It should not be confused with the Great Book of Lecan.

The book contains nearly the whole of the Ulster Cycle, including a partial version of the Táin Bó Cúailnge which is a compilation of two or more earlier versions, indicated by the number of duplicated episodes and references to other versions in the text. (Note: Reference is made to the fragmented nature of the story in a related tale, Do Fhallsigud Tána Bó Cuailnge ("The rediscovery of the Táin Bó Cuailnge"), in the Book of Leinster, which begins: "The poets of Ireland one day were gathered around Senchán Torpéist, to see if they could recall the Táin Bó Cuailnge in its entirety. But they all said they knew only parts of it." Thomas Kinsella (trans., 1969), The Táin, Oxford University Press.) This incomplete Táin Bó Cúailnge overlaps with the partial version given in the Book of the Dun Cow; the complete text known today was derived from the combination of these recensions. The version of Fergus mac Róich's death tale in the Yellow Book of Lecan is the oldest one that survives. The Yellow Book of Lecan also contains parts of the Táin Bó Flidhais or the Mayo Táin, a tale set in Erris, County Mayo.

In addition to that material which would be placed with certainty within the Ulster Cycle, the book has a later version of The Voyage of Máel Dúin, a collection of Irish triads, and the same ogham tract as is recorded in the Book of Ballymote. Also of note is Suidiugud Tellaich Temra ("The settling of the manor of Tara"). It contains a story of the life of Saint Patrick as told by Fintan mac Bóchra that contains the account of Trefuilngid Tre-eochair, a giant at the Hill of Tara who is first to hear about the crucifixion of Jesus Christ. (Note: Trefuilngid's contradicts the well-known story death tale of Conchobar mac Nessa (also contained in the Yellow Book of Lecan) that states the king knew of Christ's death when it happened and dropped dead because of the fact.)

== History ==
Edward Lhuyd obtained the book from one of two sources; Ruaidhrí Ó Flaithbheartaigh about March 1700 at An Pháirc, An Spidéal; or from Dáithí Óg Ó Dubhda of Bunnyconnellan, County Sligo, in the same year. Ó Flaithbheartaigh and Ó Dubhda would have obtained them from Dubhaltach Mac Fhirbhisigh, whose family created and preserved the book. Lhuyd bound together seventeen manuscripts as a single volume and dubbed them The Yellow Book of Lecan.

Some of the manuscripts were written by Giolla Íosa Mór Mac Fhirbhisigh between c.1398 and c.1417. Nollaig Ó Muraíle calls it

a great composite manuscripts. Ninety-nine folios of Giolla Isa's survive (which may be termed, for convenience, 'Leabhar Giolla Íosa' – LGÍ), containing some of the most important Irish literary texts from the Old and Middle Irish periods, including the only (virtually) complete copy of Rescension I of Táin Bó Cúailnge. Two colophons by Giolla Íosa indicate 1392 as the date of writing, though the work may not have been brought to completion for some years after that

Giolla Íosa was assisted by his student, Murchadh Ó Cuindlis. Ó Cuinnlis penned an excellent manuscript in east Ormond (now County Tipperary in 1398–99) which is now part of YBL.

Giolla Íosa wrote that he "wrote this book for himself and for his son after him", and elsewhere, that it was "for himself and his family after him."

Ó Muraíle further states: "That is one index of Giolla Íosa Mac Fir Bhisigh's importance; to his scribal labours we owe the preservation of the most celebrated of medieval Irish tales, Táin Bó Cúailnge." (p. 23) YBL also contains Aided Nath Í, Togail Bruidne Dá Derga, Táin Bó Fraích, Longes ma nUislenn; Dá Brón Flatha Nime and Mesca Ulad by his son, Tomás Cam Mac Firbhisigh.

In 1986 (see below) Professor Tomás Ó Concheanainn stated his belief that much of the Yellow Book of Lecan/Leabhar Giolla Íosa was derived from Leabhar Gleann Dá Locha (The Book of Glendalough) and Lebor na Nuachongbála now The Book of Leinster.

A fragment of the Yellow Book is in the hand of Solamh Ó Droma, one of the three scribes of the Book of Ballymote.

Lhuyd derived the title from a note by Ciothruadh Mac Fhirbhisigh:

[Leab]ar an Buide Leacain anim an leabhair so; mise Cirruaidh mac Taidg Ruaidh The Yellow Book of Lecan is the name of this book; I am Ciothruagh son of Taidg Ruaidh

== Contents ==
The numbering for the texts given below is both by column (as in the manuscript) and by number of pagination (as in the facsimile edition). The titles here do not necessarily refer to the titles given in the manuscript (if any), but conform to those of the main recensions. (Note: The list of contents here follows Abbott, T.K.; Gwynn, E.J., eds. (1921), Catalogue of the Irish manuscripts in the Library of Trinity college, pp. 94–110)

| columns | page | text |
|---|---|---|
| 1–2 | 436-7 | Life of St. Féchín of Fore (fragment 1) |
| 3–87 | 255, 283 | Sanas Cormaic 'Cormac's Glossary', text B |
| 88–122 | 421-31 | Etymological tract: O'Mulconry's Glossary |
| 123-4 | 432-3 | One leaf with the beginning of Togail Bruidne Da Derga |
| 125-8 | 434-5 | Life of St. Féchín of Fore (fragment 2) |
| 128–216 | 361–404 | Duanaire or Book of Miscellaneous Poems, written by Seanchan, son of Maelmuire O'Maelchonaire in 1473. Includes Aibidil Luigne maic Éremóin 'The alphabet of Luigne mac Éremóin'. |
| 217 | 405 | Cáin Domnaig 'The Law of Sunday' |
| 221 | 407 | Regula Mochuta Raithin |
| 224 | ? | On the Célí Dé. |
| 227 (line 8) | 410 | Rhapsody of the Irish prophet Bec mac Dé |
| 228b (line 17) | 410 | Apgitir Chrábaid (maxim) |
| 229a (line 42) | 411 | Bríathra Flainn Fhína maic Ossu 'The wise sayings of Flann Fína Or Aldfrith, son of Oswiu'. |
| 233 | 413 | 96-line poem ascribed to Flann Fína |
| 234 (line 3) – 236 | 413b–414b | Audacht Morainn 'The Testament of Morann', in the genre of Speculum principum or 'Mirror of princes' |
| 236 | 414 | Trecheng Breth Féne, known as the "Triads of Ireland". |
| 244 | 418 | Tech Midchuarta (plan and description). |
| 245 | 419 | Suidigud Tige Midchuarta (poem). |
| 247 | 420 | Short account of the twelve Apostles |
| 248 | 420 | Poem ascribed to Cormac mac Cuilennáin |
| 249 | 284 | History of the Jews from Abraham to David. |
| 281–310 | | Cath Maige Rath 'The Battle of Mag Rath' (cols 281-2 barely legible). Cf: cols 945–9. |
| 310 | 313b–318b | Aided Muirchertaig meic Erca 'The Death of Muirchertach mac Ercae' |
| 320 (line 14) | 318 | Poem ascribed to Columcille |
| 321 | 319 | Fled Dúin na nGéd 'The Banquet of the Fort of the Geese' |
| 332 (line 45). | 324 | First rann by Mac Liag, bard of Brian Boru. |
| 333 | 325 | Fianṡruth, list A |
| 335 | 326 | Short account of St. Cuimín Fota, metrical dialogue between him and St Comgan (Mac Da Cherda 'The son of two arts') |
| 336 | 326 | Metrical prayer by St. Mael Isa O'Brallaghan |
| 336 (line 17) | 326 | Scúap Chrábaid 'Besom of Devotion', litany ascribed to Colcu ua Duinechda |
| between 336 and 337 | | small scrap of vellum |
| 338 (line 4) | 327 | Irish Litany to the Holy Trinity (first words in Latin: "O Deus Pater omnipotens, Deus exercituum, miserere nobis") |
| 338b (line 4) | 327 | List of Archbishops of Armagh from St. Patrick to Giolla Mac Liag (Gelasius). |
| 338b (line 69) | 327 | Short genealogical account of the Clann Breasail |
| 339 | 328 | Frithfolaid ríg Caisil fri túatha Muman 'The counter-obligations of the king of Cashel towards the peoples of Munster' (first recension). |
| 340 | | Poem ascribed to St. Moling, entitled Baile Moling 'St Moling's Ecstasy/Prophecy' (47 stanzas) (Note: The poem is also cited in § 6 of Vita Sancti Moling '. Eugene O'Curry dates the poem's composition to the period of Diarmait Mac Murchada, but before his banishment—i.e. 1137–1367 Lectures on the Manuscript Materials of Ancient Irish History, 1860, pp. 420–1) |
| 341 | 329 | Tochmarc Moméra 'The Wooing of Moméra' |
| 343 (line 31) | 331 | Various extracts: 1. how Finn mac Cumaill made peace between Glangressach, chief ollam of the Meic Miled, and Sodelb, daughter of Cormac; 2. Aided Fergusa maic Roig 'The Death of Fergus mac Róich' (how Fergus mac Róich went to Connaught after his murder of the sons of Usnech, and of his death); 3. the arrival of Silvius, grandson of Ascanius, in Britain. |
| 344 (line 31) | 330 | Account of celebrated trees of Ireland prostrated by a storm in the year 665. |
| 344 (line 54) | 330 | Account of St. Bec mac Dé. |
| 345 (ff. 6) | 331 | Táin Bó Flidhais (fragment). |
| 365-6 | | A short account of the mother and five sisters of St. Patrick. |
| 367-8 | | Illegible |
| after 368 | | Inserted letter written by Thaddæus Roddy of Crossfield in 1700 |
| 370 | i | Fragment of 8 ff. Immram curaig Maíle Dúin 'The voyage of Máel Dúin's coracle'. On ff. 380–1, a footnote reads "The Yellow [Book] of Lecan is the name of this book. I [am] Cirroe, the son of Teige Roe." |
| 391 (line 16) | 11 | Immram Snédgusa ocus Maic Riagla 'The Voyage of Snedgus and Mac Riagla' |
| 395 (line 37) | 13 | Immram Brain maic Febail 'The Voyage of Bran mac Febaill' |
| 397 (line 8 from foot) | | Irish homily |
| 400 (line 26) or 399 (?) | 16 | Echtra Condla 'The adventure of Connla'. Cf: cols 914–5. |
| 401 | 438–455 | Fragment of nine ff. Dindsenchas of Tara and Aicill, all down to Slíab Mairge. The dindsenchas on Tara includes Turim Tigi Temrach "The enumeration of the House of Tara" (cols. 403). |
| 437a-450 | 341–66 | Medical treatise (fragment, 10 ff). See further col. 463, 465–6 |
| 477–86 | 454–7 | Medical treatise on four elements (fragment), de semine animalium; de virihus animalium. |
| 487–99 | 456–62 | Commentary on seventh book of the Aphorisms of Hippocrates (2–59), ascribed to Gillapatrick Albanach in 1413 on the penultimate page. These ff. (cols. 477–499) "were formerly inverted by mistake of the binder, and the numbering of the cols, was perverted accordingly." |
| 500 | 217 | Leabhar Ollamhan, including the Auraicept na n-Éces 'Poets' Primer', a treatise on Ogam, etc. (ff. 18 ^{1/2}), written in 1408. Irish notes written by scribe at the bottom of several pages. |
| 549 | 241b–251b | Immacallam in dá Thuarad 'The Colloquy of the Two Sages'. |
| 570–2 | (252) | Catechism, beginning with the maxims of St. Fursa; cf: col. 228. |
| 573–958 | | Probably part of the Yellow Book of Lecan |
| 573–619 | 17 | Táin Bó Cúailnge |
| 620 | 41 | Account of Ailill's and Medb's heroes |
| 644 | 53 | Táin Bó Dartada 'The Raid of the Cattle of Dartaid' |
| 646 | | Táin Bó Regamon |
| 648 | | Táin bó Regamna |
| 649 | | Táin bó Fráich |
| 658 | 60 | Táin bó Aingen = Echtrae Nerai |
| 662 | 62 | Account of the Patriarchs (Old Testament) |
| 680 | 71 | Amra Coluimcille 'Songs of Columcille', written by Dallan Forgaill |
| 690 | 74 a 31 | Longes Labrada 'The Exile of Labraid ('Lorc' Loingsech)' |
| 700 | 81 | Homily In Teanga Bithnua 'The New Tongue' |
| 705 | 81 | Continuation of In Teanga Bithnua (four columns) |
| 707 | 86 | Immram Snedhghusa acus mec Riaghla "The Voyage of Snedgusa and Mac Ríagla", also Eachtrae clerech Choluimcille 'The adventures of Columcille's clerics'. Cf: the different version at col. 391. |
| 716 | 91 | Togail Bruidne Da Derga 'The Destruction of Da Derga's Hostel' |
| between 731 and 732 | | In O'Donovan's time, four paper leaves now transferred to the end of the book. One leaf tells of Brian Boru. |
| 740 | 105 | Suidiugud Tellaich Temra 'The Settling of the Manor of Tara' |
| 749 (line 20) | 109 | Longes mac n-Uislenn 'The Exile of the Sons of Uisliu' |
| 754 | 112 | Orgain Denna Ríg 'The Destruction of Dind Ríg' |
| 756 (line 47) | 113 | Esnada Tige Buchet 'The Songs of Buchet's House' |
| 759 (line 5) | 105 | Fled Bricrenn ocus Loinges mac nDuíl Dermait 'Bricriu's Feast, and the Exile of the sons of Dóel Dermait' |
| 765 s.f. | 117 | Tochmarc Becfhola 'The Wooing of Becfhola' |
| 768 (line 36) | 119 | Fianṡruth, List B |
| 770b (line 24) | 120 | How Enoch and Elijah were taken up into Heaven |
| 772 (line 40) | 121 | Stories about King David of Israel |
| 776 (line 47) | 123 | Aided Con Roí 'The Violent Death of Cú Roí'. On the deaths of Cú Roí mac Dáire and Blathnát. |
| 780 (line 27) | 125 | Poem (78 ranns) by Flanacan son of Cellach, king of Bregia |
| 781 (line 43) | 125 | Clesa Conculaind 'The Feats of Cú Chulainn' |
| 782 (line 126) | 126 | Assembly of Druim Cet |
| 783 (line 44) | 126b | Aided Néill Nóigíallaig maic Echdach Muigmedoin 'The Death of Niall of the Nine Hostages' |
| 785 (line 21) | 127 | Elegy on the death of Niall of the Nine Hostages (15 ranns) |
| 786 | 128 | Gein Branduib maic Echach ocus Aedáin maic Gabráin 'The Birth of Brandub son of Eochu and of Aedán son of Gabrán' |
| 786 (line 46) | 128a–132b | Scéla Cano meic Gartnáin 'The Story of Cano son of Gartnán' |
| 795 | 132 | Part of Cath Cairn Chonaill 'The Battle of Carnn Conaill' |
| 795 (line 21) | 133 | Story about St. Colman mac Duach and King Guaire |
| 797 (line 12) | 133 | Story about King Guaire, Mac Dá Cherda and Cuimín Fota. |
| 798 s.f. | 134 | Story about Mac Dá Cherda son of Mael Ochtrach |
| 800 (line 34) | 135 | 'Why Mongán was Deprived of Noble Issue', story about Mongán, Eochaid the chief poet of Ireland, and Fiachnae mac Báetáin, king of Ulster. |
| 802 | 136 | Stories about Mac Dé (and Diarmait mac Cerbaill) |
| 803 (line 22) | 136 | The Conversion of Constantine and the Finding of the Cross |
| 805 (line 13) | 137 | On the first satire composed in Ireland by Cairbre for Bres mac Eladan |
| 806 (line 7) | 138 | On King Salemon of Greece |
| 807 (line 8) | 138 | On the beheading of the John the Baptist and poem on the four Herods by the poet Bran |
| 808 (line 9) | 139 | Tréide Cétna Labratar iarna Genemain? On the three persons in Ireland who spoke directly after birth. |
| 810 (line 40) | 140 | Description of the Banqueting Hall at Tara, cf: col. 244. |
| 811 (line 23) | 140 | Poem on the sons of King Cormac mac Airt; short notes on St Patrick |
| 812–823 | 141 | Passion of the Lord |
| 823 | | Gospel of Nicodemus |
| 839 (line 19) | 154 | Homily of the Blessed Virgin |
| 852–857 | 161–163 | 'Dialogue of the Soul and Body' |
| 857 fin. | 163 | Word from the scribe, Giolla Íosa Mór Mac Fhirbhisigh in 1380. |
| 858 | 164 | Short story about St. Columcille and Aidan son of Gabrán |
| 858 (line 23) | 164 | 'Precepts of Gregory of Rome' |
| 860 | 165 | Life of Gregory |
| 863 (line 38) | 166 | Tegasc Rig Solmain meic David 'Instructions of King Solomon son of David' |
| 869 (line 9) | 169 | Homily on Michael the Archangel |
| 869b | 169 | Poem (15 ranns) and description of the 17 wonders on the night of Christ's birth; memorandum by a later Mac Firbis. |
| 869c–d, 870–875 | 171 | Aided Díarmata meic Cerbaill 'The Death of Diarmait mac Cerbaill' in prose and verse (Note: For further information, see Wiley, Dan M., The Cycles of the Kings) |
| 875 (line 28) | 174 | On the migration of the Ciarraighe into Connaught |
| 876 (line 6) | 175 | Tochmarc Étaíne 'The Wooing of Étain' |
| 877 (line 28) | 175 | Fotha Catha Cnucha 'The Cause of the Battle of Cnucha' |
| 878 (line 47) | 176 | Abbot Hugh on a legend about the Dagda and others of the Tuatha Dé Danann |
| 880 | 177 | Tochmarc Lúaine 7 Aided Athairne 'The Wooing of Lúan and the Death of Athairne' |
| 885 (line 26) | 179b–180a | Compert Conchobair 'The Conception/Birth of Conchobor' |
| 886 (line 48) | 180 | Geneamuin Chormaic Ua Chuind 'The Birth of Cormac mac Airt' |
| 889 (line 26) | 181 | Echtra Cormaic i Tír Tairngire 'Cormac mac Airt's Journey to the Land of Promise' |
| 898 (line 10) – 906 | 186 | Aided Chrimthainn meic Fhidaig 7 Trí Mac Echach Muigmedóin 'The Death of Crimthann son of Fidach and of Eochaid Muigmedóin's three sons' |
| 902 (line 41) | 188 | Echtra mac n-Echach Muigmedóin 'The Adventures of the Sons of Eochaid Mugmedon' |
| 906 (line 9) | 190 | Imtechta Moga Ruith 'The Adventures of Mog Ruith' |
| 907 | 190 | The Four Jewels of the Tuatha Dé Danann. On the Tuatha Dé Danann and their magical education, with a poem on the same. |
| 907 | | Scribe Giolla Íosa Mór Mac Fhirbhisigh |
| 908 | 191 | Baile Findachta, Ríg Connacht. Poem on the baile (prophecy, revelation) of Fínnachta, king of Connaught. |
| 909 (line 12) | 191b–192b | Suidigud Tellaig na Cruachna 'The Settling of the Manor of Cruachan', also known as Aided Nath Í 'The Violent Death of Nath Í'. |
| 910 (line 4) | 192 | Poem ascribed to Torna Éces, on pre-Christian kings of Ireland buried on Croghan; on burial places in Teltown |
| 911 s.f. | 192 | Compert Mongáin 'The Birth of Mongán' |
| 912 | | 'A story from which it is inferred that Mongán was Finn mac Cumaill' and Aided Fhothaid Airgdig 'The Violent Death of Fothad Airgdech'. Cf: col. 953–4. |
| 913 (line 42) | 193 | Scél Mongáin 'Stories of Mongán' |
| 914 (line 24) | 194 | Tucait Baile Mongáin 'The occasion of Mongán's frenzy' |
| 914 (line 49) | | Echtrae Chonnlai 'The adventure of Connla'. Cf: cols. 399–400. |
| 916 | 195 | Story about Mac Liag, chief poet of Brian Boru |
| 917 s.f. | 195 | Story about the poet Flann mac Lonáin |
| 919 (line 31) | 196 | Poem |
| 920 | 197 | On the seven orders of 'bards' |
| 938 (line 11) | 205 | Aided [Lugdach] Meic Con 'The Death of [Lugaid] Mac Con' |
| 939 (line 8) | 206 | Cath Almaine 'The Battle of Allen' |
| 942 (line 8) | 207 | Cath (Belaig) Duine Bolc 'The Battle of Dunbolg' |
| 945 s.f. | 209 | Cath Maige Rath 'The Battle of Mag Rath' (cf: the longer version at col. 321–332) |
| 949 (line 40) | 211 | Ces Noínden Ulad 'The Debility of the Ulstermen' |
| 951 (line 8) | 212 | Bruiden Átha Í (early story of the Finn Cycle) |
| 951 (line 34) | 212 | 'How Fiachna mac Baedáin Obtained the Kingdom of Scotland' |
| 952 | | Tucait Fagbála in Fesa do Finn 7 Marbad Cuil Duib 'How Finn obtained knowledge, and the slaying of Cul Dub' |
| 953 (line 38) | 213 | 'A story from which it is inferred that Mongán was Finn mac Cumaill' and Aided Fhothaid Airgdig 'The Violent Death of Fothad Airgdech'. Cf: col. 912. |
| 955 | 214 | Aided Óenfir Aífe 'The Death of Aífe's only son (=Connla)' |
| 957 (line 12) | 214 | Cáin Domnaig 'The Law of Sunday', cf: col. 217. |
