= Fear Bisigh mac Domhnaill Óig =

Irish ancestor

Fear Bisigh mac Domhnaill Óig, eponymous ancestor of Clann Mac Fir Bhisigh of Connacht, fl. 11th century.

Ó Muraíle believes Fear Bisigh to have been born sometime in the second half of the 11th century.

The forename Fear Bisish is very rare:"biseach means increase, growth or improvement and there are several derived senses" (according to Fr. Paul Walsh), while Fr. Patrick Woulfe's interpretation is "man of prosperity." Ó Muraíle suggests that "(a) ... the name many denote 'man of a leap-year', and (b) that Fear Bisigh may be similar in meaning to fear breise, 'extra man', perhaps denoting a son born long after the next youngest (male) child."

Dubhaltach Mac Fhirbhisigh gives his ancestor's pedigree as Fear Bisigh (a quo Clann Fhir Bhisigh) mac Domhnall Óg mac Domhnall Mór mac Aonghus mac Lochlainn Lough Conn mac Eoin mac Conchabhar na Conairte', and recorded somewhat dubiously as a descendant of Nath Í mac Fiachrach. His descendants would include:

- Amhlaoibh Mór mac Fir Bhisigh, poet, cleric and historian, died 1138.
- Giolla Íosa Mór Mac Fhirbhisigh, historian, fl. 1390−1418
- Dubhaltach Mac Fhirbhisigh, historian, died 1671.

== See also ==
- Uí Fiachrach Muaidhe
- O'Dowd
