= Fianshruth =

The title Fianṡruth (Find) refers to two alphabetically arranged Middle Irish lists of names associated with the Finn Cycle, preserved only in the Yellow Book of Lecan and probably datable to the twelfth century. The lists A and B are preceded by almost identical introductions. Many of the approximately 170 names do not occur elsewhere in the attested sources, while a number of familiar faces from later tales in the Finn Cycle, such as Fergus finnbél, are missing.

== Manuscript sources ==
- List A: YBL (p. 119a ff), headed “It e annso anmann muntire Find .i. fiandsroth fian Find u(i) Baiscne”
- List B: YBL (p. 325a), headed “Fianruth Fiand inso”

== Title ==
The title fian-ṡruth literally means ‘fian-stream’, which one may render as ‘fían-lore’. As observed by Stern, the word recurs in the Metrical Dindshenchas of Carmun as one of the literary genres to be recited at the Fair of Carmun:

Is iat a ada olla […] Fian-shruth Find, fáth cen dochta, togla, tána, tochmorca, slisnige, is dúle feda, áera, rúne romera. [etc.]	These are the Fair's great privileges: […] Tales of Find and the Fianna, a matter inexhaustible, sacks, forays, wooings, tablets, and books of lore, satires, keen riddles [etc.]

== Introduction from List B ==
Except in facsimile, the actual name-lists have not yet seen publication. Ludwig Stern's edition and German translation of the introduction are as follows (deviations in List A are indicated where necessary):

Iar ngabail rigi nErend do Cormac hua Cuind 7 iar nindarpa Lugaid Meiccon 7 iar ndith Fergusa Dub-detaig ... roboi cain Cormaic for Erind co 'adbal 7 co dirímh, gur ba lan in Eire dia cheithernaib. Is e ropa thaiseach teglaig 7 ropa cheand deorad 7 amhus 7 cech ceithirne archena la Cormac Find mac Cumaill, conad friusin atberat in daescar-sluag Fianna Find .i. rigfeindig, ised (is iat?) robatar fri laim Find forrusin. Erroi nonbair cech fir dib 7 cerd mancliuine ut fuit la Coinculaind. Is e didiu Find ropa taisech foraib la cech rig airsuidhiu cin romair 7 Oiséne ina diaid; ar ni rabatar ceitherna rig Temrach ni bá deach ina occusin. It e v na fiannasa fichset (fichsetar A) cath Cuillenn (Chuili Cuilleann A) 7 cath Cliach 7 cath Comair-tri-nusci 7 cath Muigi Inis 7 cath slebi Mis 7 cath Luacra (slebe Luachrai A) 7 cath sidhe Feimin 7 cath Fea 7 cath Crinna 7 cath Sidhe-da-bolg. Ocus it e rofichsetar (dofichetar A) iarsuidiu Indsi Derglocha (derglacha A) a sidhib la Find hua Baiscne for Ruadhraidh mac Boidb 7 ri. (et for Dercthiu A). Nach rig (ri A) tra las andeachadar na fiannusa i cath no an irgail riam is rompu nomuidheadh (is riam romeabaid for firu hErind A).

Nachdem Cormac der Enkel Conns König von Irland geworden, Lugaid Maccon vertrieben und Fergus Schwarzzahn gestorben war, lag die Steuer Cormacs auf Irland, gross und unermesslich, und Irland war voll von seinen Truppen. Da war Find MacCumaill Stammeshäuptling und das Haupt der Auswandrer und Söldner und zugleich jeder Truppe bei Cormac. Diese nannte das gemeine Volk die Fianna Finns, d. h. die Fiannenhäuptlinge, die neben Finn über sie gesetzt waren. Die Last von neun Mann auf jeden Mann von ihnen und die Regel des Dienstes waren wie bei Cuchulinn. Und Finn war also hernach unter jedem Könige Häuptling über sie, so lange er lebte, und Oiséne nach ihm; denn die Truppen des Königs von Tara waren nirgends besser als bei ihnen. Die Fianna aber kämpften die Schlacht von Cuile Cuilleann, von Cliu (?), von Comar-tri-nusci, von Mag Inis, von Sliab Mis, von Sliab Luachra, von Sid Feimin, von Fea, von Crinna und von Sid-dá-bolg. Und sie kämpten darnach (die Schlacht) von Inis-derglocha, dem Síd-Orte, nämlich Finn hua Baiscne gegen Ruadhraidh den Sohn Bodbs, etc.) Gegen welchen König immer die Fianna in die Schlacht oder in den Streit zogen, der wurde von ihnen besiegt.

== Sources ==
- Atkinson, Robert. Yellow Book of Lecan. Dublin, 1896. Facsimile edition, pp. 119, 325.
- Gwynn, Edward (ed. and tr.). The Metrical Dindshenchas. Vol. 3. Dublin: DIAS, 1906. Available online from CELT.
- Meyer, Kuno (intro, ed. and tr.). Fíanaigecht, being a Collection of Hitherto Unedited Irish Poems and Tales Relating to Finn and his Fiana, with an English Translation. Todd Lecture Series 16. Dublin: Dublin Institute for Advanced Studies, 1910.
- Stern, Ludwig Christian. “Fiannshruth.” Zeitschrift für celtische Philologie 1 (1897): 471–3.
