= Tecosca Cormaic =

Old Irish text

Tecosca Cormaic "The Instructions of Cormac" is a ninth-century Old Irish gnomic text which is cast as a dialogue between the legendary High-King of Ireland, Cormac mac Airt, and his son Coirpre Lifechair.

== Manuscripts ==
- H 2.18 or Book of Leinster, pp. 343–5 (TCD).
- 23 P 12 or Book of Ballymote (), ff. 39-41 (RIA)
- H 2.17, pp. 179–180 (TCD)
- 23 N 10 (Betham 145), pp. 1–6 (RIA)
- 23 N 17, pp. 1–6 (RIA)
- H 4.8 (TCD)
- Advocates Library VII.3., ff. 9a-9b (Edinburgh). Written by Ádhamh Ó Cuirnín
- 23 N 27 (Academy 14.4.), pp. 32- (RIA)
- H. 1.15., pp. 149- (TCD)
- H. 3.9., pp. 59- (TCD)
- 23 O 20 (Academy 1.4.), pp. ? (RIA)
- 23 D 2 (Miscell.), pp. ? (RIA)

== Editions ==
- Meyer, Kuno (ed. and tr.). Tecosca Cormaic. The Instructions of King Cormaic Mac Airt. RIA. Todd Lecture Series 15. Dublin: 1909.
