= Cambrai Homily =

The Cambrai Homily is the earliest known Irish homily, dating to the 7th or early 8th century, and housed in the Médiathèque d'agglomération de Cambrai. It is evidence that a written vernacular encouraged by the Church had already been established alongside Latin by the 7th century in Ireland. The homily is also the oldest single example of an extended prose passage in Old Irish. The text is incomplete, and Latin and Irish are mixed. Quotations from the Bible and patristic sources are in Latin, with the explication in Irish. It is a significant document for the study of Celtic linguistics and for understanding sermons as they might have existed in the 7th-century Irish church. The homily also contains the earliest examples in written Irish of triads, a form of expression characteristic of early Irish literature, though the text taken as a whole is not composed in triads.

The homily expounds on Matthew 16:24 with a selection from the Homilia in Evangelia by Pope Gregory I, and an explanation of the three degrees of martyrdom, designated by the colors red, glas ('pale'), and white.

== Linguistic significance ==
The Cambrai Homily is one of the few surviving written sources for Old Irish in the period 700 to 900. As such, it was an important source for Rudolf Thurneysen's classic grammar of Old Irish. It exhibits some distinctive orthographical features; for instance, a long vowel is sometimes indicated in the manuscript not with a diacritical mark, but by doubling or writing out the vowel twice. However, it was clearly transcribed by someone who did not know any Irish and it contains, in Thurneysen's words, "every misreading which the Irish script could suggest". The edition published in Thesaurus Palaeohibernicus (vol. II, pp. 244 ff.) contains both the text as it appears in the manuscript and a restoration of what the editors believe to be the correct text.

== Penitence and suffering ==
The passage from Matthew is addressed by Jesus to his disciples, calling upon each of them to follow his example and "take up his cross." The homily takes an inclusive view of penitence as combining self-mortification with compassion for others:

We carry the cross of Christ in two ways, both when we mortify the body through fasting, and when out of compassion for him we regard the needs of our neighbour as our own. A person who has compassion for the needs of his neighbour truly carries the cross in his heart.

Christ is to be regarded as a model not only of meaningful suffering, but of relations to others: "everyone's sickness was sickness to him, offence to anyone was offence to him, everyone's infirmity was infirmity to him."

== The colors of martyrdom ==
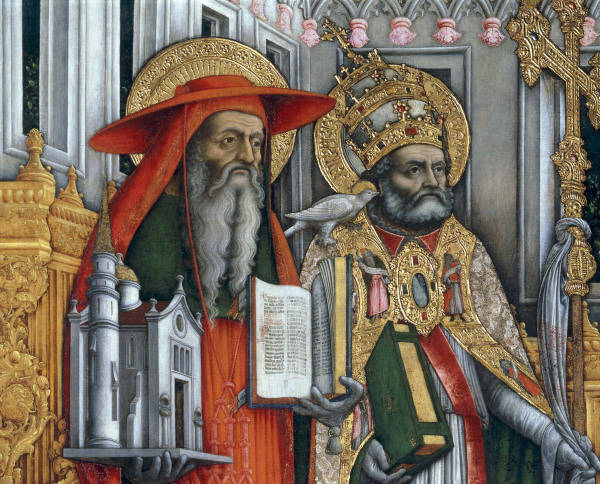
Jerome and Gregory, whose views of martyrdom influenced the Cambrai Homily, in a 15th-century depiction

The homily outlines three degrees of martyrdom, designated by color. This triad is unique, but draws on earlier distinctions between "red" and "white" martyrdom. Red martyrdom, or violent death as a result of religious persecution, was rarely obtainable after the establishment of Christian hegemony in the Roman Empire. Blood martyrdom was not a regular feature of early Christian life in Ireland, despite narratives that depict conflict between missionaries and traditional religious authorities such as the druids. Irish saints had to forgo the bloody "crown of martyrdom" until the Viking invasions at the end of the 8th century.

St. Jerome had used the term "white martyrdom" for those such as desert hermits who aspired to the condition of martyrdom through strict asceticism. The Cambrai homilist elaborates also on a distinction made by Gregory between inward and outward martyrdom. White martyrdom (bánmartre), he says, is separation from all that one loves, perhaps on a peregrinatio pro Christo or "pilgrimage on behalf of Christ" that might be extended permanently; blue (or green) martyrdom (glasmartre) involves the denial of desires, as through fasting and penitent labors, without necessarily implying a journey or complete withdrawal from life; red martyrdom (dercmartre) requires torture or death. The Irish color word glas for the third way of martyrdom can be translated as a light shade of blue, green or grey. Its symbolism in regard to martyrdom has been explained variously but not definitively. Glas has a figurative meaning of "fresh, raw, sharp" (in regard to weather) and "harsh" (morally); it also applies to complexion ("wan") or the discoloration of a corpse as "bluish, livid." The Irish treatise De arreis prescribes "fearsome penances" such as spending the night immersed in water or on nettles or nutshells or in the presence of a corpse. In one 12th-century Irish poem, the speaker Suibne Geilt, a dweller in the wilderness, says "My feet are wounded; my cheek is glas." In a much-referenced analysis of the Irish colors of martyrdom, Clare Stancliffe presented comparative textual evidence to suggest that glas martyrdom was so called because its austerity produced a sickly pale complexion.

One of the primary means of achieving glas martyrdom is fasting, a common penance which gained special significance from the practice of fasting as codified in early Irish law. A person with an unanswered claim against a social superior might threaten or enact a hunger strike (trocsad) against him, taking up a position outside his residence and potentially polluting his house and family with the responsibility of the faster's death. Irish saints fasted not only to mortify the flesh, but to coerce secular authorities and even to convince God himself. According to the Betha Adamnáin and some Irish annals, for instance, St. Adomnán fasted and immersed himself every night in the River Boyne as a protest against the kingship of Írgalach mac Conaing. D.A. Binchy has argued that the trocsad, a term that came into use also for hagiography, had a distinctively Irish character, leading perhaps to the use of the Celtic color word.

The Irish triad appears with a Latin fragment at the end of the Cambrai text: castitas in iuventute, continentia in habundantia. This fragment corresponds to a triad in the Prebiarum de multorum exemplaribus, a didactic florilegium of 93 questions. The Prebiarum supplies the missing third element as largitas in paupertate: "What are the types of martyrdom other than death? That is, three. Self-control in abundance, generosity in poverty, chastity in youth." Later examples of similar triads also exist.

== Alternative interpretations ==
The identification of the text as a fragment of a homily has been criticized by Milton Gatch, who maintains that early Christian Ireland lacked a homiletic movement aimed at sharing the teachings of the Church Fathers in the vernacular. Gatch holds that Irish canonical and penitential literature shows scant interest in preaching, and that homilies represent "a peculiarly English effort to assemble useful cycles of preaching materials in the native tongue." The so-called Cambrai Homily, he says, lacks the opening and close that is characteristic of the genre, and was probably just a short tract or excerpt for a florilegium.

== The text ==
The Cambrai Homily appears in a manuscript of the Bibliothèque Municipale (Cambrai, MS. 679, formerly 619, fos. 37rb–38rb). The manuscript was copied in the period 763–790 by a Carolingian scribe working in northern France for Alberic, bishop of Cambrai and Arras. The language of the homily itself, however, dates it to the late 7th century or the beginning of the 8th. It was inserted into the text of the Collectio Canonum Hibernensis, apparently from a stray leaf that had been slipped into the Latin exemplar. The scribe's knowledge of the Irish language appears to have been limited or nonexistent. An edition was published in 1903 by Whitley Stokes and John Strachan, with some aspects now considered outdated.

- Thesaurus Palaeohibernicus: A Collection of Old-Irish Glosses Scholia Prose and Verse. Edited by Whitley Stokes and John Strachan. Cambridge University Press, 1903, vol. 2, pp. 244–247. Full text downloadable.

== Selected bibliography ==
- A New History of Ireland: Prehistoric and Early Ireland. Edited by Dáibhí Ó Cróinín. Oxford University Press, 2005, vol. 1. Limited preview online.
- Follett, Westley. Céli Dé in Ireland: Monastic Writing and Identity in the Early Middle Ages. Boydell Press, 2006. Limited preview online.
- Stancliffe, Clare. "Red, white and blue martyrdom." In Ireland in Early Mediaeval Europe. Studies in Memory of Kathleen Hughes. Cambridge University Press, 1982.
