= Prebiarum de multorum exemplaribus =

The Prebiarum de multorum exemplaribus is a Hiberno-Latin interrogatory florilegium of the mid-8th century, written as a dialogue in a series of 93 short questions and answers. The word prebiarum seems to be a corruption of breviarium, though the work is not a breviary in the usual sense; the title is not customarily translated into English, but would mean something like "A Breviary of Examples from Many Sources". The Latin dialogue makes use of triads, a tripartite form of expression characteristic of early Irish literature. Its subject matter is exegetical or didactic; that is, it seeks to explain or teach, often through an enumeration of its points.

The Prebiarum is mostly of comparative interest, and has been dismissed as an example of texts, often written by monks, that "display a vulgarization of religious subjects, treating them as popular trivia, meant more for fun and humour than for any overly didactic, serious purpose". This characterization may represent an elitist view not evident to all readers of the Prebiarum. Like other catechetical Hiberno-Latin writings, the Prebiarum with its modest aims seems intended to help ordinary people with Bible study.

The text's 20th-century editor regarded the Prebiarum as "a handbook useful to the itinerant preacher, the teacher, or even to the spiritual father charged with the obligation of giving spiritual conferences or instructions. … In no sense is the work sophisticated; it is rather simple, direct, even somewhat archaic in spirit.".

== Sources, analogues, and intellectual context ==
Despite its 8th-century date, the Prebiarum is disconnected from the intellectual and theological preoccupations of the Carolingian Renaissance and represents a more "primitive state of biblical learning". Its methods cannot be said to derive from the exegetical literature of 7th-century Ireland, nor from the Northumbrian tradition of Bede.

As a collection of miscellaneous snippets from various sources (collectanea), the Prebiarum draws on patristic sources such as Jerome, Augustine and Gregory, as well as medieval writings of obscure origin. The Prebiarum is similar to the Joca monachorum ("Monks' jests") and Collectanaea pseudo-Bedae (sometimes noted as Collectanaea Bedae). The author or compiler of the Prebiarum drew on at least three works by Isidore of Seville, the Etymologiae, De ecclesiasticis officiis and the Sententiae, along with the Irish pseudepigraphical Liber de numeris.

Other parallels can be found in works of Irish provenance or character, such as Pseudo-Cyprian's De XII Abusiuis Saeculi, the Irish Pseudo-Bede's De XIII Diuisionibus Temporum, the Cambrai Homily and Pseudo-Isidore's Questiones tam de nouo quam de uetere testamentum.

Linguistically, the text is influenced by Merovingian and Vulgar Latin. The Prebiarum is addressed to an Adalfeus (Adalfeo spiritali), who might tenuously be identified as the Adelphus (d. 670) who was the third abbot of Remiremont. The Adalfeo of the text might also be a mistaken transliteration of Greek Ἀδελφῷ (from adelphos, "brother"), and the phrase mean "for a spiritual brother."

== Triads ==
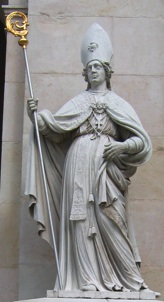
The Prebiarum most likely originated within the circle of St. Virgilius in Salzburg

The Prebiarum provides an enumerative response to many of the questions it poses, often in the form of a triadic utterance, including triads on greed (cupiditas) and martyrdom. One pair of triads is of a type circulated in other florilegia of moral extracts:

What are the worst things in this world? There are three. The soul of a sinner after death, the demons coming into his path, and not getting well rid of them for eternity.

What are the best things in this world? There are three. The soul of a just man after its departure from the body, and angels coming into his path, and to possess the eternal kingdom without end.

== The text ==
The Prebiarum exists in a single manuscript that was most likely transcribed in the scriptorium of Bishop Arbeo of Freising. It thus originated in southeast Germany around Salzburg, probably within the circle of St. Virgilius, which had a strong Irish presence. It is bound with five other minor works, four of which are of Irish provenance. Orthography and linguistic aspects date the work to the mid-8th century. Given this setting, it may be Arbeo who is addressed in the dedication as a "spiritual brother".

== Selected bibliography ==
- McNally, Robert E. Scriptores Hiberniae Minores Pars I. Corpus Christianorum 108B. Turnhout, 1973. Abbreviated SHM in this article.
