= Cuimre na nGenealach =

Cuimre na nGenealach ("binding of the genealogies") is an abridgment of Dubhaltach Mac Fhirbhisigh's Leabhar na nGenealach, written at his home in Lecan in Tír Fhíacrach Múaidhe, County Sligo in the spring and summer of 1666.

The book covers the genealogy of the House of Stuart, and the kings of Scotland from 1034 to 1666.

== Origins and background ==
The original manuscript was lost sometime after 1706, but it survives in two, apparently incomplete, 18th century transcripts, now RIA MS 25 N2, by an unknown scribe, and Maynooth Irish MS B 8, by Henry MacCarrick, a merchant of Sligo town.

Mac Fhirbhisigh's lengthy introduction specifies the contents, author, time and place:

"Cuimre Cráobhsgaoileadh cineadh ó Adhamh gus anois, 1666, tionóiltear a leabhraibh Cloinne Fhirbhisigh (is go hairidhe as an leabhar do sgriobhsam fén go foirleanthan are cráobhsgaoileadh mór – agus mion-bhabhal Ereann in gach am) egarthas agus sgriobhthar sonna lesin Dubhaltach mc Giolla Íosa Mhóir mc an and Dubhaltach Mec Fhirbisigh Lecain Mhec Firbhisigh i tTír Fhiachrach Muaidhe, anno Christi 1666: anius and dara lá is an cédlúan do mhís Aibreóil [le toil nDé) trosaigheam so isin Tír Fhiachrach remebeartha/An Abridgement of the genealogical ramifications of the peoples of Ireland and the Scots of Alba together with their principal genealogical branches from Adam until now, 1666, which is assembled from the books of Clann Bhirbhisigh (and especially from the book I wrote myself at length on the ramification of the great and minor branches of Ireland at every time) and is arranged and written here by An Dubhaltach son of Giolla Íosa Mhóir son of An Dubhaltach Mec Fhirbisigh of Lecain Mhec Firbhisigh in Tír Fhiachrach of the Muaidhe in the year of Christ 1666; today, the second day and first Monday of the month of April, we begin this (by God's will) in the year and Tireragh aforesaid.

== Contents ==
Having written Leabhar na nGenealach, Mac Fhirbhisigh took on the task of making a smaller concise version of the text. The Cuimre contains about 30% of LGen.'s material, fully a third of which (25,000 words) is taken verbatim from LGen. Of the rest (42,000 words), about half is an abridged or rewritten version of LGen., the remaining contents are new, sometimes entirely unique. The new material comes from a variety of sources, mostly unknown, and not found anywhere else.

While there are differences, the Cuimre in general reflects the layout of LGen. However, the Naoimhsheanchas, the copy of Holinshed's governors, deputies and lieutenants of Ireland, along with almost all of the poems, are absent. It may be that Mac Fhirbhisigh intended to add them later.

Seachas Síl Ír however has been both abridged and rearranged. New material includes:

- a short piece on the Cruithnigh (Picts)
- a very detailed history of the Stuart kings of Scotland and Britain from 1034 to 1666
- detailed genealogies on over twenty-five branches of the Nugents and Daltons

== Innovations ==
An innovative feature of the Cuimre is the manner in which many pedigrees are recast. O Muraile writes (on page 267 of The Celebrated Antiquary):

"In a development which is quite unique to this work – not being found, at least in such a systematically developed form, in any other Irish genealogical collection – ... the more important genealogies are set out in the reverse of the usual order of son: father: grandfather, and so on; instead they begin with a more or less distant ancestor and progress from father to son to grandson and so on down – in many cases – to a figure more or less contempoarty with Dubhaltach."

Examples include Ruaidhrí Ó Flaithbheartaigh, Martán Ó Conchobhair Sligigh, Brian Ó Ruairc (d. 1641), and Mac Fhirbhisigh himself. It may indeed have been that he intended to recast the entire collection, but realising the scale of the task, contented himself with an abridgment.

Other works cited include:

- Faccuculus Temporum by Werner Rolevinck
- A Restitution of Decayed Intelligence by Richard Verstegan/Richard Rowlands

== Preparation and progress ==
"Even to produce a work such as the Cuimre ... must have taken a great deal of planning and preparation. We can at least be quite certain that Dubhaltach must have been far from idle during all those years in the 1650s and early 1660s when he is lost from our view.(p.269, Ó Muraile, 1996)"

Dubhaltach's rate of progress can be gauged by a colophon dated Saturday, 5 May 1666 – at a point where he had written some 45% of the Cuimre since he began on 2 April. This is highly suggestive of a work of transcription; thus Dubhaltach must have had compiled and prepared the text by the time he began, and would have reached the end of what is now the end of both surviving manuscripts by June or July.

Ó Muraile feels that Dubhaltach did not actually finish the work, thus what survives may indeed be much, or all or, what he originally wrote.

== Return to Dublin ==
At some point later in the year Dubhaltach returned to Dublin, where he translated annalistic material for Sir James Ware. He was working at Sir James's house on Castle Street, Dublin, on Tuesday 6 November 1666. On Saturday 1 December 1666 Sir James died, five days after his seventy-second birthday, bringing their collaboration, and Dubhaltach's employment in Dublin, to an end.
