= Council of Irish Genealogical Organisations =

The Council of Irish Genealogical Organisations (CIGO) is a representative group which lobbies for better and greater access to source material for those involved in the study of Irish genealogy. It was founded in Dublin in 1992.

== History ==
The Council of Irish Genealogical Organisations CIGO was established in 1992 in response to the Irish Government's announcement that the General Register Office (GRO) was to be decentralised to Roscommon town, Co Roscommon. Initially, the body was known as the GRO Users Groups (GROUSERS) but soon adopted the name CIGO. In its early years, difficulties arose relating to policy decisions and clarity of purpose, but by 2011 it had grown to represent almost all of Ireland's voluntary genealogical bodies. These are the: Association of Professional Genealogists in Ireland, Ballinteer Family History Society, Blessington Family History Society, Certificate Genealogists' Alumni Group, Clare Roots Society, Cork Genealogical Society, East Clare Heritage, Irish Family History Society, Irish Genealogical Research Society, Irish Huguenot Society, North of Ireland Family History Society, Raheny Heritage Society, Western Family History Association, Wicklow County Genealogical Society. In addition it has a number of associate 'overseas' members from the UK, USA, Canada, Australia and New Zealand.

== Aims ==
1. To provide a forum for family history and genealogical groups and societies which share an interest in Irish research.
2. To encourage, foster and promote greater public knowledge of and access to records relevant to genealogists, whether held by Civil, Ecclesiastical, or private bodies.
3. To formulate, influence and co-ordinate policy on all issues of concern to member organisations.
4. To encourage membership of CIGO by both Irish and overseas genealogical and family history organisations.

== Work ==
Since CIGO was established it has lobbied for change on numerous issues. Its work to improve civil registration practices in Ireland brought about the first change in data recorded in death registrations since civil registration of deaths first began in Ireland in 1864. Through its lobbying, led by Executive Liaison Officer (South) Steven Smyrl, since December 2005 Irish death registrations now note each deceased person's date and place of birth and both parents' names. After its two Executive Liaison officers (Steven Smyrl (South) and Robert Davison (North)) appeared before the Northern Ireland Assembly's Finance & Personnel Scrutiny Committee in early 2009 the General Register Office for Northern Ireland (GRONI) accepted the committee's findings (noted in its report) that similar changes should be adopted in Northern Ireland death registrations. Subsequently, the changes came into force on Monday, 17 December 2012.

Since its inception CIGO has campaigned for the early release of the Irish 1926 census returns. Through its work CIGO was successful in getting provision for general release of census records in Ireland after only 70 years included in an early amendment during the Bill stages of the Statistics Act 1993. However, this was later increased to an embargo of 100 years before the Act was passed. In 2011, with a change of government in Ireland, the new Minister for Arts, Heritage and the Gaeltacht, Jimmy Deenihan, recognised CIGO's call to open the 1926 census and went on to promote the value such a move would have to genealogy and roots tourism. However, the move eventually became embroiled in interdepartmental “civil service trench warfare” and the campaign stalled, though not without first having brought the issue to public awareness.

Through use of the UK's Freedom of Information Act, in 2010 CIGO was able to secure public access to England & Wales' wartime National Register. A quasi-census, the National Register lists by address every person residing in England & Wales on the night of 29 September 1939, along with their date of birth. Following this, in 2009 the NHSIC opened a service providing information from the National Register on payment of a fee. This had a domino effect and very shortly after access was provided to the National Register in both Scotland and in Northern Ireland.

== Membership ==
Full membership of CIGO is open to all Family History Societies (and similar organisations) based on the island of Ireland and Associate membership is open to all similar groups based outside Ireland.
