= Giolla Íosa Mac Fir Bisigh =

Gilla Isa Mac Fir Bisigh (died 1301) was an Irish historian, poet, mathematician and astronomer.

Sub anno 1301, the Annals of Connacht record the death of Gilla Isa Mac Fir Bisig, ollam of the Ui Fiachrach Muaide, a master of history and tales and poetry, of the Computus and of many other arts.

His family, the clan Mac Fhirbhisigh, were at the time resident in what is now County Mayo. His father was Gilla Isa Mor Mac Fir Bisigh. Other notable members of his family were

- Amhlaoibh mac Fir Bhisigh, fl. c. 1200.
- Domhnall na Sgoile Mac Fir Bhisigh, fl.c. 1250.
- Giolla Íosa Mór Mac Fhirbhisigh fl. 1390–1418.
- Dubhaltach MacFhirbhisigh, died 1671.
