= Giolla Íosa Mór Mac Fir Bhisigh =

Gilla Íosa Mor mac Donnchadh MacFhirbhisigh (fl. 1390 – 1418) was a historian, scribe and poet of the learned Clan MacFhirbhisigh based at Lackan in Tír Fhíacrach, now part of County Sligo. He was the chief compiler of the Yellow Book of Lecan and the Great Book of Lecan, both of which are valuable literary and historical texts.

== Sources ==
- The Celebrated Antiquary, Nollaig Ó Muraíle, Maynooth, 1996.
- Irish Leaders and Learning Through the Ages, Paul Walsh (priest), 2004. (ed. Nollaig Ó Muraíle).
