= Psalter of Caimín =

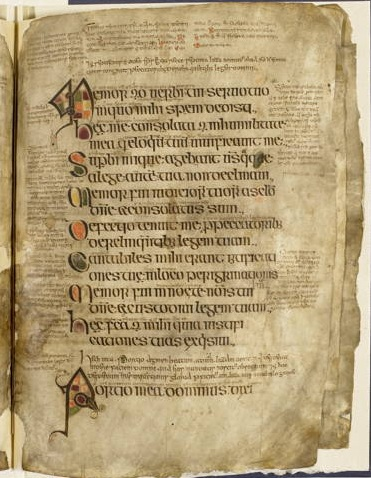
Folio, with main psalm text and border annotations

The Psalter of Caimín is a medieval Irish illuminated manuscript likely produced in the 11th century, possibly on the island of Inis Cealtra in Lough Derg. It is badly damaged, with only fragments surviving. These consist of six folios, containing verses 1-16 and 33-116 of Psalm 118 (Beati Inmaculati...), a psalm that would have had 176 versus in total, and was a favourite of the early Irish church. It is possible that the Psalter only ever consisted of this full psalm, perhaps also with notes and commentary, although it may have been much larger, containing the entire Psalter. It kept in the library of University College Dublin (MS.A.i)

The main text recounts the Gallican Psalter, and is set in a single narrow column in the middle of each folio, and written in large half-uncial minuscule case. The margins are thus wide, and contain extensive glosses in both Irish and Latin; it is, along with the Southampton Psalter, one of only two surviving manuscripts to contain annotation in both of these languages.

Saint Caimín died in 654, but the book is generally believed to have been produced much later. Based on the style of Irish and the decorations found in the glosses, an approximation of the late 11th century is generally accepted, although it was believed to be a genuine relic of Saint Caimín for a short period. Little is known of its origins or early provenance. It is first mentioned in 1639 by Archbishop James Ussher, when it was described as "among the books of the Convent of Franciscans at Donnegall". It was taken to St Isidore's in Rome during the French Revolution, returning to Ireland in 1872.
