= Amhlaoibh Mór mac Fir Bhisigh =

Amhlaoibh Mór mac Fir Bhisigh (died 1138) was an Irish poet, cleric and historian.

== Biography ==
The Annals of Tigernach, sub anno, give his obituary:

1138. Amlaim Mor mac Firbisigh, ollam O Fiachrach uile re senchus & re filidhecht, & sái clerigh co m-bethaigthib ecailsi imda, & togha do Cunga, & a ec and iar m-buaidh ongtha & aithrige.

Nollaig Ó Muraíle (1996, p. 2) writes that "The terms used in the obit ... are interesting: he is described as 'ollam of all Ui Fhiachrach in senchus and filigheacht, as a wise cleric holding many livings and, finally, as 'the choice of [the monastic community of] Cong.' This combination of professions of historian and poet with a clerical post of some eminence may have significance to the thorny question of the origin of the hereditary learned families of late medieval Gaelic Ireland. Apart from Amlaoimh, however ... we have little evidence of an ecclesiastical dimension to Clann Fhir Bhisigh or its antecedents before its rise to prominence in the field of traditional learning."

His collateral descendant Dubhaltach Mac Fhirbhisigh (died 1671) recorded that he had brothers Giolla Pádraig mac Fir Bhisigh, ancestor of the Clann Fhir Bhisigh and of Dubhaltach Mac Fhirbhisigh, and possibly Lachtna, who is given as the ancestor of the Ó Lachtna / Loftus / Loughney family in Connacht.

The abbey at Cong had been refounded by King Tairrdelbach of Connacht (1088–1156) sometime about 1130, having become an episcopal see at the Synod of Ráth Breasail in 1111. Its canons were of the Augustinian order. It was attacked and burned in 1114, 1135 and 1137.

== See also ==
- Uí Fiachrach Muaidhe
- O'Dowd
- Tir Fhiacrach
