= Kilglass =

Townland in County Sligo, Ireland

Kilglass Cill Ghlas
- Townland
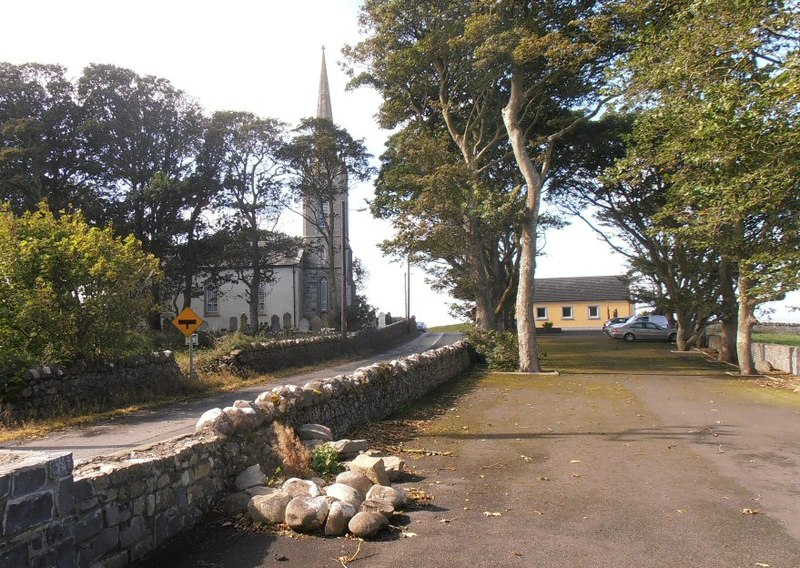
- Kilglass Church of Ireland

- Location in Ireland
- Coordinates: 54°14′21″N 9°03′22″W
- Country: Ireland
- Province: Connacht
- County: County Sligo
- Elevation: 15 m (49 ft)
- Time zone: UTC+0 (WET)
  - Summer (DST): UTC-1 (IST (WEST))
- Irish Grid Reference: G311327

Kilglass or Kilglas (Irish: Cill Ghlas, meaning 'green church') is a rural townland in County Sligo, Ireland, in the hinterland of Enniscrone. Kilglass is in a civil parish of the same name.

The area is the location of an Anglican church, built in 1829 with funding provided by the Board of First Fruits, and renovated in 1996. The parish is in the Church of Ireland Diocese of Tuam, Killala and Achonry. The nearby MacFerbis Centre serves as a community centre and it is used for social and cultural functions. The building is named after the local Mac Fhirbhisigh clan, who were bardic chroniclers of medieval Ireland and were associated with the nearby townland of Lacken.

Kilglass also has a Catholic church — the Church of the Holy Family — and a Roman Catholic primary school, Kilglass National School. Kilglass and Enniscrone are incorporated in one Roman Catholic parish.

== Name ==
Although Cill Ghlas is the official Irish-language version of the name Kilglass today, it is believed that the most likely derivation is that it is a corruption of Cill Molaise (St Molash's church).

== Transport ==
Kilglass is served by Bus Éireann route 458 (Sligo-Enniscrone-Ballina).

== See also ==
- List of towns and villages in Ireland
