= Leabhar Cloinne Maoil Ruanaidh =

Irish book

Leabhar Cloinne Maoil Ruanaidh, or the Book of Mac Dermot, is the title given by Nollaig Ó Muraíle to "a collection of genealogies sometimes referred to as 'The Book of Mac Dermot' ..." which now forms the fourth and most significant part - 'd' - of RIA MS 539 [D i 3].

== Outline ==
A colophon on folio 43r reads A mBaile Mec Aodagain aniu Damhsa, Phillip Ua Duiginain. At the bottom of folio 78v is the following note: Ni bfuaras nisa mho do sheanchas Eirionn acht a mheid do sgriobhamar bhar ndiagh. Leor so an uair-si an seachmadh la do Dhecember, 1644. Mathgamhain O Duibhgeannain.

With this and other evidence - the date 1642 occurs on an earlier page - O Muralies thinks it was written at the Mac Aodagain law-school at Ballymacegan, County Tipperary, before the end of 1644. It also contains additions and corrections by Dubhaltach Mac Fhirbhisigh, especially the O Dubhda genealogies. It is, however, a Clan Ó Duibhgeannáin production.

== See also ==
- Leabhar na nGenealach
- Ó Cléirigh Book of Genealogies
- An Leabhar Muimhneach
