= Ó Cléirigh Book of Genealogies =

The O'Clery Book of Genealogies, also known as Royal Irish Academy Ms. 23 D 17, was written by Cú Choigcríche Ó Cléirigh, one of the Four Masters, who was transported in the 1650s to Ballyacroy, County Mayo, "under the guidance of Rory O'Donnell, son of Col. Manus O'Donnell, slain at Benburb, 1646."

Upon his death in 1664, he willed his books and manuscripts to his sons, Diarmaid and Sean. In 1817, John or Sean O'Cleary (one of six sons of Patrick, son of Cosnahach (1693–1759), son of Cairbre, son of Diarmaid, son of Cú Choigcríche), moved to Dublin. He brought with him manuscripts of Leabhar Gabhala, the O'Clery Book of Genealogies, the Life of Hugh Roe O'Donnell and the [topographical] poems of Seán Mór Ó Dubhagáin (died 1372) and Giolla na Naomh Ó hUidhrín (d. 1420), all written by Cú Choigcríche.

Briefly in the possession of Patrick Lynch (d.1817) and the bookseller Patrick Vincent FitzPatrick of Capel Street, they were acquired by the writer Edward O'Reilly (died August 1830). They were purchased by the Royal Irish Academy in November 1829, and remain in their possession. It was edited by Seamus Pender and published in 1951.

David Sellar, who was the Lord Lyon King of Arms in Scotland, concluded that it dates from the mid 17th century.

== See also ==
- Foras Feasa ar Éirinn
- Annals of the Four Masters
- Leabhar na nGenealach
- Leabhar Cloinne Maoil Ruanaidh
- Great Book of Lecan
- An Leabhar Muimhneach
- Senchus fer n-Alban
