= Leabhar na nGenealach =

Irish genealogical manuscript

Leabhar na nGenealach ("Book of Genealogies") is a massive genealogical collection written mainly in the years 1649 to 1650, at the college-house of St. Nicholas' Collegiate Church, Galway, by Dubhaltach MacFhirbhisigh. He continued to add material until at least 1666, five years before he was murdered in 1671. The original 17th-century manuscript was bequeathed to University College Dublin (UCD), by Dublin solicitor Arthur Cox in 1929, and can be consulted in UCD Library Special Collections. The manuscript can be viewed online at Irish Script on Screen, which is available in English, and in Irish. Leabhar na nGenealach, was reprinted, and published in a five volume edition in Dublin in 2004 as The Great Book of Irish Genealogies.

The book contains notes on families from all parts of Ireland, from Gaelic Scotland, as well as the pre-Gaelic, Viking and Old English peoples of Ireland. It consists of eight hundred and seventy one pages, 95% of which is in Mac Fhirbhisigh's handwriting. The remainder is in the hand of an unknown amanuensis, and incorporates some pages written in 1636 by Mícheál Ó Cléirigh. While MacFhirbhisigh worked on commission from the Poor Clares in Galway and may have earned income as a tutor, he appears to have had neither patron nor sponsorship of any sort while working on this book. It was seemingly a labour of love for the writer.

== Description and compilation ==
Described by Eoin MacNeill "by far the largest and fullest body of Irish genealogical lore", it contains roughly twice as much material as found in the Book of Ballymote and the Book of Lecan. It preserves notes on families from all parts of Ireland, Gaelic Scotland, the pre-Gaelic, Viking and Old English peoples of Ireland. It features an eighteen-page preface, nine 'books' or divisions and a seventy-four-page Clar or general index in double columns. It consists of eight hundred and seventy one pages, 95% of which is in Mac Fhirbhisigh's handwriting. The remainder is in the hand of an unknown amanuensis, and incorporates some pages written in 1636 by Mícheál Ó Cléirigh.

Many questions concern Leabhar na nGenealach. In the words of Nollaig Ó Muraíle:

" ... who or what prompted Mac Fhirbhisigh to undertake the compilation of Leabhar na nGenealach? ... how much planning and organisation (such as the collection of source material) preceded the writing of the book ..? Did he, at any time during the compilation ... entertain hopes of seeing it printed ...? Unfortunately, we have very little in which to base even the most tentative of answers to these questions. We simply do not know ..."

Nor is it known how he supported himself in Galway, though he did commissions for the Poor Clares and John Lynch while there. O Muraile suggests that it was a work compiled in his spare time, in between possible tutorial work for the children of local families (see The Tribes of Galway). Unlike the Four Masters, he appears to have had neither patron nor sponsorship of any sort.

As to the question of why he wrote Leabhar na nGenealach, Mac Fhirbhisigh himself stated it was his intention to "... do mhórughadh glóire Dé agus do ghéunamh iúil do chách i ccoithchinne / to increase the glory of God and to give knowledge to everyone generally". Thus it appears to have been a labour of love, and as a strong defence of traditional Gaelic learning, though not uncritically so. That it seems to be a book written for all the peoples of Ireland is indicated by the following:

"Na slioinnte, iomorra, da suarraighe atáid, ní fuigfeam dar ndeóin éanghloinneadh aca gan a aireamh ó a cheap fén / of the surnames, moreover, however undistinguished they may be, we do not willingly leave a single one of them without reckoning it from its own stock".

David Sellar, who was the Lord Lyon King of Arms in Scotland, stated that it dates from 1585 to 1670.

== Contents ==
=== Díonbhrollach (preface) ===
This preface states it was ... compiled by Dubhaltach Mac Fhiribhisigh of Lecán, 1650.

The díonbhrollach describes the contents of the book, including:

- An extended title on the contents, place and time of writing, author and purpose of composition.
- A defence of senchas, the truthfulness and validity of the tradition.
- Critical remarks on the supposed descent of all the Irish from Míl Espáine
- Mac Fhirbhisigh's law, which states:
  It is customary for great lords that, when their families and kindreds multiply, their clients and their followers are oppressed, injured and wasted. [translation by Thomas Charles Edwards in Early Irish & Welsh Kinship, p. 221]
- How Leabhar na nGenealach deals with all race and all peoples of Ireland – free and unfree tribes, Fir Bolg, Gaels and all subsequent invaders.
- A note on dialect.
- An apology by Mac Fhirbhisigh for any deficiencies of this first draft ...Till God give us another time more tranquil than this to re-write it.

=== Rémhrádh (introduction) ===
Begins with the following introduction: "Senchus genealach gabháltas uasal Éreann agus Albansgot go ccraobhsgaoileadh a ccineadhach ó créudthós na n-aimsior n-aicsidhe gus aniú (mar ghebh mid / The history of the genealogies of the invasions of the nobles of Ireland and of the Scots of Alba with the genealogical branchings of their races from the beginning of visible times until today, as we find, according to the order". Mac Fhirbhisigh draws upon a recension of Lebor Gabála Érenn (The Book of the Taking of Ireland) by Mícheál Ó Cléirigh for a summary which deals with the legendary invaders of Ireland from the time of Partholón to Míl Espáine. Following this, Mac Fhirbhisigh begins the book proper, with the genealogies of Síol Éreamhóin (Érimón).

=== Leabhar I to IV ===
This is the first division or 'book' of Leabhar na nGenealach. Titled "Craobhsgaoileadh Cloinne Partholón" (the propagation of the family of Partholón) it describes the ancestry and descendants of Partholón, who was the leader of the second group of people to settle in Ireland. It covers pages 27 to 30 in the autograph of the work. The following divisions cover all the invaders of Ireland up to the Milesians.

=== Leabhar V ===
Book five comprises some three hundred and fifty pages of the autograph, representing just under half of the total text. It concerns the following groups and dynasties, and their many sub-divisions: Cenél nEógain and Cenél Conaill (Northern Uí Néill); Clann Cholmáin and Síl nÁedo Sláine (Southern Uí Néill); Uí Briúin and Uí Fiachrach (Connachta); Airgíalla (including the Uí Maine, the Déisi and the Dál Riata); the Laigin.

While much of Book Five's information is derived from the Book of Lecan or the Book of Ballymote, Mac Fhirbhisigh added material not found in either of these sources; indeed, much of it is entirely unique to Leabhar na nGenealach. In a small number of cases – Ó Néill and Mac Suibhne – this is due to Mac Fhirbhisigh updating pedigrees to his own lifetime. In the UF tract this applies to the later generations of the Clan MacFhirbhisigh, their pedigree appearing in no later manuscript. The Leabhar Oirghiallach is in many instances very obviously drawn from versions of the Books of Lecan and Ballymote, yet once again there is unique material concerning Clann MacDonnell, a gallowglass family. They derive from a leabhar teagloim, and a Leabhar Balbh Shémus Mec Fhirbhisigh, neither of which now survives. The latter, The Dumb Book of Séamus Mac Fhirbhisigh was written by Mac Fhirbhisigh's great-grandfather, Séamus mac Diarmada Chaoich.

Other sources for the remaining subjects include: Senchus fer n-Alban; the Book of Uí Maine, from sections now missing; Amhra Colm Cille; Opus chronologicum by Ubbo Emmius; versions of De Shíl Chonairi Móir, De Maccaib Conaire, the Duan Albanach; the poem 'Saor do leannán, a Leamhain' by Muireadhach Albanach Ó Dálaigh (fl. 'c'. 1200). Leabhar Laighin is in part derived from the books of Lecan and Ballymote, and the Book of Glendalough (a.k.a. Book of Leinster). However, once again, entirely unique material found in no other surviving manuscript is preserved here by Mac Fhirbhisigh. The only source explicitly named – though he refers vaguely to other books – is once called Leabhar Buidhe Lecan Mec Fhirbhisigh, now lost.

=== Leabhar VI ===
This book outlines the history and genealogical ramifications of the descendants of Íor son of Míl Espáine, known as the Síol Ír. The material was derived from Leabhar Uí Dubhagáin (a.k.a. Leabhar Ua Maine). This section is followed by a shorter one treating of the Dál nAraidi and the descendants of Fergus mac Róich. It ends with a version of Clann Ollamhan Uaisle Eamhna, similar to, though not exactly, the one found in Leabhar Ua Maine.

Mac Fhirbhisigh added "a great amount of additional material ... both in the margins and interlineally ... those inserted between the lines are variant readings, some of them of considerable interest, deriving as they do from quite a different recension of the work; ... represented by just one manuscript older than LGen, namely RIA B iv2."

=== Leabhar VII ===
Book seven deals with the descendants of Ebhar mac Milidh, written or begun in 1649, comprising pages 599 to 689 (eight-five pages are blank). As Mac Fhirbhisigh intended to merely summarise material, he did not reproduce the original texts, which were extracts from Saltair Chaisil, written in Latin.

Pages 640.5 to 645.5 feature the descendants of Brian Bóruma, such as the O'Briens, including the Anglo-Irish Plunkett family. This was a fabrication, based on the Plunkett's status in the late 16th century, claiming them as descended from King Donnchad mac Briain, who died in Rome in 1064. As did Geoffrey Keating, Mac Fhirbhisgh reserves doubts on this, though pointing out that it should not be discounted merely because of Donnchad's age, as "there is no period in a man's life in which he may not beget." The families of Eustace, Bennett and Power, along with others, are given the same ancestor.

Further sections concern the descendants of Cian mac Ailill Aulom, which were at least partly assembled in the early 8th century. The final section is at least in part derived from the Book of Ui Maine.

=== Leabhar VIII ===
Titled Naoimhsheanchas, this book concerns the genealogies of the Irish saints. "This now extends from p. 692 to p. 753, but it contains various layers of material inserted at different times and from quite a variety of sources. They include the Book of Leinster, the Book of Ui Maine, Leabhar Breac, and Cú Choigcríche Ó Cléirigh's recension of Naoimhsheanchas Naomh Inse Fáil. Mac Fhirbhisigh thought well enough of Ó Cléirigh's additions to incorporate them into LGen. While most of the text was written at that period [i.e., c.1650], it is clear from variations in the ink and handwriting that Dubhaltach made numerous later additions to the work. The most notable of these appear to date from 1653, and other insertions may have been made in 1657 and 1664."

The Naoimhsheanchas is set out in much the same manner as Leabhar na nGenealach itself; "... the layout of the saints genealogies (on pp. 697–739) exactly parallels the sequence of the secular genealogies of the Gaoidhil (or Gaelic people) in LGen."

Rém Ríogharaidhe Éreann, a catalogue of the Kings of Ireland to 1198, concludes the book. Mac Fhirbhisigh's main source is very likely to be RIA MS C iii3 or volume c of the autograph section of the Annals of the Four Masters – which he refers to as Leabhar Airison Fhearghaill Uí Ghadhra, Fearghal Ó Gadhra being a patron of the annals – covering the years AM 2242 to AD 1171. Mac Fhirbhisigh notes that the text was completed "...i cColáisde na Gaillmhe dhia Céadaoin vii. Augusti. anno MDCXLIX / in the college of Galway, 8 August 1649." Given that Galway was within days of plague, famine and siege, O Muraile expressed the wish "for the merest hint by Mac Fhirbhisigh of what conditions were like in the stricken city while he was penning his list of Irish kings!"

=== Leabhar IX and the Clár ===
Covering pages 768 to 852, it consists of eleven distinct sections, almost all on invaders (Vikings, Normans, Welsh, etc. ..). Pages 853–932 comprise the Clár, or index of the secular genealogies, while pages 926–932, Clár Naomh nÉireann, is an index concerning Irish saints. It finishes with a dedication and note by Mac Fhirbhisigh: Ad maiorem Dei gloriam, DF do theagair agus rus graif for Iuil, 1653 / To the greater glory of God. D[ubhaltach Mac] F[hirbhisigh] arranged and wrote it during July (?) 1653. This is followed by three poems from pages 935 to 957: 'Triallam timcheall na Fodla'; Tuilleadh feasa ar Eirinn oig'; 'Foras focal luaightheal libh'

=== Cuimre na nGenealach ===
The Cuimre is an abridgement of Leabhar na nGenealach. The original is now lost, but it survives in two apparently incomplete 18th century transcripts; RIA MS 24 N2, and Maynooth Irish MS B 8. While containing about 30% of the material of Leabhar na nGenealach, it also contains much new, and some unique material. Mac Fhirbhisigh began it on Monday 1 April 1666, at his home at Castletown, Co. Sligo. By Saturday 5 May, he had completed some 45% of the surviving material, and would appear to have finished prior to returning to Dublin and working for Sir James Ware.

Mac Fhirbhisigh was stabbed to death by Thomas Crofton in a shebeen at Doonflin, Co. Sligo, in January 1671.

== Modern edition ==
Leabhar na nGenealach was edited and published in 2004 as The Great Book of Irish Genealogies. The editor, Nollaig Ó Muraíle, had been studying the book since 1971. It was published in five volumes by De Burca Books in 2004 in Dublin.

== See also ==
- Genealach Chloinne Fheorais
- Leabhar Cloinne Maoil Ruanaidh
- Leabhar Ua Maine
- MS 1467
- Lost Annals of Lecan
- Ó Cléirigh Book of Genealogies
