= Dindsenchas =

Class of onomastic text in early Irish literature

Dindsenchas or Dindshenchas (modern spellings: Dinnseanchas or Dinnsheanchas or Dınnṡeanċas), meaning "lore of places" (the modern Irish word dinnseanchas means "topography"), is a class of onomastic text in early Irish literature, recounting the origins of place-names and traditions concerning events and characters associated with the places in question. Since many of the legends being related also concern the acts of mythic and legendary figures, the dindsenchas has been an important source for the study of Irish mythology.

== Works ==
The literary corpus of the dindsenchas comprises about 176 poems plus a number of prose commentaries and independent prose tales (the so-called "prose dindsenchas" is often distinguished from the "verse", "poetic" or "metrical dindsenchas"). As a compilation the dindsenchas has survived in two different recensions. The first recension is found in the Book of Leinster, a manuscript of the 12th century, with partial survivals in a number of other manuscript sources. The text shows signs of having been compiled from a number of provincial sources and the earliest poems date from at least the 11th century. The second recension survives more or less intact in thirteen different manuscripts, mostly dating from the 14th and 15th centuries. This recension contains a number of poems composed after the Book of Leinster text. Dindsenchas stories are also incorporated into saga texts such as Táin Bó Cúailnge and Acallam na Senórach.

Although they are known today from these written sources, the dindsenchas are clearly a product of oral literature and are structured so as to be a mnemonic aid as well as a form of entertainment. They are far from an accurate history of how places came to be named. Many of the explanations given are made to fit the name and not the other way around, especially in the many cases where a place was much older than the Middle Irish spoken at the time of the poems' composition. In other cases, the dindsenchas poets may have invented names for places when the name of a place, if it had one, was not known to them. A detailed analysis points to a pre-Christian origin for most of the tales. For example, many placenames appear which had fallen out of use by the 5th century A.D., when Irish written records began to appear in quantity. Furthermore County Clare is given as part of Connaught suggesting a date before ~610 AD and the Battle of Knocklong. Christian references, and the Graeco-Roman myths and tales of Pagan atrocity associated with that influence are also mostly absent.

Knowledge of the real or putative history of local places formed an important part of the education of the elite in ancient Ireland. This formed part of the training of the military, for whom a knowledge of the landscape was essential. It was also essential knowledge for the bardic caste, who were expected to recite poems answering questions on place name origins as part of their professional duties. An early example of this are the tales about Mongán mac Fíachnai which date from at least as early as 750, where the poet Forgoll is asked to recite the lore of different places. Consequently, the dindshenchas may well have grown by accretion from local texts compiled in schools as a way of teaching about places in their area.

Edward Gwynn compiled and translated dindsenchas poems from the Lebor na hUidre, the Book of Leinster, the Rennes Manuscript, the Book of Ballymote, the Great Book of Lecan and the Yellow Book of Lecan in The Metrical Dindshenchas, published in four parts between 1903 and 1924, with a general introduction and indices published as a fifth part in 1935.

== Texts and translations ==
- Gwynn, Edward (ed.), "The Metrical Dindshenchas", Royal Irish Academy Todd Lecture Series, Hodges, Figgis, & Co., Dublin; Williams and Norgate, London
  - The Metrical Dindshenchas Part 1, vol. VIII, The Academy., 1903, e-text at CELT : text and translation
  - The Metrical Dindshenchas Part 2, vol. IX, Dublin : Academy House, 1906, e-text at CELT : text and translation
  - The Metrical Dindshenchas Part 3, vol. X, Dublin, 1913, e-text at CELT : text and translation
  - The Metrical Dindshenchas Part 4, vol. XI, Dublin : Academy House, 1924, e-text at CELT : text and translation
  - The Metrical Dindshenchas Part 5, vol. XII, Dublin, 1935
  - Poems from the Dindshenchas, vol. VII, Dublin, 1900, by the same author in the same series
- Stokes, Whitley (ed.), "The Prose Tales from the Rennes Dindshenchas", Revue Celtique (in Irish and English)
  - [Tales 1-32], vol. 15, 1894, pp. 272–336, e-text via CELT : text and translation
  - [Tales 33-80], vol. 15, 1894, pp. 418–484, e-text via CELT : text and translation
  - [Tales 81-130], vol. 16, 1895, pp. 31–83, e-text via CELT : text and translation
  - [Tales 131-153] First Supplement, Extracts from the Book of Lecan, vol. 16, 1895, pp. 135–167, e-text via CELT : text and translation
  - [Tales 154-161] Second Supplement, Extracts from the Book of Leinster, vol. 16, 1895, pp. 269–312, including index, notes, and corrections.
- Stokes, Whitley, ed. (1892), "The Bodleian Dinnshenchas", Folk-Lore, III (4): 467–516, e-text : text and translation
- Stokes, Whitley, ed. (1893), "The Edinburgh Dinnshenchas", Folk-Lore, IV (4): 471–497, e-text : text and translation

== Other uses ==
There was also an Irish- and English-language journal Dinnseanchas, published by An Cumann Logainmeacha between 1964 and 1975 to a sixth volume, which focused on placename research and scholarship.
