= Ádhamh Cúisín =

Irish scribe and genealogist

Ádhamh Cúisín, Irish scribe and genealogist, fl. c. 1400.

== Life and career ==
Ádhamh Cúisín is the name of one of some ten scribes who compiled the Book of Uí Mháine.

His name seems to be of Norman origin, the Annals of the Four Masters noting that King Ruaidrí Ó Gadhra of Sliabh Lugha was killed in 1256 by "David, son of Richard Cuisin."

The Annals of Connacht under 1270 records that "The Earl and the Connacht Galls made great raids in Tirerrill on the people of Aed O Conchobair. David Cusin was killed on this raid."

David Cuisin or Cusin possessed a castle and land near Ballaghaderreen. Another bearer of the name was Tomás Cúisín, listed under 1462 in the Annals of Ulster as "the best master of law in his time in Armagh who had a great school in this year." It is unknown if either of the latter two were related to Ádhamh.

Ádhamh Cúisín has been noted by Ó Muraíle as "the most prolific of the scribes in the portion of the manuscript that still survives – his hand appears on 99 of the extant folios). The manuscript was known to contain 368 folios in the 15th and 16th centuries. Two hundred and fifty years later, Dubhaltach Mac Fhirbhisigh transcribed a seventy-page historical-genealogical compilation called Seanchas Síl Ír. His source can be shown to be the Book of Uí Mháine. Mac Fhirbhisigh's faithful transcript is especially valuable as four of the original fourteen folios have since been lost.

The book began to be written some time before 1392–1394, and some time after that date. It was written at the behest of Muircheartach Ó Cellaigh, who was Bishop of Clonfert (1378–1393) and Archbishop of Tuam till his death in 1407. Bishop Ó Cellaigh was a grandnephew of Uilliam Buidhe Ó Cellaigh, king of Uí Mháine from about 1349 to 1381.

The only other scribe of the book known by name is Faolán Mac an Ghabhann na Scéal, who died in 1423. Mac an Ghabhann's poem, Adham ar n-athair uile, was penned by Cúisín.
