= Paul Walsh (priest) =

Irish priest and historian

- Pól Breathnach
- Born: 19 May 1885; Mullingar, Ireland
- Died: 18 May 1941 (aged 55); Dublin, Ireland
- Occupations: Priest and historian

Academic background
- Education: CBS Mullingar, Westmeath; St. Finnian's College, Navan
- Alma mater: St. Patrick's College, Maynooth; All Hallows College

Academic work
- Discipline: History; Irish language; Welsh language
- Sub-discipline: Gaelic Ireland; Irish literature
- Institutions: St. Patrick's College, Maynooth

Paul Walsh (Irish: Pól Breathnach; 19 June 1885 – 18 June 1941) was an Irish priest and historian. He was the author of over twenty books and some three hundred articles. Much of his research focused on the editing, translation and analysis of Gaelic texts from the Middle Ages, Renaissance and early modern period.

== Early life and education ==
Walsh was the eldest of the five sons and three daughters born to Michael Walsh and Brigid Gallagher of Ballina (aka Balliea), in the parish of Mullingar, County Westmeath. Educated locally, he spent a year at Mullingar's Christian Brothers school, and subsequently in 1900 to St. Finnian's College, Navan, where he studied for three years. Noted as a good student, Walsh achieved special distinction in classics and mathematics. In autumn 1903 he became a student at St. Patrick's College, Maynooth, again achieving great distinction in subjects such as Irish, French, Italian and Philosophy.

Under the influence of Peter Yorke (1864–1925), Walsh became interested in many aspects of Irish culture. Tomás Ó Fiaich later commented that Walsh was one of "... a generation of students [at Maynooth] which was collectively able, multi-talented, committed and independent-minded", many of whom went on to achieve great distinction in many aspects of Irish life. However, his participation in a controversy concerning 'compulsory Irish' at the National University led to him been denied ordination at Maynooth; the ceremony instead took place at All Hallows College, Dublin, on 24 June 1909. He was also forbidden to return to pursue postgraduate studies.

== Career ==
Between 1910 and 1916 Walsh participated in a diverse range of activities; four months as a curate in Dunsany, County Meath, teaching at Ring summer school, County Waterford, and teaching Latin at St. Finnians. He continued with his studies, obtained a BA in Celtic Studies with first class honours in 1912, and in 1914 an M.A. with first class honours, both from the National University of Ireland. The outbreak of war in 1914 prevented travel to continental Europe for a travelling scholarship.

In April 1916 he was a minor participant in the run-up to the Easter Rising, when he became a member of the various groups sent by Eoin MacNeill to countermand Sunday 'manoeuvres, travelling as far as Athenry, County Galway. But upon his return to Dublin he learned that a small group of Irish Volunteers intended to proceed.

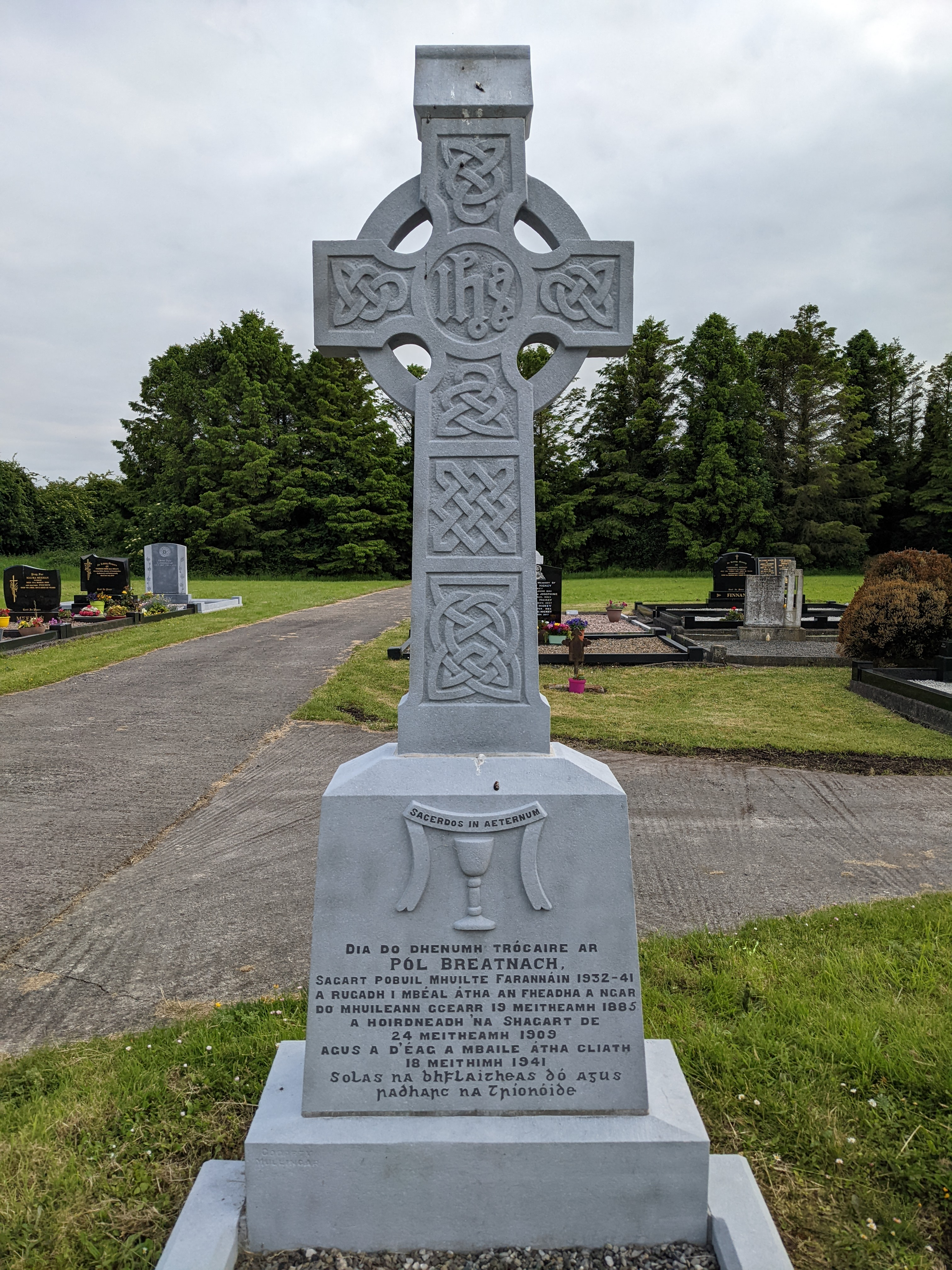
Grave of the Irish scholar Fr Paul Walsh (1885–1941) in Multyfarnham, Co. Westmeath

In autumn 1916 Walsh became the first Lecturer of Welsh in Maynooth; in June 1919 he became Professor of Ecclesiastical history there.

Due to his shy nature he was reputed to be a poor lecturer. In 1928 he was thus relieved to be appointed curate of Eglish, Birr, County Offaly. He was then transferred to Stamullen, County Meath, and lastly, to Multyfarnham, County Westmeath in June 1932, as parish priest, a position he held for the rest of his life. He was made a member of the Irish Manuscripts Commission in 1933; in 1940, he joined the board of the Dublin Institute for Advanced Studies.

== Death ==
His health declined precipitously in spring 1941. Following a brain haemorrhage, Walsh died at the Pembroke Nursing Home, Dublin, on 18 June 1941. He was interred in the hillside graveyard at Multyfarnham on 21 June 1941.

== His work as a scholar ==
It is principally as a man of learning that Paul Walsh will continue to be remembered, a conscientious, diligent scholar who produced important original research on many aspects of Irish history and Gaelic learning and wrote hundreds of articles deriving from that research. His writings are still a most useful resource to scholars in those fields and comparatively few of them have yet been entirely superseded. (#2)

Between 1907 and 1941 Walsh authored over twenty books and some three hundred articles. He was also responsible for editing and studying several important Irish texts, learned notes on Irish historical writers, along with extensive work on the history of Meath, Ulster, and Irish genealogy. He also wrote nearly sixty book reviews.

=== "The Placenames of Westmeath" ===
In 1915, Walsh produced part one of The Placenames of Westmeath, and abridged version of John O'Donovan's 1837 Ordnance Survey letters for the county. It was part of a projected comprehensive work, and though Walsh continually collected material on the subject it remained unfinished at his death. An expanded version was published in 1957 by the Dublin Institute for Advanced Studies which was heavily supplemented by Walsh's notes and annotations.

=== Gaelic Ulster ===
Paul Walsh's first work concerning Ulster was his edition of the diary of Tadhg Ó Cianáin, which was a journal of the Flight of the Earls. This edition was published in 1916. It was followed by Genealogie Regum et Sanctorum Hiberniae in 1918, a previously unpublished collection of genealogies of kings and saints by the Four Masters. Further such studies included The Will and Family of Hugh O'Neill (1919; published in book form in 1930); The Life of Aodh Ruadh Ó Domhnaill (1922); The Book of O'Donell's Daughter (1929); and Colonel Myles O'Reilly, Sheriff of County Cavan, 1641 (1935). 1920 saw the publication of Leabhar Chlainne Suibhne: An account of the Mac Sweeney Families in Ireland, with Pedigrees. The dedication was "I gcimhne mo mháthar Brighid Ní Ghallchobhair 1854–1917. Nollaig Ó Muraíle describes it as "an important, well thought-out book, a work which no-one working on Donegal history can afford to ignore" (#3). Unfinished at his death was his edition of Beatha Aodh Ruadh Ó Domhnaill by Lughaidh Ó Cléirigh. However, this led to a "series of meticulous and penetrating studies that were to shed a great deal of light on the story of Mícheál Ó Cléirigh and the Four Masters" (#4), all of which were published in the 1930s and are still invaluable.

=== The Irish Annals ===
From about 1939 Walsh concerned himself with the medieval Irish annals and annalistic dating. An especially valuable study, The Dating of the Irish Annals, was published shortly after his death. World War II brought an unexpected boon in the relocation of the first half of the Annals of the Four Masters from Dublin to Multyfarnham. These two autographs had been held at Stowe House and Rome until their return to Ireland in 1872, after which they had been kept at the Franciscan House at Merchant's Quay, Dublin. This meant that John O'Donovan's edition relied on two 18th-century copies and thus contained some defects. Paul Walsh availed of this opportunity and by the time of his own death had transcribed the years AD 428 through to 1170, totalling 650 pages.

After his death his library was purchased at the behest of his fellow Meath clergy, and donated to St. Finnian's College.

== Bibliography (incomplete) ==
- Abbreviations:
  - GIM - Gleanings from Irish Manuscripts (2nd edition, 1933);
  - IBL - Irish Book Lover;
  - CB - Catholic Bulletin;
  - ILL - Irish Leaders and Learning;
  - IMN - Irisleavhar Muighe Nudhat;
  - ZCP - Zeitschrift für celtische Philologie;
  - ITQ - Irish Theological Quarterly;
  - IER - Irish Eccleastical Record.

=== Articles ===
- A fragment used by Keating, in Archivm Hibernicum, I, p. 1–9, 1912.
- On a passage in Serglige Conculaind, in ZCP 8, p. 555-6. 1912
- The Topography of Beatha Colmain, in ZCP 8, p568-82. 1912.
- An elegy on Eamonn O Braonain, in IMN, p. 19–24, 1913.
- Elegy on Niall Garbh O Domhnaill, in IMN, p. 39–50, 1914.
- Placenames in Vita Finniani, in ZCP 10; 73–7. 1914
- A Poem by Aodh Mac Aingil, CB 6, p. 381-5. 1916
- Aodh Buidhe Mac Cruitin i bhFlonndrus, i An Claigheamh Soluis, 26 Feb/ 1916.
- An tAthair Eamonn O hOgain, CS, 15 December 1917.
- Description of O'Renehan MS 107, in IMN, 19–27, 1917
- Particulars of Clare Poets, in INM, 58–9, 1917
- The Will and Family of Hugh O Neill, in IER, 5/13; 27–41
- The Chieftains of Fermanagh, in IER, 5/15: p 353–64; 17: 571–84; 19: 1–14. 598–613. 1920
- The Irish language and the Reformation, in ITQ 15, 239–50. 1920
- Eisibeal Stibhin in An Reult I, p. 57–58. 1920.
- Marbh chaoine an Athar Sean Ui Mhaonaigh o Chill Rosanta, in An Sioladar, 1/1, 27–40.
- The Learned Family of O Duigenan, in IER 5/17, p. 225-35.
- The Life of Aodh Ruadh O Domhnaill (part), in AH 7, supplement 1–80, 1922
- Hugh Roe O Donnell's sisters, in IER 5/19: 358–64. 1922
- Sean O Mathghamhna's Irish MSS in IBL 18, p. 144. 1930.
- Meath in The Book of Rights, in Feilscribhinn Eoin Mhic Neill, p. 508–21, 1940.
- The Mac Iago Family, in Irish Press, 29 October 1940.
- The Ua Maelechlainn Kings of Meath, in IER 5/58; p. 165-83

=== Books ===
- Seanmoiri Muighe Nuadhad, II, 1907
- Seanmoiri Muighe Nuadhad, III, 1908
- The Placenames of Westmeath, 1915
- The Flight of the Earls, 1916
- Genealogiae Regum et Sanctorum Hiberniae, 1918
- Gleanings from Irish Manuscripts, (first edition), 1919
- Leabhar Chlainne Suibhne: An Account of the Mac Sweeney Families of Ireland, with Pedigrees, 1920.
- Leaves of History, part I, 1930
- The Will and Family of Hugh O Neill, 1930
- Saint Patrick A.D. 432–1932 (editor), 1932
- Gleanings from Irish Manuscripts, second edition, 1933
- Irish Men of Learning, 1947
- Beatha Aodh Ruadh Ui Dhomhnaill, part one, 1948
- Beatha Aodh Ruadh Ui Dhomhnaill, part two, 1957
- Irish Chiefs and Leaders, 1960
- Irish Leaders and Learning Through the Ages, ed. Nollaig Ó Muraíle, 2005

=== Unpublished work ===
- A transcript of the Annals of Inisfallen (unfinished). Forty pages.
- A transcript of the Four Masters annals from the Franciscan autograph, A.D. 42–1170. Six hundred and sixty pages.
- Catalogue of Irish manuscripts in the library of St. Patrick's College, Maynooth (mainly Murphy MSS 1–58)
- Norman genealogies from Royal Irish Academy 23 D 17. Sixty eight pages
- Essay on chronology of Irish annals. Sixty four pages.
- Parish annals of Duleek, County Meath. Twenty four pages.
- Parish annals of Doonore, County Meath. Eighteen pages.
- Historical notes on Meath parishes. Ten pages.
- The O Neill genealogies. One hundred pages.
- Christian Kings of Munster (unfinished). Seven pages.
- Historical notes on Irish bishops (unfinished). Eighteen pages.
- Notes on the history of the province of Connacht: A broadcast. Ten pages.
- Connach Mac William families (unfinished). Sixty pages.
- O Rourke's lordship (unfinished). Eighteen pages.
- An appreciated of the work for Welsh literature of J. Gwenogvryn Evans. Twelve pages

== Legacy ==
The NUI awarded him an honorary doctorate in 1941.

The Irish Conference of Medievalists hosts an annual ‘Paul Walsh Memorial Lecture’.
