= Lebor na Cert =

Book of Early Irish laws

Lebor na Cert, or the Book of Rights, is a book of Early Irish laws, from medieval Ireland. The text details the rents and taxes paid by the King of Cashel, to various others in Ireland. The Great Book of Lecan, and the Book of Ballymote contain copies.

The Lebor na gCeart or the Book of Rights is a 12th-century text that details customs and practices of Irish nobility in the Middle Ages. It outlines the rights of all the monarchs in Ireland at the time and the revenue due them.

Myles Dillon describes the text:

the book of rights purports to record the rights of the Irish Kings, the King of Ireland, the provincial kings and the stipends due from the King of Ireland to the provincial kings... as in the book of Invasions the record is put into verse so the text consists, for the most part, of a collection of poems.
