= Ádhamh Ó Cuirnín =

Ádhamh Ó Cuirnín was an Irish medieval scribe from a north Connacht bardic family. His place in history remains as that of the copier, in 1418, of Lebor Gabála Érenn [The Book of the Taking of Ireland], an important historic record of the land's folkloric history, compiled and edited by an anonymous scholar in the 11th century, and containing a loose collection of poems and prose narratives recounting the mythical origins and history of the Irish race from the creation of the world to the Middle Ages.
