= Great Book of Lecan =

Late-medieval Irish manuscript

Leabhar Mór Leacain
- Royal Irish Academy (302 leaves); Trinity College Library
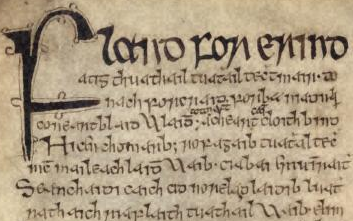
- Opening lines of Máel Mura Othna's poem "Flann for Érinn" ("Flann over Ireland"), from the Great Book of Lecan, 296v
- Also known as: Leabhar Lecain, Great Book of Lecan, Book of Lecan
- Type: Compilation of Irish legends
- Date: Between 1397 and 1418
- Place of origin: Clonmacnoise
- Language: Middle Irish
- Scribe(s): Giolla Íosa Mór Mac Fhirbhisigh, Ádhamh Ó Cuirnín
- Material: Vellum
- Size: 32cm x 22cm
- Format: Folio
- Condition: Pages covered in greasy material
- Script: Irish minuscule
- Contents: Legends, genealogy, history, hagiography

Location of Lecan (Leacán) in Ireland

The Great Book of Lecan or simply Book of Lecan (Irish: Leabhar (Mór) Leacáin) (RIA, Ms. 23 P 2) is a late-medieval Irish manuscript written between 1397 and 1418 in Castle Forbes, Lecan (Lackan, Leckan; Irish Leacán), in the territory of Tír Fhíacrach, near modern Enniscrone, County Sligo. It is in the possession of the Royal Irish Academy. Nollaig Ó Muraile dated it to c. 1397–1432 or possibly even a little later. Another estimate dated it to the early 15th century.

Leabhar Mór Leacáin is written in Middle Irish and was created by Ádhamh Ó Cuirnín, Murchadh Ó Cuindlis, and an anonymous third scribe for Giolla Íosa Mór Mac Fhirbhisigh. The material within was transcribed from the Book of Leinster, later copies of the Book of Invasions, the Dinsenchas, the Banshenchas, and the Book of Rights.

At one stage it was owned by James Ussher. After it was seized from Trinity College Dublin by troops under the command of Sir John Fitzgerald, 2nd Baronet, in 1689 during the Williamite War in Ireland, James II of England deposited it at the Irish College, Paris. In 1787, the Chevalier O'Reilly returned it to Ireland, where it was at one stage in the possession of Charles Vallancey, who passed it on to the Royal Irish Academy.

There were originally 30 folios; the first nine were apparently lost in 1724. These contained a large section devoted to the pedigrees and history of the Norse and Norse–Gaelic families of Ireland, which are nowhere else preserved.

The pages are covered in a greasy substance which makes them transparent and reduces their legibility.

== See also ==
- Uí Fiachrach
