= An Leabhar Muimhneach =

Irish genealogical manuscript

An Leabhar Muimhneach, also known as The Book of Munster, is an Irish genealogical manuscript.

An Leabhar Muimhneach is preserved in a number of 18th century manuscripts, the most complete being the work of the scribe Richard Tipper of Dublin, 1716–1717. Based on works compiled by Domhnall Ó Duinnín and Tadhg mac Dáire Mheic Bhruaideadha, in the early 17th century. A translation was made by Eugene O'Keeffe in 1703, and a complete scholarly edition by Tadhg Ó Donnchadha in 1940. This work is not to be confused with the c. 1400 Red Book of Munster (Leabhar Ruadh Muimhneach) by Murchadh Ó Cuindlis.

== Sources ==
- The Celebrated Antiquary, p. 156, Nollaig Ó Muraíle, Maynooth, 1996.
