= Tír Fhiacrach Muaidhe =

Territory in northwest Ireland (abolished 1603)

Tír Fhiacrach Muaidhe Uí Fhiacrach Muirisce
- Túath/Tríocha Céad
- History
  - Created: uncertain
  - Abolished: 1603
  - Succeeded by: Barony of Tireragh, County Sligo
- Status: Túath (Territory)
- Subdivisions
  - Type: Parishes/Townlands

Tireragh Moy (Irish: Tír Fhiacrach Múaidhe, meaning 'Country of the Uí Fhiacrach of the River Moy') is a territory in County Sligo in northwest Ireland. It is now represented by the barony of Tireragh.

It was the land of Fiachrae, son of Eochaid Mugmedon.

== History ==
Ua Dubhda (O'Dowd) were kings of Tír Fhiacrach. In 982 Aedh ua Dubhda (Aedh grandson of Dubhda), King of Uí Fiachrach Muaidhe, died "an untroubled death". He was the first of his dynasty to use the surname O Dubhda.

Tiobraide, chief of Uí Fiachrach in the time of St. Columcille, granted the land around the hill of Cnoc na Maili, now the Red Hill of Skreen, St Adomnan founded here the monastery of Skreen.

In 598 AD the battle of Aughris was fought between the Cinél Cairbre and the Cinél Fiacrach.

== List of Kings ==
- Aedh ua Dubhda
