= Book of Ballymote =

Irish manuscript, 1390/1391

- Royal Irish Academy, MS 23 P 12
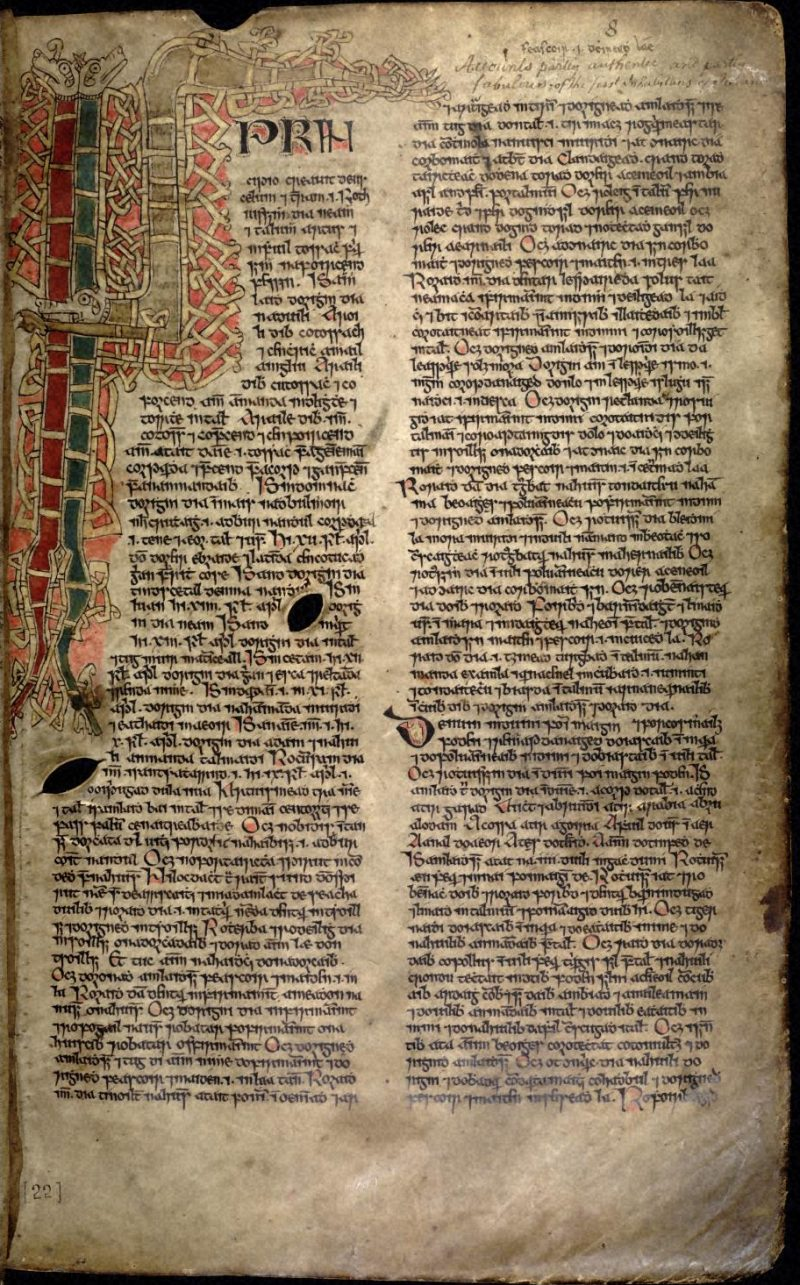
- Book of Ballymote, f. 8r
- Also known as: Leabhar Bhaile an Mhóta
- Type: Miscellany
- Date: 1390–1391
- Place of origin: Ballymote
- Language(s): Middle Irish, with some Latin
- Scribe(s): Solamh Ó Droma, Roibéard Mac Síthigh, Maghnus Ó Duibheannáin
- Patron: Tomaltagh McDonagh
- Material: Parchment
- Size: 40 × 26 cm
- Format: Folio
- Condition: Imperfect
- Script: Irish minuscule
- Contents: Genealogy, history, hagiography, topography
- Illumination(s): Interlace initials, mainly zoomorphic, tinted with coloured washes

Location of Ballymote in Ireland

The Book of Ballymote (Irish: Leabhar Bhaile an Mhóta, RIA MS 23 P 12, 275 foll.) was written in the late 14th century in or near the town of Ballymote, now in County Sligo, but then in the tuath of Corann.

According to David Sellar who was the Lord Lyon King of Arms in Scotland, the Book of Ballymote was written between 1384 and 1405. According to Robert Anthony Welch, it was compiled in the late 14th century.

== Production and history ==
This book was compiled towards the end of the 14th century at the castle of Ballymote for Tonnaltagh McDonagh, who was then in occupation of the castle. The chief compiler was Manus O'Duignan, one of a family who were ollavs and scribes to the McDonagh and the McDermots. Other scribes of the book were Solomon O'Droma, a member of a famous County Fermanagh family, and a Robert McSheedy. The book is a compilation of older works, mostly loose manuscripts and valuable documents handed down from antiquity that came into possession of McDonagh.

== Content ==
The first page of the work contains a drawing of Noah's Ark as conceived by the scribe. The first written page is missing and the second opens with a description of the ages of the world. Patrick and his household; Cormac's instructions to a king; and a physical and geological survey of Ireland. Part of the work is devoted to the sagas of Finn and Brian Boru, and the Lebor na Cert (Book of Rights). It also contains treatises on the metre and the profession of a poet, and on the Ogham writing and language. The book ends with several translations from Greek: the destruction of Troy and the wanderings of Ulysses, followed by a resume of Virgil's 'Aeneid', beginning with Nestor's speech to the Greeks.

== Location ==
The Book of Ballymote, like many of its kind, has made history by its wanderings. For over a hundred years it was a treasured possession of the McDonaghs of Corran. In 1522 it was purchased by the O'Donnells with whom it remained until the Flight of the Earls in 1603. From 1620 until 1767 it was in the library of Trinity College, Dublin. It disappeared from the library and was later found in Burgundy, France. In 1785 it was returned by the Chevalier O'Gorman to the Royal Irish Academy where it remained as one of the Academy's most treasured possessions. One of the ways the ownership of this book can be traced is through non-scribal notes in the margins of the text. The work was photographed by the Academy in 1887 and two hundred copies of it were made.

== Description ==
The first page of the work contains a drawing of Noah's Ark. The first written page is lost, and the second page describes the ages of the world.

- a life of Saint Patrick (6r)
- a copy of the Lebor Gabála Érenn (8r)
- Tecosca Cormaic "The Instructions of King Cormac" and other stories concerning king Cormac mac Airt
- Triads of Ireland
- stories of Fionn Mac Cumhail and Brian Bóruma
- various genealogies of clans and kings
  - Christian kings of Ulster (34v)
  - Christian kings of Leinster (35v)
  - Christian kings of Connaught (37v)
  - of the Munster families (97r)
  - Dál gCais (102v)
- rules of the different measures of Irish versification (157r)
- a copy of Auraicept na n-Éces, or "The Scholars' Primer" (169r)
- the Lebor na gCeart (Book of Rights) (181r)

The book ends with various Greek and Latin fragments on the fall of Troy, including a fragment of the Aeneid.

== Editions ==
- O'Duignan, Manus (1887) [Written from original manuscript that was written 1390-1391]. Atkinson, Robert (ed.). The Book of Ballymote. Dublin: Royal Irish Academy. ISBN 0-404-17535-X.
- O'Donovan, The Book of Rights, ed. and trans. 1847.
- The Book of Ballymote: Photographic facsimile with introduction by R. Atkinson, (Dublin 1887).
