= Nollaig Ó Muraíle =

Irish scholar

Nollaig Ó Muraíle is an Irish scholar. He published an edition of Dubhaltach Mac Fhirbhisigh's Leabhar na nGenealach in 2004. He was admitted to the Royal Irish Academy in 2009.

== Life and career ==
A native of Knock, County Mayo, Ó Muraíle attended National University of Ireland, Maynooth where he was a postgraduate student enrolled for a PhD. He was Placenames Officer with the Ordnance Survey of Ireland 1972–1993. He was Reader in Irish and Celtic Studies at Queen's University Belfast to 2004 and Senior Lecturer at the Department of Irish, National University of Ireland, Galway from 2005–2014. He is married to Tresa Ní Chianáin and has two children, Róisín and Pádraic. He lives in Dublin.

== Ó Muraíle and Mac Fhirbhisigh ==
In 1971, at the suggestion of Tomás Ó Fiaich, then Professor of Modern History at Maynooth, Ó Muraíle began work on Dubhaltach Mac Fhirbhisigh's Leabhar na nGenealach. This was continued under the direction of Professor of Old and Middle Irish Pádraig Ó Fiannachta.

Upon joining the Placenames Branch of the Ordnance Survey in late 1972, Ó Muraíle had already translated over one hundred pages, albeit from Eugene O'Curry's copy. Access to the autograph of Leabhar na nGenealach however remained difficult; only on 28 August 1979, at University College Dublin's new home of Belfield, was he able to begin transcription of the original, which he finished on 10 September 1981. It had taken a total of 88 sessions in UCD Special Collections Reading Room. Typing began in late 1982 and was complete by 4 September 1984. By early 1988, after much tedious work, the Cumire was also successfully in transcript. His PhD dissertation, submitted in September 1991 on the life, background and work of Mac Fhirbhisigh, was fully two volumes, totalling 1,086 pages.

Early in 1998, Ó Muraíle was approached by fellow Mayoman, Éamonn de Búrca, with an offer to publish his edition of Leabhar na nGenealach. De Burca insisted on a full translation of the text into English (with the original Irish text on the facing page) in opposition to Ó Muraíle's wish to publish with Irish text only. De Búrca prevailed, and the book, titled The Great Book of Irish Genealogies, was published in five volumes (vols. IV and V consisting of indices alone) in 2004, with 3,100 pages in a full buckram gilt presentation box. It remains, according to a review the Journal of the Royal Society of Antiquaries of Ireland, Ó Muraíle's "significant [contribution to] Irish scholarship".

== Publications ==
The following is a provisional list of Ó Muraíle's publications.

=== Articles ===
- Filí chúige Connacht sa naoú aois déag, in Litríocht an 19ú haois / in eagar ag Pádraig Ó Fiannachta, Má Nuad: An Sagart, 1972
- Toirialach Ó Cearúlláin, same publication.
- Swinford and its Name:Some Aspects of Swinford History, in Swinford Re-Echo, Swinford, 1981.
- An Outline History of Co. Mayo, pp. 10–35, in Mayo: Aspects of its Heritage, ed. Bernard O'Hara, 1982. ISBN 0-9508233-0-9.
- Mayo Placenames, pp. 55–83, same publication.
- The Principal Surnames of Mayo,, page 83, same publication.
- Aois na Lámhscribhinni Móra, in The Maynooth Review, No. 9, pp. 42–72, 1983.
- The Barony-Names of Fermanagh and Monaghan, in Clogher Record, No.s 11–13, pp. 387–402, 1984.
- Mayo Placenames - Their names and Origins FNT Teoranta, Westport, 1985.
- The Gaelic personal name (an) Dubhaltach, in Ainm No. 2, pp. 1–26, 1987.
- The Autograph Manuscripts of the Annals of the Four Masters, in Celtica No. 19, pp. 75–95, 1987.
- Leabhar Ua Maine alias Leabhair Uí Dhubhagáin, in Éigse No.2, pp. 167–195, 1989.
- The Carneys of Connacht in Sages, Saints and Storytellers: Celtic Studies in Honour of Professor James Carney, pp. 342–357, ed. Ó Corráin, Breatnach and McCone, Maynooth, 1989. ISBN 1-870684-07-9.
- Ainmneacha na mbailte fearainn i seanpharóiste Chluain Fiacla, in Dúiche Néill 4 (1989) pp. 27–31.
- A page from Mac Fhir Bhisigh's "Genealogies", in Celtica No. 21, pp. 533–560, 1990.
- The name Cluain Fiacla: an additional note, Dúiche Néill 5 (1990) pp. 145–147.
- Pól Breathnach (1885–1941), Sagart, Saoi is Seanchaí, in Léachtaí Cholmcille No.23, pp. 81–120, 1992.
- The Irish genealogies as an onomastic source, in Nomina No.16, pp. 23–47, 1992.
- Ruaidhrí Ó hUiginn, scribe, of An Tearmann (fl. 1680), in Ainm 6 (1994) pp. 103–106. Addenda in Ainm 7 (1996–1997), pp. 93 and 101.
- Recent publications relating to Irish place-names, in Ainm 6 (1994) pp. 115–122.
- Agallamh na Seanórach, in Léachtaí Cholmcille No.25, pp. 96–127, 1995.
- : Irish genealogical collections: the Scottish dimension, in International Congress of Celtic Studies 10 (1995) (1999) pp. 251–264.
- Aspects Intellectual Life in Seventeenth Century Galway, in Galway:History and Society, ed Gerard Moran and Raymond Gillespie, pp. 149–211, 1996. ISBN 0-906602-75-0.
- BUPNS reprints 1 – introduction, in Ainm 7 (1996) p. 120.
- BUPNS reprints 3: the early days of the Ulster Place-Name Society, in Ainm 7 (1996) pp. 126–138.
- A 'lost' history of the Walsh family, 1588, in Éigse 30 (1997) pp. 133–157.
- Dubhaltach Mac Fhirbhisigh and County Galway, in "Journal of the Galway Archaeological and Historical Society", pp. 23–35, Vol. 49, 1997.
- Seán Ó Donnabháin, 'an cúigiú máistir', in Léachtaí Cholm Cille 27, (1997) pp. 11–82.
- Cathal Óg Mac Maghnusa: His Time, Life and Legacy, in Clogher Record, pp. 45–64, 1998.
- Cathal Óg Mac Maghnusa and the Annals of Ulster, by Aubrey Gwynn, in Clogher Record, 2/2 (1958) pp. 230–43 and 2/3 (1959), pp. 370–84. Ed. Nollaig Ó Muraíle, Enniskillen, 1998.
- Clann Bhaldraithe or Clann Bhaildrín, the Waldron Family - its origins, kindred and related names, in The Waldron Journal, pp. 6–22, volume 5, 1998.
- Table of contents of the Bulletin of the Ulster Place-Name Society (Series 2): 1978–82, (Ed. Deirdre Flanagan).
- The Ulster Place-Name Society, 1998–2000, in Ainm 8 (1998) pp. 158–161.
- Some Early Connacht Population Groups, in Seachas: Studies in Early and Medieval Irish Archaeology, History and Literature in Honour of Francis J. Byrne, ed. Alfred P. Smyth, Four Courts Press, Dublin, pp. 161–177, 2000. ISBN 1-85182-489-8.
- Settlement and Placenames in Gaelic Ireland c.1250-c.1650: Land, Lordship and Settlement, Patrick J. Duffy, David Edwards and Elizabeth FitzPatrick (eds.), pp. 223–245, Four Courts Press, 2001. ISBN 1-85182-800-1 pbk.
- Some Thoughts on Matters Onamastic, in Journal of the Galway Archaeological and Historical Society, pp. 23–41, volume 53, 2001.
- Uí Fhailghe, Uíbh Fhailí, etc.; The Name of Offaly, in Offaly Heritage: Journal of the Offaly Archaeological and Historical Society,, pp. 9–11, volume one, 2003.
- Linking Clann Aodhagáin with Mac Fhirbhisigh, in The Irish Genealogist, volume 11, no. 3, 2004.
- 'Prince of Irish historians': a great Meath historian, Fr. Paul Walsh (1885–1941), in LCC 34 (2004) pp. 28–104.
- Athchuairt ar lámhscríbhinní Chonnacht, in LCC 34 (2004) pp. 28–104.
- Temair/Tara and Other Places of the Name, in The Kingship and Landscape of Tara, ed. Edel Bhreathnach, Four Courts Press, Dublin, pp. 449–477, 2005. ISBN 1-85182-954-7.
- The Learned Family of Ó Cianáin/Keenan, in Clogher Record, pp. 387–436, 2005.
- Dubhaltach Mac Fhirbhisigh and County Mayo, in Journal of the Galway Archaeological and Historical Society, pp. 1–21, volume 58, 2006.
- A tract on the Connacht territory of Muintir Mhurchadha, in JCHAS 113 (2008) pp. 90–100.

=== Books ===
- Mayo Places: Their Names and Origins, 1985.
- The Celebrated Antiquary: Dubhaltach Mac Fhirbhisigh (c.1600-1671) - His Life, Lineage and Learning, An Sagart, Maynooth, 1996; reprinted 2003. ISBN 1903896 05 3; ISSN 0790-8806.
- Irish Leaders and Learning Through the Ages, Paul Walsh: Essays collected, edited and introduced by Nollaig Ó Muraile, 2003. ISBN 1-85182-543-6.
- The Great Book of Irish Genealogies, Dubhaltach Mac Fhirbhisigh: Edited with translation and indices by Nollaig Ó Muraíle: Five volumes. Dublin, De Búrca, 2004–2005. ISBN 0 946130 36 1.
- Turas na dTaoiseach nUltach as Éirinn from Ráth Maoláin to Rome: Tadhg Ó Cianáin's contemporary narrative of the "Flight of the Earls", 1607-8, (editor), Four Courts Press, Dublin, 2007. ISBN 978-88-901692-1-2.
- Mícheál Ó Cléirigh, His Associates and St Anthony's College Louvain, (editor), Four Courts Press, Dublin, 2007. ISBN 978-1-84682-082-3.
- Amhráin agus dánta Raiftearaí le Dúghlas de hÍde, (editor), Futa Fata. Mayo, 2018. ISBN 978-1-910945-33-9.

=== Introductions, editor, lectures ===
- Ainm: bulletin of the Ulster Place-Name Society 5, (1991), with Ruairí Ó hUiginn.
- Ainm: bulletin of the Ulster Place-Name Society 6 (1994)
- Ainm: bulletin of the Ulster Place-Name Society 7, (1996)
- Ainm: bulletin of the Ulster Place-Name Society 8, (1998)
- New introduction to the Annals of Ulster, volume one, pp. 1–73 (The Annals of Ulster, otherwise Annála Senait. A chronicle of Irish affairs from A.D. 431 to A.D. 1540. With translation, notes, and index.) Published by Éamonn de Búrca, Blackrock, Dublin, 1998.
- Contributor and reader to The Encyclopaedia of Ireland, general editor Brian Lalor, Gill & Macmillan, 2003. ISBN 0-7171-3000-2.
- Contributor to The Encyclopedia of the Medieval Chronicle, general editor Graeme Dunphy, 2009. ISBN 90-04-18464-3.
- Anthony Raftery: His life, Legend and Legacy, Galway Archaeological and Historical Society Lecture Series 2009/2010, 11 January 2010
