= Irish annals =

Irish chronicles

A number of Irish annals, of which the earliest was the Chronicle of Ireland, were compiled up to and shortly after the end of the 17th century. Annals were originally a means by which monks determined the yearly chronology of feast days. Over time, the obituaries of priests, abbots and bishops were added, along with those of notable political events. Most of the Irish annals were written between the 14th and 17th centuries.

== Chronology ==
The origins of annalistic compilation can be traced to the occasional recording of notes and events in blank spaces between the latercus, i.e. the 84-year Easter table adopted from Gaulish writer Sulpicius Severus (d. c. 423).

== Extant ==
Manuscript copies of extant annals include the following:

MAP of Irish locales linked to Irish Annals writing assembled by De Reir Book of Moytura team

- Annals of Boyle
- Annals of Clonmacnoise
- Annals of Connacht
- Annals of Duiske
- Annals of the Four Masters
- Annals of Inisfallen
- Annals of Lough Cé
- Annales de Monte Fernandi, a.k.a. Annals of Multyfarnham
- Annals of Roscrea
- Chronicon Scotorum
- Annals of Tigernach
- Annals of Ulster
- The Annals of Ireland by Friar John Clyn
- Annals of Dudley Loftus
- The Short Annals of Donegal
- Leabhar Oiris
- Annals of Nenagh
- Mac Carthaigh's Book
- Cogad Gáedel re Gallaib (large parts)
- Fragmentary Annals of Ireland (parts)
- Dublin Annals of Inisfallen
- The Annals of Ireland by Thady Dowling
- Short Annals of Tirconaill
- Short Annals of Leinster
- Annales Hibernie ab anno Christi 1162 usque ad annum 1370, a.k.a. Pembridge's Annals
- Annales Hiberniae, a.k.a. Grace's Annals
- Memoranda Gadelica
- Annla Gearra as Proibhinse Ard Macha, a.k.a. Short Annals of Armagh
- A Fragment of Irish Annals
- Annals from the Book of Leinster
- De Reir Book of Moytura a recommencement of the vulgate tradition of Irish Annals writing taking place at a scriptorium, an easy distance between where the Annals of Boyle, of Lough Key, of the Four Masters, of Ulster of Kilronan were assembled. (2020 -
- Dominican Annals of Roscommon

== Other sources ==
Others which contain annalistic material include:

- Leabhar Bhaile an Mhóta
- Lebor Glinne Dá Loch
- Lebor Leacáin
- Leabhar Uí Dhubhagáin
- Caithréim Chellacháin Chaisil
- Leabhar na nGenealach

Many of these annals have been translated and published by the School of Celtic Studies, Dublin Institute for Advanced Studies, or the Irish Texts Society. In addition, the text of many are available on the internet at the Corpus of Electronic Texts (CELT Project) hosted by the History Department of University College Cork, National University of Ireland. (See External links below)

The famous epic political tract Cogad Gáedel re Gallaib also contains a great deal of annalistic material from the Viking Age in Ireland which is to be found in no other surviving sources. Much of this was taken from the same sources ancestral to the Annals of Inisfallen, which have come down to us both abbreviated and lacunose.

== Lost annals ==
Annals known to have existed but which have been lost include:

- Annals of the Island of Saints
- Annals of Maolconary
- Book of Cuanu
- Book of Dub-da-leithe
- Book of the Monks
- Leabhar Airis Cloinne Fir Bhisigh
- Leabhar Airisen
- Leabhar Airisen Ghiolla Iosa Mhec Fhirbhisigh
- Synchronisms of Flann Mainstreach
- The Chronicle of Ireland

== Modern annals ==
- Chronology of Irish History to 1976
- The Chronicle of Ireland 1992–1996
