= Conn Oge O'Donnell =

Irish nobleman (died 1601)

Conn Oge O'Donnell (died 1601) was a member of the O'Donnell dynasty of Donegal.

He was the youngest son of Conn O'Donnell, and grandson of Calvagh O'Donnell who had ruled the O'Donnell lands of Tyrconnell. During the 1580s he supported the unsuccessful claims of his elder brother Niall Garve O'Donnell to the chieftainship of the O'Donnells. After initially supporting his rival and cousin the lord of Tyrconnell Hugh Roe O'Donnell and his ally Hugh O'Neill, Earl of Tyrone during Tyrone's Rebellion, Niall switched sides in 1600 to support the Crown forces, in particular the expedition landed under Sir Henry Docwra at Derry. Conn and two other brothers, Hugh Boy and Donal also defected bringing with them as many as a thousand warriors by some estimates. They assisted the Crown's capture of Lifford, a key O'Donnell stronghold, to the outrage of Hugh Roe who killed Niall Garve's young son (and Conn's nephew) in retaliation.

Conn played an active role in the fight against Hugh Roe, most notably during the Siege of Donegal in 1601. It was a lengthy and hard-fought conflict during which Donegal Abbey was wrecked by the explosion of barrels of gunpowder which had been stored there. During the fighting, Conn was fatally wounded. Although he had supported his elder brother Niall up to this point, he was in his own right an eligible candidate for the lordship of the O'Donnells. Conn died after the siege; Niall wrote on 24 September: "My brother Coyne Ooge is grievously hurt with the fall of a house and I fear will scarce recover."

== Bibliography ==
- McGurk, John. Sir Henry Docwra, 1564-1631: Derry's Second Founder. Four Courts Press, 2006.
- Morgan, Hiram. Tyrone's Rebellion. Boydell Press, 1993.
- O'Donnell, Eunan (2006). "Reflection on the Flight of the Earls" (PDF). Donegal Annual (58): 31–44.
