= Conn O'Donnell =

Irish nobleman (died 1583)

- Died: 13 March 1583
- Father: Calvagh O'Donnell

Conn McCalvagh O'Donnell (died 13 March 1583) was a member of the O'Donnell dynasty of Donegal. At various points in his turbulent career, Conn either opposed or allied himself with the English Crown, Shane O'Neill or Turlough Luineach O'Neill, as the situation and his personal advantage dictated in order to pursue his rivalry with his father's younger brother, Hugh mac Manus O'Donnell.

== Background and early career ==
Conn was the son of Calvagh O'Donnell, ruler of Tyrconnell. It is likely that Conn's mother was Calvagh's first wife. Calvagh had positioned his branch of the O'Donnell dynasty, settled at Lifford, as friendlier to Crown interests than that of Hugh mac Manus, who had rendered himself suspicious by his alliance with the rebellious Shane O'Neill. Calvagh had been considered several times for elevation to the peerage as Earl of Tyrconnell, although this was never put into effect.

Conn spoke English as well as the Irish language, probably as a result of fosterage under Sir Thomas Cusack.

Conn attempted to follow much the same policy as his father, being described by the Lord Deputy Thomas Radclyffe as "the likelyest plante that ever sprange in Ulster to graffe a good subject on."

The earliest mention of Conn is in 1557 when he participated in a daring night time raid at Balleeghan, Co. Donegal which halted a campaign undertaken by Shane O'Neill and Hugh mac Manus O'Donnell to undermine the leadership of Calvagh.

== Factional leader ==
In 1561, Calvagh was betrayed by a cabal of his subjects and captured by Shane O'Neill, after which Conn assumed effective leadership of the Lifford faction of the O'Donnell dynasty.

Initially, Conn sought Crown assistance to release his father. But in 1562 Conn allegedly entered into an agreement with Shane by which Conn would consent to the continued imprisonment of his father in exchange for safe possession of his father's estates. However, in May 1564 Conn found himself in Shane's captivity as a result of a failed attempt to oust from Donegal Castle his great uncle, Hugh mac Hugh Dubh Óg, a partisan of his rival, Hugh mac Manus O'Donnell.

Shane released Conn in May 1567, at the same time delivering to Conn possession of the castles at Ballyshannon and Belleek, which were traditionally considered perquisites of the lordship of Tyrconnell that rightfully belonged to Hugh mac Manus since the latter's election in 1566 to succeed Calvagh in that office. The conflict seems to have been temporarily resolved by mutual agreement before 30 October 1567, when Conn was made tanist to Hugh mac Manus.

In early July 1568 Conn raided Armagh town, which at that time was under the authority of the Archbishop of Armagh, whose nomination was controlled by the English Crown.

In July 1573 Conn sought rapprochement with the Crown. However, he was imprisoned by the Earl of Essex, allegedly through treachery, in 1574. By Autumn 1575 Conn had escaped and obtained a pardon from the returning Lord Deputy, Sir Henry Sidney.

The circumstances of Conn's death are not known.

== Family and legacy ==
Many accounts of Conn's family, probably based on the work of 19th-century historian John O'Donovan, state that Conn married a daughter of Turlough Luineach O'Neill. However, the only accounts citing specific contemporary documents state that Conn married Rose, daughter of Shane O'Neill, sometime after 29 September 1562. The confusion may arise from Shane's aggressive behaviour towards the O'Donnells and a reference to Conn as "cousin", interpreted wrongly in the broader Elizabethan sense of "relative", to Turlough Luineach. Conn and Turlough most certainly were cousins in the fully modern sense, as Turlough's mother, Rose O'Donnell, was a sister or half-sister of Conn's father, Calvagh.

Conn's wife, Rose O'Neill, died in 1585.

Conn had four notable sons Niall Garve, Hugh Boy, Donal and Conn Oge O'Donnell.

After Conn's death and while these sons were minors, the claim to chieftainship of the O'Donnell clan and lordship over Tyrconnell of this branch of the dynasty was upheld by Hugh "mac an Déagánaigh" (English: "son of the dean") O'Gallagher who was presented as a natural son of Calvagh but was probably actually Conn's son-in-law.

All traceable branches of the O'Donnell dynasty which are currently known to have survived the 17th century descend from Conn in the direct male line, although these also descend from his rival Hugh mac Manus through female ancestors.

=== Issue ===
The historian Terry Clavin states that Conn's son Niall Garve had eight brothers, which would mean that Conn had nine sons. The historian John J. Silke states that Conn (who appears to have been married prior to Rose O'Neill) had eight sons. John O'Donovan clarifies that Conn had nine sons, eight of which survived him. Six of the sons died without issue; of these, five met violent deaths.

Name	Mother	Date of birth	Date of death	Notes	Ref.
Naghtan			1582	Slain	
Calvagh Oge			1583/1588	Slain	
Manus		Conn's third eldest son	1589	Slain	
Niall Garve	Rose O'Neill, daughter of Shane O'Neill	c. 1569	1626	Rival to his cousin Hugh Roe O'Donnell. Defected to the Crown in 1600. Instigated O'Doherty's rebellion in 1608 and imprisoned in the Tower of London for life.	
Hugh Boye		Conn's fifth eldest son	1649	Both Hugh Boye and Donal submitted to authorities on 14 June 1608 for their roles in O'Doherty's rebellion. Both were liberated from prison in 1609 after giving security.	
Conn Oge		Conn's sixth or youngest son	September 1601	Fatally injured in the Siege of Donegal. (Note: Conn Oge did not die during the battle, which took place on 19 September. Niall Garve wrote on 24 September: "My brother Coyne Ooge is grievously hurt with the fall of a house and I fear will scarce recover.")	
Calvagh		Conn's seventh son		Slain by Donal O'Donnell, son of Hugh McManus O'Donnell	
Cathbharr		Conn's eighth eldest son		Slain by "the rebel McGuire", possibly Hugh Maguire	
Donal		Conn's ninth eldest son		Both Hugh Boye and Donal submitted to authorities on 14 June 1608 for their roles in O'Doherty's rebellion. Both were liberated from prison in 1609 after giving security.	
Róise				Married Tuathal O'Gallagher	
Elizabeth				Married Cathbharr O'Donnell, son of Hugh Dubh O'Donnell	
Siobhan					
Máire				Married O'Boyle	

== Bibliography ==
=== Primary sources ===
- Annals of the Four Masters. CELT: Corpus of Electronic Texts. 2008 [1636].
- Mahaffy, Robert Pentland, ed. (1912). Calendar of the State Papers relating to Ireland, 1601-03. His Majesty's Stationery Office.
- O'Donovan, John, ed. (1854). Annals of the Kingdom of Ireland by the Four Masters from the Earliest Period to the Year 1616 (PDF). Vol. VI. Dublin.

=== Secondary sources ===
- Clavin, Terry (October 2009). "O'Donnell, Sir Niall Garvach". Dictionary of Irish Biography. doi:10.3318/dib.006345.v1.
- Dunlop, Robert (1895). "O'Donnell, Niall Garv" . In Lee, Sidney (ed.). Dictionary of National Biography. Vol. 41. London: Smith, Elder & Co. pp. 443–444.
- McGettigan, Darren (2005). Red Hugh O'Donnell and the Nine Years War. Dublin: Four Courts Press. ISBN 978-1-8518-2887-6. OL 11952048M.
- Morgan, Hiram (1993). Tyrone's Rebellion: The outbreak of the Nine Years' War in Tudor Ireland. London: The Boydell Press. ISBN 0-85115-683-5.
- Morgan, Hiram (2002). Ó Riain, Pádraig (ed.). "The Real Red Hugh". Irish Texts Society. London: 1–35.
- O'Donnell, Eunan (2006). "Reflection on the Flight of the Earls" (PDF). Donegal Annual (58): 31–44.
- Silke, John J. (23 September 2004). "O'Donnell [Ó Domhnaill], Sir Niall Garbh (1568/9–1626?), magnate and soldier". Oxford Dictionary of National Biography (online ed.). Oxford University Press. doi:10.1093/ref:odnb/20558. (Subscription, Wikipedia Library access or UK public library membership required.)
- Silke, John J. (23 September 2004b). "O'Donnell, Calvagh, lord of Tyrconnell". Oxford Dictionary of National Biography (online ed.). Oxford University Press. (Subscription, Wikipedia Library access or UK public library membership required.)
- Walsh, Paul (1929). "The Book of O'Donnell's Daughter". The Irish Ecclesiastical Record. XXXIII. Dublin: 561–575.
