= Memoranda Gadelica =

Irish annal

Memoranda Gadelica aka Dublin, Trinity College MS H. 4. 31, is an Irish annal, covering the years 1582 to 1665, with some gaps.

== Overview ==
This annals features notices and obits of the Mac Aonghusa family of Uíbh Eathach (see Uí Echach Cobo in what is now County Down. It also features references to other Ulster families such as Ó Néill, Ó Domhnaill, Ó Dochartaigh, O Dúbheanaigh. To that end it might be more properly regarded as a book of obituaries of prominent people, much like the Annals of Nenagh.

The years 1583-88 are missing, as are 1590–94, 1596–1600, 1602, 1604–06, 1609–11, 1613–15, 1619–27, 1632–33, 1639, 1642–47, 1650–51, 1653, 1655–60.

All entries are brief (1589 - Domhnall mac Briain Megaonghusa do mharbhadh.). Even those years with additional information (1608- Cathir O Dochartaigh do mharbhadh 1 Augustij. Aodh mac Feidhlim Mac Aonghusa do mharbhadh. 1618 - Inghion Meagaonghusa. i. cuntaois Thíre Eoghain ar b-fagháil bháis san Róimh 15 Martij. Art mac an Bharúin Uí Néill ar b-fagháil bhais 28 Novembris.) consist of merely two or more obits.

The editor added some twenty supplemental footnotes to further identify some of the persons named, such as sub anno 1589, 1612, 1629, 1638, 1663.

== Final entries ==
- 1663 - Brian Ruadh Mhagaonghusa mac Glaisne mic Eachmhilidh mic Domhnaill Chéir mic Aodh mic Airt an Lámhaigh mic Aodh mic Airt na Madhmann ar b-faghail bháis sa Tulach Breifneach a g-cuntaoi Liattroma a g-cóigeadh Chonnacht 23 Aprill 1663 & ar n-ionnlacadh a d-Teampall Cluana san aimsir chéadna ("One Glasney mac Cawley, according to the custom of tanistry, is made Magennis by Tirone upon the death of Sir Hugh Magennis, to the disinheriting of Arthur his son, notwithstanding he Arthur married the Earl's daughter," Calendar of State Papers, 1596, January 26, page 457. "Glasney mac Agholy Magenis of Clare, in the co. of Down, esq., received in 1611 a grant of the lordship of Clanconnell, including 13 townlands ... These lands are situated in the parishes of Tullylish and Donaghclony," Montgomery MSS., 306. Is dócha gurab ionann Donaghclony annso agus Teampall Cluana san nóta thuas. "Against this man Sir Arthur is there one Glasny mac Agholy Magenis in faction, who I fear me is not sufficiently countenanced," April 25, 1608, O'Grady Cat., 395.)
- 1665 - Glaisne Og Magaonghusa mac Glaisne mic Eachmhilidh ar b-fagháil bháis a d-tiamchioll an treas la do January 1665.

== See also ==
- Annla Gearra as Proibhinse Ard Macha
- Chronicon Scotorum
- Short Annals of Leinster
