= Nuala O'Connor =

Nuala O'Connor may refer to:

- Finola O'Donnell, born Finola O'Connor and also known as Nuala, 15th-century Irish noblewoman
- Nuala O'Connor (technologist), privacy expert who served as First Chief Privacy Officer for the US Department of Homeland Security from 2003 to 2005
- Nuala Ní Chonchúir, also known as Nuala O'Connor, Irish writer
