= Donegal Abbey =

Coordinates: 54.6504°N 8.1152°W

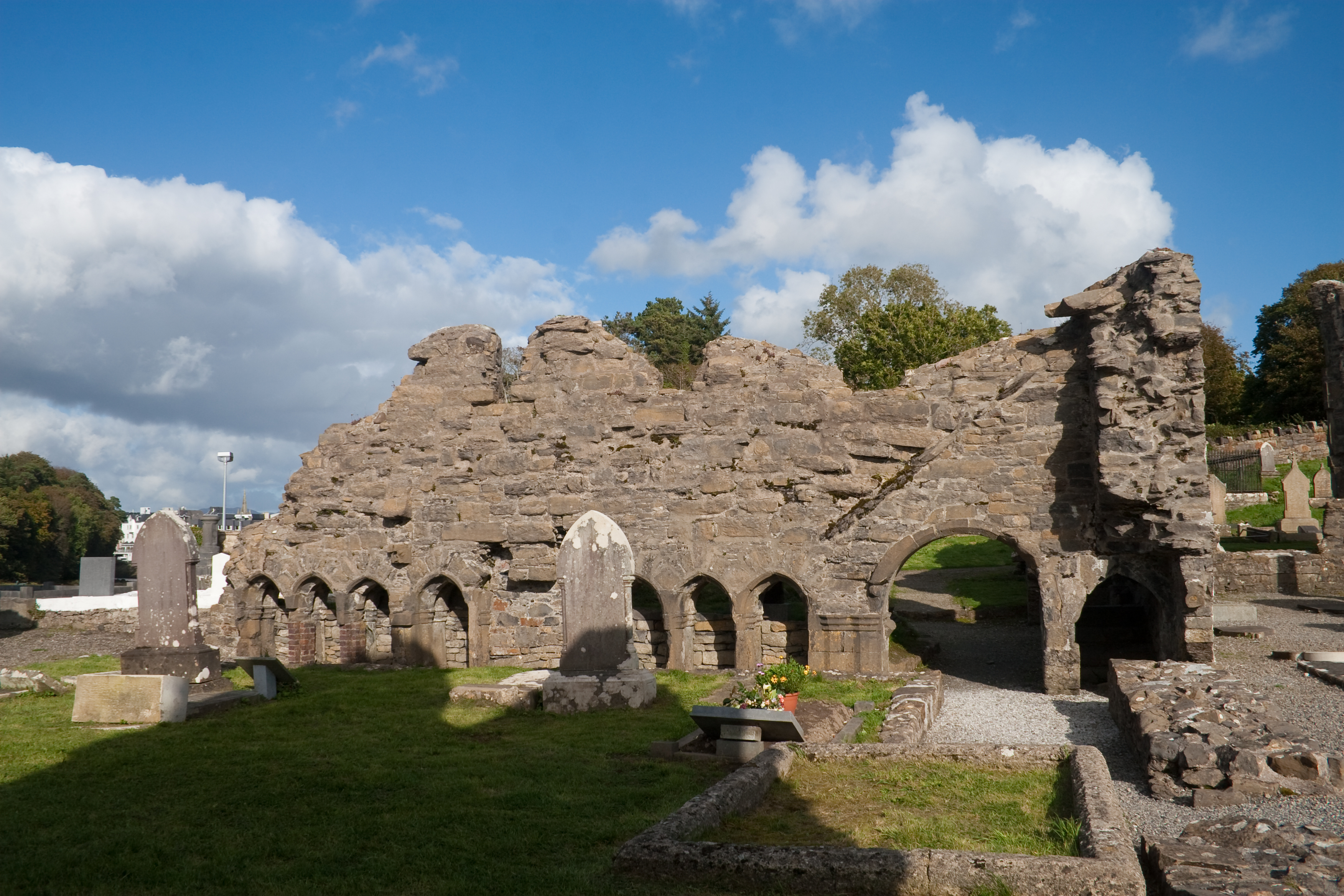
Cloister at Donegal Abbey

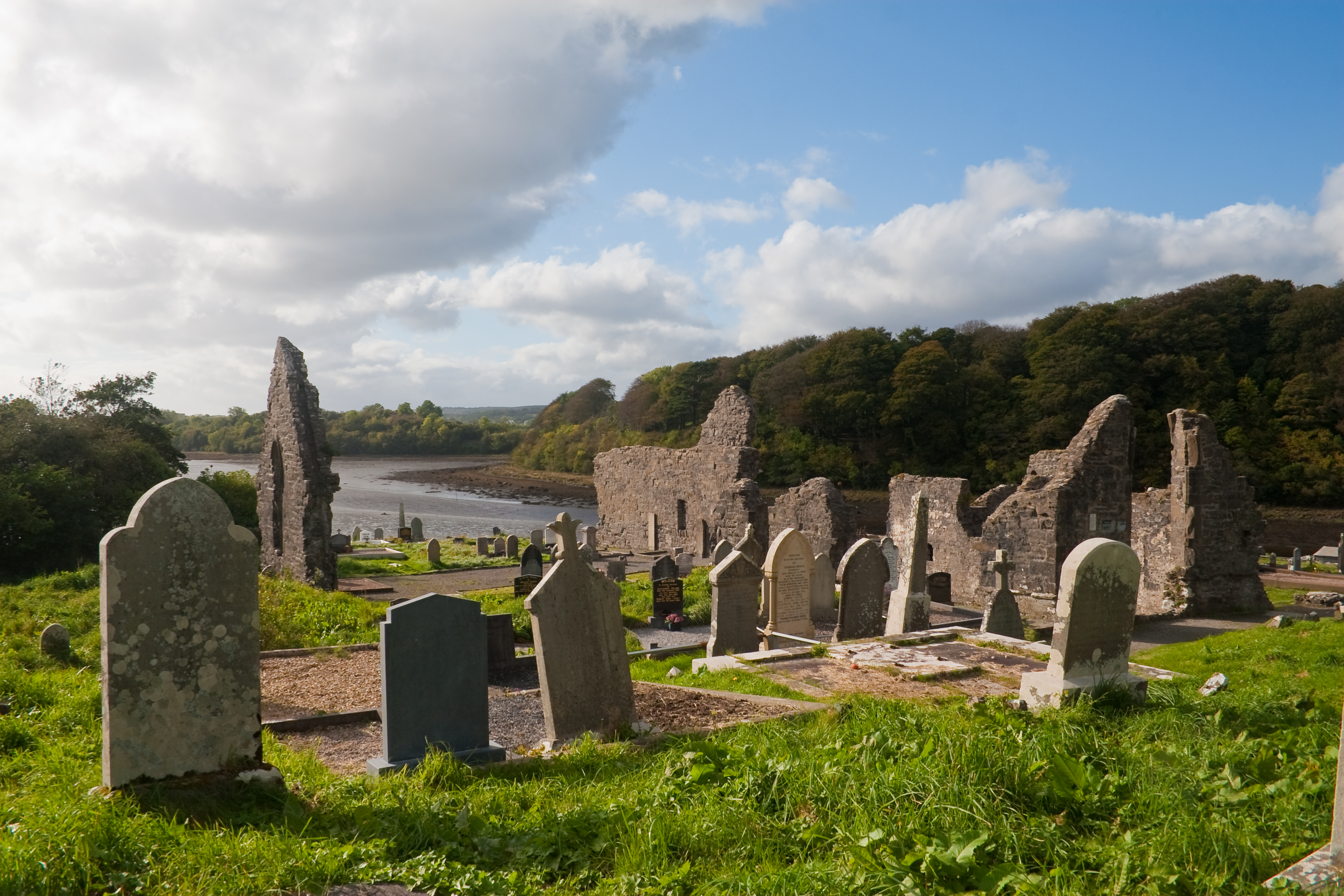
A view of Donegal Abbey looking towards Donegal Bay.

Donegal Abbey (Irish: Mainistir Dhún na nGall) is a ruined Franciscan Priory in Donegal in Ireland. It was constructed by the O'Donnell dynasty in the fifteenth century and remained a center of Classical Christian education even after its destruction during the Nine Years War. It is sometimes referred to as Donegal Friary.

It was built in 1474 on the orders of the leading Gaelic lord of the area, the ruler of Tyrconnell Hugh Roe O'Donnell, the First, and his wife Finola O'Brien.

In the Nine Years' War, the Abbey was used for a meeting between the rebel leadership and envoys of the Spanish King Philip II. The Abbey was the scene of fighting during the 1601 Siege of Donegal when a force led by Red Hugh O'Donnell attempted to capture the town from Crown forces led by the Gaelic warrior Niall Garve O'Donnell. During the fighting Niall Garve's younger brother Conn O'Donnell was killed.

It is also the burial place of Hugh McManus O'Donnell, who died in 1600 after many years residing there among the Franciscans.

== Description ==
The abbey is located in the town of Donegal in County Donegal, Ireland. It is situated at the mouth of the River Eske, where it empties into Donegal Bay, to the west of the town centre.

== History ==
Donegal Abbey was founded in 1474 by Finola O'Donnell (née O'Connor, also known as Nuala O'Donnell), and her husband Hugh Roe O'Donnell. Finola was a member of a powerful family of princes in Leinster, while Hugh was the king of Tyrconnell, what is now County Donegal. According to a 17th-century account in Latin by one of the abbey's friars, translated to English by Charles Patrick Meehan, Finola made a journey of around 100 miles (160 km) with a number of women to the monastery at Ross Errilly Friary in County Galway, where Franciscan monks were holding a provincial chapter. The purpose of her journey was to request the founding of a Franciscan monastery in Tyrconnell. Her request was initially refused, but according to the account she replied: "What! I have journeyed a hundred miles to attain the object that has long been dearest to my heart, and will you now venture to deny my prayer? If you do, beware of God’s wrath, for I will appeal to His throne and charge you with the loss of all the souls which your reluctance may cause to perish in the territory of Tirconnell!". This plea was successful, and a number of Franciscans agreed to accompany her back to Tyrconnell. They began building the abbey, at a site next to the wharf in Donegal, which the account described as "a lovely spot, and sweetly suggestive of holy meditations".

Later in 1474, before the abbey was completed, Finola O'Donnell died. Hugh Roe married again, to Fingalla O'Brien, and she continued Finola's work, ensuring that the monastery, church cloisters and other features were completed successfully. The abbey was dedicated that same year. In 1505, Hugh Roe O'Donnell died and was succeeded by his son, Hugh Oge. Fingalla withdrew from public life after the accession of her son, living a life of austerity and prayer in a small house close to the abbey.

Creevelea Abbey, located in what is now Dromahair, County Leitrim was founded in 1508 by Eóghan O'Ruairc, Lord of West Bréifne, and his wife Margaret O'Brian, daughter of a King of Thomond, as a daughter foundation of Donegal Abbey.

By 1601, the town of Donegal was under the control of the English crown, following an alliance made between Sir Hugh O'Donnell, a descendant of the original Hugh Roe, and the English as part of the Tudor conquest of Ireland., but the original condition of that was that his eldest son, Sir Donal O'Donnell by his first marriage would be the Sheriff of Donegal rather than an English captain. In this way, he kept the English out, while managing dynastic survival. Shortly after the Armada shipwreck of 1588, Sir Donal O'Donnell was knighted and appointed as Sheriff of Donegal by the Lord Deputy William FitzWilliam. Sir Donal was the leading contender in the O'Donnell succession dispute of the 1580s which took place while his father was still alive. His personal jurisdiction covered "that part of Tirconnell from the mountain westwards, i.e. from Barnesmore to the river Drowes (i.e. Tirhugh), and also all the inhabitants of Boylagh and Tir Boghaine (i.e. Bannagh)". Faced with the eclipse of her son Hugh Roe's position, Iníon Dubh acted decisively. She raised the clans of Donegal which remained loyal to her husband and summoned large numbers of Redshanks from the Highlands and Islands of her native Scotland to confront her son's rival. Sir Donal was defeated and killed in action at the Battle of Doire Leathan on 14 September 1590. Meanwhile, Sir Donal O'Donnell was survived by his only son, Donal Oge O'Donnell. But Sir Hugh's son by his second marriage, Hugh Roe O'Donnell, the Second, was strongly anti-English and began rebel activity from an early age. He was captured twice by English forces, escaping both times, before seeking an alliance with Spain which led to the Nine Years' War. In Hugh Roe's absence, Tyrconnell was ruled by a rival, his cousin Niall Garve O'Donnell, who made terms with the English government and set up his base at the abbey. Hugh Roe attacked in 1601 to try to reclaim the territory, but was unable to do so. During the battle, on 10 August 1601, a fire broke out at the abbey which in turn ignited a store of gunpowder kept by Niall Garve. The resulting explosion destroyed most of the building and killed hundreds of Niall Garve's soldiers, including his brother Conn Oge O'Donnell.

== Legacy ==
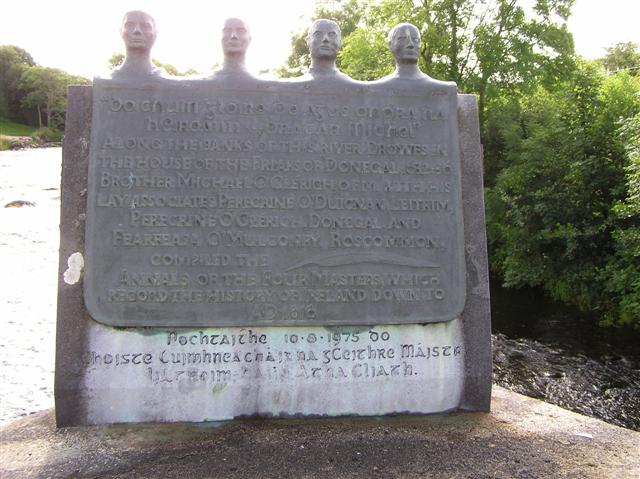
Monument to the Four Masters, located at the bridge over the Drowes River near Kinlough, near the homeland of Cú Choigríche Ó Duibhgeannáin

The abbey was not rebuilt, and remains in ruins, but the Franciscan friars set up a new base at Bundrowes in Bundoran close to the River Drowes. There, the monks of Donegal Abbey such as Mícheál Ó Cléirigh, Cú Choigríche Ó Duibhgeannáin, and Fearfeasa Ó Maol Chonaire worked between 1632 and 1636 in Donegal Abbey's most important legacy. After first acquiring many different antiquarian manuscripts and monastic chronicles that recorded more than two thousand years of Irish history, they combined the accounts from their memories and manuscripts into the vitally important primary historical source that has since been dubbed the Annals of the Four Masters.

In 1870, Fr. Charles Patrick Meehan wrote, "A silver chalice, of fine workmanship, now in the possession of an Irish priest in Quebec, bears the following inscription in Irish: 'Mary, daughter of Maguire, wife of Brian Oge O'Ruairc, caused this chalice to be made for her soul, for the Friars of Donegal, the age of Christ, 1633'. Inside the pedestal -- 'John O'Mullarkey, O'Donnell's silversmith, made me."

On 27 September 1992, Pope John Paul II Beatified Concobhar Ó Duibheannaigh (c.1532-1612), a Franciscan priest from Donegal Abbey and Bishop of Down and Conor who was hanged, drawn and quartered outside the walls of Dublin in February 1612, as one of the 24 officially recognized Irish Catholic Martyrs. His feast day is June 20.

== Bibliography ==
- Lennon, Colm. Sixteenth Century Ireland. Gill and MacMillan, 1994.
- McGurk, John. Sir Henry Docwra, 1564-1631: Derry's Second Founder. Four Courts Press, 2006.
- Morgan, Hiram (1999), Tyrone's Rebellion, Boydell Press
- O'Donnell, Francis Martin (2018). The O'Donnells of Tyrconnell : a hidden legacy. Washington DC: Academica Press LLC. ISBN 978-1-680534740.
- Rowan, Alistair. North West Ulster: The Counties of Londonderry, Donegal, Fermanagh and Tyrone. Yale University Press, 1979.
