= William Mostian =

Soldier and official in 16th century Ireland

William Mostian or Mostyn was a soldier and public official in sixteenth century Ireland.

He was the son of an English father and an Irish mother.

When the traditional Gaelic lordship of Tyrconnell was shired by the Crown as County Donegal in 1585, Mostian was appointed by the Lord Deputy John Perrot as Sheriff of the county. This brought him into dispute with Sir Hugh O'Donnell, the lord of Tyrconnell. O'Donnell, despite being a traditional ally of the Crown, resented this move to undermine his own dominance in the area and drove Mostian out. A later sheriff Humphrey Willis, was similarly driven out of Donegal in the opening stages of what became Tyrone's Rebellion in the 1590s.

Mostian was identified as a strong supporter of the Welsh-born official Perrot who referred to him as "my man". He held the rank of captain in the Irish Army, but also acted as a mercenary. He became involved in disputes between the Gaelic lords of Ulster, being hired by Turlough O'Neill to reassert his dominance over Hugh Maguire in Fermanagh.

In 1588 Mostian returned to Donegal where he and his younger brother Hugh Mostian raided across the area, ransacking Donegal Abbey at one point. The behavior of "government-backed desperadoes" such as the Mostian brothers, Humphrey Willis and John Connill has been attributed to pushing many otherwise loyal figures in Donegal towards joining Tyrone's Rebellion. Ironically, however, William's brother Hugh served as a mercenary in the rebel forces of Hugh Roe O'Donnell during the conflict.

== Bibliography ==
- Morgan, Hiram. Tyrone's Rebellion. Boydell Press, 1999.
