= Binnion =

Binnion may refer to:

- Binnion (hill), a classification of Irish hill

== People with the surname ==
- Benny Binion (1904-1989), American gambler and mobster
- Travis Binnion (born 1986), English footballer

== See also ==
- Battle of Binnion Hill
