= Niall Garbh O'Donnell =

Irish nobleman and soldier (c. 1569–1626)

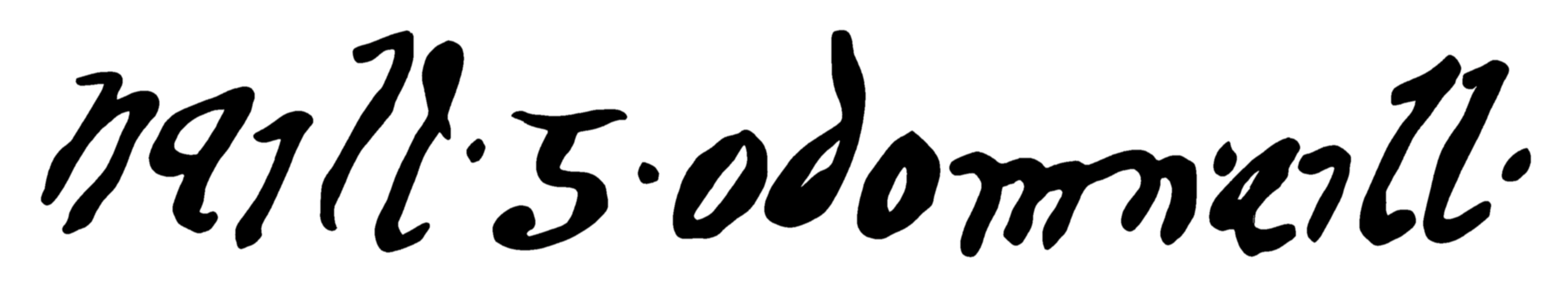
- Signature, 1601

Lord of Tyrconnell
- Reign: April 1603 – 1626
- Inauguration: April 1603
- Predecessor: Hugh Roe O'Donnell
- Successor: Dormant
- Born: c. 1569; Castlefin, Tyrconnell, Ireland
- Died: 1626 (aged 57); Tower of London, England
- Spouse: Nuala O'Donnell (m. 1591; sep. 1600)
- Issue: Naghtan (c. 1591–c. 1623); Manus (died 1646); Unnamed child (c. 1596–1601)
- House: O'Donnell dynasty
- Father: Conn O'Donnell
- Mother: Rose O'Neill

Sir Niall Garbh O'Donnell (Irish: Niall Garbh Ó Domhnaill; c. 1569 – 1626) (Note: Unless otherwise stated, all dates before 1752 are given in the Julian calendar, which was used in the Kingdom of Ireland throughout Niall Garbh O'Donnell's lifetime.) was an Irish nobleman and soldier who alternately rebelled against and supported English rule in Ireland. During the Nine Years' War he defected from the Irish confederacy and sided with the Crown against his cousin Hugh Roe O'Donnell, with the aim of restoring the lordship of Tyrconnell to his own branch of the O'Donnell clan.

Although Niall's paternal grandfather Calvagh ruled Tyrconnell, in 1557 the lordship was seized by Niall's half-uncle Hugh McManus O'Donnell. Following a violent succession conflict, Hugh McManus's son Hugh Roe—Niall's younger cousin—succeeded to the lordship in 1592. A long lasting bitterness ensued between the two cousins.

Niall initially fought for Hugh Roe and the Irish confederacy, but in 1600 he entered secret negotiations with English commander Henry Docwra. The government hoped to harness Niall's feud against Hugh Roe and promised him the lordship of Tyrconnell for his military assistance. Niall defected in October bringing many followers with him. Niall's skills in guerrilla warfare emboldened the royal troops and allowed Docwra to significantly weaken Irish forces in Ulster. However, Niall's desire to rule Tyrconnell as a sovereign entity was incompatible with the Plantation of Ulster, and after the war ended, the majority of Tyrconnell's land was granted back to Hugh Roe's immediate family.

Niall was inaugurated as the O'Donnell clan chief in April 1603. Following years of land rights disputes, he turned against the Crown in 1608. He covertly instigated fellow spurned loyalist Cahir O'Doherty to launch a rebellion in Derry, but he was quickly implicated and put on trial for treason. Faced with a sympathetic jury that would almost certainly acquit, the government sent Niall to the Tower of London in 1609, where he remained until his death seventeen years later.

== Early life (1569–1586) ==
Niall Garbh O'Donnell was born c. 1569 into the O'Donnell clan, the ruling Gaelic Irish noble family of Tyrconnell. He was the fourth (Note: Morgan and Silke state that Niall was Conn's eldest son, but O'Donovan states that Niall was Conn's fourth son. Three of Niall's brothers died during the 1580–1592 Tyrconnell succession dispute. Thus Niall was the fourth son who became Conn's eldest son following the death of his three elder brothers.) son of Conn O'Donnell, head of the O'Donnells' MacCalvagh branch, and Rose O'Neill, daughter of O'Neill clan chief Shane O'Neill. Niall's brothers included Naghtan, Calvagh Oge, Manus, Hugh Boye, Conn Oge, Donal, and Cathbharr. His sisters were Róise, Elizabeth, Siobhan and Máire.

Niall's sobriquet "Garbh" (Note: Other anglicisations include Garve, Garv and Garvach.) meant "rough". According to historian Paul Walsh, this epithet was traditional with O'Donnell clansmen named Niall, and has no special significance in his case; his ancestor, who ruled Tyrconnell from 1422 to 1439, was also named Niall Garbh. As a child, Niall was fostered to the MacLeans of Scotland's Western Isles.

Niall's paternal grandfather, Calvagh O'Donnell, ruled Tyrconnell in the mid-1560s. In 1557, Calvagh's half-brother Hugh McManus turned against the family. His allies imprisoned Conn, Calvagh's son and tanist. When Calvagh died in 1566, Hugh McManus easily established himself as the new Lord of Tyrconnell. Conn and his descendants, particularly Niall, looked to the English-led Irish government as a means of restoring their branch of the family to power. This branch established themselves in Lifford, between the River Finn and Lough Swilly, and were constantly at odds with the ruling O'Donnells. The MacCalvagh family estate, which Niall inherited, totalled 12,900 acres of land and included Finn Castle (now Castlefin), where he was probably born. His father Conn died in March 1583; his mother Rose died in 1585.

== Succession dispute (1587–1593) ==
Family tree

Niall Garbh O'Donnell and selected relatives

Siobhán; O'Neill
Fiona "Iníon; Dubh"; MacDonald	Hugh; McManus; O'Donnell c. 1520–1600
Hugh; Roe; O'Donnell; 1572–1602	Nuala; O'Donnell c. 1575–c. 1630

Manus; O'Donnell; 1490–1564
Calvagh; O'Donnell c. 1515–1566	Shane; O'Neill c. 1530–1567
Conn; O'Donnell d. 1583	Rose; O'Neill d. 1585
Niall; Garbh; O'Donnell c. 1569–1626

Legend

XXX	Subject of the article	XXX	Inaugurated chief of Tyrconnell

In 1587, Hugh McManus's son and tanist Hugh Roe O'Donnell was kidnapped on the orders of the Lord Deputy and imprisoned in Dublin Castle. Hugh McManus became prematurely senile, and a long-running succession dispute broke out within the greater O'Donnell family over who would succeed him. Three of Niall's brothers died during the conflict: Naghtan in 1582, Calvagh Oge in 1588, and Manus in 1589.

Hugh McManus's Scottish wife Iníon Dubh effectively took over leadership of Tyrconnell and used her Scottish redshanks to eliminate rival claimants and defend Hugh Roe's claim to the chieftaincy. On her orders, her redshanks killed Calvagh's son Hugh MacEdegany in May 1588. After Hugh MacEdegany's death, Niall took over as the head of the MacCalvagh faction. Niall had a significant following within Tyrconnell, but he was apparently not powerful enough to provoke an assault from Iníon Dubh.

Niall was supported by his neighbour Turlough Luineach O'Neill of Tír Eoghain, who had succeeded Niall's maternal grandfather Shane as O'Neill clan chief. In turn, Niall supported Turlough in attacks against the latter's rival Hugh O'Neill, Earl of Tyrone, who had formed an alliance with the ruling O'Donnell branch. On 1 May 1589, Niall fought alongside Turlough and defeated Tyrone in battle.

Royal forces took advantage of the clan's internal conflict and began pillaging and raiding across Tyrconnell. At one point Hugh McManus was kidnapped by Captain John Connill, but he was rescued by Niall. Despite the continued looting by government troops, Tyrconnell's nobility remained obsessed with their succession conflict. Iníon Dubh temporarily bought off Niall with a political marriage to her daughter Nuala, his first cousin once-removed, in an attempt to temper his hostility. (Note: In 1922, Paul Walsh stated that Nuala and Niall Garbh married prior to Hugh Roe's inauguration (which took place on 23 April 1592). In 1929 he stated that Nuala and Niall Garbh married prior to the latter's submission to Hugh Roe in 1592. Helena Concannon stated that Nuala and Niall Garbh married "perhaps about 1591".) Niall used his marriage to ingratiate himself with the ruling O'Donnell branch, and by 1592, he was in a strong position to claim Tyrconnell's lordship.

Hugh Roe escaped prison and returned to Tyrconnell in early 1592; Tyrone bribed officials in Dublin to secure his release. Hugh McManus abdicated in favour of Hugh Roe, who was inaugurated as clan chief on 23 April 1592. Niall was incensed at his cousin's successful assertion of the lordship. He was conspicuously absent from the inauguration ceremony, and was instead in Dublin unsuccessfully attempting to secure support from the government.

Soon after Hugh Roe's inauguration, Hugh Roe and Tyrone attacked Turlough, forcing him to surrender in May 1593. In July 1592, Lord Deputy William FitzWilliam agreed to conditionally overlook Hugh Roe's anti-royalist activities, one condition being that Hugh Roe's rivals be treated fairly. Despite his promise to FitzWilliam, Hugh Roe quickly subjugated his rivals. A significant claimant, Hugh Dubh O'Donnell, submitted to Hugh Roe after many of his followers were beheaded. These beheadings intimidated Niall to submit to Hugh Roe "wholly through fear... by the point and edge of the sword". Niall was forced to turn over control of Lifford's castle, though his ambitions to seize the lordship remained.

== Irish confederacy (1593–1599) ==
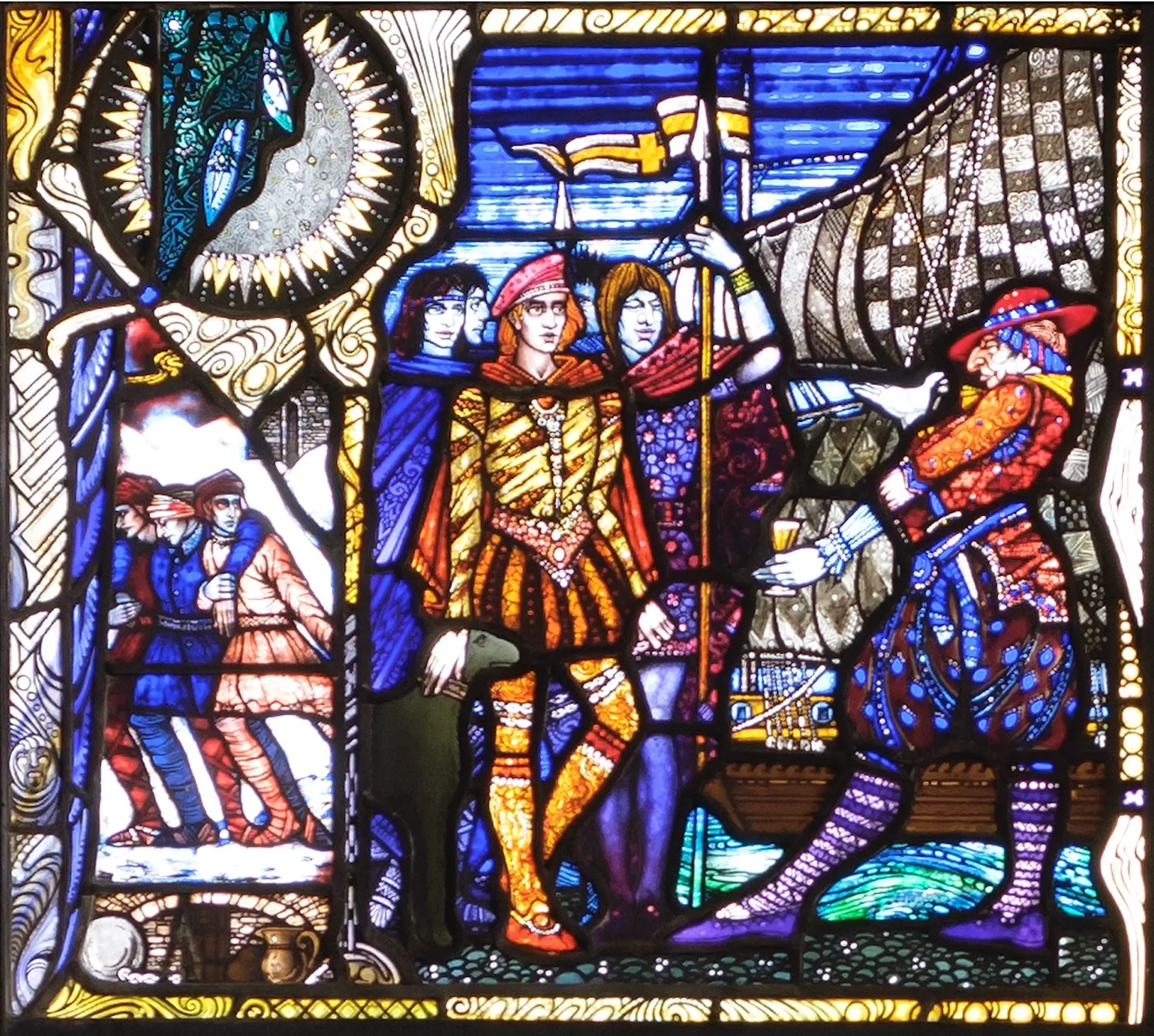
Hugh Roe was Niall's rival in his pursuit of Tyrconnell's lordship

Niall fought for the Irish confederacy, which was led by Hugh Roe and Tyrone, during the early years of the Nine Years' War. Hugh Roe sent him to assist commander Hugh Maguire in 1592. On Hugh Roe's orders, he commanded 60 horsemen, 60 swordsmen and 100 gallowglass to the Battle of Belleek in October 1593. This was one of the first major battles of the war but was secretly planned to result in an Irish failure. This would divert English attention away from Ireland and make the Irish confederacy seem weaker than it actually was. As part of the plan, Hugh Roe was ordered by Tyrone not to send reinforcements. Historian James O'Neill has theorised that Hugh Roe intentionally dispatched Niall to Belleek with the hope that he would die in the slaughter, thus easily eliminating a potential enemy.

Niall's continued belligerence led him to be detained in February 1594. He was only released when he gave one of his brothers to Hugh Roe as a pledge of good behaviour. In late 1597, Niall told two of Hugh Roe's enemies, imprisoned in Donegal, that he would join the English if their forces were sent there. In 1597 and 1598, Hugh Roe sent Niall on military expeditions into Connacht. From at least 1598, Tyrone had his doubts about the sincerity of Niall's loyalty. Hugh Roe was seemingly more trusting of Niall, as he left him in charge of the siege of Collooney castle in July 1599. Niall presumably fought at the Battle of Curlew Pass in August 1599.

== Defection (1600–1602) ==
=== Arrival of Henry Docwra ===
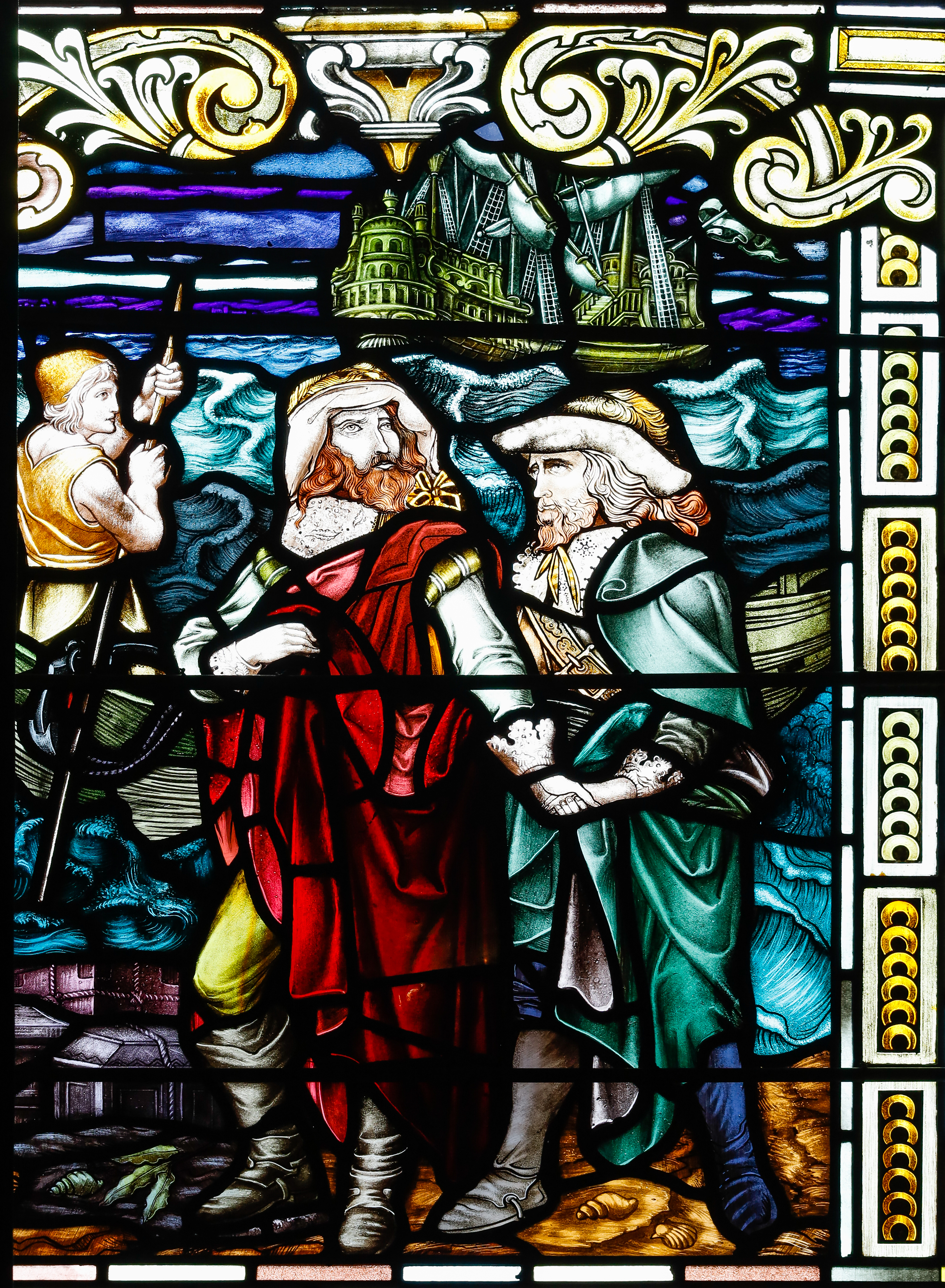
Depiction of Henry Docwra in a stained-glass window

In May 1600, royal commander Henry Docwra established an English garrison in Derry. The government believed that the divisions within the major Irish clans could be exploited in order to win Gaelic support for the Crown. The prospects of Docwra's mission counted on luring disaffected confederates. Niall had already made overtures to the government, and Docwra had instructions to win him over. They began secretly communicating. By August, Niall had sent through his list of demands, the principal of which was to rule Tyrconnell like his grandfather Calvagh. Docwra promised to obtain Niall a royal grant of Tyrconnell if he served against his cousin.

In September, Hugh Roe left Ulster for a raid in Thomond, entrusting Niall to besiege Derry. (Note: Hugh Roe had previously entrusted Niall to besiege Derry in June 1600, when he left Ulster to plunder south Connacht and north Munster.) While Hugh Roe was in Ballymote, Niall and his followers murdered Niall's uncle Neachtan in a drunken rage. Neachtan was "a man of great authority with [Hugh Roe] and all his country". Fearing Hugh Roe's revenge, Niall—alongside his three brothers and about 100 soldiers—quickly defected to the English. They joined Docwra on 3 October. Hugh Roe's supporters were aware of Niall's communication with Docwra, which forced Niall into leaving for Derry before he was fully ready. He brought over 200 men with him to Docwra, but would have brought more if not for the shortness of time. His brothers Hugh Boy, Conn Oge and Donal defected with him.

Niall was one of many disgruntled Gaelic Irish noblemen who defected on Docwra's promises, including Arthur O'Neill, Sean O'Doherty and Cahir O'Doherty.

=== Battle of Lifford ===
Accompanied by royal forces, Niall marched to Lifford's castle, which had been left in the control of Hugh Roe's tanist and younger brother Rory. The Crown loyalists successfully stormed Lifford on 9 October. Hugh Roe was shocked at Niall's betrayal and rushed back to Ulster. The confederates tried in vain to retake Lifford from Niall, with minor skirmishes occurring around the castle. Hugh Roe lost about 20 men on 17 October.

The siege climaxed in the Battle of Lifford on 24 October, when Hugh Roe attacked the castle. Niall retaliated by leading a cavalry charge of mixed Irish and English forces out to battle. During the battle, Niall fatally wounded Hugh Roe's younger brother Manus in the shoulder. Rory and Niall subsequently engaged in single combat against each other, though both men survived the battle. Docwra was pleased that the feud between Niall and Hugh Roe had been exacerbated, as it pushed Niall further into opposition with the confederacy. He wrote: "I think there needeth no better hostages for his fidelity, for he hath slain with his own hands (in fight and open view of our men that saw him) [Hugh Roe]'s second brother, and there have passed beside many arguments of extreme and irreconcible hatred between them." By December 1600, Hugh Roe had put a price of £300 on Niall's head. Apparently Niall later made efforts to return to the Irish confederacy, but this was obviously difficult due to his murder of Manus.

From Lifford, Niall and his brothers made several raids into Tír Eoghain, and captured Newtown from the O'Neills. Men, women and children were killed, and 500 cows were pillaged and taken back to Lifford.

=== Partnership with royal forces ===
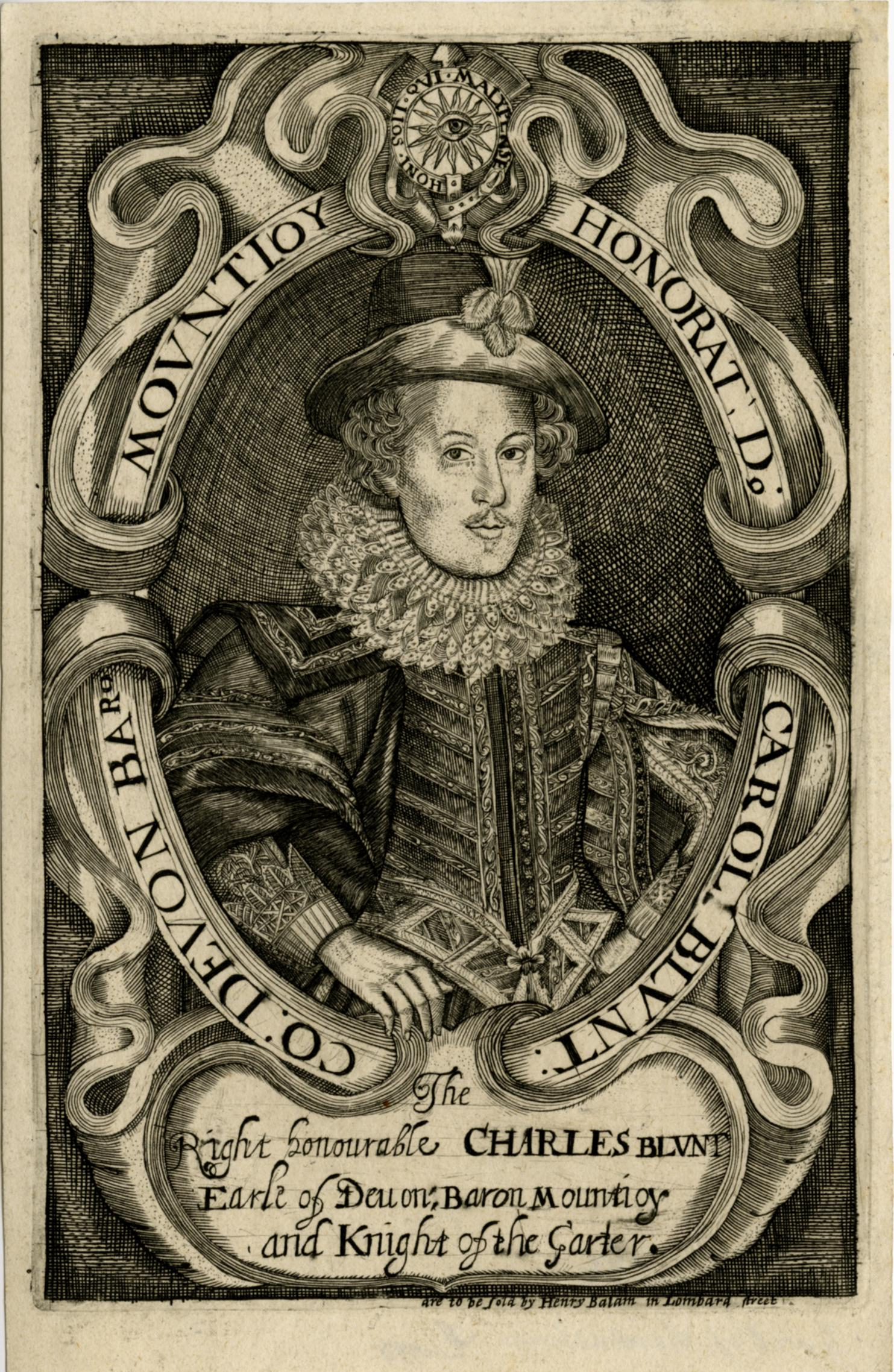
Niall quarreled with Lord Deputy Charles Blount, 8th Baron Mountjoy, over land rights in Tyrconnell.

Nicknamed "the Queen's O'Donnell", Niall was unrivalled in his use of Ireland's terrain as part of guerilla warfare. With the aid of both his military skill and his team of Irish spies, the royal army mobilised across Tyrconnell and north-west Ulster. He also provided intel on Hugh Roe's tactics. By Docwra's admission, Niall's service was crucial. After the war, he wrote "I must confess a truth, all by the help and advice of Neal Garbh and his followers, and the other Irish that came in with Sir Arthur O'Neale, without whose intelligence and guidance little or nothing could have been done of ourselves". Docwra nevertheless took the precaution of placing a spy into Niall's entourage. Niall spoke broken English, and during his conversations with Docwra he required English soldier Humphrey Willis to act as interpreter.

In December 1600, Niall travelled to Dublin to meet Lord Deputy Charles Blount, 8th Baron Mountjoy. Niall was granted a custodium of Tyrconnell (excepting Ballyshannon and the fishery of the Erne) on 18 March 1601, which also recognised him as the O'Donnell clan chief. To his dismay, this excluded Inishowen (a peninsula in Tyrconnell), which Mountjoy granted to loyalist Cahir O'Doherty. Traditionally the O'Donnell clan owned Inishowen and rented it to the O'Doherty clan in return for black rents. Docwra quoted Niall as saying "Inishowen is mine and were there but one cow in the country that cow would I take and use it as my own." To placate him, Docwra gave Niall control of MacSweeney's country. When Niall returned to Derry in April, his relationship with Docwra was beginning to worsen.

In April 1601, Hugh Roe unexpectedly marched on Niall, forcing him to temporarily retreat to Derry. On 26 May, upon hearing that Tyrone was near Lifford, Niall put together a small group of both Irish and English soldiers and attacked Tyrone's larger army. Niall's forces killed 100 of Tyrone's men, and chased Tyrone for miles.

=== Siege of Donegal ===
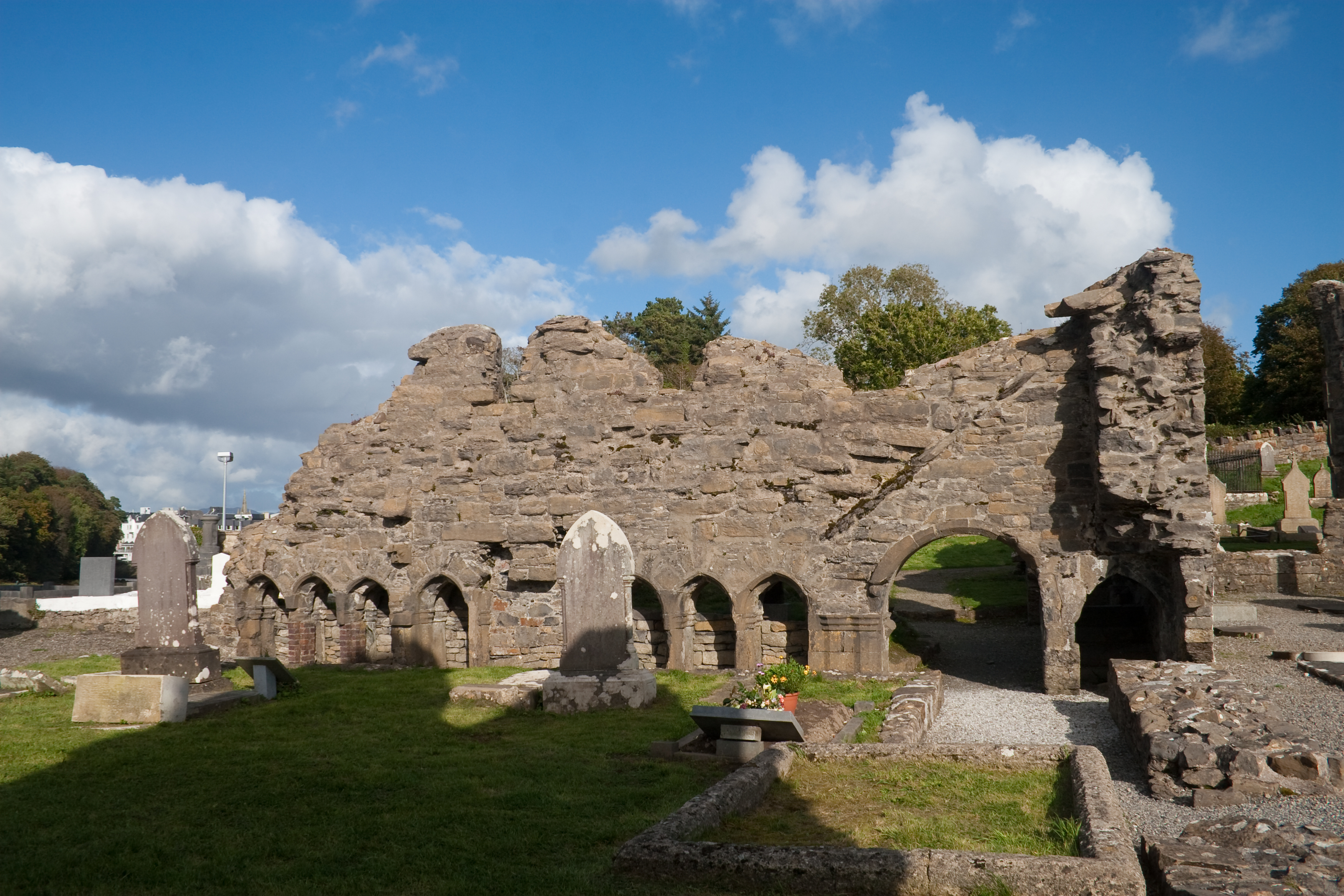
The ruins of Donegal Abbey in 2013

Niall captured Donegal on 31 July, which enabled the loyalists to attack nearby Ballyshannon. In particular he captured the Franciscan priory—Donegal Abbey—which housed a confederate munition store consisting of "a great chamber full of calivers and muskets, a loft full of pikes, and three of powder, containing by estimation two hundred barrels". His hold over Donegal virtually prevented Hugh Roe from entering Tyrconnell, and a month-long siege ensued. It came to a head on 19 September when a gunpowder explosion in the store caused a raging fire in the abbey. Hugh Roe hurriedly ordered his men to attack, leading to a chaotic engagement amidst the burning abbey. It appeared that Niall would be defeated, but the loyalist forces held out until reinforcements from Docwra arrived, forcing Hugh Roe to retreat. Many of Niall's troops were killed during the battle; his younger brother Conn Oge was fatally injured. Niall later retreated to Magherabeg Friary.

Around this time, Docwra received "many informations against" Niall, but confessed that Niall that "behaved himself deservingly," and "had many of his men slain at the siege of Kinsale, and among the rest a brother of his own". Niall was so unsettled by the siege that, with Docwra's permission, he began negotiating with Hugh Roe. He requested to be made tanist of Tyrconnell, to reunite with Nuala, and to "have the present lordship of all the country between Bearnas Mór and Inishowen". However, Niall's conditions (which stated "that [Hugh Roe] and [Niall] should be bound and sworn never to come in sight of one another") were so numerous that Hugh Roe discarded negotiations.

=== De facto ruler of Tyrconnell ===
Niall's cooperation with the government played a key role in weakening Hugh Roe's forces. On 21 September 1601, the 4th Spanish Armada landed at the southern port town of Kinsale to assist the Irish confederacy. Shortly afterwards, Hugh Roe left Ulster and began a long march to Kinsale to unite with the Spanish. By this time, Niall and Docwra had essentially conquered Tyrconnell and left Hugh Roe with no home to return to. England's victory at the Siege of Kinsale crushed the confederacy. Hugh Roe left Ireland in December to seek secure further Spanish reinforcements from Philip III, leaving Rory as acting chief. By 1602, Niall held Tyrconnell and was effectively the ruler of Tyrconnell.

In March 1602, Niall was knighted by Mountjoy. Niall took Ballyshannon from Rory and Brian Oge O'Rourke on 25 March. Subsequently Donough McSweeney Banagh submitted to Niall and the Crown, allowing Niall to take Killybegs. In August he provisioned Mountjoy at Augher. He also secured Castlederg, destroyed Enniskillen and garrisoned the monasteries of Devenish and Lisgoole. However, arguments over pay and the division of plundered goods left to a major rift between Niall and Docwra, and by end of the year Niall refused to speak with him. In response, Docwra wrote to Dublin accusing Niall of plotting with Tyrone and Hugh Roe. Given the animosity between Niall and the confederacy leaders, this was clearly a ploy. It is possible that Docwra, not well-regarded as a military strategist, was jealous of the plaudits Niall received for his military assistance. Additionally, Niall's fall from grace might allow Docwra to obtain his own grant to parts of Tyrconnell. Niall captured Caffar Óg O'Donnell in 1603.

== Post-war (1603–1607) ==
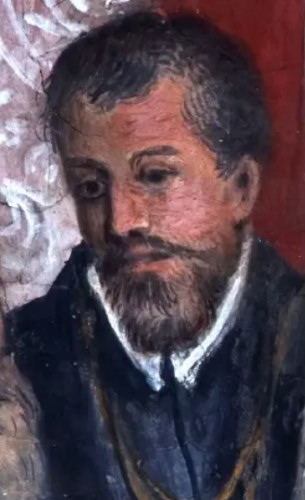
Niall's cousin Rory O'Donnell, 1st Earl of Tyrconnell, was granted most of Tyrconnell's land in 1603.

Following the confederates' defeat at Kinsale, the Crown's army swept the country, destroying crops and livestock in Ulster. Hugh Roe died of a sudden illness in Simancas in August 1602, and Rory surrendered to the Crown in January 1603. The Treaty of Mellifont, signed by Tyrone and Mountjoy on 30 March 1603, ended the Nine Years' War.

Although Niall was indispensable to the royal army during the war, Mountjoy favoured Rory as a successor to Hugh Roe. Mountjoy observed "how notable an instrument [Rory] may be made to bridle Sir Niall Garbh, whose insolence has grown intolerable". Niall correctly assumed that the government would pit Rory against him in a power struggle for Tyrconnell. He responded by seizing Rory's cattle, and he may have even tried to murder Rory.

Niall was ordered by the Irish Privy Council to come to Dublin to receive a patent for Tyrconnell. He disobeyed the order and instead went to Kilmacrennan where that April he had himself traditionally inaugurated as O'Donnell clan chief. (Note: On 5 April, Docwra wrote that Niall "has now created himself O'Donell after the Irish fashion, contrary to the advice of his counsellors, that it would be offensive to the State.") He was the last of the O'Donnell clan to be inaugurated. His chieftainship was not recognised by the Irish scribes known as the Four Masters, who supported Hugh Roe's branch of the O'Donnell clan.

Mountjoy was now weary of Niall's insubordinate behaviour. Niall was arrested, on Mountjoy's orders, in Derry. Niall justified his inauguration by pointing out to Docwra that "you know the whole country of Tyrconnell was long since promised me, and many services that I have done, that I think have deserved it, but I saw that I was neglected, and therefore I have righted myself, by taking the cattle, and people, that were my own, and to prevent others, have made myself O'Donnell; now by this means the country is sure unto me". After three days in confinement, Niall escaped to a thick wood where he assembled his forces. Rory and Docwra pursued him, capturing his cattle and starving or killing many of his followers. Niall eventually gave himself up and was allowed to proceed to London "to solicit pardon for his offences, and to obtain the reward for his service and aid to the crown of England". Docwra advised on Niall's execution or imprisonment, but Niall still had several supporters at court. On 30 May, Niall sailed to Holyhead with Mountjoy and Tyrone on their journey to meet Elizabeth I's newly-crowned successor James I.

Niall's actions against the state damaged his relations with the government. Rory was raised to the peerage as 1st Earl of Tyrconnell—effectively the lordship—and granted ownership of the majority of Tyrconnell. Niall was granted 13,000 acres of land in east Tyrconnell which he owned prior to the outbreak of war. The Crown reserved the right to build further castles in Tyrconnell. The division of land failed to satisfy either Niall or Rory. Rory called Lifford "the only jewel" which he had. Niall returned to Tyrconnell with a strong feeling of betrayal. He refused to register his land grant (though he retained the land in practice). For the next few years, he continued his vendetta with Tyrone and Rory and engaged in land disputes with both men.

"If he had known they would have used him thus, he would have set them all on work so as they never were in their lives."

— words attributed to Niall Garbh O'Donnell by Thomas Ridgeway, 3 July 1608

By 1604, Niall's power had grown to the extent that Rory was forced to flee to the Pale. In 1605, Lord Deputy Arthur Chichester attempted to reconcile land disputes in Ulster; he awarded 43 quarters of land in Glenfin and Moentacht to Niall. In August 1606, Niall deposed that Rory and Cuconnacht Maguire planned to seize royal garrisons in northern Ulster. In December, Chichester bound Niall and Rory in recognizances to accept his decision regarding their land rights dispute. Relations between the cousins became sufficiently friendly enough that Niall served under Rory for the government at the siege of Doe Castle in March 1607, where he was seriously wounded fighting against Cathbhar Oge O'Donnell.

In September 1607, due to increased hostility by the government towards former confederacy members, Rory and Tyrone left Ireland for continental Europe in what as known as the Flight of the Earls. During a meeting in Dublin in November, Chichester mentioned to Niall the possibility of transferring ownership of Inishowen to him, since O'Doherty had fallen out of favour with the administration. This restored Niall's hopes of seizing more land in Tyrconnell. However, his claims were ignored, and he apparently refused the title Baron of Lifford. By 1608 he was heavily in debt.

== Rebellion, trial and death (1608–1626) ==
=== O'Doherty's rebellion ===
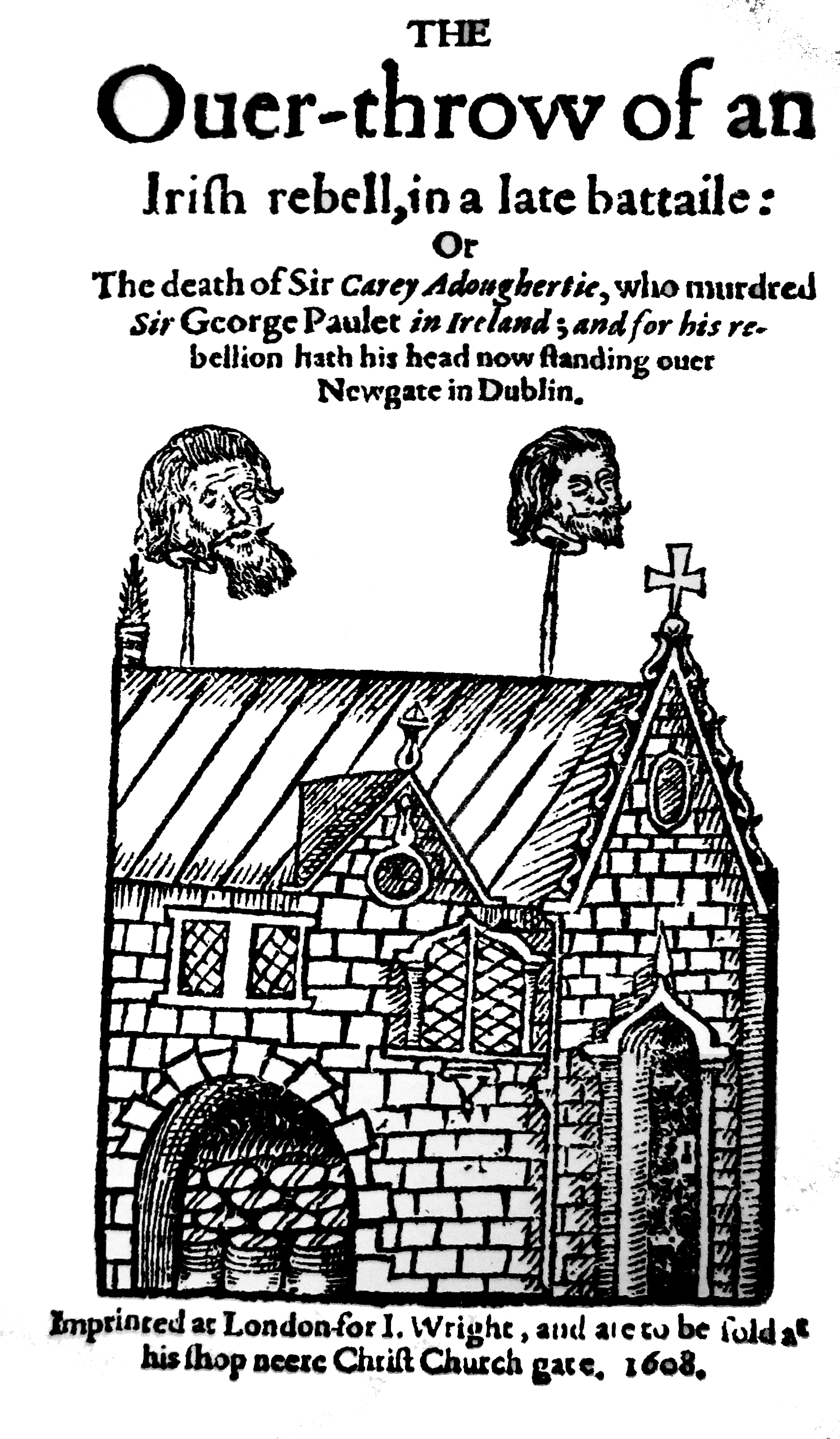
Pamphlet displaying the heads of Irish rebels Phelim Reagh MacDavitt (left) and Cahir O'Doherty (right)

Cahir O'Doherty was frustrated with his treatment by Derry's governor George Paulet, and in early 1608, it appears Niall encouraged him to launch a rebellion against the Crown. O'Doherty led a force of rebels in burning Derry on 19 April, but Niall stayed aloof from the rebellion. He hoped to be awarded Inishowen in the event of a failed rebellion, as mentioned by Chichester. Niall rejected meetings with the government, started bargaining with them over the price of his assistance, and demanded recognition as the rightful Lord of Tyrconnell. When royal forces arrived in the region in late May, Niall offered assistance in catching O'Doherty. However, it appears that he maintained correspondence with O'Doherty and warned the rebels of the royal army's movements. The government quickly grew suspicious of Niall.

Niall was accused by his two brothers, Hugh Boye and Donal, with instigating O'Doherty's rebellion. His mother-in-law Iníon Dubh included Hugh Boye and Donal, as well as Niall's 17-year-old son Naghtan, as co-conspirators. Niall protested his loyalty, but under protection from Treasurer Thomas Ridgeway, 1st Earl of Londonderry, he and his two brothers were arrested in June and brought to Dublin on the Tramontana (ironically the same pinnace which brought him to Holyhead). Niall was charged on six counts of treason and imprisoned in Dublin Castle. Subsequently, many of O'Doherty's supporters (including O'Doherty's wife) implicated Niall in the rebellion. O'Doherty was later shot and killed at the Battle of Kilmacrennan on 5 July.

=== Trial and death ===
Attorney-General for Ireland John Davies, accumulated proof of Niall's correspondence with O'Doherty, but it was unclear whether Niall's guilt was condoned by his protection. On 1 July 1608 Niall was examined before the council and committed to the castle. Prior to his trial, he made numerous unsuccessful attempts to escape his confinement.

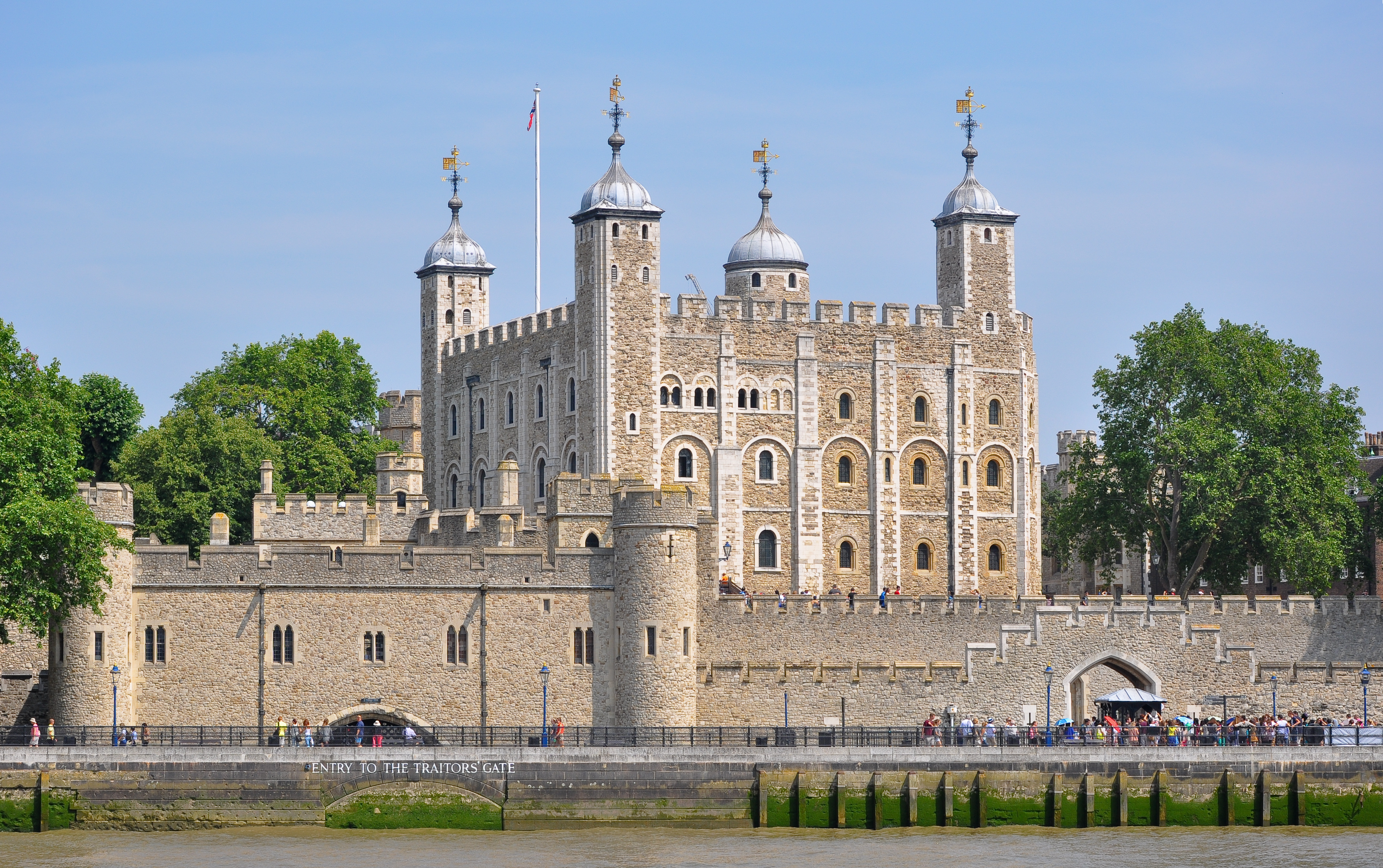
Niall died during imprisonment in the Tower of London.

Niall was finally brought to trial in Dublin in June 1609. On 3 August, O'Doherty's co-conspirator Phelim Reagh MacDavitt testified that Niall and O'Doherty met two or three nights prior to the burning of Derry, and that Niall persuaded O'Doherty to "burn the town and massacre the people". The day after the attack, Niall sent representatives to take a share of the spoils from Derry. Additionally, Niall agreed to pass on intel on the location of government forces. He promised to join O'Doherty in open rebellion once his men received arms, and also proposed kidnapping the governor of Ballyshannon.

MacDavitt's accusations were extremely damning. The local jury, all Irish men from Donegal, were under considerable pressure from the government to convict, and were confined for several days without food. However, they feared retribution from Niall's supporters and threats of excommunication from the Catholic clergy. After three days, Davies realised that the jury would acquit Niall. "Pretending that he had more evidence to give for the king, but that he found the jury so weak with long fasting that they were not able to attend the service," Davies discharged them before they gave their verdict.

In October 1609, both Niall and Naghtan were committed to the Tower of London. In 1613, Niall's request that his rents be devoted to supporting his surviving sister and to the schooling of his children was supported by Chichester. Niall remained in the Tower for the rest of his life, dying there in 1626, aged 57.

== Family and issue ==
Sometime before Niall's submission to Hugh Roe in 1592, he married Nuala O'Donnell, his first cousin once-removed. Niall and Nuala had at least two children, Naghtan and Manus. (Note: According to Robert Dunlop, Nuala had a daughter named Grania. Dunlop states that Grania accompanied Nuala on the Flight of the Earls, then returned to England in 1617 to petition for a provision of Niall's estate. Eunan O'Donnell states that Naghtan, Manus and Grania were all children of Niall and Nuala. Conversely, Casway believes Nuala had no children.) When Niall defected from the confederacy in 1600, Nuala separated from him. In 1602 he was reportedly contemplating a marriage to the widow of Arthur O'Neill, who was also the sister of the late Hugh Maguire. Whether or not Niall remarried, it appears he had more than two children. The historian George Hill states that Naghtan had two younger brothers, and Walsh states that it is unlikely that Niall remained without a partner until his arrest in 1608. By 1607, Nuala was living with her brother Rory. She took part in the Flight of the Earls and died in the Spanish Netherlands circa 1630.

Naghtan, Niall's eldest son, was born around 1591. He was handed over to Docwra in 1600 as a surety for his father's loyalism. Described as "a boy of an active spirit, and yet much inclined to his book", Naghtan enrolled at St John's College, Oxford in January 1603, at the charge of the Earl of Devonshire. He was given the English name "Hector". He was then sent to Trinity College Dublin, whence he was transferred to Dublin Castle. Naghtan disappears from records after 1623; it is assumed that he died in the Tower of London. Sir Allen Apsley noted that Naghtan apparently never committed any offence.

Niall's son Manus served as a colonel under Owen Roe O'Neill in the Irish Confederate Wars. He died at the Battle of Benburb in 1646. The O'Donel baronets of Newport, County Mayo descend from Manus's son Rory.

The Austrian and Spanish lines of the O'Donnell family descend from Niall's brother Conn Oge.

=== Hugh Roe's killing of child ===
A report by Docwra, dated February 1601, describes Hugh Roe murdering Niall and Nuala's four-year-old child in a furious reaction to Niall's betrayal:

"[Hugh Roe] hath of late hanged many of good account . . . he dasht owt the brains of Neil Garve's childe (of [four] yeares olde) againste a post, beinge in the mother's custody, his owne naturall sister."

This report is contentious among historians. Docwra's biographer John McGurk acknowledges that the report's truthfulness is uncertain. McGurk points out that Docwra's "blunt" personality would indicate that he reported current affairs accurately, though it is unclear where Docwra received this intelligence. McGurk also acknowledges that infanticide was a feature of warfare in the early modern period. Historian Hiram Morgan notes that since this is a contemporary account, it should not be dismissed out of hand.

== Character and legacy ==
Niall's career is dominated by his desire to take power in Tyrconnell. A bardic poet wrote a poem on Niall's ambition to become Lord of Tyrconnell:

Original Irish	English translation
Do ba neimní re Niall Garbh crínad a alt df[h]iaclaib feól-arm go tarrachtain tíre a sean df[h]ath-bertaibh gríbhe Gaoidheal.	Niall Garbh little cared if his limbs were chopped by the teeth of weapons, provided only he saved his forbears' land with skilful deeds of a chief of the Gaedhil.

Of the commanders working for the Crown, Niall was one of the most zealous and aggressive in attacking Irish civilians during his raids. Historian John Lynch blamed Niall for allowing the execution of the elderly bishop of Derry, Redmond O'Gallagher. He possessed much personal bravery and military skill, but had poor judgement in political matters. He also displayed naivety in his dealings with the government. According to Clavin, Niall was "first and foremost a warrior" and not suited to the role of a landlord. Niall ultimately lived to regret joining the loyalist camp.

Due to Niall's betrayal of both Gaelic Ireland and the Crown, contemporary sources on both sides are somewhat biased again him. Docwra praised Niall's military value to the royal army, but nonetheless wrote that he was "proud, valiant, miserable, tyrannous, unnecessarily covetous, without any knowledge of God, or almost any civility". Walsh points out that Docwra was prejudiced against Irish Catholics and would have described any Irishman in this manner. Seventeenth-century Irish writer Philip O'Sullivan Beare called Niall "a man of great spirit and daring, skilled in military matters". He references that, despite working for the Protestant Crown, Niall "always retained the Catholic faith and kept aloof from heretical rites". Indeed, a condition of Niall's defection was a guarantee of liberty of conscience for himself and his followers. Niall is described by Lughaidh Ó Cléirigh, Hugh Roe's biographer, as "a violent man, hasty, austere, since he was spiteful, vindictive, with the venom of a serpent, with the impetuosity of a lion." However, he adds that Niall "was a hero in valour, and brave".

John O'Donovan wrote: "The character of Niall Garv has been generally painted in unfavourable colours, because of his hostility to Hugh Roe, and the part which he took against him in conjunction with the English. It is true that history does not present a more chivalrous and devoted Irishman than Hugh Roe proved himself to be during his short and eventful career... we should recollect that Niall had the prior title, and that doubtless he was nurtured in feelings of hostility to what his own immediate family must have considered an unjust usurpation."

Irish nationalist historians represent Niall as having betrayed Gaelic Ireland (ironically, it was his insistence on maintaining the Gaelic structure of lordship which led to his incarceration). He has been compared to Dermot MacMurrough, the medieval King of Leinster who incited the Anglo-Norman invasion of Ireland. The Franciscan Donagh Mooney, who knew Hugh Roe personally, had a particularly negative view of Niall. English civil servants nevertheless recognised Niall's importance to the English victory in the Nine Years' War.
