= Dominican Annals of Roscommon =

Irish annals covering the years 1163 to 1314

- Original title: Annales Dominicani de Roscoman
- Language: Latin
- Publication place: Ireland

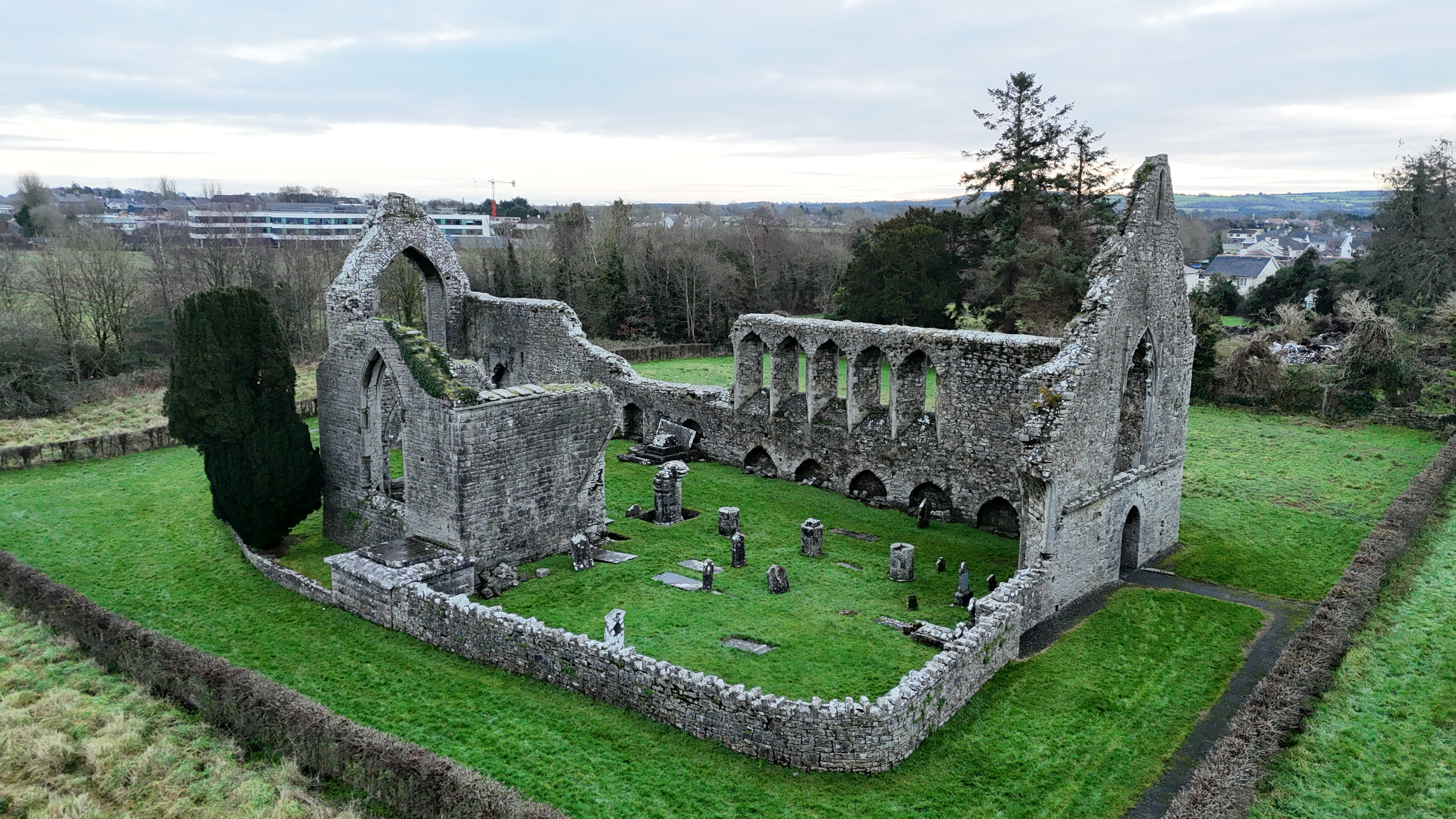
Ruins of Roscommon Dominican Priory

The Dominican Annals of Roscommon (Latin: Annales Dominicani de Roscoman) is an Irish annals, covering events, mainly in Connacht and its neighbouring regions, from 1163 to 1314, spanning the period of the Anglo-Norman invasion of Ireland and the early part of English rule in Ireland. It also mentions some matters to do with the Dominicans, church matters in general, and political relations with England.

It was compiled in Latin in Roscommon Dominican Priory (Blackfriars). The abbey was founded by and supported by the Ó Conchobhair (O'Connor) kings of Connacht. Occasional examples of pro-O'Connor bias are noted: for example, the blinding of Muirchertach Ua Conchobair by his brother, the king Ruaidrí Ua Conchobair, is not mentioned, and when the 1193 plundering of the monastery on Inchcleraun is mentioned, it is attributed to Gilbert de Lacy, whereas the Annals of the Four Masters mention that Conchobar Maenmaige Ua Conchobair was also responsible.

The largest part of the Annals are attributed to Odo O'Hanmerech (d. 1306).

The annals survive in a seventeenth-century manuscript that once belonged to James Ware.

Among its notable entries are a mention of the drying-up of the River Galvia, apparently an early name for the Corrib.

== See also ==
- Irish annals
