= Tyrconnell =

400s–1607 kingdom of Gaelic Ireland

Tyrconnell Tír Chonaill (Irish)
- 5th century–1607
- Coat of arms

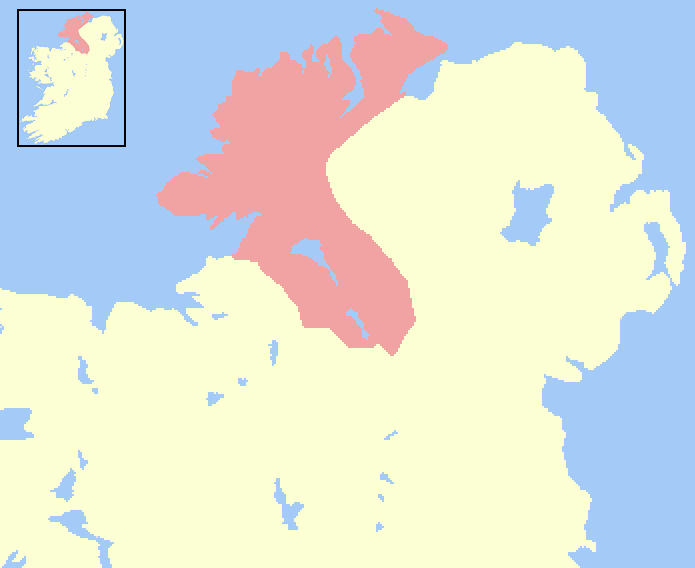
- Tyrconnell in the middle of the 15th century
- Status: Túatha of Ailech (until 1185)
- Capital: Kilmacrennan (royal inaugurations) and Donegal Castle (later seat of O'Donnell dynasty)
- Common languages: Irish
- Government: Elective monarchy
- King / Chief
  - d. 464: Conall Gulban (first)
  - 1602–1607: Rory O'Donnell, 1st Earl of Tyrconnell (last)
- History
  - Established: 5th century
  - Disestablished: 1607
| Preceded by | Succeeded by |
| Ailech | Kingdom of Ireland |
- Today part of: Ireland

Tyrconnell (Irish: Tír Chonaill, meaning 'Land of Conall'), also spelled Tirconnell and Tirconaill, was a kingdom of Gaelic Ireland. It is associated geographically with present-day County Donegal, which was officially named County Tirconaill between 1922 and 1927. At times it also included parts of County Fermanagh, County Sligo, County Leitrim, County Tyrone and County Londonderry at its greatest extent. The kingdom represented the core homeland of the Cenél Conaill people of the Northern Uí Néill and although they ruled, there were smaller groups of other Gaels in the area.

From the 5th century founding of Cenél Conaill, the tuatha was a sub-unit of the larger kingdom of Ailech, along with their Cenél nEógain cousins, fellow descendants of Niall of the Nine Hostages. Their initial ascent had coincided with the decline of the Ulaid, whose kingdom of Ulster receded to the north-east coast. In the 12th century the kingdom of Ailech split into two sovereign territories and Cenél Conaill became Tír Chonaill under the Ó Domhnaill (O'Donnell) clan. It was the location of fighting during the Nine Years' War (Ireland) at the end of the 16th century. It continued to exist until the 17th century when it was incorporated into the English-ruled Kingdom of Ireland following the Flight of the Earls.

== Geography ==
Tyrconnell lay in the area now more commonly referred to as County Donegal, although the kingdom and later principality of Tyrconnell was larger than that, including parts of present-day counties Sligo, Leitrim, Tyrone, Fermanagh and a southern part of Londonderry. According to Geoffrey Keating, by the 16th century encompassed the baronies of Carbury (Cairbre, in County Sligo), Rosclogher (Dartrighe, in County Leitrim), and Magheraboy (Machaire Bui, mainly Toorah or Tuath Ratha) and Firlurg (Lorg, in County Fermanagh).

== Associated aristocracy ==
Although the elective Chieftaincy of O'Donnell is extinct since the abolition of Tanistry and Brehon Law, the Chief of the Name is known as The O'Donnell of Tyrconnell, as recognised by the Chief Herald of Ireland, as the legitimate successor in a putative sequence of Chiefs of the Name (by male primogeniture), and would default to the Duke of Tetuan in Spain in succession to the current Chief, a Franciscan priest, who has no eligible progeny. However, following advice by the Attorney General in 2003, the Genealogical Office discontinued the practice of recognising Chiefs of the Name. The Hereditary Seneschal of Tyrconnell (currently vested in a living O'Donnell, who was already ennobled as a Knight of Malta, and who inherited the Seneschalship from his father), survives under the auspices of the Hereditary Great Seneschal or Lord High Steward of Ireland, currently Charles Chetwynd-Talbot, 22nd Earl of Shrewsbury, senior direct descendant of George Carpenter, 2nd Earl of Tyrconnell (of the 4th creation), and senior kin of Richard Talbot, Duke of Tyrconnel.

== Diocese of Raphoe ==
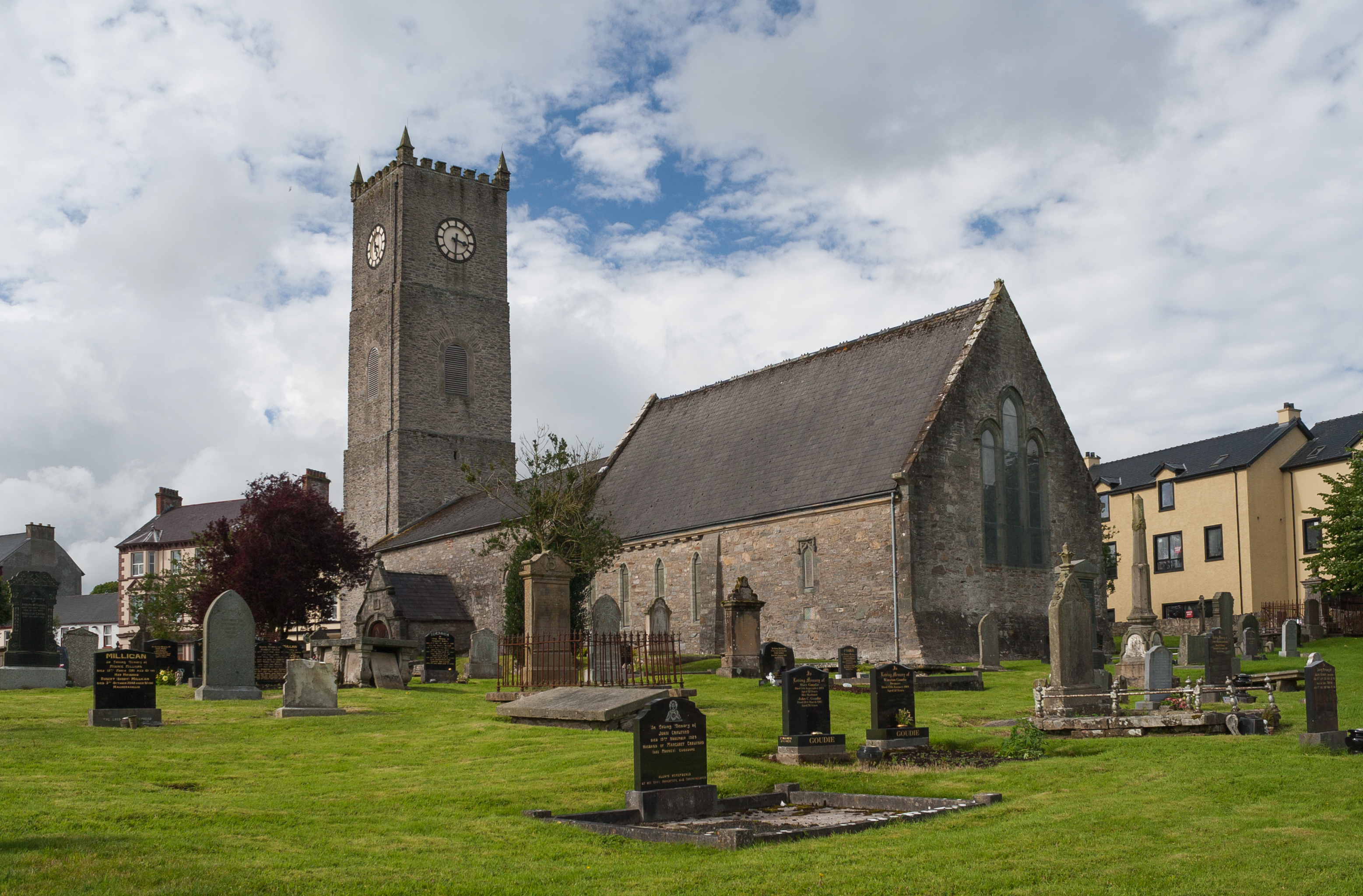
St. Eunan's Cathedral was the seat of the Bishop of Raphoe, which formed the religious center of Tyrconnell.

The religion which predominated at an official level in Tyrconnell was Catholic Christianity. The territory of Tyrconnell was associated with the Diocese of Raphoe under the Bishop of Raphoe, which had been formed in 1111. It was mentioned at the Synod of Ráth Breasail and covered Tír Conaill. Inis Eogain is in the Diocese of Derry. Indeed, the Christian religion was of particular significance to the O'Donnell rulers of Tyrconnell, as their kinsman St. Colm Cille (also known as St. Columba), born at Conwal and Leck, was regarded as one of the three patron saints of Ireland. Their founder and namesake of the kingdom, Conall Gulban, had been the first nobleman converted by St. Patrick. Indeed, they later took up the symbol of the cross as part of one of their heraldic identifiers and adopted the motto in hoc signo vinces.

== History ==
In 1561, Hugh McManus O'Donnell seized power from Calvagh O'Donnell via an alliance with Shane O'Neill. Upon Calvagh's death in 1566, Hugh McManus officially acceded as Lord of Tyrconnell under brehon law.

Hugh McManus's eldest son, Hugh Roe O'Donnell, was born in 1572. Hugh Roe was fostered by Conn O'Donnell.

=== 1580–1592 succession dispute ===
Tyrconnell's long-running succession dispute began in October 1580. Conn had a strong claim to the lordship as his father Calvagh was a prior ruler of Tyrconnell. Hugh Roe was removed from Conn's care when he turned hostile towards the ruling O'Donnells in 1581; Conn died two years later and Hugh Roe's succession seemed assured. Nevertheless, Conn's sons, particularly Niall Garve, looked to the English government as a means of restoring their branch of the family to power. By 1587, Hugh Roe was widely considered to be his father's most likely successor and was tanist of the O'Donnell clan.

==== Kidnapping of Hugh Roe ====
By 1587, Hugh Roe was betrothed to the Earl of Tyrone's daughter Rose. Lord Deputy John Perrot feared that the emergence of a powerful O'Neill-O'Donnell alliance, which would be cemented by Hugh Roe's marriage to Rose, would threaten English control over Ulster. Perrot ordered young O'Donnell's kidnapping in 1587 in hopes of destroying this alliance. O'Donnell was imprisoned in Dublin Castle, along with two MacShanes, Art and Henry. Tyrone lobbied for O'Donnell's release, describing the ordeal as "the most prejudice that might happen unto me".

Hugh McManus's premature senility and Hugh Roe's imprisonment exacerbated the succession dispute. Three of Conn's sons were violently killed in the conflict. Hugh McManus's wife, Iníon Dubh effectively took over Tyrconnell and ruled in her husband's name. She pushed successfully for Hugh Roe to become her husband's successor by spreading the Aodh Eangach prophecy and by directing her Redshanks to kill any challengers. Hugh MacEdegany, a reputed illegitimate son of Calvagh O'Donnell, was the first major challenger. He was assassinated on Iníon Dubh's orders during a visit to her residence, Mongavlin Castle, in May 1588, leaving Niall Garve as head of the "MacCalvagh" branch.

==== Appointment of administrators ====
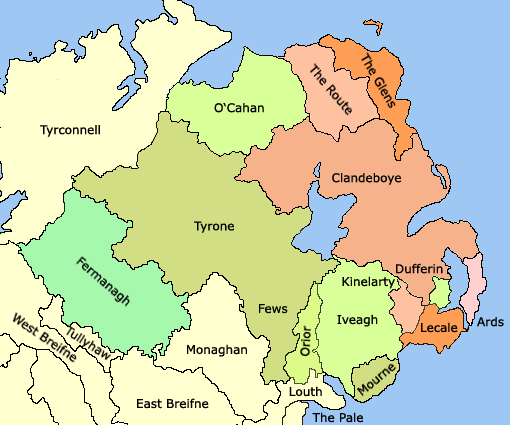
Map of Ulster's Gaelic kingdoms in the 16th century

Further disruptions developed as the government appointed various administrators in Tyrconnell who ransacked and pillaged the kingdom. Perrot appointed William Mostian as Sheriff of Tyrconnell—he quickly carried out eight cattle raids, ransacking Donegal Abbey and murdering its guardian. Later the same year, FitzWilliam gave Captain John Connill charge of Tyrconnell after being bribed with two Spanish gold chains. Connill assisted the opponents of the ruling O'Donnells. He was later joined by Captain Humphrey Willis and two hundred soldiers. At one point Connill befriended then captured Hugh McManus, but he was freed by Niall Garve. Another brutal administrator was Captain Bowen, a notorious torturer who fried the soles of his victims' feet. This chaos created mass resentment towards the English government.

Hugh Roe's elder half-brother Donal became the Crown's favored candidate for the chiefdom, and shortly after the Armada's shipwreck, FitzWilliam knighted and appointed Donal as Sheriff. FitzWilliam also imprisoned important Tyrconnell nobles Sean O'Doherty (Lord of Inishowen) and Eoin O'Gallagher, believing them to possess Spanish treasure from the Armada. O'Gallagher's imprisonment also had political motivations as he was a major adherent of Hugh Roe during the succession dispute. Donal made an effort to depose his father, backed by Connill's troops. Iníon Dubh, backed by her Redshanks and the clans of the Cenél Conaill who remained loyal to her husband, crushed Donal at the Battle of Doire Leathan on 3 September [N.S. 14 September] 1590.

Willis (who replaced Donal as Sheriff) and Connill exploited the ensuing chaos. They took control of western Tyrconnell and began raiding into the east, accompanied by a Captain Fuller. Their forces also ransacked southern Tyrconnell and forced many of the population to flee to the mountains.

Iníon Dubh bought off Niall Garve with a political marriage to her daughter Nuala, in an attempt to temper his hostility. By 1592, Niall Garve was in a strong position to claim Tyrconnell's lordship. Despite the continual presence of freebooting government troops, Tyrconnell's nobility remained obsessed with their succession conflict.

=== Return of Hugh Roe ===
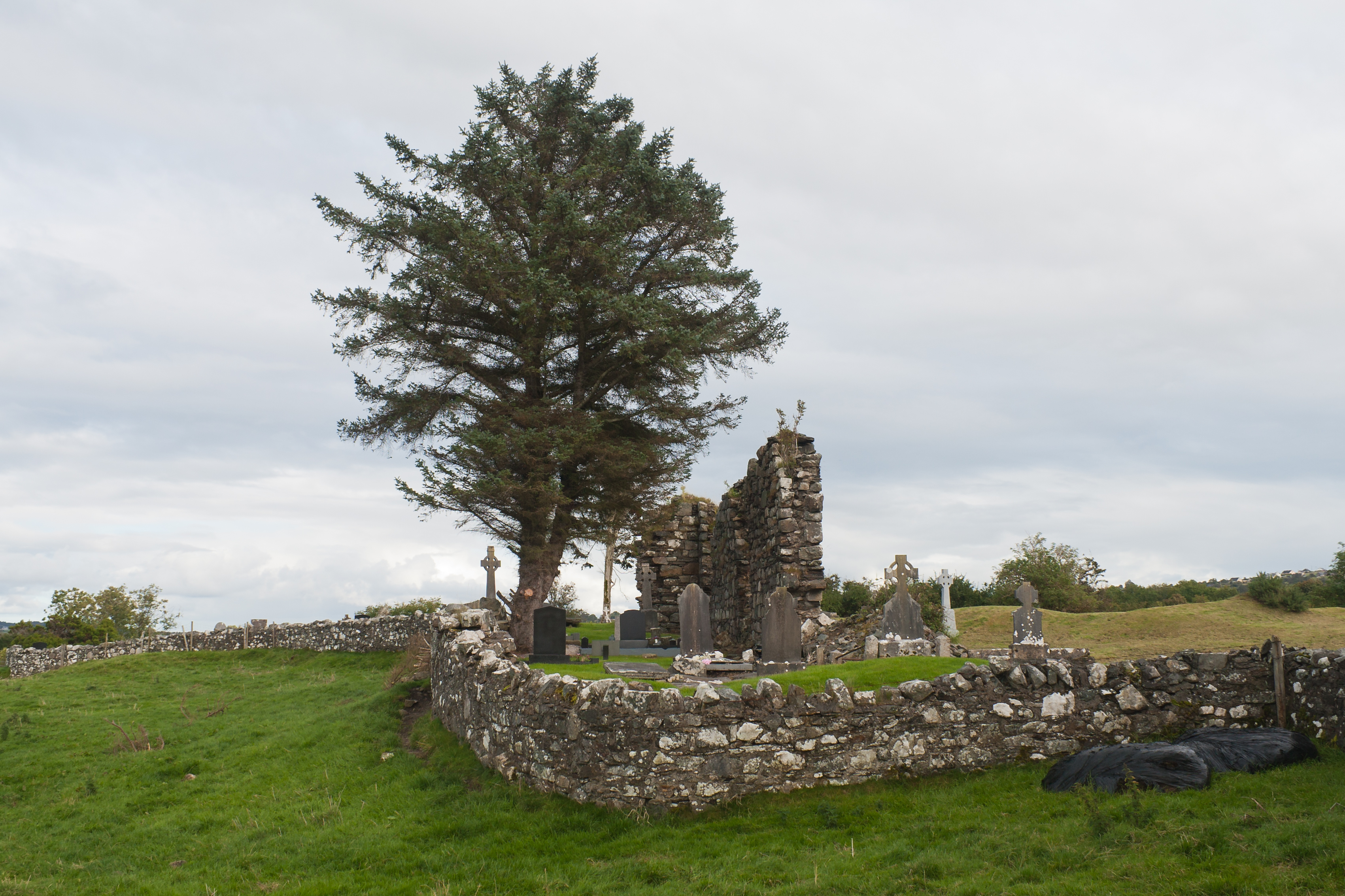
Kilmacrennan Friary in 2012, where Hugh Roe O'Donnell was inaugurated.

Hugh Roe eventually escaped prison and returned to Tyrconnell in early 1592; Tyrone had bribed officials in Dublin to secure his release. On 23 April [N.S. 3 May] 1592 at Kilmacrennan Friary, Hugh Roe was inaugurated as O'Donnell clan chief before an audience of his family and their supporters. Hugh McManus's apparently voluntary abdication was "stage-managed" by Iníon Dubh, who remained the "head of advice and counsel" in Tyrconnell. Hugh Roe's younger brother Rory was appointed as tanist.

The major surviving opponents to Hugh Roe's succession—including Niall Garve, Hugh McHugh Dubh and Sean O'Doherty—did not attend the inauguration out of protest. At the time, Niall Garve was in Dublin unsuccessfully seeking support from authorities. Tomás G. Ó Canann noted that, as Hugh Roe O'Donnell failed to secure the attendance of such a significant chunk of the Cenél Conaill, his inauguration was arguably illegitimate. With the exception of Niall Garve in 1603, Hugh Roe was the last O'Donnell clansman to be traditionally inaugurated as clan chief. Hugh Roe was the last Lord of Tyrconnell to rule undisputedly.

== See also ==
- List of rulers of Tyrconnell
- Annals of the Four Masters
- Short Annals of Tirconaill
- Annla Gearra as Proibhinse Ard Macha

== Related bibliography ==
- The History of Ireland, by Geoffrey Keating, D.D. (1580–1644), written in the years prior to 1640, and known in the original Gaelic as "Foras Feasa ar Eirinn" (le Seathrun Ceitinn), published by the Irish Texts Society, London, 1914. Volume IV. See index entry for Tír Chonaill
- O'Donnell, Francis Martin (2018). The O'Donnells of Tyrconnel – A Hidden Legacy. Academia Press. ISBN 978-1680534740.
- O'Donnell, Vincent (2007). O'Donnells of Tyrconnell – A Concise History of the O'Donnell Clan. Dalach. ISBN 978-0955562501.
- The Life of Hugh Roe O'Donnell, Prince of Tyrconnell (Beatha Aodh Ruadh O Domhnaill) by Lughaidh Ó Cléirigh. Edited by Fr. Paul Walsh and Colm Ó Lochlainn. Irish Texts Society, vol. 42. Dublin: Educational Company of Ireland, 1948 (original Gaelic manuscript in the Royal Irish Academy in Dublin).
- Annals of the Kingdom of Ireland (Annála Ríoghachta Éireann) by the Four Masters, from the earliest period to the year 1616, compiled during the period 1632–1636 by Brother Michael O’Clery, translated and edited by John O'Donovan in 1856, and re-published in 1998 by De Burca, Dublin.
- Blood Royal – From the time of Alexander the Great to Queen Elizabeth II, by Charles Mosley, published for Ruvigny Ltd., London, 2002 ISBN 0-9524229-9-9
- Vicissitudes of Families, by Sir Bernard Burke, Ulster King of Arms, published by Longman, Green, Longman and Roberts, Paternoster Row, London, 1861. (Chapter on O'Donnells, pages 125–148).
- The Fate and Fortunes of the Earls of Tyrone (Hugh O'Neill) and Tyrconnel (Rory O'Donel), their flight from Ireland and death in exile, by the Rev. C. P. Meehan, MRIA, 2nd edition, James Duffy, London, 1870.
- Erin's Blood Royal – The Gaelic Noble Dynasties of Ireland, by Peter Berresford Ellis, Constable, London, 1999, (pages 251–258 on the O'Donel, Prince of Tirconnell).
- Vanishing Kingdoms – The Irish Chiefs and their Families, by Walter J. P. Curley (former US Ambassador to Ireland), with foreword by Charles Lysaght, published by The Lilliput Press, Dublin, 2004 [ISBN 1-84351-055-3 & ISBN 1-84351-056-1]. (Chapter on O'Donnell of Tyrconnell, page 59).
- A View of the Legal Institutions, Honorary Hereditary Offices, and Feudal Baronies established in Ireland, by William Lynch, Fellow of the Society of Antiquaries, published by Longman, Rees, Orme, Brown, and Green, Paternoster Row, London, 1830 (O'Donnell: page 190, remainder to Earl's patent).
