= John Bolle =

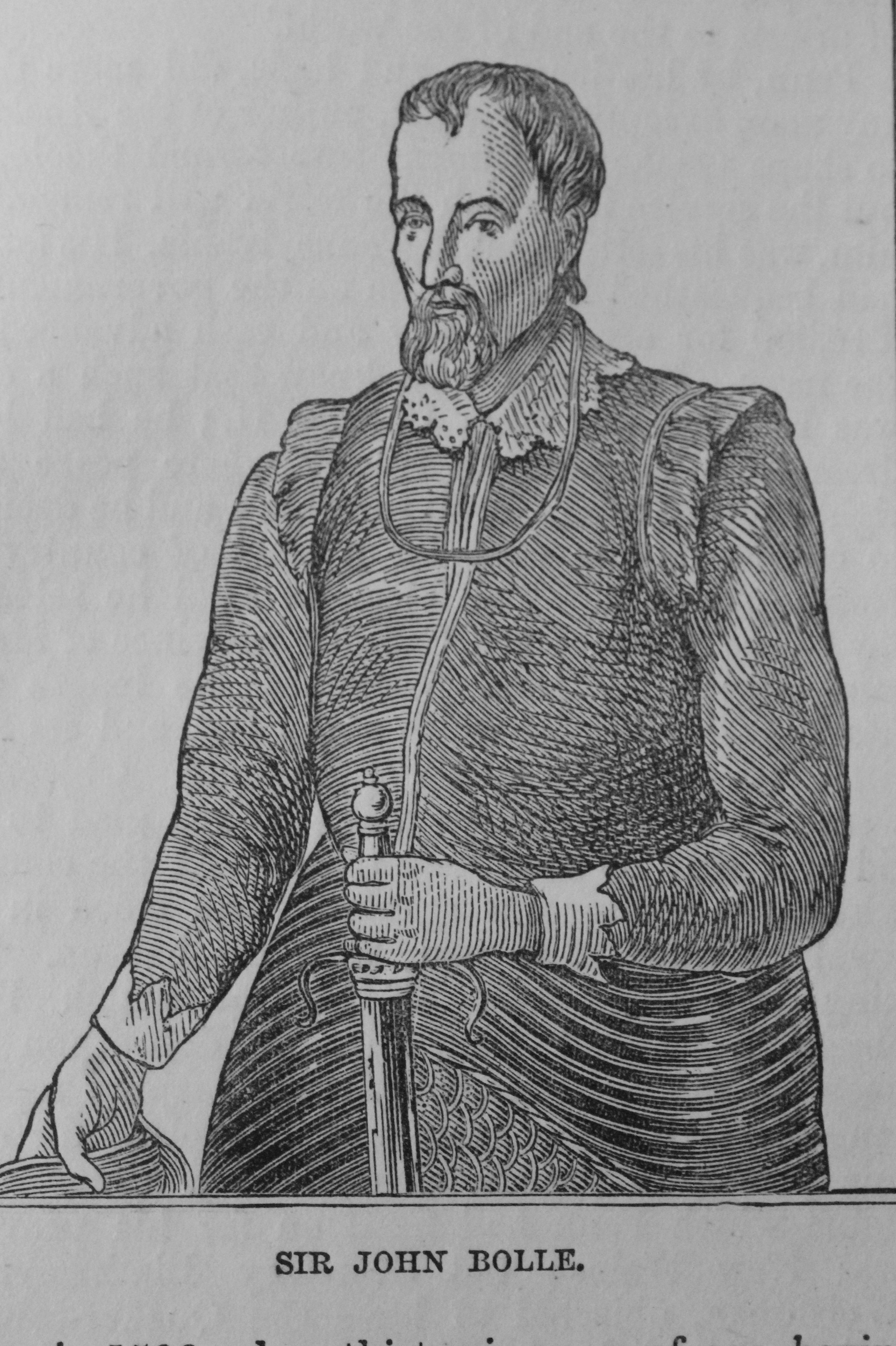
Sir John Bolle

Sir John Bolle (1560 – 3 November 1606) was a 16th century English landowner and adventurer. He is associated with one of England's oldest ghost stories.

== Life ==
He was born the son of Charles Bolle (d.1590) at Thorpe Hall between South Elkington and Louth, Lincolnshire in 1560 into the old English family of Bolle or Bolles. He was descended from Richard Bolle of Haugh.

Thorpe Hall was rebuilt in 1584. It was originally built for the Chapman family and it is unclear when it passed to the Bolle family.

In 1596 he served alongside Sir Walter Raleigh in the capture of Cádiz and was knighted. Following the attack Bolle was invited to oversee the imprisonment of a Spanish aristocrat - Donna (Lady) Leonora Oviedo. On the return journey to England she confessed her love for him and begged him to return her to Spain and marry her, but Bolle said he was already married. Donna Leonora gave him all her jewellery and gold plates plus a portrait of her wearing a green dress and he dropped her back on the Spanish coast. Queen Elizabeth confirmed his knighthood on his return from Cádiz.

In 1600 he received praise for the command of the English army in their attacks on both Donolong and Lifford in Ireland. The Earl of Essex then appointed Sir John as governor of Kinsale on the south Irish coast.

== The Green Lady of Thorpe Hall ==
Sir John hung the portrait of the Lady in a Green Dress in Thorpe Hall. He set a place for her at the dinner table each night. It is said that her love-sick spirit haunts the garden of the house at midnight.

A ballad was written relating to the event called "The Spanish Ladye's Love For An Englishman". And William Shenstone wrote the poem "Love and Honour" on the same event, but renames the Lady as "Elvira".

Bolle's eldest son Sir Charles Bolle (1592-1661), continued the tradition of leaving a space at dinner for the Green Lady.

== Family ==
Bolle was the third husband of Elizabeth Waters. Her first marriage to Nicholas Killingtree ended in divorce. Her second husband was Edward Bacon.

== Death ==
Bolle died 3 November 1606, was buried in the family vault at Haugh, Lincolnshire.

== Thorpe Hall ==
Thorpe Hall was sold by the Bolles to the Birch family in 1759. In 1825 it was purchased by Rev William Chaplin. It thereafter passed to John Lewis Fytche.

The 20 acre garden of Thorpe Hall were remodelled by Gertrude Jekyll in 1906.
