= Leabhar Oiris =

Gaelic-Irish manuscript

Leabhar Oiris (pronounced [ˌl̠ʲəuɾˠ ˈɛɾʲɪʃ]) is a Gaelic-Irish manuscript and chronicle.

An Leabhar Oiris was created by one, or more, author or authors, who drew on material in the Irish annals relating to the years 976 to 1028. It is believed to have been written in an Irish monastic scriptorium, after 976 and by 1500.
