= Annals of Nenagh =

The Annals of Nenagh are a set of Irish annals composed in Latin at the Franciscan convent of Nenagh, County Tipperary, founded c. 1254.

Its surviving portions covers the years 1336 to 1528, the majority of the brief entries concerning the 14th century. It is principally concerned with obituaries of members of the Kennedy and O'Brien families.
