= Battle of Lifford =

Battle in County Donegal during the Nine Years' War

- Part of the Nine Years' War
Date	October 1600
Location	Lifford, County Donegal
Result	English-Loyalist victory

Belligerents
(Kingdom of England) England: (Kingdom of Ireland) Loyalists	Irish alliance

Commanders and leaders
Sir John Bolle; Sir Arthur O'Neill; Niall Garve O'Donnell	Red Hugh O'Donnell

Strength
c. 500	Unknown

The Battle of Lifford was fought in County Donegal in October 1600, during the Nine Years' War in Ireland. A mixed Anglo-Irish force under Sir John Bolle and the Gaelic leaders Niall Garve O'Donnell and Sir Arthur O'Neill captured the strategic town of Lifford. A subsequent attempt to recapture it by forces led by Red Hugh O'Donnell failed.

== Background ==
Lifford was both strategically and politically important as it stands where the River Finn and Mourne meet to form the Foyle and was a traditional stronghold of the O'Donnell dynasty. Niall was a rival claimant to be chief of the O'Donnells, and his presence at Lifford strengthened his claims.

Niall had until recently fought alongside the Irish alliance, led by Hugh O'Neill, Earl of Tyrone and Niall's brother-in-law Red Hugh O'Donnell, but had changed sides following the landing of an English force at Derry the same year. Niall went over to support the English Crown with significant numbers of Gaelic troops, after he had been left in charge of the area while Red Hugh was away raiding south into Connacht. Red Hugh was outraged by Niall's defection, and in retaliation killed his young son.

== Siege and battle ==
The English forces, commanded by Sir John Bolle, captured Lifford on 8 October. As they neared the town, the thirty strong Irish garrison set fire to the castle and withdrew, but much of the small town was unscathed. Red Hugh immediately tried to recapture Lifford, but his initial attempt, which involved skirmishing around Castle Finn, left around twelve dead on each side without retaking the town. His forces then blockaded the town, hoping to starve out its garrison. Red Hugh was reinforced by Scottish redshank mercenaries hired by his mother on his behalf.

At the end of October, the garrison marched out to bring the besiegers to battle. Niall Garve led the cavalry forces and during the fighting he fought Red Hugh's younger brother Manus O'Donnell in single combat.

Although it remained under occasional pressure, the garrison at Lifford was maintained for the rest of the war.

== Aftermath ==
The success at Lifford validated Docwra's strategy of forming alliances with Gaelic leaders, which was criticised by others. Niall Garve O'Donnell's defection was one of a number in which powerful Ulster Gaelic figures switched sides, and the balance of power in Ulster gradually shifted. Over the next two years other important towns such as Donegal, which was captured by Niall Garve, and Ballyshannon were taken by allied Anglo-Irish forces. These became part of a pincer movement that allowed English troops at Derry, Dublin and Carrickfergus to penetrate into the heart of alliance-held territory in Tyrone.

After the Treaty of Mellifont that ended the war in 1603, Lifford remained an important garrison town. It was able to hold out during O'Doherty's Rebellion in 1608 and troops from the town helped put down the rebellion.

== Bibliography ==
- McGurk, John. Sir Henry Docwra, 1564-1631: Derry's Second Founder. Four Courts Press, 2006.
