= Iollan Mac an Leagha =

Irish scribe

Iollan Mac an Leagha (fl. c.1462–1473) was a Gaelic author and scribe.

Iollan, or Uilliam, Mac an Leagha was a member of 15th-century Irish scribal family. Among his children were Connla, Eóghan, and Maoleachloinn (fl. 1487), all of whom worked as scribes throughout Ireland in the late 15th century. His books contain lives of saints, homilies, prayers, with an excursion into mythology represented by a 'Life of Hercules' translated from a contemporary printed book. (1).

A decorator and illuminator, Iollan was responsible for some of the most lavish and carefully planned books, one of which - 'History of the Children of Israel' - he boasted of writing in two summer days. They include:

- Bibliothèque Nationale de France MS Celtique I
- British Library Egerton MS 91
- Trinity College Dublin MS 1298 (formerly MS H 2.7)
- National Library of Ireland MS. G.9

He also signed his name to the following:

- British Library Add MS 30512

It has been suggested that this a volume referred to in medieval sources as The Book of Carrick. It was printed as Annla Gearra as Proibhinse Ard Macha in 1958–59.

- British Library Add MS 11809
- Royal Irish Academy MS 23. P.3 (ff 1–17)

The latter was written by him in 1467 at Melaigh Móire, south of Windgap, on the borders of counties Kilkenny and Tipperary, for Aodh Mág Raith (died 1491).

- Bibliothèque Nationale de France MS Celtique I

This was begun in 1473 for Donnchadh mac Brian Dubh Ó Briain, the end which was partly written by his son, Maoleachloinn, in 1497; presumably Iollan was dead by then.

Religious texts by him are:

- 'Dialogue of the Body and Soul'
- 'History of the Monks of Egypt'
- 'Lives of the Irish Saints'

== Sources ==
- Literature in Ireland, by James Carney, in A New History of Ireland, volume, two, pp. 803–04.
