= Short Annals of Leinster =

The Short Annals of Leinster, aka Annala Gearr Laigin, is an Irish annal, covering the years 593 to 1607. It was created by a number of unknown scribes, thought to be monks or chroniclers, or both, between c. 1525 to 1625.

== See also ==
- Annla Gearra as Proibhinse Ard Macha
- Short Annals of Tirconaill
