= Siege of Donegal =

Siege in Ireland that took place in 1601

- Part of the Nine Years' War
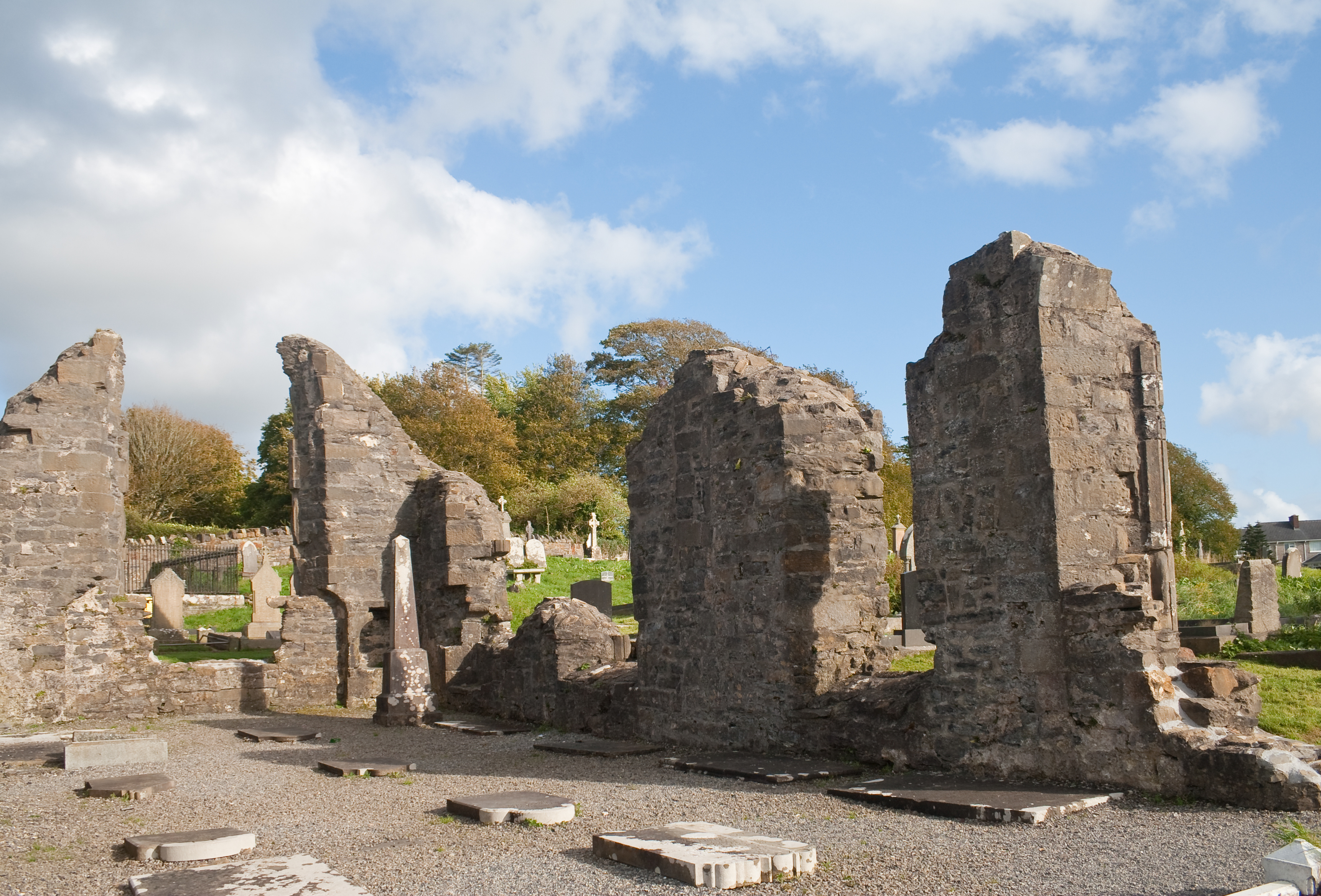
- Donegal Abbey
Date	August 1601
Location	Donegal
Result	English/Loyalist victory

Belligerents
England: Irish loyalists	Gaelic Irish alliance

Commanders and leaders
Niall Garve O'Donnell; Conn O'Donnell †	Hugh Roe O'Donnell

The siege of Donegal took place from August to September 1601 during the Nine Years' War in Ireland, when a Gaelic Irish army led by Hugh Roe O'Donnell laid siege to the town of Donegal. The garrison of the town was a mixture of English troops and allied Gaelic troops led by Niall Garve O'Donnell. Heavy fighting took place during the month-long siege in which Donegal Abbey was destroyed by an accidental gunpowder explosion. Having suffered several repulses, Hugh Roe O'Donnell abandoned the siege and moved his army southwards to Munster where a Spanish force had arrived to support the Irish which culminated in the Battle of Kinsale. In his absence, Crown forces were able to use Donegal as a base to capture the strategic town of Ballyshannon.

Conn O'Donnell was killed during the siege, while fighting for the Crown.
