= Arthur O'Neill (soldier) =

Sir Arthur O'Neill
- Died: 1600; Lifford, Ireland
- Occupation: Soldier
- Parent: Turlough Luineach O'Neill

Sir Arthur O'Neill or Sir Art O'Neill (died 1600) was an Irish soldier and landowner. He was part of the O'Neill dynasty, which was the most powerful Gaelic family in Ireland at the time. He was the son of Turlough Luineach O'Neill, the head of the O'Neill dynasty until 1595. He was the second son of Turlough, but his eldest brother Henry O'Neill died in 1578. At times he had a strained relationship with his father, and offered his support to Turlough's rival Hugh O'Neill, Earl of Tyrone. When Tyrone succeeded Turlough as head of the O'Neills and began Tyrone's Rebellion, Arthur offered tacit support to his distant cousin.

In 1600, however, he made contact with the Crown shortly before an Anglo-Irish force of government troops had landed at Derry and made preparations to change sides and bring his warriors with him. He offered important assistance to the English commander at Derry, Sir Henry Docwra and took part in a force that captured the strategic settlement of Dunnalong. He was also present at the Battle of Lifford, where an important victory was won over the rebel leader Red Hugh O'Donnell. He is also credited with saving Docwra from disaster by exposing an ambush plot by Rory O'Cahan.

Arthur was promised that he would be made Earl of Tyrone, following the attainder of Hugh O'Neill for his rebellion. This would have brought him control over vast swathes of central Ulster, but he died suddenly in late October 1600. His death is generally attributed to heavy drinking at his wedding day celebrations, but he may have been a victim of a fever raging through the army camp. His brother Cormac O'Neill attempted to claim that he was Arthur's successor, but the government rejected this and acknowledged Arthur's eldest son Turlough O'Neill as his heir.

== Bibliography ==
- Bardon, Jonathan. The Plantation of Ulster. Gill & MacMillan, 2012.
- McGurk, John. Sir Henry Docwra, 1564-1631: Derry's Second Founder. Four Courts Press, Dublin, 2006.
- Morgan, Hiram. Tyrone's Rebellion. Boydell Press, 1999.
