= Short Annals of Tirconaill =

Irish annual record with entries dating from 1241 to 1650

The Short Annals of Tirconaill is an Irish annal, or annual record, with entries dating from 1241 to 1650, but with numerous gaps, such as 1241 to 1423. Its authors are unknown; historian Paul Walsh speculated that it had several scribes over the course of some four hundred years, ending in 1650 or the years immediately after.

== See also ==
- Annla Gearra as Proibhinse Ard Macha
- Short Annals of Leinster
- Irish annals
- Annals of the Four Masters
