= Finola O'Donnell =

Irish noblewoman

Finola O'Donnell (née O'Connor), also known as Nuala O'Donnell, was a 15th-century Irish noblewoman remembered for cofounding the Franciscan Monastery in Donegal.

Finola was born to O’Brien (Conor-na-Srona) and later married to Hugh Roe O’Donnell, son of Niall Garve O’Donnell. Sources record her as having been a very charitable woman.

In 1474, Finola O’Donnell helped establish the Franciscan Monastery in Donegal with her husband. The monastery was given to God and the friars of St. Francis. It was meant as a place “for the prosperity of their own souls” as well as a “burial place for themselves and their descendants.” Finola died in 1528.

Between the years of 1632 and 1636, the monastery served as the location for the writing of The Annals of the Four Masters. The authors were said to scour the country for information during the warm seasons and stay within the monastery to write during the cold.
