= Battle of Binnion Hill =

1557 Irish Clan War in County Donegal

Coordinates: 54°54′10″N 07°30′12″W

- Part of the Irish Clan Wars
Date	1557
Location	Binnion Hill near Lifford, Ireland
Result	O'Donnell victory

Belligerents
Clan O'Donnell	Clan O'Neill

Commanders and leaders
Calvagh O'Donnell	John O'Neill

Strength
Unknown	Unknown

Casualties and losses
Unknown	Unknown

The Battle of Binnion Hill was fought in 1557 when John O’Neill, the Grandson of Con O’Neill assembled an army to attack Tirconnell, modern day County Donegal. O’Neill’s plan was to defeat Manus O'Donnell from the Kinel-Connell and thus be the only King in Ulster.

== Preparation ==
O’Neill’s army consisted of people from Oriel, modern day Counties Armagh, Louth and Monaghan and from Dundalk, County Louth. Also, part of O’Neill’s army was Hugh O’Donnell (brother of Calvagh) and his followers. They marched from their stronghold in Tyrone until they reached Carraig Laith (Carrickalee, Strabane, County Tyrone). O’Neill set up his camp here which lies between the River Mourne and River Finn. Carraig Laith is close to where the two rivers meet to create the River Foyle. The Kinel-Connell was in turmoil at this time as Calvagh O'Donnell had his father locked up for two years so that he himself could be ruler of the O’Donnell’s and O’Donnell lands. Calvagh, unsure of what to do in the event of an attack from the O’Neill’s consulted with his father who advised not to attack the O’Neill’s but to wait until they crossed the river and then to attack their camp at Carraig Laith. Calvagh who had sent his cattle into the wilds of Tirconnell to protect them from the O’Neill’s, but on hearing this John O’Neill declared that even if they got passed his army with their animals he would follow them until they submitted to his authority. O’Neill and his army left their camp in Tyrone, crossing the River Finn and marched towards Raphoe then along the Laggan to a place called Baile-aighidh-chaoin, where they set up a new camp. This is now known as Balleeghan townland, close to the banks of Lough Swilly in Raymoghy Parish. Calvagh who was at a meeting on the summit of Bennin (Binnion). (Binnion Hill can be found four kilometres north-west of Porthall and eight kilometres north of Lifford). Others with Calvagh were his son Con and Walter McSweeney, who had brought two companies of gallowglasses of the McSweeney’s of Fanad, also there was Donnell Gorm McSweeney and his followers who were the descendants of Donnell.

== Attack ==
Two members of Calvagh’s party were sent to spy on the O’Neill camp and report back to Calvagh at Binnion. On hearing the testimony of the spying mission Calvagh decide to attack John O’Neill and his forces at his camp immediately. The troops of Calvagh numbering two battalion’s marched on the O’Neill camp and began killing and slaughtering all before them. John O’Neill on hearing the commotion in his camp realised that he was under attack and fearing for his life slipped out of the back of his tent. Two other people escaped with O’Neill that night, namely Hugh O’Donnell (son of Manus) and Donough O’Gallagher (son of Felim Finn). The three men in their retreat back into Tyrone had to cross the Burn Deele, River Finn and the River Derg by swimming across them and as it had been raining heavily that night the rivers were very swollen, making it even more dangerous. On reaching Tearmonn-Ui-Moain, he bought a horse and made his way to Aireagal-da-Chiarog by morning. Meanwhile back at battle site Calvagh and his men were in high spirits and enjoying the spoils of war. In the morning when the booty was being divided up Con (son of Calvagh) got as his portion eighty horses, the prize of all the horses was Shane O'Neill’s (son of John) own horse called ‘The Son of the eagle’. The spoils from the battle were the most from any battle between the O’Neill’s and O’Donnell’s.
