= Annla Gearra as Proibhinse Ard Macha =

Annla Gearra as Proibhinse Ard Macha, in English The Short Annals of the Province of Armagh, is an Irish text contained in British Library, Add MS 30512, compiled c. 1460–75.

The Annala Gearra Ard Macha covers events in Irish history from the lifetime of Lóegaire mac Néill (died c. 462) to 1134 ("In bliadhain post ec Muircertaig comarba Patraic {folio 40vb} & abdaine do gabail do Niall & ordned Mailmedoc hUi Morgair & rl—."). The manuscript was penned by Iollan Mac an Leagha, a professional scribe.

== See also ==
- Book of Armagh
- Short Annals of Tirconaill
