= Dugan =

Duggan
Origin
- Origin: Irish
- Meaning: Derived from Dubhagáin meaning dark or black
- Region of origin: Gaelic

Other names
- Variant forms: Dugan, Duggan, Dougan, Doogan, Dogan

Dugan or Duggan (Irish: Ó Dúgáin) is an Irish surname derived from Ó Dubhagáin. The best known family of the name had its territory near the modern town of Fermoy in north Cork, and were originally the ruling family of the Fir Maighe tribal group which gave its name to the town. They claimed descent from Mug Ruith, the legendary magician of the Fir Bolg. They ceded pre-eminence to the O'Keeffe family in the eleventh century, but remained powerful in the area. Along with the other Fir Maighe families they lost their power when the Normans conquered the territory in the twelfth and thirteenth centuries.

== History ==
In modern day, the name is found throughout Ireland. In the north, Dugan, Dougan, and Doogan are common, a large portion descended from families originally in County Fermanagh. Doogan is common in County Donegal. Duggan is most prevalent in Dublin, Munster, and the majority of County Cork, County Tipperary, County Wexford, and County Waterford.

== Use of the surname in other countries ==
Dugan and Dougan are also common Scottish names. Throughout other English speaking countries, Dugan and its many variants, including Duggan, Dougan, Doughan, Doogan, and Duggin are widespread. Dugan ranked 1,705 in surname listings in the 1990 United States census. In Great Britain, Duggan ranked 1,950 in surname listings from the 1881 Census, then surged to 1,025 in surname listings from the 1996 Electoral roll.

== Surname ==
Dugan

- Alan Dugan (1923–2003), American poet whose work won the National Book Award and the Pulitzer Prize for Poetry
- Brendan Dugan (born 1952), New Zealand country musician
- David W. Dugan (born 1960), American Federal District Court Judge, Southern District of Illinois
- Dennis Dugan (born 1946), American actor and film director
- Eileen C. Dugan (1945–1996), New York politician
- Fred Dugan (1933–2018), American football player with the San Francisco 49ers, Dallas Cowboys, and Washington Redskins
- Hannah Dugan (born 1959), American lawyer and judge
- Ianthe Jeanne Dugan, American journalist
- James Dugan, various individuals
- Jeff Dugan (born 1981), American football player with the Minnesota Vikings
- Joanne Bechta Dugan (born 1958), American computer engineer
- Joe Dugan (1897–1982), American baseball player from 1917 to 1931
- John T. Dugan (1921–1998) American writer
- Len Dugan (1910–1967), American football player
- Michael Dugan, several people
- Raymond Smith Dugan (1878–1940), American Astronomer, textbook author, and professor at Princeton University
- Regina E. Dugan (born 1963), American inventor
- Robert Dugan (born 1959), Australian cricketer
- Timothy Dugan (born 1953), American judge
- Tom Dugan (actor, born 1889) (1889–1955), Irish film actor
- Tom Dugan (actor, born 1961) (born 1961), American theater, film, and television actor
- Winston Dugan, 1st Baron Dugan of Victoria (1877–1951), British administrator who served as governor of South Australia

Duggan

- Alan Duggan (born 1942), Irish rugby union player
- Alfred Duggan (1903–1964), Argentine-British author and historian
- Elena Duggan (born 1983), Masterchef Australia winner
- Hubert Duggan (1904–1943), Argentine-British soldier and Member of Parliament
- Jeremiah Duggan (1980–2003), British student who died in disputed circumstances linked to the LaRouche movement
- Jim Duggan (born 1954), American professional wrestler known as "Hacksaw" Jim Duggan
- John Duggan (born 1948), Irish rugby union player
- Jordan Duggan (born 1998), Irish rugby union player
- Laurence Duggan (1905–1948), American economist and government official; Soviet spy
- Luis Duggan (1906–1987), Argentine polo player
- Madeline Duggan (born 1994), British actress
- Mark Duggan (1981–2011), British man shot and killed by police in Tottenham, London, England
- Mark Duggan (born 1970), American economist
- Max Duggan (born 2001), American football player
- Mike Duggan (born 1958), American mayor of Detroit, Michigan
- Meghan Duggan (born 1987), American women's ice hockey player
- Marion Duggan (1884–1943), Irish suffragist and activist.
- Patricia Duggan, American glass artist and philanthropist
- Patrick Duggan (bishop) (1813–1896), Irish Roman Catholic clergyman
- Patrick J. Duggan (1933–2020), American judge
- Peter Duggan (born 1993), Irish hurler
- Ricardo Duggan (1907–2015), Argentine actor
- Robert Duggan (attorney) (1926–1974), Allegheny County District Attorney
- Robert W. Duggan (born 1944), American billionaire entrepreneur and investor
- Seánie Duggan (1922–2013), Irish hurler
- Stephen P. Duggan (1870–1950), American scholar and educator; father of Laurence
- Toni Duggan (born 1991), English association footballer
- Willie Duggan (1950–2017), Irish rugby union player
- Willie Duggan (boxer) (1925–2014), Irish professional boxer

Doogan

- Bailey Doogan (1941–2022), American artist
- Dave Doogan (born 1973), Scottish politician
- Mike Doogan (born 1948), American writer, journalist and politician

Dougan

- Dougan (surname)

Ó Dubhagáin

- Seán Mór Ó Dubhagáin (died 1372), Irish Gaelic poet

== Given name ==
- Dugan Aguilar (1947–2018), Native American photographer
- Duggan Anderson (1924–2012), Australian rules footballer
- Dugan Ashley, American blogger
- Dugan Aycock (1908–2001), American professional golfer
- Dugan Basham (born 1952), American professional stock car racing driver
- Dugan Darnell (born 1997), American professional baseball player
- Dugan McNeill, American musician
- Dougan Sherwood, American businessman

== Fictional characters ==
- Duggan, a police detective Inspector as played by Tom Chadbon in the 1979 Doctor Who story City of Death, written by David Agnew – a pseudonym for the combined efforts of Douglas Adams and Graham Williams rewriting an original script by David Fisher
- Dum Dum Dugan, an officer of S.H.I.E.L.D. and is one of the most experienced members of Nick Fury's team, known for his marksmanship with rifles and for his impressive physique.
- Pat Dugan, a superhero from DC Comics, wears an armoured suit called S.T.R.I.P.E. Former member of the Seven Soldiers of Victory and once the sidekick to the Star-Spangled Kid. Stepfather to Courtney Whitmore.

== See also ==
- Fermoy
