= Tom Duggan =

American commentator

Thomas Duggan Goss (August 20, 1915 – May 28, 1969) was an American journalist, writer and actor. He appeared on NBC and ABC as a radio and television commentator in Chicago and Los Angeles and was a crusader against Chicago mob involvement in boxing and politics.

== Early years ==
Duggan was born as Thomas Goss to Irish-American parents in Chicago, Cook County, Illinois. His father was a plumber. He grew up in Chicago and went to work as his father's assistant.

In 1943, during World War II, Duggan enlisted in the United States Marine Corps and served in the 3rd Marine Division in the South Pacific. Near the end of the war, he was assigned to Armed Forces Radio in China, developing an interest in broadcasting.

After his discharge, Duggan became a radio announcer for station KCLU in Santa Barbara, California, using the name Tom Goss.

== NBC Chicago ==
In 1949 Duggan went to work for the NBC radio (WMAQ) and television (WNBQ) outlets in Chicago. He now called himself Tom Duggan, the name he would use for the rest of his career. Duggan's nightly 15 minute television sports commentary on WNBQ at 10:30 quickly gained popularity.

Duggan constantly spoke out against Chicago mob figures and corrupt politicians in the International Boxing Club (IBC), the governing body for professional boxing. He continually railed against James D. Norris and his partner Arthur Wirtz over the mob's influence in boxing. Duggan finally alleged on-air that Norris had threatened to kill him. Both Norris and NBC demanded an apology, and when Duggan refused he was fired.

The Chicago Tribune reported that "the station and newspaper offices were swamped with phone calls protesting Duggan's dismissal.""Tom Duggan Affair Reaps Whirlwind of Fan Protests". March 1, 1953.

Letters published in the Tribune included the following:

"Tom Duggan – Unafraid. A voice crying in the wilderness! St. George and The Dragon! So Long Tom – we'll all crawl back into our safe little shells now we've had our brief moment in the sun."

"Whether you like Duggan or not, what this country needs is more young guys telling whoever and whatever they think needs a little airing."

"If Tom Duggan tomorrow would enter politics and run on the Democratic ticket for Mayor of Chicago, his popularity would push him in with a landslide."

Because of his enormous popularity, Chicago newspapers had big, bold front-page headlines announcing his firing. A petition was circulated throughout Chicago, calling for Duggan's reinstatement.

On May 11, 1953 Time magazine wrote "In Chicago, TV Sportscaster Tom Duggan has as many detractors among his 250,000 viewers as he has fans, but they all get some sort of kick out of his outspoken opinions. Last February, when Duggan was fired by NBC's station WNBQ for saying on the air that President Jim Norris of the International Boxing Club was "palling around with gangsters," the station was swamped with protests. An NBC apology persuaded Norris to withdraw his libel suit and Duggan was returned to the air. Last month Duggan was at it again. On his 10:30 p.m. show, he took a few sideswipes at the forthcoming championship Marciano-Walcott fight, which is promoted by Jim Norris and his I.B.C., and due to be televised by NBC. The next day, says Duggan, he was fired again. Thousands of Duggan fans again phoned, wired and wrote their protests, but this time NBC stiffly announced that it had "terminated the services of Mr. Thomas Duggan because of his failure to adhere to . . . standard operating policies. This policy requires all material for broadcast to be cleared in advance." Duggan was far from silenced. He still had a sports column in the Chicago American at $250 a week. And, five days later, he was back with a new sponsor and a new vote of confidence, hired to do two half-hour sports shows at $200 each over ABC's station WBKB-TV. Said Duggan, by now used to landing on his feet: "I'm not trying to be a crusader on sports. I'm more like an umpire, calling the plays as I see 'em."

== ABC Chicago ==
With NBC refusing to rehire him, Duggan accepted a job with ABC as a nightly commentator on WBKB (now WLS-TV).

Duggan has been called:

"... loud, abrasive, and at times unpredictable. Perhaps best described as the Morton Downey, Jr. of his day, Duggan also had ties to the Chicago Mob, an association that made Quinlan nervous, especially when Duggan would "predict" a Mob hit on the air and two or three weeks later that hit would come to pass."

"To take advantage of his recognition for his anti-mob stand, ABC proposed that Duggan host a special presentation on Chicago mob boss Tony Accardo, revealing his links with organised crime. ABC sought the co-operation of the Chicago Crime Commission and state and local law enforcement to compile material and protect Duggan should there be retribution for the show. However, some staff at ABC and various law enforcement officials opposed the show."

The concept was abandoned after a meeting between ABC manager Sterling Quinlan and Accardo himself at the Tradewinds lounge. Instead, Duggan hosted a talk show from 11:10 until midnight on weeknights. It was the first all-talk show to appear on television.

The show covered many issues, but Duggan continued his attacks on alleged mob influence in boxing. Viewers could call in and submit questions to a "girl Friday," who then read them to Duggan. Fearing attack by mobsters, Duggan began carrying a pistol.

The nighttime show became so popular that Duggan was also given an afternoon audience participation show and a Saturday evening variety show. All three shows outrated their competitors. In 1955, Duggan strongly supported the first election campaign of Richard J. Daley. Daley would become Chicago's longest-serving mayor.

== Contempt of court ==
Also in 1955, Duggan was sentenced to ten days in jail for contempt of court after commenting on a divorce case being heard by Cook County Judge Daniel A. Covelli. Duggan's name had been mentioned in the case after a private detective alleged the wife involved had slept with Duggan. Duggan denied the allegation on-air and charged that the husband in the case was associated with the mob.

Judge Covelli found that Duggan was in contempt of court for making allegations which would reflect poorly on witnesses. Covelli himself would subsequently be identified as a protégé of Chicago's First Ward mobster Pat Marcy. Duggan would later receive a full pardon from Illinois Governor Otto Kerner, Jr.

== Move to Los Angeles ==
On February 9, 1956, Duggan resigned from ABC and moved to Los Angeles.

Roger M. Grace wrote in a column,

“In retrospect, it appears that Tom Duggan, a colorful and controversial talk show host and commentator in Los Angeles in the 1950s and '60s, had been chased out of Chicago, where he was exposing corruption, by a judge who was himself linked with underworld figures."

Duggan hosted television shows on KCOP-TV, KTLA and KTTV, and wrote a newspaper column for the Los Angeles Herald-Examiner. In early 1965 Duggan was hired to do the morning drive show on KBLA-Burbank (1500 AM) as part of the station's new top 40 format, but lasted only a couple of months. He then moved over to KLAC ("Two-Way Radio") to host a talk show and stayed for four years. In 1967 he commuted between Los Angeles and Chicago for 10 months to tape a program for Chicago television.

Duggan also acted in movies and on television. His films included But Not for Me with Clark Gable, and Frankenstein 1970 with Boris Karloff. His largest movie role was in Blueprint for Robbery (1961) in which he played District Attorney James Livingston.

== Death ==
On May 28, 1969, Tom Duggan was involved in a serious traffic accident. He died the following day at the age of 53, and was buried at Holy Cross Cemetery. Pallbearers included then Los Angeles Mayor Sam Yorty and actor Jimmy Durante.

== Filmography ==
Year	Title	Role	Notes
1956	The Vagabond King	Burgundy	
1957	Hear Me Good	TV Director	
1958	Frankenstein 1970	Mike Shaw	
1958	Born Reckless	Mark Wilson	
1958	Andy Hardy Comes Home	Councilman Warren	
1959	But Not for Me	Roy Morton	
1959	Beloved Infidel	Nunnally Johnson	Uncredited
1961	Blueprint for Robbery	District Attorney James Livingston	
1962	Paradise Alley	Policeman	

== See also ==
- Dugan
- Seán Mór Ó Dubhagáin (died 1372) Gaelic-Irish poet.
- Patrick Duggan (November 10, 1813 – August 15, 1896) Roman Catholic Bishop of Clonfert.
- Tomás Bacach Ó Dúgáin, (fl. 1848–1858), scribe.
- Maolsheachlainn Ó Dúgáin, (fl. mid-19th century), scribe.
- Liam Ó Dúgáin, 1922 – 2013), Irish sportsman.
- Joe Dugan (1897–1982), American baseball player from 1917 to 1931
- General Michael Dugan (born 1937), former Chief of Staff of the United States Air Force
- Raymond Smith Dugan, (1878–1940), American Astronomer, textbook author and professor at Princeton University
- Jeremiah Duggan (1980–2003), British student who died in disputed circumstances linked to the LaRouche movement.
