= One-dollar salary =

Nominal salary for a business executive or government employee

A one-dollar salary is a method used when a business executive or government employee wishes to work without direct compensation, but must receive a salary above zero to legally distinguish them from a volunteer. The concept first emerged in the early 1900s, when various American leaders of industry offered their services to the government during times of war. In the late 1990s and early 2000s, many executives began accepting one-dollar salaries—often in the case of struggling companies or startups—with the potential for further indirect earnings as the result of stock ownership. Many choose to reduce their salary to avoid income taxes.

== Dollar-a-year men ==
In the early-to-mid-20th century, "dollar-a-year men" were business and government executives who helped the government mobilize and manage American industry during periods of war, notably World War I, World War II, and the Korean War. U.S. law generally forbids the government from accepting the services of unpaid volunteers, but specific authorities exist within some agencies. Those employed by the government had to be paid a nominal salary, and the salary establishes their legal relationship as employees of the government. During World War I, about 1,000 such people were employed by the United States. While they received only a dollar in salary from the government, most executives had their salaries paid by the companies.

The first known such employee was Gifford Pinchot, working for Theodore Roosevelt. After Pinchot, the United States Department of Agriculture employed several dollar-a-year men. On June 19, 1933, Frances Perkins, Secretary of Labor appointed a five-member Labor Advisory Board, of whom two members came from the Amalgamated Clothing Workers union, of whom one, Sidney Hillman, was a dollar-a-year man. Progressive lawyer Max Lowenthal was a dollar-a-year man as legal counsel on various congressional committees, befriended U.S. Senator Harry S. Truman, and wound up as a dollar-a-year man in Truman's cabinet.

=== World War I ===
Bernard Baruch was the first businessman employed for a one-dollar salary. During World War I, the Advisory Commission to the Council of National Defense was staffed largely by dollar-a-year men, including Bernard Baruch, Robert S. Brookings, and Herbert Bayard Swope.

=== Interwar ===
Massachusetts Governor Alvan T. Fuller, wealthy in his own right, served in several government positions on such terms.

=== New Deal and World War II ===
Kentucky's Ashland Oil and Refining Company founder and CEO, Paul G. Blazer (1890–1966), served twice as a government salaried dollar-a-year man: from 1933 to 1935 under President Franklin D. Roosevelt's National Recovery Administration on the Code of Fair Competition for the Petroleum Industry as Chairman of the Blazer Committee and a second time during World War II as Chairman of District II Refining for Roosevelt's Petroleum Administration of War. Herman Wouk worked in Washington, D.C., as a dollar-a-year man writing radio scripts for the U.S. Treasury's Defense Bond Campaign beginning in June 1941. During World War II, socialite Doris Duke worked in a canteen for U.S. sailors in Egypt at such a salary.

In Canada during World War II, C. D. Howe, Canada's "Minister of Everything", created a rearmament program using "dollar-a-year men". An example was John Wilson McConnell, the owner and publisher of the Montreal Star, who was appointed Director of Licences for the Wartime Trade Board, a position for which he served for free. Others include E. P. Taylor and Austin Cotterell Taylor.

== Recent examples ==
Some recent one-dollar salary earners worked in government as well, most notably former California governor Arnold Schwarzenegger, former Massachusetts governor Mitt Romney, and former New York City mayor Michael Bloomberg.

After promising to take only a dollar a year in November 2016, U.S. president Donald Trump in his first term donated the first three months of his salary to the National Park Service and stated plans to donate all of his salary during the term. He later donated his salary to various federal departments, as he had promised to do during his campaign. In 2015, then 15-year-old Corbin Duncan petitioned the Australian prime minister, Malcolm Turnbull, to take up a $1 salary. The petition was unsuccessful but gained international media coverage.

== Instances of alternative compensation ==
While many executives who take a one-dollar salary also choose not to take any other forms of compensation, a number earn millions more in bonuses and/or other forms of compensation. For example, in 2010–11 Oracle's founder and CEO Larry Ellison made only $1 in salary, but earned over $77 million in other forms of compensation.

In some cases, in lieu of a salary, the executives receive stock options. In the United States, this approach impacts personal tax liability, because although stock and option grants are taxed at federal income rates, they may be exempt from some portion of payroll taxes (typically 7.65%) used to fund Social Security and Medicare.

Executives argue that remuneration through stock instead of salary ties management performance to their financial benefits. The assumption is that stock prices will reflect the actual value of a company, which reflect the management performance of the company. Detractors argue that this incentive may drive short-term planning over long-term planning.

== Notable one-dollar salary earners ==
The following people have been employed for annual salaries of one dollar:

- Arnold Schwarzenegger (former Governor of California)
- Darren Entwistle (TELUS)
- David Filo (Yahoo!)
- David Lloyd George (former Prime Minister of the United Kingdom)
- Donald Trump (in his first term as President of the United States)
- Edward Lampert (Sears Holdings)
- Elon Musk (Tesla Motors, SpaceX)
- Eric Schmidt (Google)
- Evan Spiegel (Snap)
- F. Thomson Leighton (Akamai)
- Henry Samueli (Broadcom Corporation)
- Herbert Hoover (former President of the United States)
- Jack Dorsey (Twitter)
- Jan Koum (WhatsApp)
- Jeremy Stoppelman (Yelp)
- Jerry Yang (Yahoo!)
- John F. Kennedy (former President of the United States)
- John Mackey (Whole Foods Market)
- Jon Corzine (former Governor of New Jersey)
- Larry Ellison (Oracle Corporation)
- Larry Page (Alphabet Inc.)
- Lee Iacocca (Chrysler Corporation)
- Mark Pincus (Zynga)
- Mark Zuckerberg (Facebook)
- Meg Whitman (Hewlett-Packard)
- N. R. Narayana Murthy (Infosys)
- Richard Fairbank (Capital One Financial)
- Richard Hayne (Urban Outfitters)
- Richard Riordan (Mayor of Los Angeles)
- Robert Duggan (Pharmacyclics)
- Michael Saylor (MicroStrategy)
- Sehat Sutardja (Marvell Technology Group)
- Sergey Brin (Alphabet Inc.)
- Steve Jobs (Apple)
- Terry Semel (Yahoo!)
- Vikram Pandit (Citigroup)
- William Clay Ford Jr. (Ford Motor Company)
- William Knudsen (Chairman of the Office of Production Management)

== See also ==
- Peppercorn (legal)
