= Ó Dubhagáin =

Ó Dubhagáin (reformed spelling Ó Dúgáin), anglicised Dugan or Duggan, was the name of a bardic family from Baile Uí Dhubhagáin, in Uí Maine, (now Ballyduggan, Loughrea, County Galway). The family were not related to similarly named family of Dugan of Fermoy, County Cork.

== Notable people ==
- Seán Mór Ó Dubhagáin (died 1372), Irish poet and historian
- Tomás Bacach Ó Dúgáin (fl. 1848-1858), scribe
- Maolsheachlainn Ó Dúgáin (fl. mid-19th century), scribe
- Liam Ó Dúgáin (fl. mid-19th century), scribe
- John Doogan (1853–1940), Irish recipient of the Victoria Cross
- Winston Dugan, 1st Baron Dugan of Victoria (1876-1951), son of a Dugan of County Galway
- Richard E. Duggan (b. 1952), artist/designer
- Michael Dugan (b. 1937), General
