= Robert Duggan =

Robert Duggan may refer to:

- Bob Dugan (1940–2026), American football player
- Robert Duggan (attorney) (1926–1974)
- Robert Duggan (venture capitalist), American billionaire entrepreneur, biotech and health care executive

== See also ==
- Robert Dugan (born 1959), Australian cricketer
