= Texaphyrin =

Family of macrocyclic chemical compounds

Texaphyrin general structure

Texaphyrins are a family of heterocyclic, macrocyclic molecules that are porphyrin derivatives. They were first invented by University of Texas at Austin professor Jonathan Sessler and his group. The name texaphyrin arose because some of the molecules have a shape that can superimpose onto the points of the star featured on the state flag of Texas. Texaphyrins were nominated as the "State Molecule of Texas", but the buckyball was chosen instead.

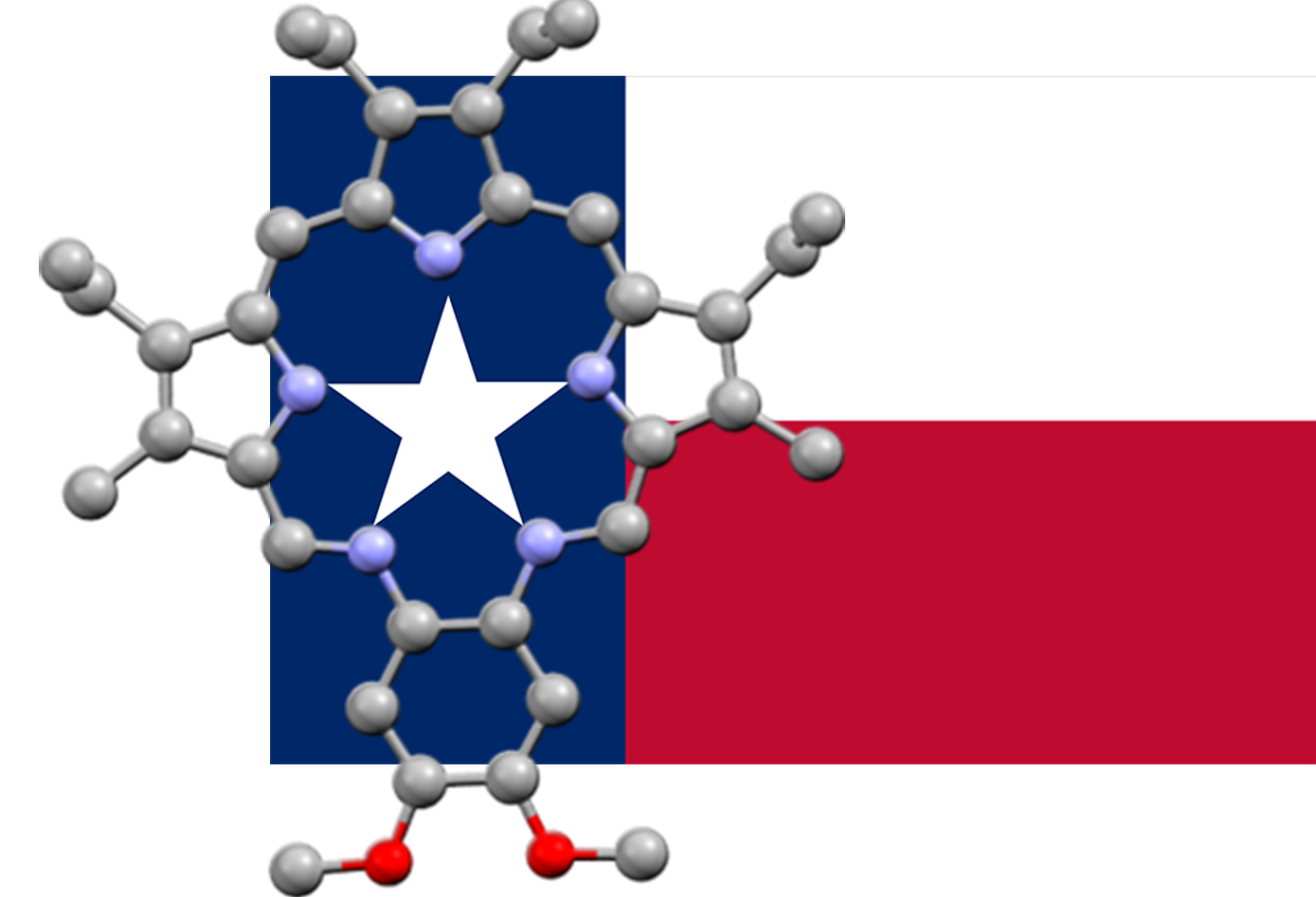
Texaphyrin core Nitrogen superimpose with 5 points of the star featured on the state flag of Texas

Sessler has described possible medicinal uses of these compounds in the Proceedings of the National Academy of Sciences and other scientific journals. Pharmacyclics, Inc., a publicly traded company begun by Sessler, licensed the technology behind texaphyrins from the university to develop commercial and medical uses for the molecules. Motexafin lutetium is a texaphyrin, marketed as Antrin by Pharmacyclics Inc. It is a photosensitiser for use in photodynamic therapy to treat skin conditions and Prostate cancer. Pharmacyclics and the rights to texaphyrins was sold to AbbVie in 2015 for 21 billion dollars.

== Synthesis of Texaphyrins ==
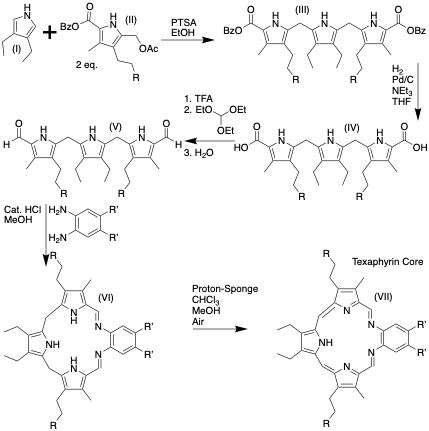
Original synthesis of texaphyrins developed by Jonathan Sessler

The Texaphyrin core is synthesized from the scheme shown above featuring the symmetric tri-pyrrole which is subsequently cyclized. To aromatize the texaphyrin core Sessler et al. used Cd2+, however this process was quickly replaced to allow large scale synthesis of the texaphyrin core. The synthesis starts with the addition of electron rich pyrrole (I) into (II) at the C2 and C5 positions of (I), effectively displacing the acetate moiety of (II). Next, the benzyl groups are cleaved via hydrogenolysis yielding diacid (III) which is subsequently converted to the aldehyde via a decarboxylation-formylation sequence similar to a Clezy formylation. The dialdehyde is then treated with the aromatic diamine to enact an imine condensation to form the macrocyclic core of Texaphyrin. Once the core of the porphyrin has been established a final oxidation is done using air and chloroform to afford the basic Texaphyrin as a green solid. The aromatic diamine can have a variety of different substituents where R is listed, and in the case of Motexafin these are polyether chains.

== Texaphyrin Complexes and Chemistry ==
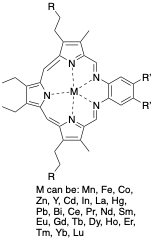
Generic texaphyrin complex and known metal centers

Texaphyrin is known to make stable complexes with the elements shown in the figure, and unlike traditional porphyrins texaphyrins possess only a -1 charge instead of the typical -2. Many of the metals that can form complexes with texaphyrins are metals that commonly exist in the +3-oxidation state, and part of the lanthanide series, however 12 main group metals form stable complexes as well in both the +2 and +3 oxidation state. The most common complex is with Gd (III) which is closely related to Motexafin gadolinium, used for the treatment of cancer. More recently the Pb and Bi complexes have drawn attention from the Sessler groups as metal centers that could provide a more diverse array of biological applications, but little outside exploration has been done. Texaphyrins have recently seen use for the detection of heavy metals in water which can be used in both a qualitative and quantitative fashion. Sessler and coworkers have employed the use of reduced texaphyrins (compound VI in the synthesis scheme) to detect heavy metals in water as these metal ions cause the texaphyrin to oxidize and subsequently change color which can be observed by the naked eye, and quantitatively measured using UV-Vis to determine the concentration of the metal ion. Currently this method works for the detection of Hg(II), In(III), Cd(II), Mn(II), Bi(III), Co(II), and Pb(II) with the ability to detect amounts as low as 228 ppb.

== Medical Applications of Texaphyrins ==
Texaphyrins have seen medical applications, primarily in the form of Motexafin gadolinium and Motexafin lutetium which are used as chemotherapeutics in the treatment of cancer. The two Motexafin compounds showed initial promise compared to other texaphyrins due to the combination of water solubility and mild lipophilicity, as many other texaphyrins were too lipophilic to begin phase 1 trial. Texaphyrins have an advantage over traditional porphyrins as chemotherapeutics due to the fact they are pentapyrrolic rather than the classical tetrapyrrolic allowing for a much wider range of metal centers that vary in both atomic radius and oxidation state. Texaphyrin is also unique from other porphyrins due to the fact that it is a redox active porphyrin which is easily reduced relative to other porphyrins. Since texaphyrin exists in the -1 state with the ability to become -2 under physiological conditions, it has the redox active advantage over traditional porphyrins which often exist in the -2 state. This ease of reduction allows texaphyrins to act as sort of redox shuttles with the ability to produce reactive oxygen species which can subsequently induce apoptosis, providing promise as a therapeutic when localized in cancer cells. When used in conjunction with targeted chemotherapy, texaphyrin is able to increase efficacy relative to the original chemotherapeutic alone as texaphyrin can prevent recovery of the cancerous cell. Texaphyrins have also shown promise as MRI contrast agents due to the fact that they are active on both T1 and T2 scans while most MRI contrast agents are only active for one type of scan. This MRI active property of texaphyrins has also led the Sessler group to explore the possibility of conjugating on existing platinum-based chemotherapeutics in order to help monitor delivery. This would allow for the minimization of off target effects from the platinum based chemotherapeutic. Conjugation of these platinum-based drugs to texaphyrin also may increases efficacy as research from the Sessler group has shown conjugation increases the concentration of intracellular platinum. Despite all of these promising results the FDA gave non-approval for the texaphyrin Motexafin gadolinium shortly after finishing phase 2 clinical trials for the treatment of non-small cell lung cancer with brain metatheses, however the exact reason for its failure was not stated. Shortly after non-approval Pharmacyclics announced they plan to continue to pursue candidates based on the texaphyrins in hopes of having a similar compound granted FDA approval, but neither Pharmacyclics nor the current owners of the company AbbVie, appear to have developed anything since.
