= Dougan (disambiguation) =

Dougan a food variety popular in China. Dougan may also refer to

- Dougan Round Barn in Beloit, Wisconsin, United States
- Houghtaling & Dougan, an American architectural firm
- Dougan (surname)
