= Paul G. Blazer =

Entrepreneur (1890–1966)

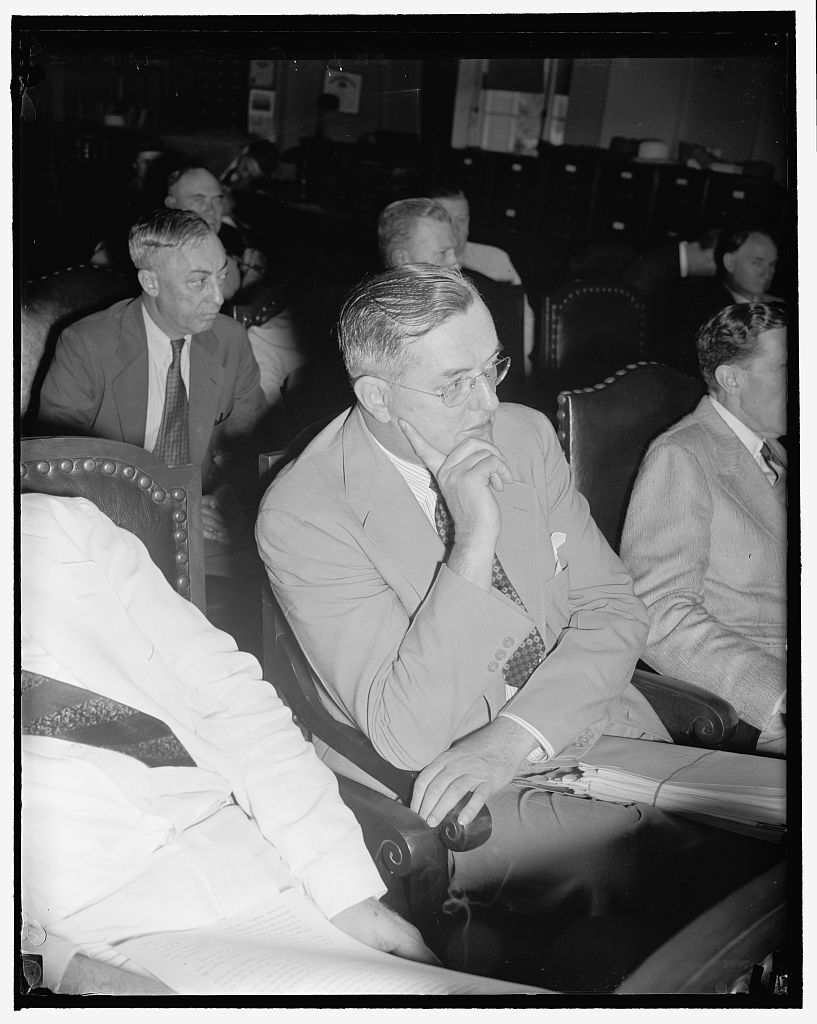
- Blazer testifies before the House Judiciary Committee on June 23, 1939
- Born: September 19, 1890; New Boston, Illinois, United States
- Died: December 9, 1966 (age 76); Scottsdale, Arizona, United States
- Resting place: Ashland Cemetery, Ashland, Kentucky, United States
- Occupations: President and CEO of Ashland Inc.
- Years active: 1924–1957
- Employer(s): Ashland, Inc., Ashland Oil and Refining Company, Inc, Swiss Oil Company
- Known for: Founder (1924), president (1936–1944), and CEO (1944–1957) of Ashland Oil and Refining Company, Inc. / Ashland, Inc.; supporter of education
- Spouse: Georgia Monroe (April 1917)(1895–1991)
- Children: 3

Paul Garrett Blazer (September 19, 1890 – December 9, 1966) was president and CEO of Ashland Oil and Refining Company (Ashland, Inc.) located in Ashland, Kentucky.

== Early life ==
Blazer was born on September 19, 1890, in New Boston, Illinois to Presbyterians David Newton Blazer and Mary Melinda Blazer (née Janes). Blazer's father's childhood home was station number three on the Underground Railroad that began at Quincy, Illinois and was described as being on "the avenue to freedom in Canada for runaway slaves from Missouri and Kentucky and hundreds of them passing through to freedom were harbored at the Blazer home." Blazer's father, his father's brother and father's sister were school teachers. His father left the teaching profession as a school principal and subsequently became the publisher of the nearby Aledo Times-Record regional newspaper.

At the age of 12, Blazer began selling magazine subscriptions for The Saturday Evening Post and Ladies Home Journal, and he eventually hired a full-time secretary. Blazer was a star on his high school football team and a track star in high school and in college. After high school, he enrolled at William & Vashti College in Aledo, Illinois. After one year of college, Blazer joined the Educational Division of Curtis Publishing Company in Philadelphia, Pennsylvania, as manager of its school subscriptions. His responsibilities included devising advertisements that ran in the Saturday Evening Post.

While in Philadelphia, Blazer became active in the progressive Bull Moose Party and former President Theodore Roosevelt's unsuccessful campaign for the 1912 Republican Party presidential nomination. Blazer ended up on the platform with President Roosevelt for his April 10 whistle-stop train tour stop in Philadelphia. Blazer left Curtis Publishing and Philadelphia in 1914, and returned to his magazine business in Illinois. On a Curtis Publishing scholarship, he enrolled at the University of Chicago, earning an associate degree in philosophy in 1915. The scholarship was conditional on maintaining 400 magazine subscriptions. Blazer further expanded his subscription business when he purchased a renewal subscriptions business with 960 customers in 1914 and another renewal subscription business in 1916 with 1900 customers from a Curtis distributor in Chicago, further expanding his magazine business in Chicago and into Milwaukee. While attending University of Chicago, Blazer was the student coordinator for the student sports program and business manager of the Cap & Gown yearbook staff. Under his direction they achieved record income.

In 1917, during World War I, Blazer entered the 123rd U.S. Army Hospital Unit organized by the university, received a medical discharge due to an accident later that year. He worked a short time for Chittenden Press in Chicago before going to The Great Northern Refining Co. as advertising manager. He quickly moved into the sales department and in 1918 became sales manager.

In April 1917, Blazer married Georgia Monroe, whom he had met at the University of Chicago. The Blazers had three children: Paul Garrett Jr., Doris Virginia, and Stuart Monroe. In 1939, Governor Happy Chandler appointed Mrs. Blazer the first female trustee on the University of Kentucky Board of Trustees. In 1962, Blazer Hall was opened as the Georgia M Blazer Hall [dormitory] for Women in tribute to her 21 years of service on the board. She also served on Kentucky's Council on Public Higher Education.

== Oil industry career ==
In 1920, Paul Blazer went to work as vice president of the Great Southern Oil & Refining Company in Lexington, Kentucky. In 1924 he joined the Swiss Oil Company of Lexington and was in charge of constructing and managing the operations of Ashland Refining Co. in Ashland, Kentucky. Blazer's work managing the company meant that from 1924 to 1957 he was regarded as head of the Ashland family.

In 1930, Blazer became vice president of the newly established Independent Petroleum Association of America, a position he held for ten years. During Franklin Delano Roosevelt's first presidential term in the summer of 1933, J. Howard Marshall, a young assistant solicitor from Yale Law School working for Secretary of the Interior Harold Ickes, launched on a code of fair competition for the petroleum industry. The oil industry sent representatives, including Blazer, to Washington D.C. Blazer served as chairman of the United States Department of the Interior's Petroleum Code Survey Committee on Small Business Enterprise, referred to as the "Blazer Committee". (1933–1936).

While working for the Department of Interior Blazer lobbied the Department of Interior's New Deal agency, the Works Progress Administration, for Kentucky projects, including Ashland's new sewers, new public library and a concrete athletic stadium.

Blazer later became a charter member of the Petroleum Industry Council for National Defense. While Roosevelt was giving his declaration of war speech before the joint session of the United States Congress in Washington D.C., Blazer was several blocks away in preparations for war meetings. After the 1941 outbreak of World War II and the United States imminent inclusion many members of the council, including Blazer, went to work for the Petroleum Administration for War Council as "dollar-a-year men" again under the Secretary of Interior Ickes, Deputy Director Ralph K. Davies and now Solicitor J. Howard Marshall. Its purpose was to "mobilize most effectively all resources and abilities of the petroleum industry to deal with the emergency conditions under which the industry must operate, and to provide a competent, responsible and representative body." July 11, 1941, Secretary Ickes appointed Blazer to District 2's General [oversight] Committee, the Supply and Distribution Committee and Chairman of the District 2 Refining Committee. He served from Council's official creation December 31, 1941 to its dissolution December 6, 1946. During this period the Department of Interior disbursements for the construction of aviation gasoline facilities amounted to $235,836,850.80, which included the 1942 $6,000,000 expansion of the Catlettsburg refinery.

Blazer was on Kentucky Governor Simeon S. Willis' WWII Postwar Planning Commission and he was the chairman of the Transportation Committee. He later served as chairman of the unsuccessful state legislative mandated campaign for a Kentucky constitutional convention (1946–1947).

Blazer was a director and member of the American Petroleum Institute and a member of the National Petroleum Council. He served as a director the Cincinnati Branch Office of the Federal Reserve Bank of Cleveland (1945–1950) and served two years as chairman (1949 and 1950).

The National Petroleum Council (US) was established in 1946 at the request of President Harry S. Truman to represent industry views on Department of Interior matters relating to oil and natural gas. Blazer served on the council from 1946 to 1957.

Blazer kept Ashland Oil and Refining Company active in the Ohio Valley Improvement Association, which was located in the Cincinnati Federal Reserve Bank Building.

Blazer and Hull were prominently involved in the implementation of the Department of Interior's and the United States Army Corps of Engineers' 1953 $200,000,000 Ohio River Navigation Modernization Program, the first such projects since 1929. The projects approved construction of 19 new dual locks and high-lift dams (current list of locks and dams of the Ohio River). The Program contained eight new projects in the portion of the Ohio River owned by Kentucky, and contained the rare structural plans for a bridge over the top of the Greenup County, Kentucky dam. The Greenup Dam is just down river from Ashland was known at the time as The Paul G. Blazer Dam, received site priority. and was built in the 1950s without completion of the bridge top.

Blazer appeared before the U.S. Congress on several occasions testifying on proposed regulations affecting the oil industry and in 1956 testified against a proposed tax on use of the nation's waterways. Blazer, at age 70, was elected chairman and president of the newly established National Waterways Conference in 1960 and re-elected as chairman in 1961.

In 1964, Blazer became the 34th inductee of the Oil Hall of Fame by the National Petroleum News magazine.

== Support for education in Kentucky ==
=== Blazer recognition and awards (1946–1960) ===
- University of Kentucky, Lexington KY: 1948 recipient of the Algernon Sydney Sullivan Award
- Centre College, Danville KY: Honorary degree (1950); and in 1953, Blazer filled the vacancy on the Centre College Board of Trustees caused by the death of his longtime friend Chief Justice Fred M. Vinson, of the U.S. Supreme Court.

Other recognitions included:

- the alumni citation of Useful Citizen (public service) by the University of Chicago in 1949 for his leadership in the call for Kentucky's Constitutional Convention, –
- an honorary degree from the University of Kentucky, Lexington KY in 1952 –- The Kentucky Citation for "distinguished service in the field of Business and Scholarships in Higher Education" from Transylvania College (Transylvania University) in 1954—Kentucky Press Association's 1954 "Kentuckian of the Year", referred to as "a strong supporter of education"
- Citation of Honor for "his outstanding contributions to mankind" from Indiana Technical College (Indiana Institute of Technology) presented at the dedication of the Dana Science Building in 1958 -– Honorary Degrees from Marshall University, Huntington WV in 1958, Pikeville College, Pikeville KY in 1959 and Wilberforce University, Xenia/Wilberforce OH presented at the dedication of the Margaret Ireland Dormitory for Women in 1962.
- Blazer served on the American Sunday School Union board of honorary vice-presidents until his death in 1966. Lincoln Memorial University in Harrogate, Tennessee dedicated Jesse Stuart's lifetime bibliography to Blazer as "Benefactor of Education and a Friend and Admirer of Jesse Stuart" in 1960., and Kentucky State College in Frankfort, KY dedicated The Paul G. Blazer Library on March 6, 1960.
- Influenced by his family's abolitionist heritage and in his relationship with U.S. Supreme Court Chief Justice Fred M. Vinson on the social importance of racial integration in education, the Kentucky State College library was Blazer's first acceptance of a public naming request. Blazer's personal contributions to Kentucky State College initiated the student loan fund in 1950 and his May 29, 1960 Kentucky State College commencement address on integration and educational advancement was recorded in the June 28, 1960 United States Congressional Record.

=== School naming request (1957) ===
In 1957 Blazer again played a significant role in the Ashland area's higher education opportunities with his work towards the University of Kentucky taking over the teaching and day-to-day operations from the Ashland Independent School District's Board of Education for the Ashland Junior College.

== Death ==
Blazer died on December 9, 1966, at the age of 76.

== The Stuart Blazer Foundation (1952–1975) ==
After 20 years of Ashland area grants, the Stuart Blazer Foundation was terminated in the 1970s. On the recommendation of Paul and Georgia's son Paul Jr. and daughter Doris, one-half of the remaining funds paid for the initial restoration of the Paramount Movie Theater (Paramount Arts Center) in Ashland (associated with Paul Jr.) and one-half of the remaining funds paid for the building and one year's operation of the Ashland Tennis Center before being given to the city of Ashland (associated with Doris).

The Blazer family funded the Blazer Lecture Series at the University of Kentucky in memory of their son Stuart.

== Bibliography ==
Books

- Blazer, D. N.. (October 20, 1922). History of The Underground Railroad of McDonough County, Illinois. Aledo, Illinois: The Times Record Company.
- Frey, John W.; Ide, H. Chandler (2005). A History of the Petroleum Administration for War. Honolulu, Hawaii: University Press of the Pacific. ISBN 1-4102-2195-4.
- Massie, Joseph L. (1960). Blazer and Ashland Oil: A Study in Management. Lexington, Kentucky: University of Kentucky Press. ASIN B0065QBSMM.
- Press, O. Leonard (2008). The KET Story: A Personal Account. Lexington, Kentucky: The Clark Group. ISBN 978-1-883589-89-9.
- Rodengen, Jeffery L. (1998). New Horizons: The Story of Ashland Inc. Fort Lauderdale, Florida: Write Stuff Enterprises, Inc. ISBN 0-945903-42-1.
- St. Clair, James E.; Gugin, Linda C. (2002). Chief Justice Fred M. Vinson of Kentucky – A Political Biography. Lexington: The University Press of Kentucky. ISBN 0-8131-2247-3.
- Scott, Otto J. (1968). The Exception: The Story of Ashland Oil & Refining Company. New York, New York: McGraw-Hill Book Company, Inc. ASIN B000L2HYBK.
- Woodbridge, Hensley Charles (1960). Jesse Stuart: A Bibliography - 1st printing. Harrogate, Tennessee: Lincoln Memorial University Press. ASIN B00AWMWKKO.
