= Summertime Book =

Photography book edited by Joanne Dugan

Summertime is a fine-art photography book about summer, featuring the work of 46 international photographers. It is edited by Joanne Dugan and published by Chronicle Books. Photographers include Martin Parr, Joel Meyerowitz, Steve Giovinco, Julie Blackmon, Kelli Connell, Cig Harvey, Sze Tsung Leong, and Joanne Dugan as well as 38 others. Quotes are by writers such as Marcel Proust, Ranier Maria Rilke, F. Scott Fitzgerald, Walt Whitman and 25 others.
