= Sessler =

Sessler is a German surname. Notable people with the surname include:

- Adam Sessler (born 1973), TV show host
- Gerhard M. Sessler (born 1931), German inventor and professor
- Jerrod Sessler (born 1969), NASCAR driver
- Jonathan Sessler (born 1956), chemistry professor
