= Motexafin lutetium =

Names
- Other names Antrin; Lu texaphyrin; Lu-Tex; Lutetium texaphyrin; Lutrin; Optrin; PCI 0123

Identifiers
CAS Number	246252-04-0
3D model (JSmol)	Interactive image
ChemSpider	31046954
DrugBank	DB05296
PubChem CID	3081907
UNII	0V38NF6N89
- InChI: InChI=1S/C48H66N5O10.2C2H4O2.Lu.H2O/c1-7-35-36(8-2)40-28-42-38(12-10-14-55)34(4)46(53-42)32-50-44-30-48(63-26-24-61-22-20-59-18-16-57-6)47(62-25-23-60-21-19-58-17-15-56-5)29-43(44)49-31-45-33(3)37(11-9-13-54)41(52-45)27-39(35)51-40;2*1-2(3)4;;/h27-32,54-55H,7-26H2,1-6H3;2*1H3,(H,3,4);;1H2/q-1;;;+3;/p-2 Key: WIQKYZYFTAEWBF-UHFFFAOYSA-L
- SMILES: CC([O-])=O.CCC1=C2[N-]C(/C=C3N=C(/C=N/C4=CC(OCCOCCOCCOC)=C(OCCOCCOCCOC)C=C4/N=C/C(C(C)=C/5CCCO)=[N]([Lu+3])C5=C/2)C(C)=C\3CCCO)=C1CC

Properties
Chemical formula	C_{52}H_{72}LuN_{5}O_{14}
Molar mass	1166.136 g·mol^{−1}
- Except where otherwise noted, data are given for materials in their standard state (at 25 °C [77 °F], 100 kPa). verify (what is ?) Infobox references

Motexafin lutetium is a texaphyrin, developed by Pharmacyclics Inc. (proposed trade names Lutrin, Antrin and Optrin)

It is a photosensitiser for use in photodynamic therapy to treat skin conditions and superficial cancers.

It has also been tested for use in photoangioplasty (photodynamic treatment of diseased arteries).

It is photoactivated by 732 nm light which allows greater depth of penetration.

== Clinical trials ==
Phase II clinical trials were in progress in 1999.

A phase I trial for prostate cancer reported in 2009.

As of 2017, this drug is no longer being developed.

== See also ==
- Motexafin gadolinium
