= John Doogan =

Recipient of the Victoria Cross

John Doogan VC
- Born: March 1853; Aughrim, County Galway, Ireland
- Died: 24 January 1940 (aged 86); Folkestone, Kent, England
- Burial place: Shorncliffe Military Cemetery, Folkestone, Kent
- Military career
- Allegiance: United Kingdom
- Branch: British Army
- Rank: Private, later Sergeant
- Units: 1st King's Dragoon Guards
- Conflicts: First Boer War: Battle of Laing's Nek; World War I
- Awards: Victoria Cross

John Doogan VC (Irish: Seán Ó Dubhagáin; March 1853 in Aughrim, County Galway – 24 January 1940 in Folkestone, Kent) was an Irish recipient of the Victoria Cross, the highest and most prestigious award for gallantry in the face of the enemy that can be awarded to British and Commonwealth forces.

== Award ==
Before the First Boer War, Doogan served with the 1st King's Dragoon Guards in the Anglo-Zulu War of 1879 and was present at Ulundi.

He was 27 years old, and a private in the 1st Dragoon Guards (The King's), British Army during the First Boer War when the following deed took place for which he was awarded the VC. He was 27 years old, and a private in the 1st Dragoon Guards (The King's), British Army during the First Boer War when the following deed took place for which he was awarded the VC.

On 28 January 1881 at the Battle of Laing's Nek, South Africa, during the charge of the mounted men, Private Doogan saw that Major William Vesey Brownlow, KDG, had had his horse shot from under him and was dismounted among the Boers. Doogan rode up and, in spite of being severely wounded himself, dismounted and insisted on Major Brownlow taking his horse, receiving another wound while doing so.

Brownlow ultimately rose to the rank of major-general and died in 1926, bequeathing Doogan, his 'former servant', an annuity of £20 a year, (worth around £600 in 2005).

== Further service ==
Doogan left the army by 1882 but he returned to service in World War I as an army recruiter, with the rank of sergeant.

== Civilian career ==
Doogan was working for the General Post Office as a Mail Driver when he was living at Welshpool, Montgomeryshire, Wales at the 1891 Census. In the 1901 Census he had moved into England when he was employed as a butler when living at Church Cottage, East Shenfield, Berkshire. By the 1911 Census he moved to Shropshire, when he lived at Cause Mountain in the parish of Westbury, occupation 'Army pensioner' and later at Stapeley Hill where he was a farmer between 1926 and 1937. He retired from farming to Folkestone, Kent.

== Personal life ==
Doogan was twice married, but only the first marriage was legal. With his first wife Mary he had ten children (his first child born 1882); two sons of theirs died on active service with the army in World War I. She died in August 1924.

His second marriage, later proved invalid, took place on 16 September 1929 at Welshpool Registry Office to Martha Maria Roberts, who was 39 years his junior and had been employed as his housekeeper following his widowhood. She had previously married at Wrexham, on 8 November 1923, David Philip Roberts, who she claimed was dead at the time she met Doogan but turned out to be still alive after the later wedding. She stood trial at Shrewsbury Assizes on 20 February 1930, charged with bigamy of which she was found guilty but was leniently bound over in £10, to be forfeit if she was called for trial again, instead of being sentenced to prison (the usual penalty). Doogan, the innocent party, gave evidence as witness, while the estranged legal husband appeared simply to confirm his identity and their own marriage.

== Death ==
He is buried at Shorncliffe Military Cemetery (also known as the Garrison Cemetery) in Folkestone (Plot V. Grave 1054).

== Victoria Cross ==
His Victoria Cross is displayed at the Queen's Dragoon Guards Regimental Museum in Cardiff Castle, Wales.

== See also ==
- Alan Richard Hill VC
- Ó Dubhagáin
