= Holy City, California =

Unincorporated community in California, United States

Coordinates: 37°09′25″N 121°58′44″W

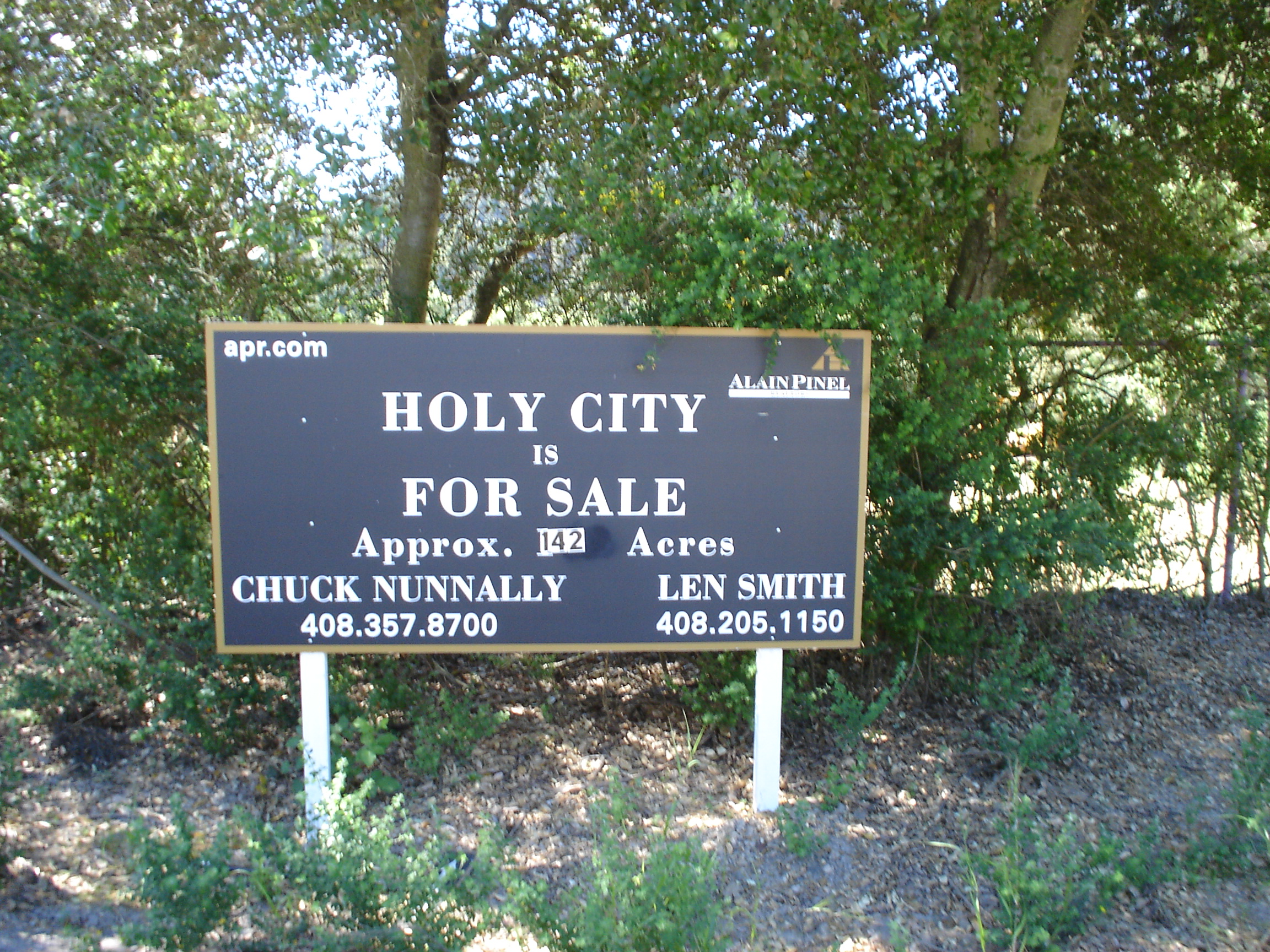
"Holy City is For Sale"

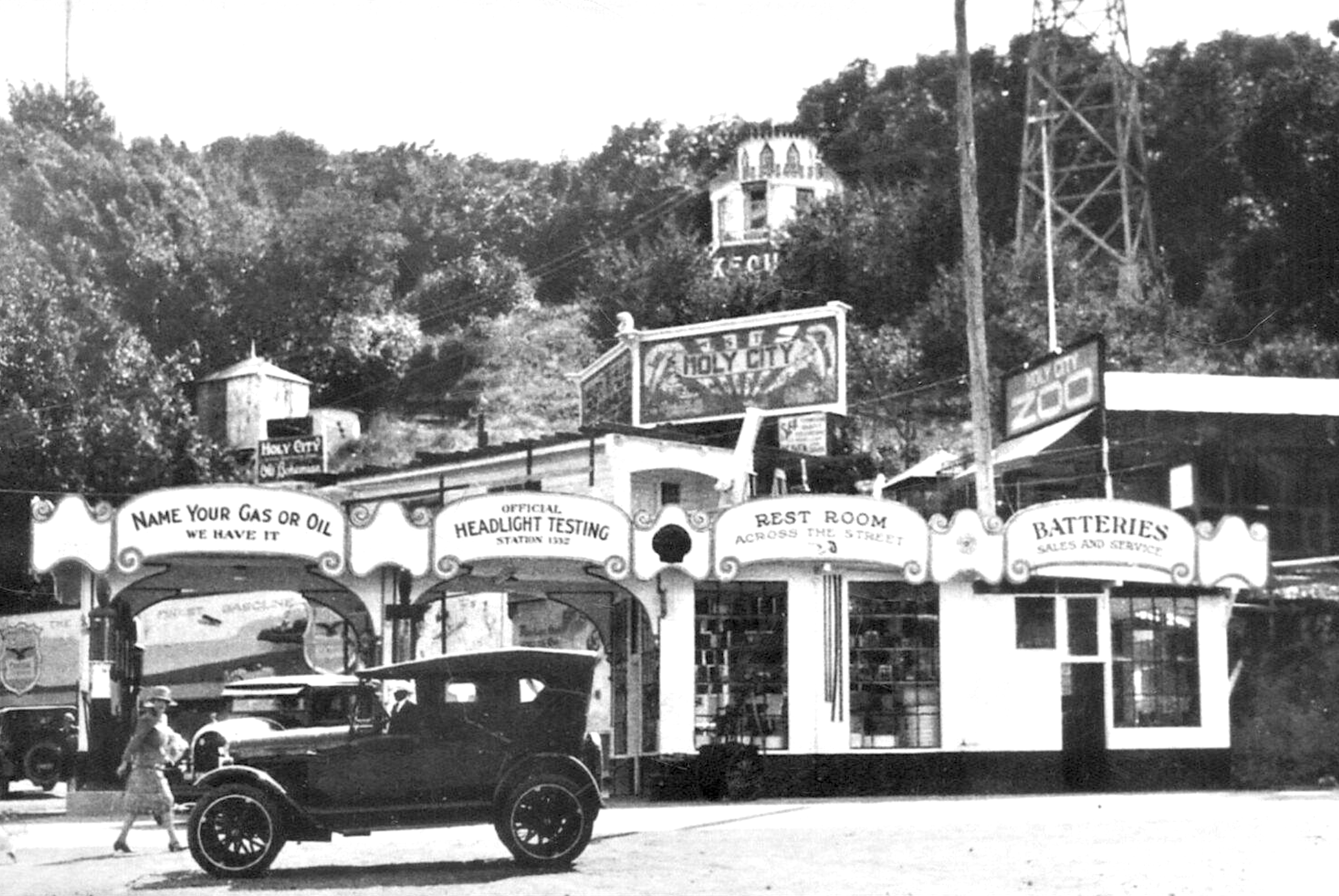
Holy City, California, c. 1924

Holy City is an unincorporated community in Santa Clara County, California, United States. Formerly a white-supremacist cult compound in the 1920s and 1930s, it is now considered a ghost town. The town is located in the Santa Cruz Mountains, off State Route 17 on Old Santa Cruz Highway. It is part of the Lexington Hills census designated place. Its ZIP code is 95026, and its area codes are 408 and 669.

== History ==
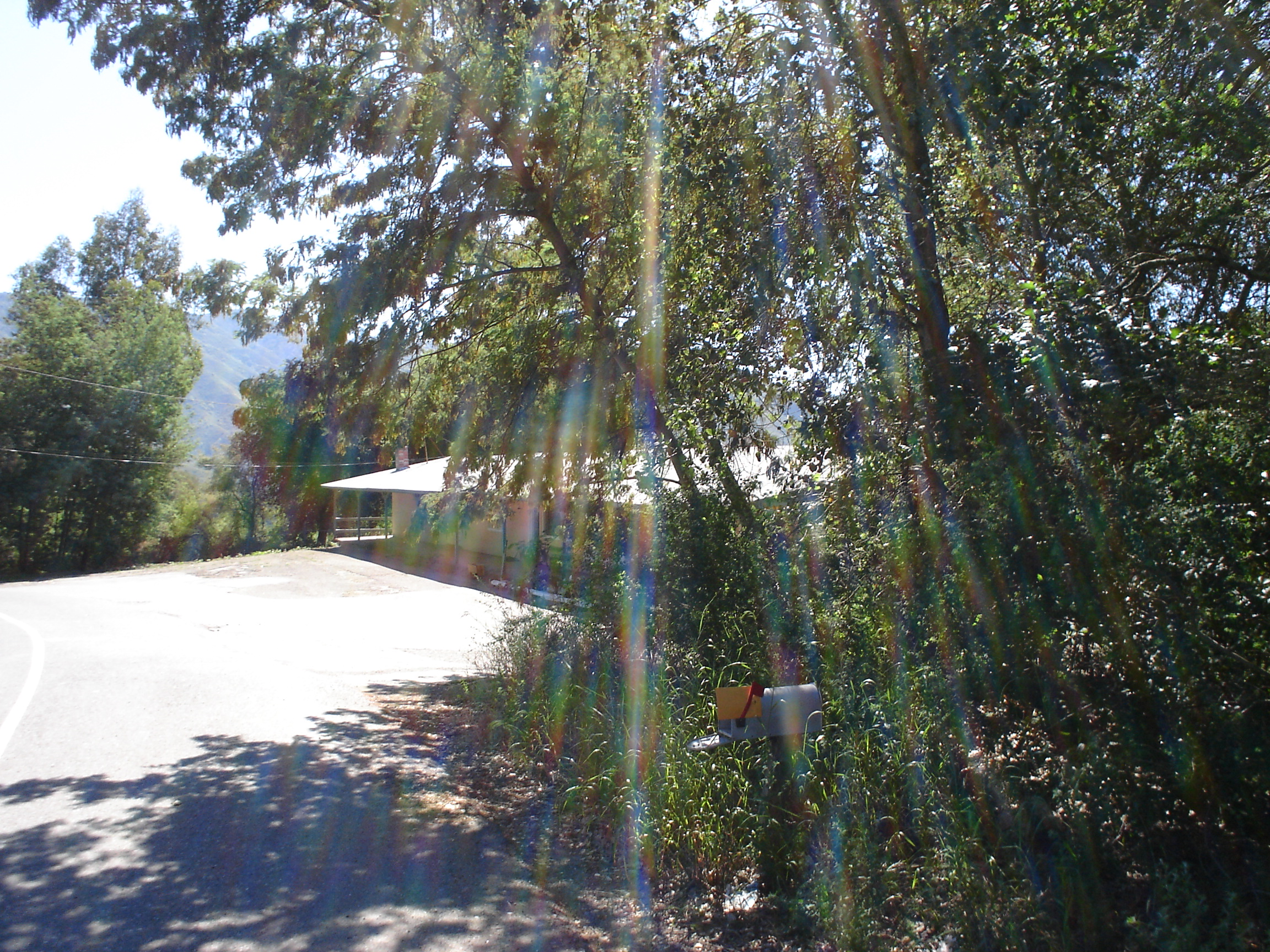
Surviving building at Holy City, 2008

Holy City was founded in 1919 by cult-leader William E. Riker and about thirty of his followers. Calling his ideology "The Perfect Christian Divine Way", Riker preached celibacy, temperance, white supremacy, and segregation of the races and sexes.

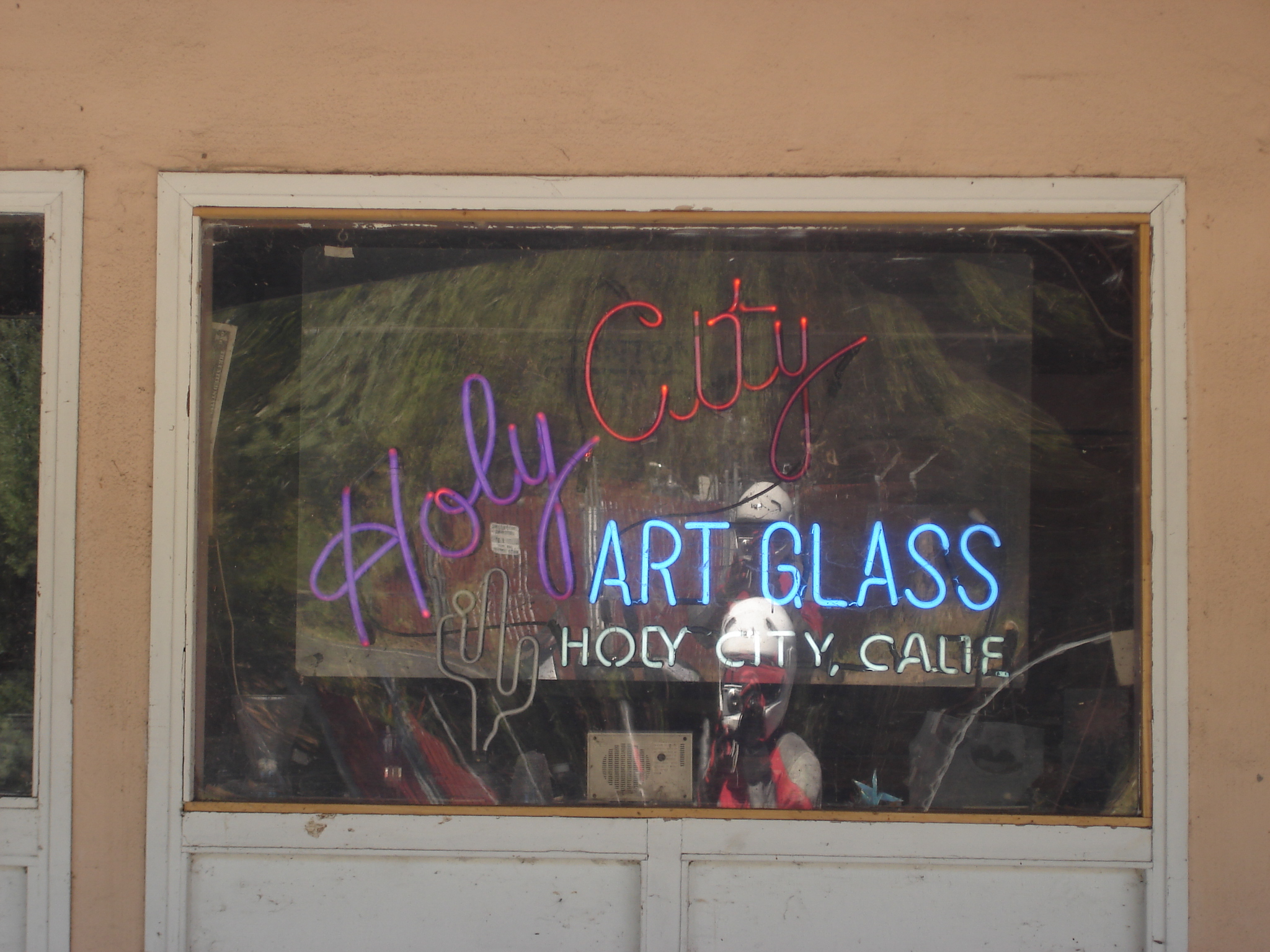
Holy City Art Glass sign, 2008

Riker bought the 142 acres (57 ha) that became Holy City. During the early years, the city was the only development between Santa Cruz and San Jose, known for its strange roadside attraction signs. They attracted tourists to a restaurant, service station, zoo, observatory, peep show, soda stand, barbershop, shoe repair. The town was incorporated in 1926.

The religious community had no church; services were held in Riker's home. By the 1930s the PCDW confirmed disciples probably never numbered more than about 30 people, however the population of Holy City and the surrounding neighborhood peaked at around 300. By 1938, only 75 men and 4 women lived at the site.

=== KFQU ===
A radio station was built in Holy City in 1924 and went on the air on July 7 of that year under the call letters KFQU. In April 1931, KFQU had been operating on a radio frequency far from its assigned frequency. The station went off the air in December 1931, and had its license renewal denied on January 11, 1932, due to "irregularities."

=== Decline of population ===
The town began to further decline in population in the 1940s, with the construction of State Route 17. Holy City was no longer on the main route through the mountains. With the end of the Great Depression, many of Riker's followers were able to find work elsewhere. The town was disincorporated in 1959, and Riker lost control of the property. Several of the buildings mysteriously burned down shortly afterwards.

The developers who purchased the property eventually put it up for sale in 2006, but it lingered on the market until 2016, when it was bought for $6 million by Robert and Trish Duggan. The Duggans are members of the Church of Scientology. Robert Duggan has been referred to as the church's "largest financial supporter" by former Scientology executive Mark Rathbun.
