= Abexinostat =

Names
- IUPAC name 3-[(Dimethylamino)methyl]-N-{2-[4-(hydroxycarbamoyl)phenoxy]ethyl}-1-benzofuran-2-carboxamide
- Other names PCI-24781; CRA-024781

Identifiers
CAS Number	783355-60-2; 783356-67-2 (HCl)
3D model (JSmol)	Interactive image
ChEBI	CHEBI:92223
ChEMBL	ChEMBL2103863
ChemSpider	9924562
ECHA InfoCard	100.241.399
KEGG	D10060
PubChem CID	11749858
UNII	IYO470654U; T1E6TM0SVG (HCl)
CompTox Dashboard (EPA)	DTXSID30229005
- InChI: InChI=1S/C21H23N3O5/c1-24(2)13-17-16-5-3-4-6-18(16)29-19(17)21(26)22-11-12-28-15-9-7-14(8-10-15)20(25)23-27/h3-10,27H,11-13H2,1-2H3,(H,22,26)(H,23,25) Key: MAUCONCHVWBMHK-UHFFFAOYSA-N; InChI=1/C21H23N3O5/c1-24(2)13-17-16-5-3-4-6-18(16)29-19(17)21(26)22-11-12-28-15-9-7-14(8-10-15)20(25)23-27/h3-10,27H,11-13H2,1-2H3,(H,22,26)(H,23,25) Key: MAUCONCHVWBMHK-UHFFFAOYAM
- SMILES: O=C(NO)c3ccc(OCCNC(=O)c2oc1ccccc1c2CN(C)C)cc3

Properties
Chemical formula	C_{21}H_{23}N_{3}O_{5}
Molar mass	397.431 g·mol^{−1}
- Except where otherwise noted, data are given for materials in their standard state (at 25 °C [77 °F], 100 kPa). verify (what is ?) Infobox references

Abexinostat (INN, formerly PCI-24781) is an experimental drug candidate for cancer treatment. It was developed by Pharmacyclics and licensed to Xynomic. As of 2013, it was in Phase II clinical trials for B-cell lymphoma. Pre-clinical study suggests the potential for treatment of different types of cancer as well.

Abexinostat exerts its effect as a pan-histone deacetylase inhibitor and inhibits RAD51, which is involved in repairing DNA double strand breaks.

== Progress ==
Abexinostat has been granted a fast track designation by the FDA for the treatment of patients with relapsed or refractory follicular lymphoma in the fourth-line setting. This designation is significant as it aims to expedite the development and review of drugs intended to treat serious conditions and fill an unmet medical need.

== Research ==
The FORERUNNER conducted a study, a potentially pivotal phase II trial of abexinostat monotherapy in patients with relapsed/refractory follicular lymphoma, in the United States and Europe. In the phase II study, abexinostat showed a modest overall response rate (ORR) in patients with relapsed/refractory non-Hodgkin lymphoma (NHL) and chronic lymphocytic leukemia (CLL), with a notably higher ORR observed in patients with follicular lymphoma. This study involved 100 patients treated with 80 mg of abexinostat twice daily for 14 days of a 21-day cycle. The ORR for follicular lymphoma specifically was 56%, indicating a significant impact on this lymphoma subtype. The study also reported grade ≥3 adverse events in a considerable number of patients, with thrombocytopenia, neutropenia, and anemia being the most frequently reported.

== Safety and efficacy ==
Abexinostat has been characterized by its unique pharmacokinetic profile and oral dosing schedule, allowing for continuous exposure at concentrations required for efficient tumor cell killing.
