= Seán Mór Ó Dubhagáin =

Irish poet

Seán Mór Ó Dubhagáin (died 1372) was an Irish Gaelic poet.

== Background ==
Ó Dubhagáin was among the first notable members of the bardic family Baile Uí Dhubhagáin (Ballyduggan), near Loughrea, County Galway. He was accorded the rank ollamh seanchai (professional historian) to the Uí Maine. His work recorded Irish clan history up until the Norman invasion of Ireland.

== His work ==
One of Ó Dubhagáin's major works is Triallam timcheall na Fodla, a compilation of verse, giving the names of the various tribes, dynasties and territories of the Irish, and the various chiefs before the coming of the Normans. He devotes 152 lines to Meath, 354 to Ulster, 328 to Connacht, and only 56 to Leinster, possibly unfinished at his death.

Triallam is notable in that he writes as though the Norman invasion never occurred, and as if many of the families listed still occupied their original territories. This, however, may reflect his interest as an antiquarian preserving ancient lore.

His contemporary, Giolla na Naomh Ó hUidhrín (died 1420), completed it. In Cambrensis Eversus, John Lynch says that he could not find "any better source than this remarkable poem" concerning the chief Irish families before the coming of the English. Ó Dubhagáin was the author of several other extant poems, all more or less in the nature of a memoria technica, valuable chiefly for their facts about the kings of Ireland and of the provinces. They include:

- Righnaid Laigean Clan Cathaoir, on the families descended from King Cathair Mór of Leinster.
- Cashil cathain clana Mogh, a catalogue of the kings of Cashel from c.300 to 1367.

At least three other poems by him are extant, amounting to several hundreds of verses.

He also composed several rules for determining moveable feasts.

He was the teacher of Adhamh Ó Cianáin; Ó Cianáin composed Leabhar Adhamh Ó Cianáin in or about the 1340s and stated that he wrote it by and for himself, and out of a book of his teacher.

The Annals of Ulster describe him as being aird senchaid na hÉireann (‘chief historian of Ireland’).

== Death and place of burial ==
Ó Dubhagáin made a pilgrimage to St. Columba’s tomb and lived the rest of his life at the priory of St John the Baptist on Loughrea; however other sources state he died at the monastery of Boyle in County Roscommon.

== Others of the Name ==
The surname is generally now rendered Dugan. Notables of the name include:

- Patrick Duggan (10 November 1813 – 15 August 1896) Roman Catholic Bishop of Clonfert.
- Tomás Bacach Ó Dúgáin, (fl. 1848–1858), scribe.
- Maolsheachlainn Ó Dúgáin, (fl. mid-19th century), scribe.
- Liam Ó Dúgáin, (fl. mid-19th century), scribe.
- Winston Dugan, 1st Baron Dugan of Victoria (1876–1951), son of a Dugan of County Galway.
- Seánie Duggan (born 1922), retired Irish sportsman.
- Jeremiah Duggan (1980–2003), British student who died in disputed circumstances linked to the LaRouche movement.

== Sources ==
- A Chronological Account of Nearly Four Hundred Irish Writers, Edward O'Reilly, Dublin, 1820 (reprinted 1970).
- The topographical poems of John O’Duhbhangain and Giolla na Naomh O’Huidrin, ed. with trans, notes, and introductory dissertations by John O'Donovan, Irish arch. and Celtic Society, Dublin, 1862.
- The Surnames of Ireland, Edward MacLysaght, 1978.
- The Great Book of Irish Genealogies, Dubhaltach Mac Fhirbhisigh: Edited, with translation and indices by Nollaig Ó Muraíle Five volumes. Dublin, DeBurca, 2004–2005. ISBN 0-946130-36-1.
- O Dubhagain, Seoan Mor, Aidan Breen, in Dictionary of Irish Biography from the Earliest Times to the Year 2002, p. 431, 2010.
