= Blueprint for Robbery =

1961 film

- Theatrical release poster
- Directed by: Jerry Hopper
- Written by: Irwin Winehouse; A. Sanford Wolf
- Produced by: Bryan Foy
- Starring: J. Pat O'Malley; Robert J. Wilke; Robert Gist; Romo Vincent; Jay Barney; Henry Corden
- Cinematography: Loyal Griggs
- Edited by: Terry O. Morse
- Music by: Van Cleave
- Production company: Paramount Pictures
- Distributed by: Paramount Pictures
- Release date: February 1, 1961
- Running time: 87 minutes
- Country: United States
- Language: English

Blueprint for Robbery is a 1961 American crime film directed by Jerry Hopper and written by Irwin Winehouse and A. Sanford Wolf. The film stars J. Pat O'Malley, Robert J. Wilke, Robert Gist, Romo Vincent, Jay Barney and Henry Corden. The film was released on February 1, 1961, by Paramount Pictures.

== Plot ==
A gang plots the robbery of an armored-car company headquarters. Although the robbery itself goes off as planned, it's not long before the gang members are fighting among themselves over everybody's share of the loot and trying to avoid capture by the police, who are pouring all their resources into capturing the robbers. Based on a real-life 1950 Brinks Armored Car Co. robbery in Boston.

== Cast ==
- J. Pat O'Malley as Pop Kane
- Robert J. Wilke as Capt. Swanson
- Robert Gist as Chips McGann
- Romo Vincent as Fatso Bonelli
- Jay Barney as Red Mack
- Henry Corden as Preacher Doc
- Tom Duggan as District Attorney James Livingston
- Sherwood Price as Gus Romay
- Robert Carricart as Gyp Grogan
- Johnny Indrisano as Nick Tony
- Paul Salata as Rocky
- Joe Conley as Jock McGee
- Marion Ross as Young Woman
- Barbara Mansell as Bar Girl
