= Dugan Aguilar =

Native American photographer (1947–2018)

Dugan Aguilar (1947–2018) was a Native American photographer whose work has been exhibited by major museums. He is "among the first Native photographers to document Native life in Yosemite and California through his own vision."

== Early life ==
Robert Dugan Aguilar was born on August 8, 1947, in Susanville, California, where he grew up. His mother's family was Maidu from the Green River Rancheria and Achomawi living on Hat Creek. His father was Northern Paiute from the Walker River Indian Reservation in Nevada. Aguilar also has some Irish ancestry and used the name Dugan, which means "of dark complexion" in Gaelic.

== Military service ==
Aguilar served in the Marines during the Vietnam War for 13 months. The Maidu community made him a warrior when he returned and gave him a beaded golden eagle feather award. His mother transformed his uniform into a quilt.

== Education ==
Aguilar graduated from California State University, Fresno in 1973. He studied photography at the graduate level at University of California, Santa Cruz; University of California, Davis; and University of Nevada, Reno.

== Art career ==
Ansel Adams was an influence and inspiration to Aguilar. After Aguilar first saw photos by Adams at the Palace of the Legion of Honor in San Francisco in 1973, he decided to learn how to print negatives in a similar way. He took a workshop with Ansel Adams in 1978, and decided to concentrate his career on documenting the Native Americans of California and Nevada. He has used techniques advocated by Adams such as previsualization and use of red filters to create a dark sky.

According to independent curator and scholar Brian Bibby, "Aguilar's work is informed by familiarity and affiliation with his subject."

His entire archive is now housed at the Oakland Museum of California, where a digital archive of his work can be found.

== Death ==
Dugan Aguilar died on October 6, 2018, in Elk Grove, California.

== Exhibitions ==
- Ansel Adams Center for Photography, "Constructing Histories: Portraits of Native Americans", 1998
- Crocker Art Museum, 2001
- Maidu Interpretive Center, Roseville, California, "Honoring Hudessi, 2001
- Autry National Center, "Picturing the People", 2007–2008
- Grace Hudson Museum, 2008
- Oakland Museum of California, 2010
- de Saisset Museum, Santa Clara University, 2010
- Oakland Museum of California, 2024

== Books ==
Dugan Aguilar's photographs have been published in the following books:

- Deeper Than Gold: A Guide to Indian Life in the Sierra Foothills, Heyday Books
- Weaving A California Tradition: A Native American Basketmaker
- The Dirt Is Red Here: Art and Poetry From Native California
- Yosemite: Art of an American Icon
- Remember Your Relations: The Elsie Allen Baskets, Family & Friends
- The Fine Art of California Indian Basketry
- American Indians and the Urban Experience
- Seaweed, Salmon, and Manzanita Cider: a California Indian Feast
- Grass Games & Moon Races: California Indian Games and Toys
- The Green Book of Language Revitalization in Practice
- Precious Cargo: California Indian Cradle Baskets and Childbirth Traditions
- Memory and Imagination: the Legacy of Maidu Indian Artist Frank Day
- She Sang Me A Good Luck Song: The California Indian Photographs of Dugan Aguilar
