= Robert Gist =

American actor (1917–1998)

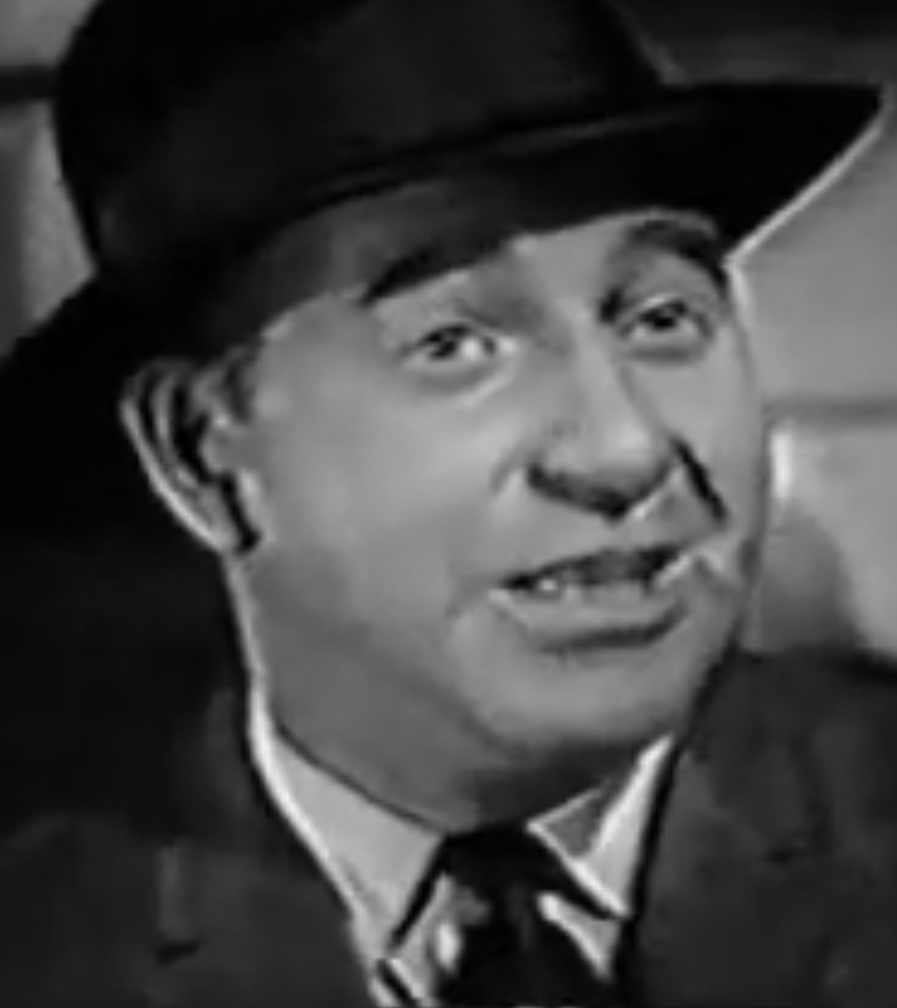
- Gist in an episode of Lock-Up (1961)
- Born: Robert Marion Gist; October 1, 1917; Chicago, Illinois U.S.
- Died: May 21, 1998 (aged 80); Magalia, California U.S.
- Occupations: Actor; film director
- Years active: 1947–1971
- Spouse: Agnes Moorehead (m. 1954; div. 1958)

Robert Marion Gist (October 1, 1917 – May 21, 1998) was an American actor and film director.

== Life and career ==
Gist was reared around the stockyards of Chicago, Illinois, during the Great Depression. Reform school-bound after injuring another boy in a fistfight, Gist instead ended up at Chicago's Hull House, a settlement house originally established by social worker Jane Addams. There he first became interested in acting.

Work in Chicago radio was followed by stage acting roles in Chicago and on Broadway (in the long-running Harvey with Josephine Hull). While acting in Harvey, he made his motion picture debut in 20th Century-Fox's Christmas classic Miracle on 34th Street (1947). Gist was also seen on Broadway in director Charles Laughton's The Caine Mutiny Court Martial (1954) with Henry Fonda and John Hodiak.

While shooting Operation Petticoat (1959), Gist told director Blake Edwards that he was interested in directing. Edwards later hired Gist to helm episodes of the TV series Peter Gunn. Gist also directed episodes of TV shows Naked City, The Twilight Zone, Route 66 and many others.

Gist directed the world premiere of Edna St. Vincent Millay's Conversation at Midnight, produced by Worley Thorne and Susan Davis, in November 1961, on stage, at the Coronet Theatre in Los Angeles. Playing only on the three "off-nights" the theatre was available, Monday through Wednesday, the production was received enthusiastically by critics and audiences, and the small 160-seat theatre was filled to capacity each night for six weeks. With that success, the production moved to the larger Civic Playhouse, where it ran for more than four more months. In the cast were James Coburn, Jack Albertson, Eduard Franz, Hal England, Sandy Kenyon, Frank DeKova and Bill Berger. Three years later, Gist directed another production of the piece on Broadway, at the Billy Rose Theatre, again produced by Thorne, in association with Davis, with some of the first cast. However, notably absent in key roles were James Coburn and Jack Albertson. The "play," a dramatic dialogue of ideas, delivered in various poetic forms, did not do well on Broadway and closed within the week.

== Personal life ==
He was married to actress Agnes Moorehead from 1954 to 1958, although they separated in 1955. They met during the filming of The Stratton Story (1949).

In a 1970 interview with David Frost, Gist discussed his involvement with and commitment to Synanon.

== Filmography ==
- Miracle on 34th Street (1947) - Department Store Window Dresser (uncredited)
- Jigsaw (1949) - Tommy Quigley
- The Stratton Story (1949) - Earnie
- Scene of the Crime (1949) - P.J. Pontiac
- Oh, You Beautiful Doll (1949) - Musician (uncredited)
- A Dangerous Profession (1949) - Roy Collins, a.k.a. Max Gibney
- Wabash Avenue (1950) - Sailor (uncredited)
- I Was a Shoplifter (1950) - Barkie Neff
- Love That Brute (1950) - Rookie Police Officer Wilson (uncredited)
- The Jackpot (1950) - Pete Spooner
- Strangers on a Train (1951) - Det. Leslie Hennessey
- One Minute to Zero (1952) - Maj. Carter
- Angel Face (1953) - Miller
- The Band Wagon (1953) - Hal Benton
- Ford Star Jubilee (1955, TV Series) - Lt. Thomas Keefer
- D-Day the Sixth of June (1956) - Dan Stenick
- Ford Television Theatre (1956, TV Series) - Rev. Wilkerson
- Studio One (1957, TV Series) - Coley Davis
- The Phil Silvers Show (1957, TV Series) - Red Thompson
- Flight (1957, TV Series)
- The Walter Winchell File (1957, TV Series) - Lawton
- The Walter Winchell File "The Boy From Mason City" (1957, TV Series) - Tony Romo
- Richard Diamond, Private Detective (1958, TV Series) - Joe Quincy
- Decision (1958, TV Series) - Dawes
- The Naked and the Dead (1958) - Red
- Gunsmoke (1955-1958, TV Series) - Cam Speegle / Rourke / Rabb Briggs
- Wolf Larsen (1958) - Matthews
- Goodyear Theatre (1959, TV Series) - Ben Moore
- Black Saddle (1959, TV Series) - Milo Dawes
- Al Capone (1959) - Dean O'Banion
- The FBI Story (1959) - Medicine Salesman
- Lock Up (1959, TV Series) - Wayne Powell
- Johnny Ringo (1960, TV Series) - Virgil Kincaid
- Alcoa Theatre (1959, TV Series) - Walter Parker
- Men into Space (1959, TV Series) - Capt. Dan Freer
- Operation Petticoat (1959) - Lt. Watson
- Tales of Wells Fargo (1959, TV Series) - Stanley
- Hawaiian Eye (1960, TV Series) - Barney Mitchell
- The DuPont Show with June Allyson (1960, TV Series) - Lennie Vale
- The Untouchables (1960, TV Series) - Fred 'Caddy' Croner
- Death Valley Days (1960, TV Series) - Aaron Taggert
- Dick Powell's Zane Grey Theater (1960, TV Series)
- General Electric Theater (1960, TV Series) - Committee Chairman
- Hennesey (1960, with Jackie Cooper, recurring role, TV Series) - Dr. Owen King
- Perry Mason (1960, TV Series) - Deputy D.A. Claude Drumm
- Hotel de Paree (1960) - Zack
- Pony Express (1960, TV Series) - Slater
- Sea Hunt (1960) - Captain Olsen
- Blueprint for Robbery (1961) - Chips McGann
- The Aquanauts (1960, TV Series) - Darrell Willoughby
- The Americans (1961, TV Series) - Gen. Charles P. Stone
- The Law and Mr. Jones (1961, TV Series) - District Attorney Tom Starkowski
- Peter Gunn (1958-1961, TV Series) - Cesar Carlyle / Miles Spence / Jason Willows
- The Detectives Starring Robert Taylor (1962, TV Series) - Tully
- Rawhide (1959-1962, TV Series) - Harleck / Sheriff Ed Stockton / Sheriff
- Have Gun - Will Travel (1958-1962, TV Series) - Gavin O'Shea / Sheriff Ernie Backwater / Ike Brennan / Matt Baker / Ben Tyler
- Jack the Giant Killer (1962) - Scottish Captain
- Vacation Playhouse (1965, TV Series) - Ben Moore
- An American Dream (1966)
- Nichols (1971, TV Series) - Gulley (final appearance)

== Teaching ==
Robert Gist was appointed Head of the School of Arts at the Darling Downs Institute of Advanced Education (DDIAE) now the University of Southern Queensland, Toowoomba, Australia from the beginning of 1973 to the end of 1975.

Also, during the 1960s, he made himself into a Hollywood acting coach, forming one of the actors' workshops of that time. In 1964, he used its members—who he named "The Group"—to perform several evenings of Carl Sandburg's poetry. The event was titled The People Yes.

== Students ==
- Philip Barter Cameraman/artist
- Neville Tranter, Australian actor/puppeteer
- Bernd Ullrich, German artist
- Lenore Robbins [nee Lee], Australian dancer and choreographer. Contemporary dancer who, following a brief but highly successful performance career, has influenced a generation of young dancers through a succession of regional dance schools in Queensland, Australia.
