= Dougan (surname) =

Dougan is the surname of the following people:

- Ángel Serafín Seriche Dougan (born 1946), Prime Minister of Equatorial Guinea
- B. H. Dougan (1867–1940), Canadian physician and politician
- Bobby Dougan (1926–2010), Scottish football player
- Brady Dougan (born 1959), American banker
- Brandon Dougan (born 1995), Irish and Vietnamese Healthcare Professional
- Derek Dougan (1938–2007), Northern Ireland football player and manager
- George Dougan (1891–1955), Northern Ireland doctor
- Geraldine Dougan, Northern Ireland politician
- Gordon Dougan, British microbiologist
- Jackie Dougan (1930–1973), British jazz drummer
- John Dougan (1946–2006), New Zealand rugby union player
- John Mark Dougan (born 1972), American police officer and conspiracy theorist
- Lucy Dougan, (1966–), Australian poet
- Luther Lee Dougan (1883–1983), American architect who founded the Houghtaling & Dougan firm
- Martin Dougan (born 1987), Scottish television presenter
- Max Dougan, Scottish football player
- Michael Dougan, British law professor
- Patrick Dougan (1889–?), Scottish football winger
- R. G. Dougan, American football coach
- Rob Dougan (born 1969), Australian composer
- Sue Dougan (born 1974), Northern Irish radio presenter
- Tommy Dougan (1915–1980), Scottish football forward
- Vikki Dougan (born 1929), American model and actress
