= Dougan Round Barn =

- Formerly listed on the U.S. National Register of Historic Places
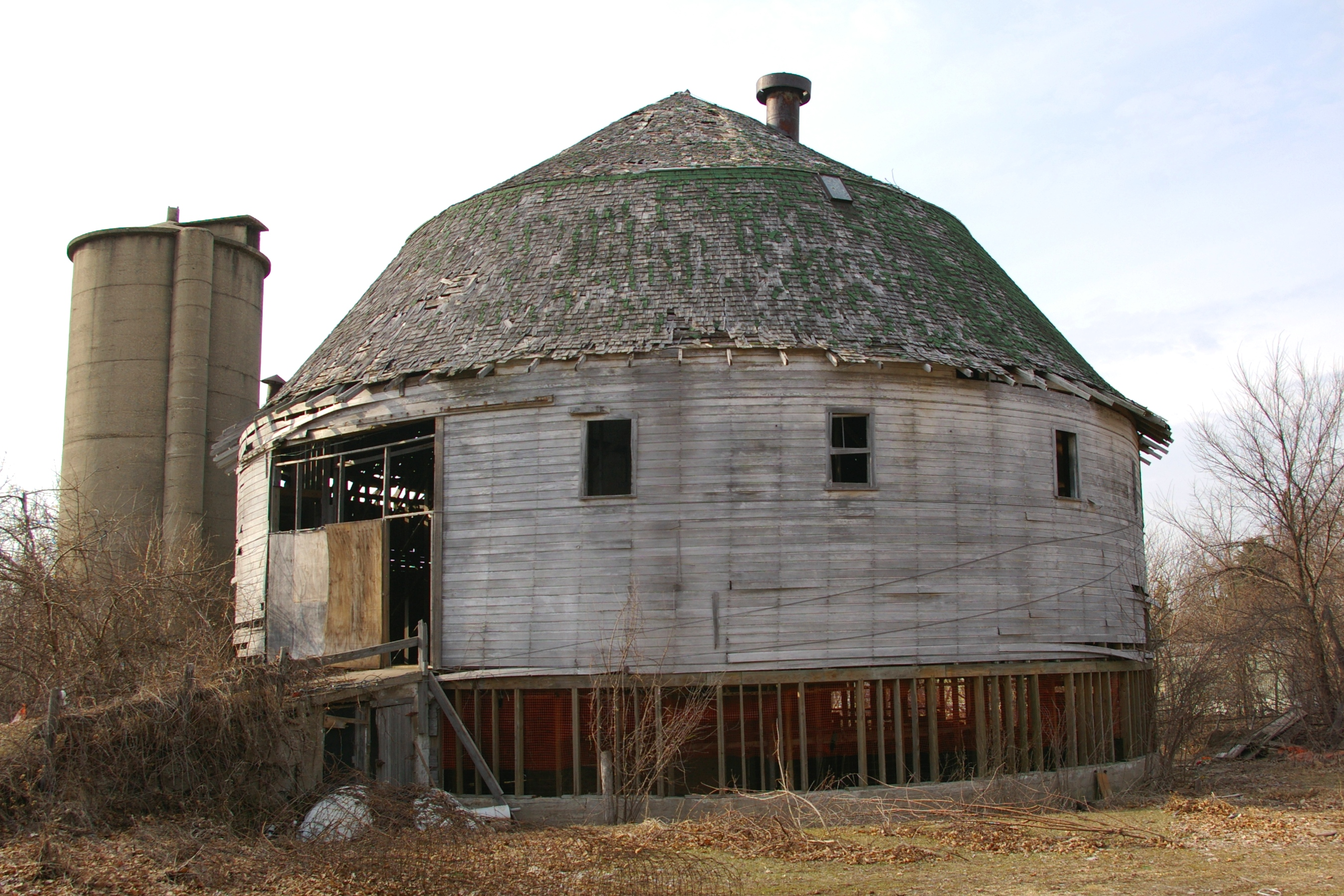
- Before 2012 demolition

- Location within Wisconsin Location within the United States
- Location: 444 West Colley Rd., Beloit, Wisconsin
- Coordinates: 42°30′29″N 88°59′20″W
- Area: less than one acre
- Built: 1911
- MPS: Centric Barns in Rock County TR
- NRHP reference No.: 79000108

Significant dates
- Added to NRHP: June 4, 1979
- Removed from NRHP: January 30, 2014

The Dougan Round Barn in Beloit, Wisconsin, United States, was a round barn that was built in 1911. It was listed on the National Register of Historic Places in 1979. It was demolished in 2012.

The owner of the farm was Wesson J. Dougan, a Methodist pastor who gave up the ministry when he became deaf. He purchased his farm in 1906, established the Dougan Dairy, and carpenter Mark Keller finished building the round barn in 1911.

The barn sat on a concrete foundation, with a diameter of sixty feet, clad in bent horizontal wooden siding. Above that was a conical gambrel roof. A 50-foot poured concrete silo stood at the center of the structure. Cattle were housed in the ground floor, with a hay mow above. The design of the barn incorporated ideas of Professor F.H. King of the University of Wisconsin, with light admitted by many windows and ventilation provided by air ducts, wooden air shafts, and two ventilators through the roof. The barn served as a dairy barn until 1968. At its peak the farm had 120 cows.

A pioneer in scientific farming and dairy management practices, Wesson Dougan was recognized in 1926 by the University of Wisconsin's College of Agriculture and Life Sciences with an Honorary Recognition Award, for combining "so successfully, skillful husbandry with a high type of rural life that his work has been a thoroughly constructive influence in the dairy industry. In this he has achieved high ideals to an unusual degree." When he retired, his son Ronald A Dougan took over the family's three farms, the dairy, the milk delivery business, and the hybrid seed corn business; RA Dougan retired in 1976, having sold his delivery business to a corporate producer. The story of the farm is told in a four-volume series of books by writer and university professor Jacqueline Dougan Jackson, the founder's granddaughter.
