= Motexafin gadolinium =

Chemical compound

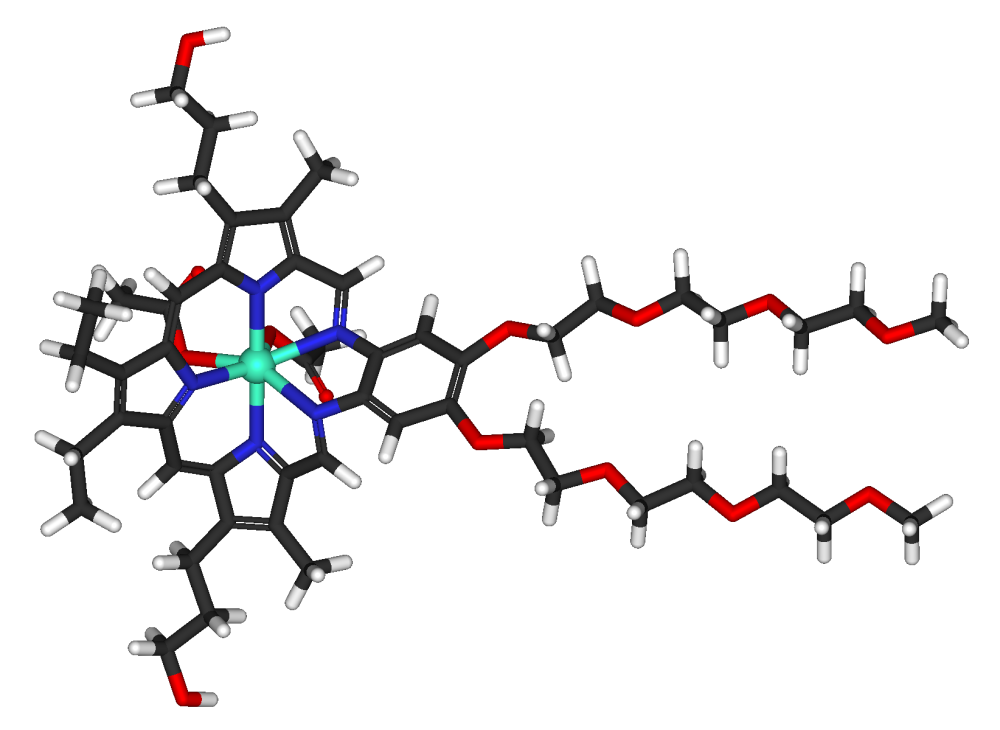

Clinical data
- ATC code: none

Identifiers
- CAS Number: 156436-89-4
- PubChem CID: 158385
- ChemSpider: 139341
- UNII: 6433A42F4F
- KEGG: D05080
- ChEBI: CHEBI:50161
- CompTox Dashboard (EPA): DTXSID4037083

Chemical and physical data
- Formula: C_{52}H_{72}GdN_{5}O_{14}
- Molar mass: 1148.42 g·mol^{−1}
- 3D model (JSmol): Interactive image
- SMILES: CCC1=C(C2=CC3=NC(=CN=C4C=C(C(=CC4=NC=C5C(=C(C(=N5)C=C1[N-]2)CCCO)C)OCCOCCOCCOC)OCCOCCOCCOC)C(=C3CCCO)C)CC.CC(=O)[O-].CC(=O)[O-].[Gd+3]
- InChI: InChI=1S/C48H66N5O10.2C2H4O2.Gd/c1-7-35-36(8-2)40-28-42-38(12-10-14-55)34(4)46(53-42)32-50-44-30-48(63-26-24-61-22-20-59-18-16-57-6)47(62-25-23-60-21-19-58-17-15-56-5)29-43(44)49-31-45-33(3)37(11-9-13-54)41(52-45)27-39(35)51-40;2*1-2(3)4;/h27-32,54-55H,7-26H2,1-6H3;2*1H3,(H,3,4);/q-1;;;+3/p-2/b39-27-,40-28-,41-27-,42-28-,45-31-,46-32-,49-31+,49-43+,50-32+,50-44+;;; Key:VAZLWPAHMORDGR-WRIGXHCHSA-L

Motexafin gadolinium (proposed tradename Xcytrin) is an inhibitor of thioredoxin reductase and ribonucleotide reductase. It has been proposed as a possible chemotherapeutic agent in the treatment of brain metastases.

== History ==
On May 9, 2006, a New Drug Application was submitted to the United States Food and Drug Administration (FDA) by Pharmacyclics, Inc.

In December 2007, the FDA issued a not approvable letter for motexafin gadolinium.

== See also ==
- Motexafin lutetium
