= Stanley Dougan =

American physician, baseball player, sports coach, athletics administrator (1891–1969)

Biographical details
- Born: August 11, 1891; Morgan County, Ohio, U.S.
- Died: November 15, 1969 (aged 78); Honolulu, Hawaii, U.S.

Playing career

Baseball
- 1913: Ohio
- 1914: Winnipeg Maroons
- 1916–1917: Salt Lake City Bees
- Position: Pitcher

Coaching career (HC unless noted)

Football
- 1914–1915: Jamestown

Baseball
- 1917: Saint Mary's

Administrative career (AD unless noted)
- 1914–1916: Jamestown
- 1919: Palo Alto HS (CA)

Head coaching record
- Overall: 6–5–2 (football)

Stanley Dougan (August 11, 1891 – November 15, 1969) was an American physician, baseball player, coach of baseball and football, and athletics administrator. He was the first head football coach at the Jamestown College—now known as the University of Jamestown—in Jamestown, North Dakota, serving for two seasons, from 1914 to 1915, and compiling a record of 6–5–2.

Dougan played college baseball at Ohio University as a pitcher, once striking out 19 batters in a game. He was captain of Ohio baseball team in 1913. In 1914, Dougan was hired as athletic director and football coach at Jamestown. He later played professionally for the Salt Lake City Bees of the Pacific Coast League.

In 1916, Dougan began teaching law and gymnastics at Saint Mary's College of California. In the spring of 1917, he coached the Saint Mary's baseball team. In 1919, Dougan was the athletic director at Palo Alto High School in Palo Alto, California.

Dougan graduated from Stanford University School of Medicine in 1925, and later practiced as a gynecologist and obstetrician in San Jose, California. He died on November 15, 1969, at his home in Honolulu, after suffering a stroke.

== Head coaching record ==
=== Football ===
Year	Team	Overall	Conference	Standing	Bowl/playoffs
Jamestown Jimmies (Independent) (1914–1915)
1914	Jamestown	3–3–1			
1915	Jamestown	3–2–1			
Jamestown:		6–5–2			
Total:		6–5–2			
