= Congressional Medal of Merit =

American honor

The Congressional Medal of Merit is the United States Congress' award for young Americans. This award is for ages 14 to 23. It is intended to honor individuals who have shown outstanding achievement in areas such as academics and service. The award is presented by a member of congress to the individual regardless of partisanship.

== History ==
The Congressional Medal of Merit was established in 1942 by President Franklin D. Roosevelt. It was first created to honor citizens of the United States for their services during World War II. In present times a member of the United States Congress may award the Congressional Medal of Merit to their constituents as a way to honor citizens for their contributions, leadership, and achievements.
