= Tomás Bacach Ó Dúgáin =

Irish scribe

Tomás Bacach Ó Dúgáin, Irish scribe, fl. 1848–1858.

Thomas Bacach was a schoolteacher in Galway; he was also a songwriter.

William Mahon devotes pages 636-37 of his article (cited below) on this scribe. He was a descendant of the same family as Seán Mór Ó Dubhagáin (died 1372 and was one of three related scribes living in Claregalway in the first half of the 19th century. The others were Liam Ó Dúgáin and Maolsheachlainn Ó Dúgáin. Their ancestors were hereditary historians, poets, and scribes. The surname is now rendered as Duggan or Dugan.

== Sources ==
- The Surnames of Ireland, Edward MacLysaght, Dublin, 1978.
- Scríobhaithe Lámhscríbhinní Gaeilge I nGaillimh 1700-1900, William Mahon, in "Galway:History and Society", 1996
