= Jonathan Sessler =

American chemist (born 1956)

Jonathan L. Sessler
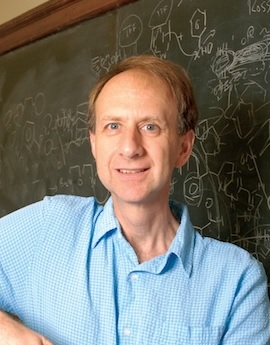
- Jonathan L. Sessler
- Born: 20 May 1956 (age 70); Urbana, Illinois
- Citizenship: American
- Education: BS at University of California, Berkeley; PhD at Stanford University; Postdoc at Louis Pasteur University
- Alma mater: University of California; Stanford University
- Known for: Synthesis of Porphyrins, Synthesis and anticancer studies of Texaphyrin
- Scientific career
- Workplaces: University of Texas at Austin
- Thesis: (1982)
- Doctoral advisor: James P. Collman

Jonathan Sessler (born 20 May 1956 in Urbana, Illinois) is a professor of chemistry at The University of Texas at Austin. He is notable for his pioneering work on expanded porphyrins and their applications to biology and medicine. He is a co-founder of Pharmacyclics, Inc., a company that works with expanded porphyrins, and Anionics, Inc., which develops anion recognition chemistry. Pharmacyclics was sold to AbbVie for $21 billion in 2015.

== History and career ==
Sessler received his Bachelor of Science in Chemistry in 1977 from the University of California, Berkeley and his Ph.D. in chemistry in 1982 from Stanford University. He continued as a post-doctoral fellow at L'Université Louis Pasteur, and worked in Kyoto, Japan before becoming an assistant professor of chemistry at The University of Texas at Austin in 1984.

He is a three-time Hodgkin's Lymphoma cancer survivor. He was treated for cancer at Stanford University Medical Center during work on his Ph.D. Discussions with his colleagues regarding possible treatments eventually led to the discovery of so-called "texaphyrin" molecules, named as such due a semblance to the shape of the five-pointed star in the State flag of Texas., 10-Gallon Molecule Stomps Tumors In 1996, Sessler described possible uses of these compounds in medicine in the Proceedings of the National Academy of Sciences journal. He formed a company, Pharamcyclics, Inc., with Dr. Richard A. Miller whom treated him for his cancer. His company, which went public in 1995, licensed the technology behind "texaphyrins" from the university to develop commercial and medical uses for the molecules. The company was later acquired by Bob Duggan in the year 2008 as he became the largest shareholder of the company.

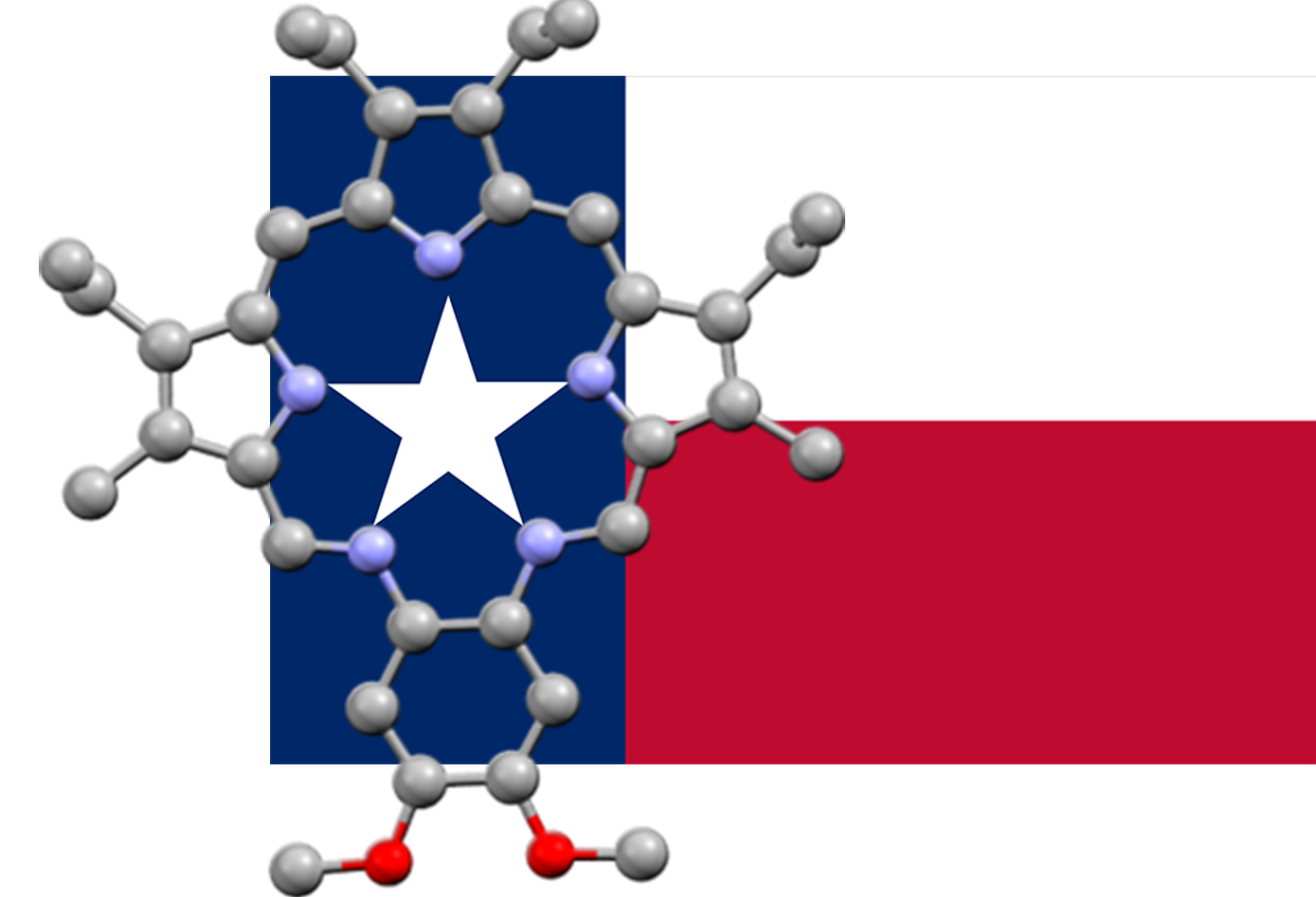
Texaphyrin core Nitrogen superimpose with 5 points of the star featured on the state flag of Texas

Sessler has written extensively, authoring or co-authoring over 600 publications. In addition, he has co-authored two books and edited another two. He holds more than 70 U.S. patents. Dr. Sessler has received many awards and much recognition, as a Sloan Fellow (1999), Fellow of the AAAS (1999), Dreyfus Teacher-Scholar (1999), ACS Cope Scholar (1999), recipient of the JSPS and Alexander von Humboldt Senior Fellowships (1999), and winner of the Izatt-Christensen Award (1999).

Sessler has participated in hosting chemistry circuses on the UT campus.University Events | What Starts Here Changes the World, UT DISCOVERY MAGAZINE v15n4 Science Fun Day photo These circuses are held for different grade levels from elementary to college, and aim to expose students to "fun" aspects of chemistry. Sessler has also lectured on how the disease Porphyria, caused by a deficiency in porphyrins, may be related to the origin of myths about vampires and werewolves.

In 2021, he was elected member of the U. S. National Academy of Sciences.
