= Michael Dugan =

Michael Dugan, Mike or Mickey Dugan may refer to:

- Michael Dugan (general) (born 1937), chief of staff of United States Air Force
- Michael Dugan (poet) (1947–2006), Australian poet
- Michael T. Dugan (born 1957), accounting academic
- Mike Dugan (Georgia politician) (born 1956), American politician in Georgia
- Mickey Dugan, see The Yellow Kid
- Michael Dugan, fictional president of the United States in the video game Command & Conquer: Red Alert 2
- Mike Dugan, a character in the DC streaming series Stargirl

== See also ==
- Mike Duggan (born 1958), American politician and lawyer in Michigan
- Mike Duggan (Canadian politician), Canadian politician in Gatineau
- Michael Duggan, American TV show producer
