= James Dugan =

James Dugan may refer to:

- James Dugan (director) (1898–1937), American film director
- James Dugan (historian) (1912–1967), American historian and writer
- James P. Dugan (1929–2021), New Jersey State Senator
