= Trish Duggan =

American glass artist and philanthropist

- Born: Patricia Joy Hagerty
- Occupations: Philanthropist and glass artist
- Spouse: Robert Duggan (?–2017)

Patricia J. "Trish" Duggan is an American glass artist and philanthropist. In 2025, she was appointed to the board of the John F. Kennedy Center for the Performing Arts by the second Trump administration. Along with her former husband, Robert Duggan, she is a prominent Scientologist.

== Personal life ==
She was married to Robert Duggan until 2017. They met when both were students at University of California, Santa Barbara. They had a total of eight children; one biological daughter, the others adopted, and all of whom were given a name beginning with the letter "D". One son died from cancer in 1997.

In 2016 Robert and Trish Duggan bought Holy City, California.

== Philanthropy ==
In 2019 she was the top donor to causes associated with the Church of Scientology.

In 2020 she became one of the top donors to groups associated with the Republican Party. In 2020 Duggan and an associated trust gave to the Donald Trump-aligned super PAC America First Action. Prior to 2020 Duggan had not been publicly active in political giving however she attended the First inauguration of Donald Trump. In the 2020 cycle Duggan also donated to Trump Victory fund and the Republican National Committee.

In 2023 Duggan donated to Donald Trump's super PAC MAGA Inc.

In 2024 she gave to Robert F. Kennedy Jr. aligned political group, MAHA Alliance.

In 2025 she was appointed to the board of trustees of the John F. Kennedy Center for the Performing Arts. The new board elected Trump as their chairman.

== Art ==
Duggan is an art collector. She is also an artist practicing glass art. She is the primary backer of the Imagine Museum in St. Petersburg, Florida which opened in 2018. Many of Duggan's works are on display at the museum.
