= Petroleum Administration for Defense Districts =

U.S. administrative subdivision

Subdistrict I-A (New England) Subdistrict I-B (Central Atlantic) Subdistrict I-C (Lower Atlantic) PADD II (Midwest) PADD III (Gulf Coast) PADD IV (Rocky Mountain) PADD V (West Coast)

The United States is divided into five Petroleum Administration for Defense Districts, or PADDs. These were created during World War II under the Petroleum Administration for War to help organize the allocation of fuels derived from petroleum products, including gasoline and diesel (or "distillate") fuel. Today, these regions are still used for data collection purposes.

The Petroleum Administration for War was established in 1942 by executive order, and abolished in 1946. The districts are now named for the later Petroleum Administration for Defense which existed during the Korean War. It was established by the Defense Production Act of 1950, then abolished in 1954, with its role taken over by the United States Department of the Interior's Oil and Gas Division. The US government divided the US into five Petroleum Administration for Defense Districts (PADDs). These were created during World War II to help organize the allocation of fuels, including gasoline and diesel fuel. Today, these regions are still used for data collection purposes.

== PAD Districts ==
- PADD I (East Coast) is composed of the following three subdistricts:
  - Subdistrict A (New England): Connecticut, Maine, Massachusetts, New Hampshire, Rhode Island, and Vermont.
  - Subdistrict B (Central Atlantic): Delaware, District of Columbia, Maryland, New Jersey, New York, and Pennsylvania.
  - Subdistrict C (Lower Atlantic): Florida, Georgia, North Carolina, South Carolina, Virginia, and West Virginia.
- PADD II (Midwest): Illinois, Indiana, Iowa, Kansas, Kentucky, Michigan, Minnesota, Missouri, Nebraska, North Dakota, South Dakota, Ohio, Oklahoma, Tennessee, and Wisconsin.
- PADD III (Gulf Coast): Alabama, Arkansas, Louisiana, Mississippi, New Mexico, and Texas.
- PADD IV (Rocky Mountain): Colorado, Idaho, Montana, Utah, and Wyoming.
- PADD V (West Coast): Alaska, Arizona, California, Hawaii, Nevada, Oregon, and Washington.
- PADD VI (Caribbean): US Virgin Islands and Puerto Rico.
- PADD VII (Pacific): Guam, American Samoa, and the Northern Mariana Islands.

== See also ==
- Oil and gas law in the United States
