= Pharmacyclics =

American biopharmaceutical company

Pharmacyclics LLC
- Company type: Subsidiary
- Traded as: Nasdaq: PCYC
- Industry: Biopharmaceutical
- Founded: 1991; 35 years ago
- Founders: Jonathan Sessler, Richard A. Miller
- Headquarters: Sunnyvale, California
- Area served: Worldwide
- Key people: Robert Duggan, former CEO and Chairman
- Revenue: ▲US$235 million (2013)
- Operating income: ▲US$110 million (2013)
- Net income: ▲US$86.1 million (2013)
- Total assets: ▲US$1.06 billion (2013)
- Total equity: ▲US$829 million (2013)
- Parent: AbbVie
- Website: pharmacyclics.com

Pharmacyclics LLC is an American biopharmaceutical company based in Sunnyvale, California. It is primarily focused on the development of cancer therapies. In 2017, Xynomic Pharmaceuticals acquired all global rights to Abexinostat, Pharmacyclics' primary commercial product.

== Acquisition by AbbVie ==
In March 2015, Chicago-based biopharmaceutical firm AbbVie announced it would acquire Pharmacyclics, as well as its lead anti-cancer compound ibrutinib (Imbruvica) for $21 billion. Imbruvica, the company’s flagship therapy, later became one of the most prescribed treatments for chronic lymphocytic leukemia (CLL). As part of the deal, AbbVie paid $261.25 per share in a mixture of both cash and AbbVie equity. The merger closed in mid-2015.

Duggan received over $3.55 billion from the sale of Pharmacyclics to AbbVie in "one of the biggest paydays ever from the buyout of a publicly held company."
