= Robert Duggan (venture capitalist) =

American businessman and prominent Scientologist

Bob Duggan
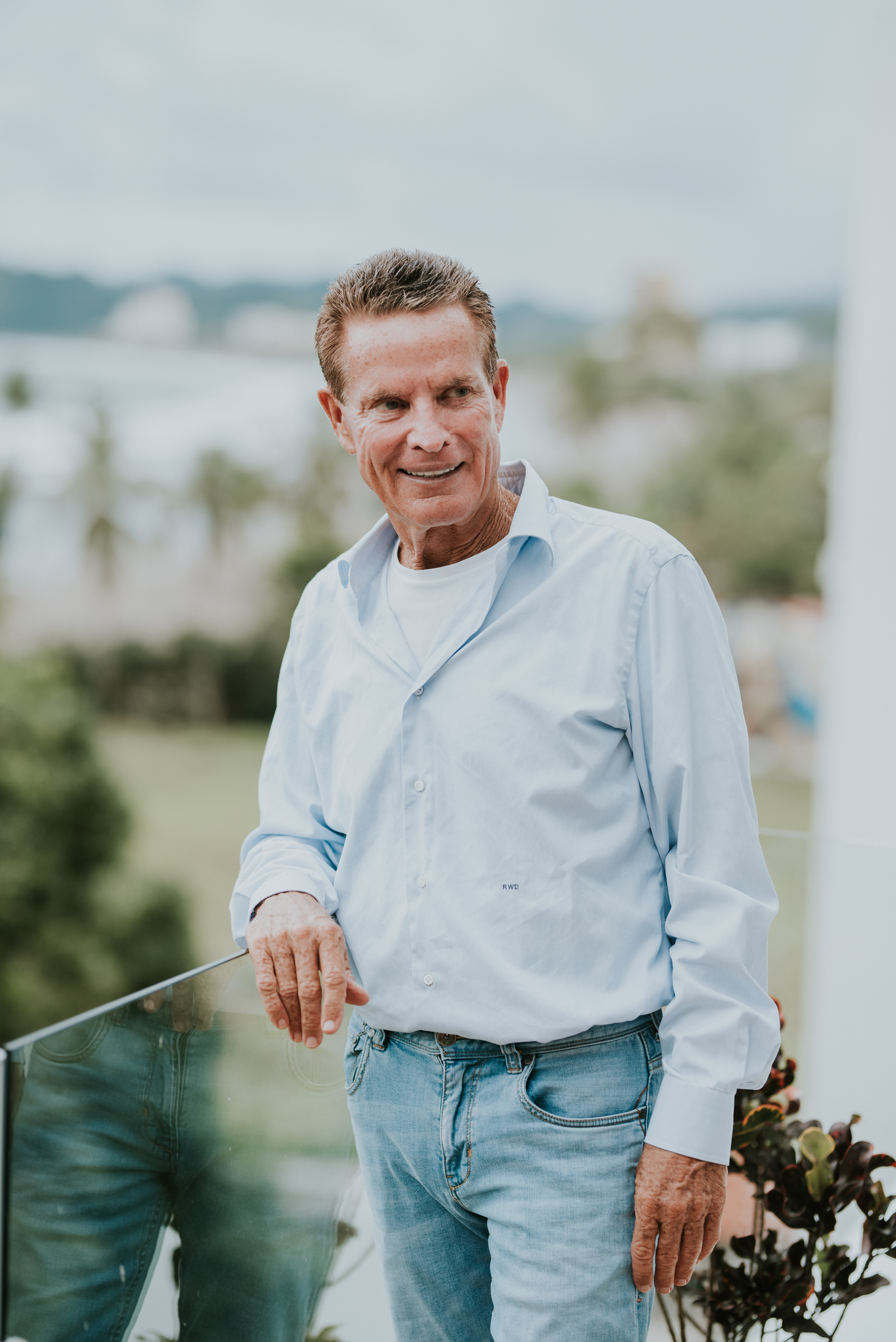
- Born: Robert W. Duggan; 1944 or 1945 (age 81–82); Oakland, California, US
- Education: University of California, Santa Barbara; University of California, Los Angeles
- Occupation: Businessman
- Title: CEO, Summit Therapeutics
- Term: 2020-
- Children: 8
- Honours: Congressional Medal of Merit
- Website: robertduggan.com

Robert W. Duggan (born 1944) is an American billionaire entrepreneur, biotech and health care executive. He is the former CEO of biopharmaceutical company Pharmacyclics and was previously CEO of surgical systems maker Computer Motion from 1997 to 2003. Duggan is the majority shareholder and CEO of Pulse Biosciences and Summit Therapeutics.

== Early life ==
Robert Duggan was born in Oakland, California, in 1944; the third of five children. His father was an Irish immigrant who became an industrial engineer in the U.S; his mother was a nurse. According to Robert Duggan in Investopedia, “We [our family] made about $800 a month…The last couple days of every month we scrambled around the house looking for lost quarters, dimes, and nickels [to pay the bills]."

Duggan attended St. Francis High School in Mountain View, California, where he was the quarterback of the school football team, as well as its captain. He is recorded as saying “I captained my football team, I'd get in a huddle, and I'd go: ‘Guys – sacrifice your body. We're behind in this game. We are not losing this game. Get out there. Sacrifice your body. Win the game guys. There's nothing more important in life right now than winning this game.'"

After graduating cum laude from St. Francis High School, he attended the University of California, Santa Barbara, and the University of California, Los Angeles, majoring in business and economics. At UCSB he met Herbert C. Kay, a Wharton fellow and acclaimed Stanford graduate, who became his mentor.

Duggan's first business venture was mowing lawns as a teenager in California. He said this about the lawn mowing enterprise to Entrepreneur.com, "as a teenager, my first business was mowing lawns. My goal as a teenager was not to make the Forbes 400 list but to simply make enough money to get myself through college. When I was mowing lawns I realized when I went that extra mile to make a difference for the better, the property owner wanted to tip me or give me more work. It wasn't even very difficult. Sometimes it was a simple smile, extra care to make sure a hedge was edged perfectly, or taking the time when I was done to have the owner walk the property with me admiring my work."

== Career ==
=== Sunset Designs ===
Duggan's first company, Sunset Designs, supplied Jiffy Stitchery kits to consumers, helping them create their own high-quality stitched projects at home. He invested $100k in Sunset Designs, then sold it to British consumer-goods giant Reckitt Benckiser Group for $15 million in the mid-1980s. More than 7,000 retail locations sold Jiffy Stitchery kits, giving the company an 80% market share.

=== Paradise Bakery ===
Duggan, the Patterson Brothers and Carter Holmes were partners in Paradise Bakery & Café, which opened in 1976. Paradise Bakery distributed cookies to major corporations such as McDonald's, Kentucky Fried Chicken, and Disney World. Duggan developed the recipe for the “Chocolate Chip Chipper”. The bakery was sold to Chart House in 1987, and is now owned by Panera Bread. The Paradise Bakery in downtown Aspen is still in operation as of 2020, and maintains the Paradise Bakery name.

=== Communication Machinery Corp ===
Duggan founded Communication Machinery Corp (CMC), which was the third company in the world to create and sell Ethernet Node Processors, a computer networking technology utilized for establishing local area networks (LAN) and providing a gateway to the internet. The corporation was sold to Rockwell International for $45 million.

=== Government Technology Services ===
In the 1980s, Duggan founded Government Technology Services, Inc (GTSI), and sold new computer technologies and services, primarily to government agencies. GTSI was an early pioneer in the new field that would become e-commerce. GTSI engaged in some notable firsts: the first browser-based government contract catalog, the first-ever use of a credit card on the internet (as part of a deal with NASA) in 1995, and the first government IT portal.

In 1996 GTSI was the largest reseller to the U.S. Government of microcomputer software and Unix hardware. Under Duggan's leadership, GTSI grew from an $8 million company to over $600 million in revenue, ultimately being acquired by UNICOM Global in 2012.

=== Metropolis Media ===
In the mid-1990s, Duggan and his son Demian helped found Metropolis Media, an organization with the purpose of helping formerly communist countries transition to free-market societies and to enable consumer advertising. As chairman, as well as investing the $3 million initial financial capital, Duggan oversaw the organization's spread to outdoor marketing projects throughout Eastern Europe: Croatia, Slovenia, Serbia, Bosnia and Macedonia. Capital Research purchased the enterprise for over $45 million. Metropolis Media is now owned by French advertising giant JCDecaux Group.

=== Computer Motion (Intuitive Surgical) ===
Duggan was a founding shareholder of Computer Motion (now Intuitive Surgical), which develops the technology used in robot-assisted surgery, aimed at improving patients' experiences by reducing the degree of invasion during surgery. The company worked to accomplish "patient and physician-friendly" robotic surgery - a term coined by Duggan - who led the company as chairman from 1990 to 2003. On 7 Sept, 2001, Computer Motion conducted the "Lindbergh Operation" - the first transatlantic telesurgical operation. It was performed by surgeons in New York on a patient in France.

=== Pharmacyclics ===
Pharmacyclics is a pharmaceutical company primarily focused on the development of cancer therapies. From 2008 to 2015 Duggan was the chairman and CEO of Pharmacyclics, as well as its largest investor. The company then focused its research on ibrutinib (branded as Imbruvica), a B cell cancer drug highly effective for treating chronic lymphocytic leukemia (CLL), the most common form of adult leukemia. Imbruvica went on to be approved for the treatment of four different types of blood cancer.

Duggan invested in Pharmacyclics when it was valued at between $1 and $3 per share; he negotiated its sale to AbbVie at $261.25 per share in 2015, in a deal valued at $21 billion. He received $3.5 billion from the sale of Pharmacyclics to AbbVie in "one of the biggest paydays ever from the buyout of a publicly held company." As CEO and chairman of Pharmacyclics from 2008 to 2015, Duggan had opted not to receive compensation from the company.

Investopedia says that between 2008 and 2015, "Duggan saved Pharmacyclics and turned it into a billion‐dollar company with more than 500 employees."

=== Pulse Biosciences ===
Since November 2017, Duggan has been chairman of Pulse Biosciences. Pulse develops bioelectric technology, such as Nano-Pulse Stimulation (NPS) technology, which has applications including cosmetic and medical conditions. For example, it has the potential to quickly and painlessly remove skin lesions (like melanomas). As of February 2017, he owned a 15.4% stake in the company.

=== Summit Therapeutics ===
After having been a director since December 2019, Duggan was appointed as CEO of Summit Therapeutics, a clinical-stage drug development company focused on new mechanism antibiotics, in spring 2020. He is the company's leading shareholder and its CEO. Summit is focused on developing Ivonescimab, a potential new treatment for Non-small-cell lung cancer

=== Genius Inc. ===
Duggan is the founder of Genius Inc., a company which coaches organizations and executives on "the 24 characteristics of geniuses." The organization's program is based on the "24 Characteristics of Genius" described by Dr. Alfred Barrios in 1980.

=== Duggan Investments ===
Duggan invests in fields such as cancer treatment, anti-microbial therapeutics, human longevity and anti-aging technologies, and stem cell research.

In 2016 Robert and Trish Duggan bought Holy City, California.

== Philanthropy ==
Duggan is on the board of trustees at UCSB, and has funded educational endeavors such as athletic departments, the UC Santa Barbara Gold Circle Society and two faculty chair positions (in Mathematics and in Life and Physical Sciences). He has made foundational donations to new departments such as the Institute for Energy Efficiency and the XIV Dalai Lama Chair in Tibetan Buddhism and Cultural Studies.

== Political activity ==
Duggan contributed $817,800 to Donald Trump's 2020 presidential campaign.

== Awards and recognition ==
Duggan has received numerous awards and acknowledgements for his work in the fields of technology, entrepreneurship, philanthropy, and activism. He received a Congressional Medal of Merit from Ron Paul, and in 2000 was made a Knight of the Legion of Honor by French President Jacques Chirac. He also received a Key to the City for the city of Shanghai, China.

Duggan received the 2016 Venky Narayanamurti Entrepreneurial Leadership Award from the UCSB College of Engineering for his work in technological entrepreneurship.

== Personal life ==
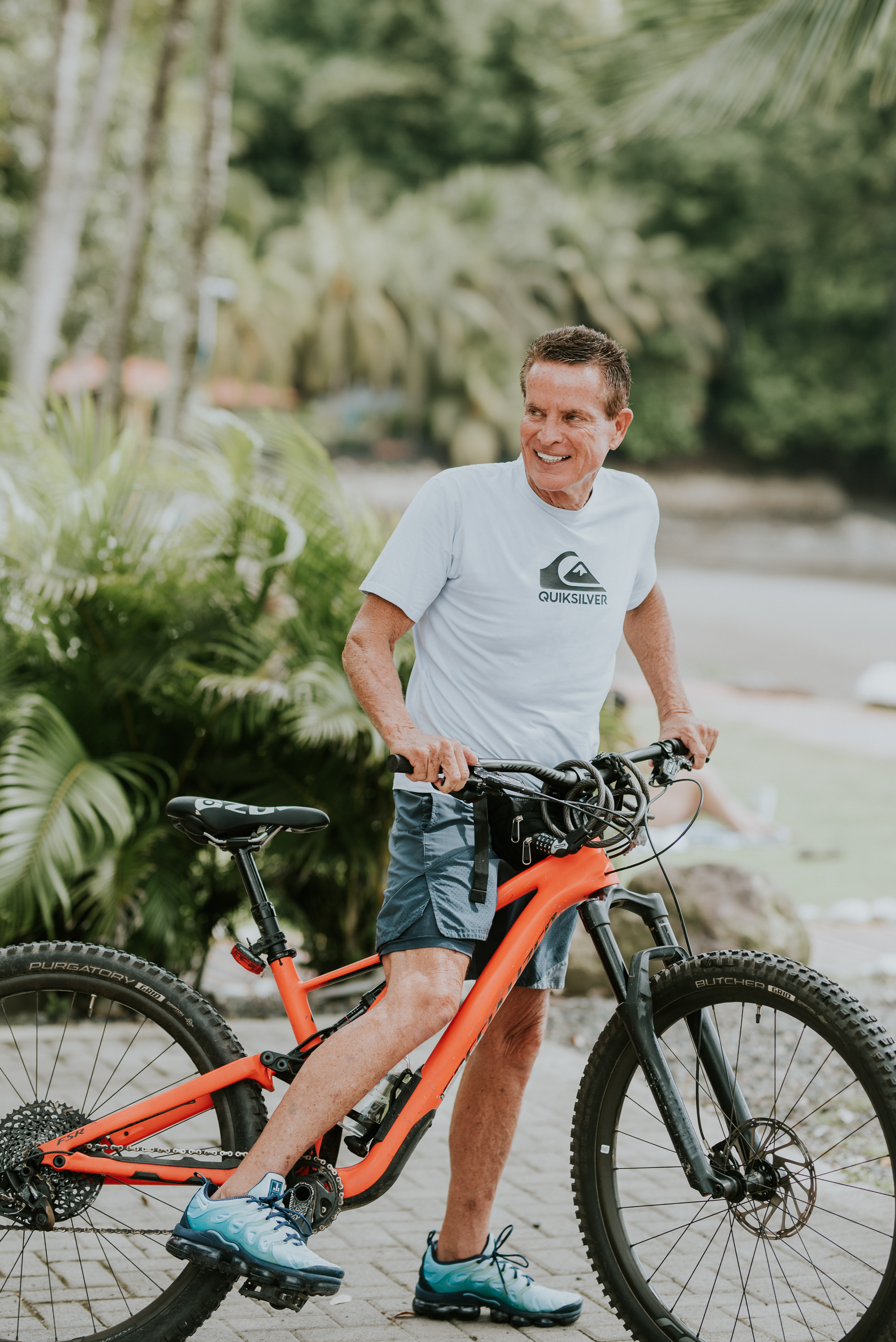
Bob Duggan with his mountain bike in Costa Rica

Bob Duggan was married to Patricia J. "Trish" Hagerty, whom he met when both were students at UCSB. They had a total of eight children; one biological daughter, the others adopted, and all of whom were given a name beginning with the letter "D". One son passed away from cancer in 1997. In 2017, Trish Duggan divorced her husband Bob.

Duggan is an avid surfer, who began surfing in Santa Cruz, California, later travelling Hawaii and to countries such as Costa Rica, Nicaragua, and Mexico. His children have often accompanied him, learning their early surfing skills as young as three years old.

Duggan and his ex-wife are members of the Church of Scientology. Duggan has been referred to as the church's largest donor, and in 2019 Duggan confirmed that the amount he has donated "far exceeds the $360 million figure he cited to Forbes magazine in 2016".

In 2020, Forbes ranked Duggan No. 378 on the Forbes 400 list of the richest people in America.
