= Liam Ó Dúgáin =

Irish scribe

Liam Ó Dúgáin was an Irish scribe who flourished in the mid-19th century.

A native of Claregalway, Ó Dúgáin was a relation of Tomás Bacach Ó Dúgáin and Maolsheachlainn Ó Dúgáin, all of the same parish. His scribal work consists of songs.

== See also ==
- Seán Mór Ó Dubhagáin (died 1372), Gaelic-Irish poet.
- Patrick Duggan (10 November 1813 – 15 August 1896), Roman Catholic Bishop of Clonfert.
- Seánie Duggan (1922–2013), retired Irish sportsman.
- Jeremiah Duggan (1980–2003), British student who died in disputed circumstances linked to the LaRouche movement.
