= Robert Dugan =

Australian cricketer (born 1959)

Personal information
- Born: 10 August 1959 (age 67); Broken Hill, New South Wales, Australia
- Source: Cricinfo, 31 October 2018

Robert Dugan (born 10 August 1959) is an Australian former cricketer. He played five first-class matches for South Australia between 1978 and 1982.

== See also ==
- List of South Australian representative cricketers
