= Joanne Bechta Dugan =

American computer engineer (born 1958)

Joanne Bechta Dugan (born 1958) is an American computer engineer whose research concerns fault tolerance in computer systems, fault tree analysis, and the dynamic fault tree method for the probabilistic analysis of fault tolerance. She is a professor of electrical and computer engineering at the University of Virginia.

== Education ==
Dugan studied mathematics and computer science as an undergraduate at La Salle College, graduating in 1980. She went to Duke University for graduate study, and earned a master's degree and PhD in electrical engineering there. Her 1984 dissertation, Extended Stochastic Petri Nets: Applications and Analysis, was jointly supervised by Kishor S. Trivedi and Robert M. Geist III.

== Recognition ==
Dugan was named a Fellow of the IEEE in 2000, "for contributions to dependability analysis of fault tolerant computer systems". In the same year she won the IEEE Reliability Society Award for "contributions of new techniques for fault tree analysis, including theoretical advances, practical application and technology transfer through software tool development". She won the Harriett B. Rigas Award of the IEEE Education Society in 2003 for her contributions to undergraduate education.

In 2016, the La Salle University Computer Science Programs Advisory Board gave Dugan their IT Leadership Award.
