= Maolsheachlainn Ó Dúgáin =

Irish scribe

Maolsheachlainn Ó Dúgáin (fl. mid-19th century) was an Irish scribe.

Ó Dúgáin was a native of Claregalway and related to Tomás Bacach Ó Dúgáin and Liam Ó Dúgáin, all of the same parish. His scribal work consists of songs.
