= 38th Ohio Infantry Regiment =

- Active: September 1, 1861, to July 12, 1865
- Country: United States
- Allegiance: Union
- Branch: Union Army
- Type: Infantry
- Engagements: Battle of Mill Springs; Siege of Corinth; Battle of Perryville; Battle of Stones River; Tullahoma Campaign; Siege of Chattanooga; Battle of Missionary Ridge; Atlanta campaign; Battle of Resaca; Battle of Kennesaw Mountain; Siege of Atlanta; Battle of Jonesboro; Sherman's March to the Sea; Carolinas campaign; Battle of Bentonville

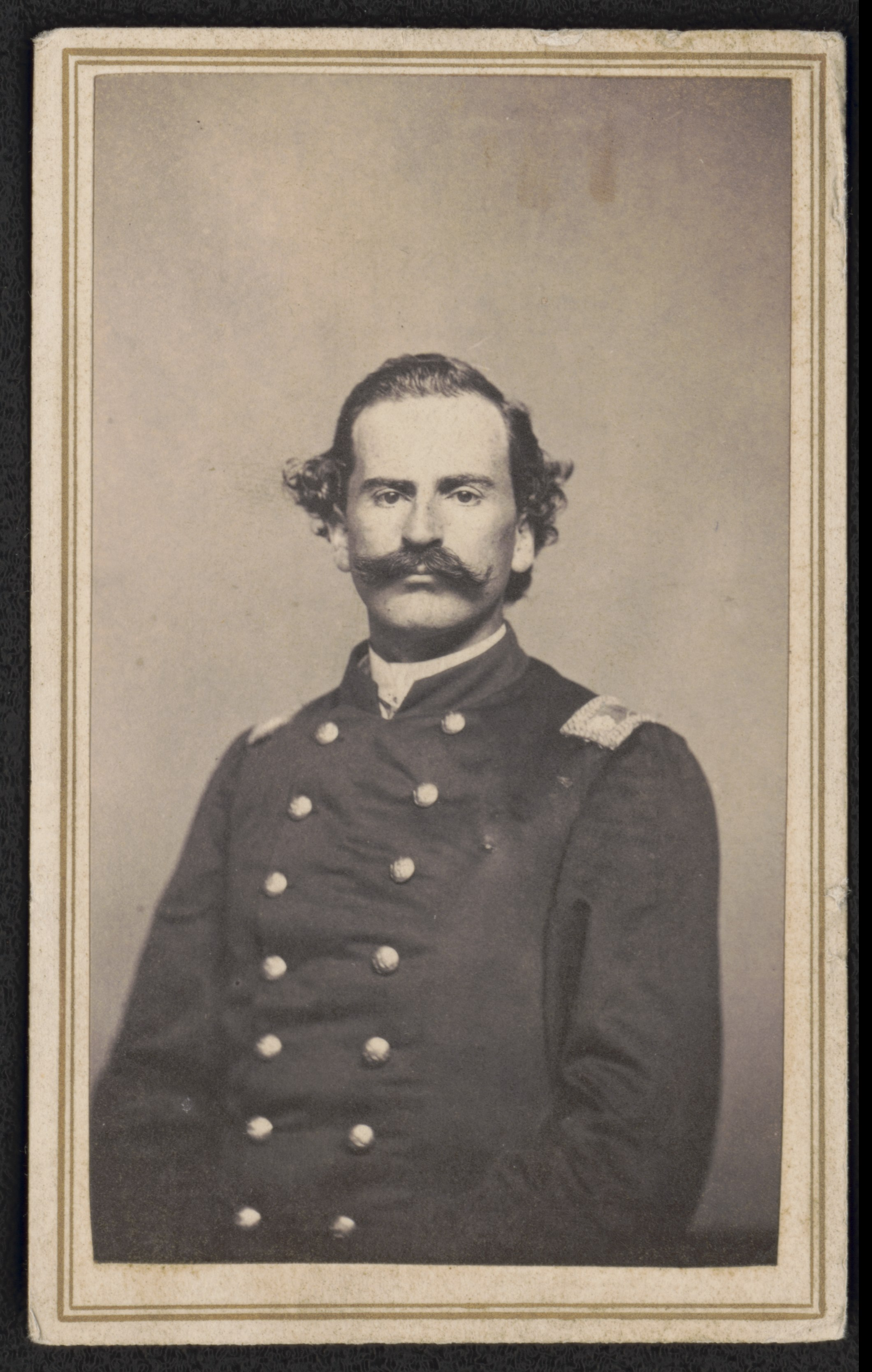
Colonel William Alden Choate of Co. B, 38th Ohio Infantry Regiment. From the Liljenquist Family Collection of Civil War Photographs, Prints and Photographs Division, Library of Congress

The 38th Ohio Infantry Regiment was an infantry regiment in the Union Army during the American Civil War.

== Service ==
The 38th Ohio Infantry Regiment was organized in Defiance, Ohio and mustered in for three years service on September 1, 1861, under the command of Colonel Edwin D. Bradley.

The regiment was attached to 1st Brigade, Army of the Ohio, October–November 1861. 1st Brigade, 1st Division, Army of the Ohio, to September 1862. 1st Brigade, 1st Division, III Corps, Army of the Ohio, to November 1862. 1st Brigade, 3rd Division (Center), XIV Corps, Army of the Cumberland, to January 1863. 1st Brigade, 3rd Division, XIV Corps, to October 1863. 3rd Brigade, 3rd Division, XIV Corps, to July 1865.

The 38th Ohio Infantry mustered out of service at Louisville, Kentucky, on July 12, 1865.

== Detailed service ==
Ordered to Nicholasville, Ky., September 1. At Camp Dick Robinson, Ky., until

Flag carried by Company D

October 19. March to relief of Wild Cat October 19–21. March to Somerset, Ky., and duty there until January 1862. Advance on Camp Hamilton, Ky., January 1–17, 1862. Battle of Mill Springs, Ky., January 19–20. Moved to Louisville, Ky., February 10–16; thence to Nashville, Tenn., via Ohio and Cumberland Rivers February 18-March 2. March to Savannah, Tenn., March 20-April 8. Advance on and siege of Corinth, Miss., April 29-May 30. Pursuit to Booneville June 1–6. March to Iuka, Miss., June 22; thence to Tuscumbia, Ala., June 26. Moved to Huntsville, Ala., July 19–22; thence to Deckard, Tenn., July 27. Decatur, Ala., August 7 (detachment). March to Louisville, Ky., in pursuit of Bragg August 21-September 26. Pursuit of Bragg into Kentucky October 1–15. Battle of Perryville, Ky., October 8. March to Nashville, Tenn., October 16-November 7, and duty there until December 26. Advance on Murfreesboro December 26–30. Battle of Stones River December 30–31, 1862 and January 1–3, 1863. Duty at Murfreesboro until March, and at Triune until June. Expedition toward Columbia March 4–14. Tullahoma Campaign June 23-July 7. Hoover's Gap June 24–26. Occupation of middle Tennessee until August 16. Passage of the Cumberland Mountains and Tennessee River and Chickamauga Campaign August 16-September 22. Conducting trains of the army from the Cumberland to Chattanooga during battle of Chickamauga, and Chattanooga, Tenn., September 25–26. Siege of Chattanooga September 26-November 23. Chattanooga-Ringgold Campaign November 23–27. Orchard Knob November 23–24. Missionary Ridge November 25. Regiment reenlisted December 1863. Atlanta Campaign May 1 to September 8, 1864. Demonstrations on Rocky Faced Ridge May 8–11. Buzzard's Roost Gap May 8–9. Battle of Resaca May 14–15. Advance on Dallas May 18–25. Operations on line of Pumpkin Vine Creek and battles about Dallas, New Hope Church and Allatoona Hills May 25-June 5. Ackworth June 4. Operations about Marietta and against Kennesaw Mountain June 10-July 2. Pine Hill June 11–14. Lost Mountain June 15–17. Assault on Kennesaw June 27. Ruff's Station July 4. Chattahoochie River July 5–17. Peachtree Creek July 19–20. Siege of Atlanta July 22-August 25. Utoy Creek August 5–7. Flank movement on Jonesboro August 25–30. Battle of Jonesboro August 31-September 1. Operations against Hood in northern Georgia and northern Alabama September 29-November 3. March to the sea November 15-December 10. Siege of Savannah December 10–21. Campaign of the Carolinas January to April, 1865. Fayetteville, N. C. Battle of Bentonville March 19–21. Occupation of Goldsboro March 24. Advance on Raleigh April 10–14. Occupation of Raleigh April 14. Bennett's House April 26. Surrender of Johnston and his army. March to Washington, D.C., via Richmond, Va., April 29-May 19. Grand Review of the Armies May 24. Moved to Louisville, Ky., June 12.

== Casualties ==
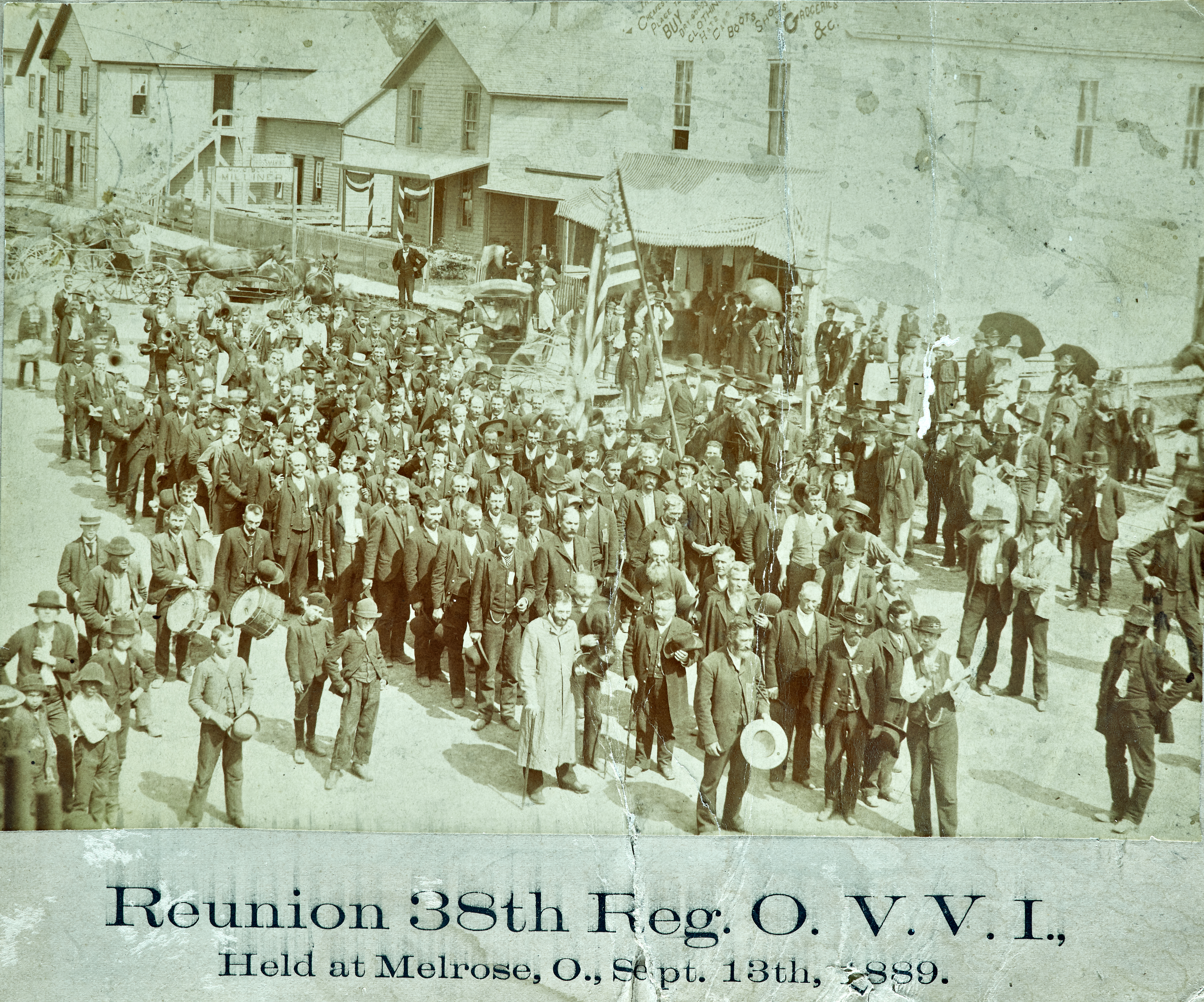

The regiment lost a total of 369 men during service; 8 officers and 132 enlisted men killed or mortally wounded, 2 officers and 227 enlisted men died of disease.

== Commanders ==
- Colonel Edwin D. Bradley - Resigned Feb 6, 1862
- Colonel William A. Choate - commanded at the battle of Perryville as lieutenant colonel; Died Sep 12, 1864 of wounds received in action at the battle of Jonesboro Sep 1, 1864
- Colonel Edward H. Phelps - Killed Nov 25, 1863 in battle for Mission Ridge, Tenn.

== Notable members ==
- Private John Keenan - Medal of Honor recipient, for action in Arizona Territory in 1868

== See also ==
- List of Ohio Civil War units
- Ohio in the Civil War
- Bibliography of the American Civil War
- Bibliography of Ulysses S. Grant
