= Edward H. Phelps =

American lawyer

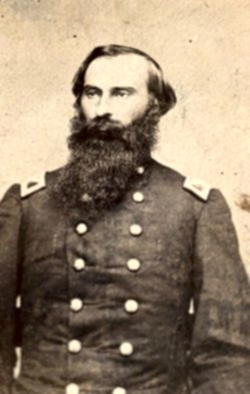
Col. Edward Herrick Phelps

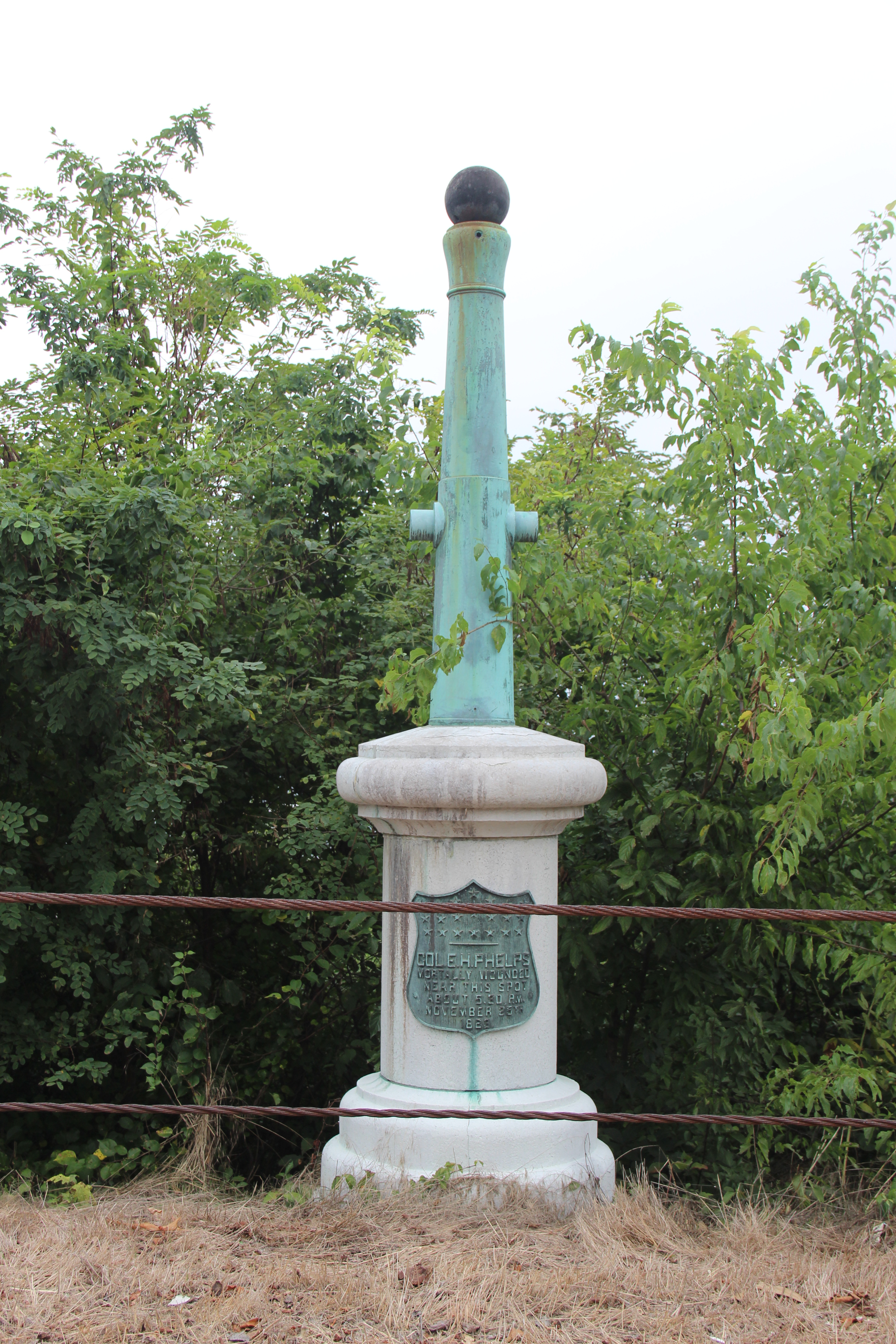
Col. Phelps mortally wounded near this spot, Missionary Ridge, Chattanooga

Edward Herrick Phelps (c. 1829 – November 25, 1863) was a Lieutenant-Colonel who served under General Ulysses S. Grant in the Union Army during the American Civil War. He served in the battle of Missionary Ridge at Chattanooga, Tennessee, and while already wounded, was shot and killed while still leading his men into the battle. Considered a hero for his sacrifice, a tribute was later given to Phelps by a fellow office in an Ohio newspaper, while the men under his command paid for his monument.

== Early life ==
Records of Phelps' early life are sketchy, and accounts vary about his place of birth. Various sources yield different birthplaces, i.e. Maine, Massachusetts, and New York. To date the names of his parents and any siblings he may have had have not been determined for lack of records.

On February 14, 1855, Phelps married Harriett D. Welles. Phelps studied law, came to Ohio, and by 1860 had established a practice in the city of Defiance, Ohio.

== Civil War ==
The 38th Ohio Volunteer Infantry Regiment was formed in 1861 in response to President Lincoln's call for 75,000 volunteers. As an attorney, Phelps held a position of leadership in his hometown, which extended into his military service. Subsequently, on June 10, 1861, he was commissioned Lieutenant Colonel of the 38th Ohio Infantry.

Phelps' regiment was first assigned to Fort Dennison in Cincinnati, where they were trained, armed and equipped. Thereafter Phelps and his regiment was sent to Kentucky where they received further training at Camp Dick Robinson near Louisville. During the next few months, the 38th Ohio took part in relieving the garrison at Camp Wild Cat, in south-central Kentucky, and encamped at nearby Somerset, where they remained through January 1862.

After the Union defeat at the Battle of Chickamauga, General Grant arrived there and assumed overall command. When Colonel John Croxton was wounded during the battle he was unable to maintain command over the 3rd Brigade and command was subsequently given to Colonel Phelps who was the regimental commander over the 38th Ohio Infantry, which was assigned to the 1st Division after Chickamauga. The Army of the Cumberland was re-organized and the regiments were assigned to various positions. Because of Phelps’ good service he was assigned command over the 3d Brigade, 3d Division of the 14th Army Corps, which included Phelps’ own 38th and the 14th Ohio Infantry. This promotion to brigade command did not, however, include a promotion in rank, and Phelps remained a colonel. On November 25, 1863, during the taking of Missionary Ridge at Chattanooga, Tennessee, while Phelps and his men were ascending the slope, he was shot and wounded but continued on leading his men. Phelps was then shot a second time and killed as he neared the summit; he was the only Union officer of brigade-command or higher to lose his life during the battle.

After the battle, Captain Seth B. Moe wrote a tribute, dated November 27, from Chattanooga, to Colonel Phelps which appeared in the Toledo Blade, December 5, 1863.

"Col. E. H. Phelps, of the 38th Ohio, was killed. He was a gallant man. He was first wounded while leading his men up the hill, but not mortally. Not willing to be left behind the charging forces, supported by some of his soldiers, he continued to lead his Brigade to the top of the hill, where, while cheering his men on to victory, he was again hit and died almost instantly. He had been in command of the 3d Brigade, 3d Division, 14th Army Corps, since the re-organization of the Army in October, and had made himself its loved and popular commander. The army has lost in him a good officer, and the country a devoted and patriotic defender."

— Seth B. Moe, November 27, 1863

Phelps' funeral was attended by the 1st Regiment who escorted his remains to Forest Cemetery, where he received the proper military honors. After Phelps' death, in December 1863, with the war still not over, members of the 38th Ohio deemed something more was needed in tribute to Phelps' memory. They managed to raise $800 out of their own money, paid for and erected a monument in his honor. The 38th publicly resolved: “that we, the members of his regiment, cause to be erected sacred to his memory, a monument." The monument is at Phelps' gravesite in Forest Cemetery in Toledo, Ohio.

== See also ==
- Bibliography of Ulysses S. Grant
- Bibliography of the American Civil War
- List of Ohio Civil War units
- Ohio in the Civil War
- List of American Civil War battles

== Bibliography ==
- Belcher, Dennis W. (2009). The 10th Kentucky Volunteer Infantry in the Civil War: A History and Roster. McFarland. ISBN 9780786453993.
- Cozzens, Peter (1996). The Shipwreck of Their Hopes: THE BATTLES FOR CHATTANOOGA. University of Illinois Press. ISBN 978-0-2520-6595-8.
- "Edward Herrick Phelps (1829–1863)". Greater Toledo Civil War Roundtable. 2014.
- Louis-Philippe-Albert d'Orléans comte de Paris (1888). History of the Civil War in America, Volume 4. Porter & Coates. Other volumes
- Strayer, Larry M.; Baumgartner, Richard A. (1996). Echoes of battle: the struggle for Chattanooga. Blue Acorn Press. ISBN 978-1-8850-3316-1.
- Sword, Wiley (1995). Mountains Touched with Fire: Chattanooga Besieged, 1863. Macmillan. ISBN 978-0-3121-5593-3.
