= John Keenan (Medal of Honor) =

United States Army Medal of Honor recipient (1840s–1906

- Born: 1840s Ireland
- Died: March 18, 1906
- Military career
- Allegiance: United States of America
- Branch: United States Army
- Rank: Private
- Units: 38th Ohio Infantry; 8th Cavalry Regiment
- Conflicts: American Civil War; Indian Wars
- Awards: Medal of Honor

John Keenan (1840s – March 18, 1906) was a United States Army soldier and a recipient of the United States military's highest decoration, the Medal of Honor, for his actions in the Indian Wars of the western United States involving "bravery in scouts and actions against Indians.

== Biography ==
Keenan was born in Ireland, probably in the 1840s, and immigrated to the United States. During the American Civil War, he served with the 38th Ohio Infantry. He then traveled to San Francisco, California, and re-enlisted in the Army in 1866.

By August 1868, Keenan was serving as a private in Company B of the 8th Cavalry Regiment. Over the next two months, his company was constantly engaged in fights against the Hualapai in northwestern Arizona Territory. For his actions during these engagements, Keenan was awarded the Medal of Honor the next year, on July 24, 1869.

Keenan continued to fight in the Indian Wars until 1871. Afterward, he was sent to Fort Stanton, New Mexico, to recover from a wound received in battle. While there, he worked as a groundskeeper and carried out various chores around the fort. During one of these chores, a burning ember hit him in the eyes, leaving him nearly blind. He left the military and lived in Minnesota and Iowa. His exact burial place is uncertain, but is believed to be in or near McIntire, Iowa.

== Medal of Honor citation ==
Rank and organization: Private, Company B, 8th U.S. Cavalry. Place and date: Arizona, August to October 1868. Entered service at:------. Birth: Ireland. Date of issue: 24 July 1869.

Citation:

Bravery in scouts and actions against Indians.

== See also ==
- List of Medal of Honor recipients for the Indian Wars
