= Battle of Missionary Ridge =

Battle of the American Civil War, 1863

- Part of the American Civil War
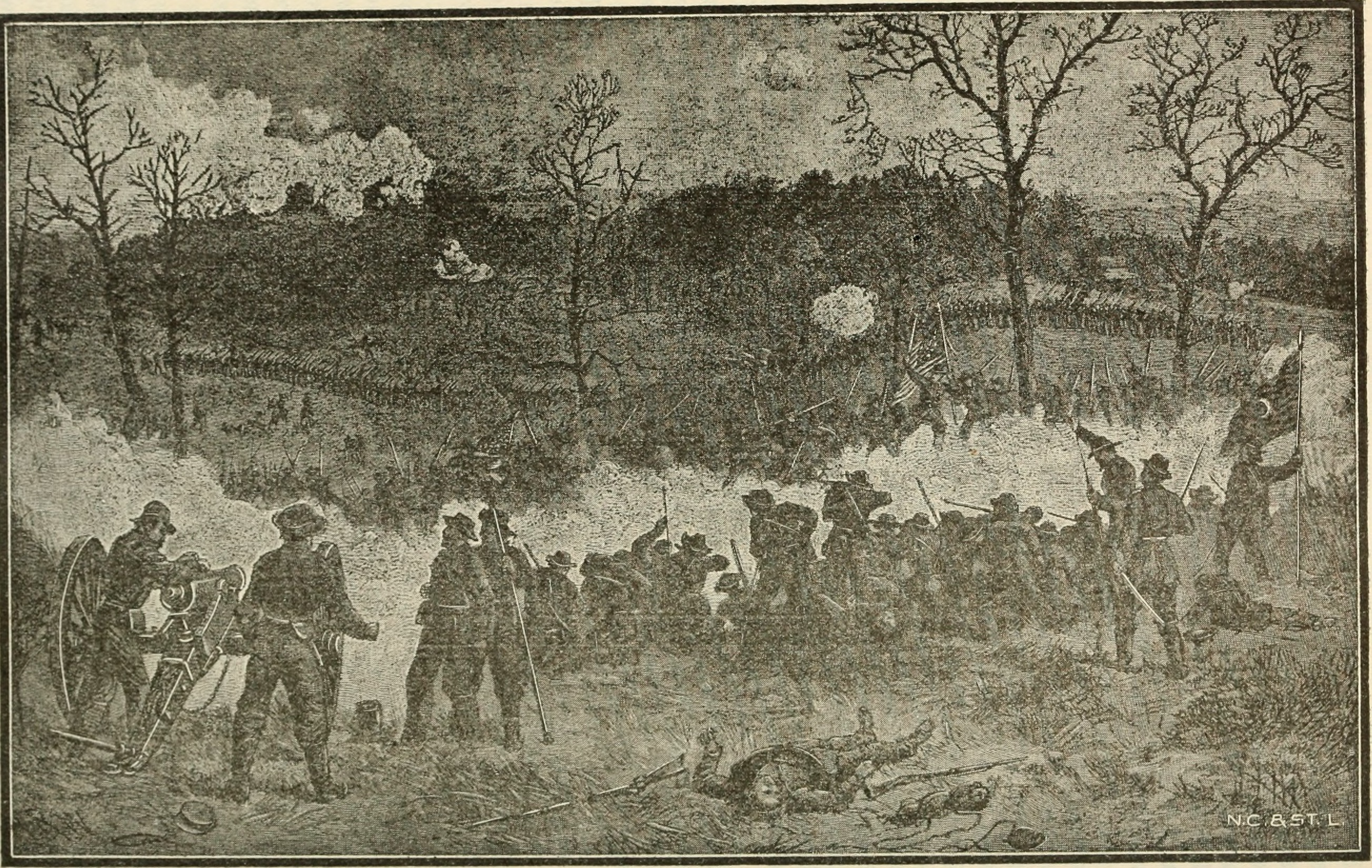
- 1906 illustration of the Army of Tennessee at the battle
Date	November 25, 1863
Location	Chattanooga, Tennessee 35.030°N 85.257°W
Result	Union victory

Belligerents
United States (Union)	(Confederate States of America) Confederate States

Commanders and leaders
Ulysses S. Grant; George Henry Thomas; William Tecumseh Sherman	Braxton Bragg; John C. Breckinridge; William J. Hardee

Units involved
Military Division of the Mississippi: Army of the Cumberland; Army of the Tennessee	Army of Tennessee

Strength
56,359	44,010

Casualties and losses
5,824 total (753 killed 4,722 wounded 349 captured/missing)	6,667 total (361 killed 2,160 wounded 4,146 men captured/missing, 40 cannons also captured)

The Battle of Missionary Ridge, also known as the Battle of Chattanooga, was fought on November 25, 1863, as part of the Chattanooga campaign of the American Civil War. Following the Union victory in the Battle of Lookout Mountain on November 24, Union forces in the Military Division of the Mississippi under Maj. Gen. Ulysses S. Grant assaulted Missionary Ridge and defeated the Confederate Army of Tennessee, commanded by Gen. Braxton Bragg, forcing it to retreat to Georgia.

In the morning, Maj. Gen. William Tecumseh Sherman, commanding the Union Army of the Tennessee, made piecemeal attacks to capture the northern end of Missionary Ridge, Tunnel Hill, but were stopped by fierce resistance from the Confederate divisions of Maj. Gen. Patrick Cleburne, William H.T. Walker, and Carter L. Stevenson. In the afternoon, Grant was concerned that Bragg was reinforcing his right flank at Sherman's expense. He ordered the Army of the Cumberland, commanded by Maj. Gen. George Henry Thomas, to move forward and seize the Confederate line of rifle pits on the valley floor and stop there, as a demonstration to assist Sherman's efforts. The Union soldiers moved forward and quickly pushed the Confederates from the first line of rifle pits, but were then subjected to a punishing fire from the Confederate lines up the ridge.

After a short pause to regain their breath, the Union soldiers continued the attack against the remaining lines further up the ridge, found that the defenders' remaining rifle pits were untenable and pursued the fleeing Confederates. This second advance was taken up by the commanders on the spot and also by some of the soldiers. Seeing what was happening, Thomas and his subordinates sent orders confirming orders for the ascent. The Union advance was somewhat disorganized but effective, finally overwhelming and scattering what ought to have been, as General Grant himself believed, an impregnable Confederate line. The top line of Confederate rifle pits was sited on the actual crest rather than the military crest of the ridge, leaving blind spots for infantry and artillery. In combination with an advance from the southern end of the ridge by divisions under Maj. Gen. Joseph Hooker, the Union Army routed Bragg's army, which retreated to Dalton, Georgia, ending the siege of Union forces in Chattanooga, Tennessee.

== Background ==
=== Military situation ===
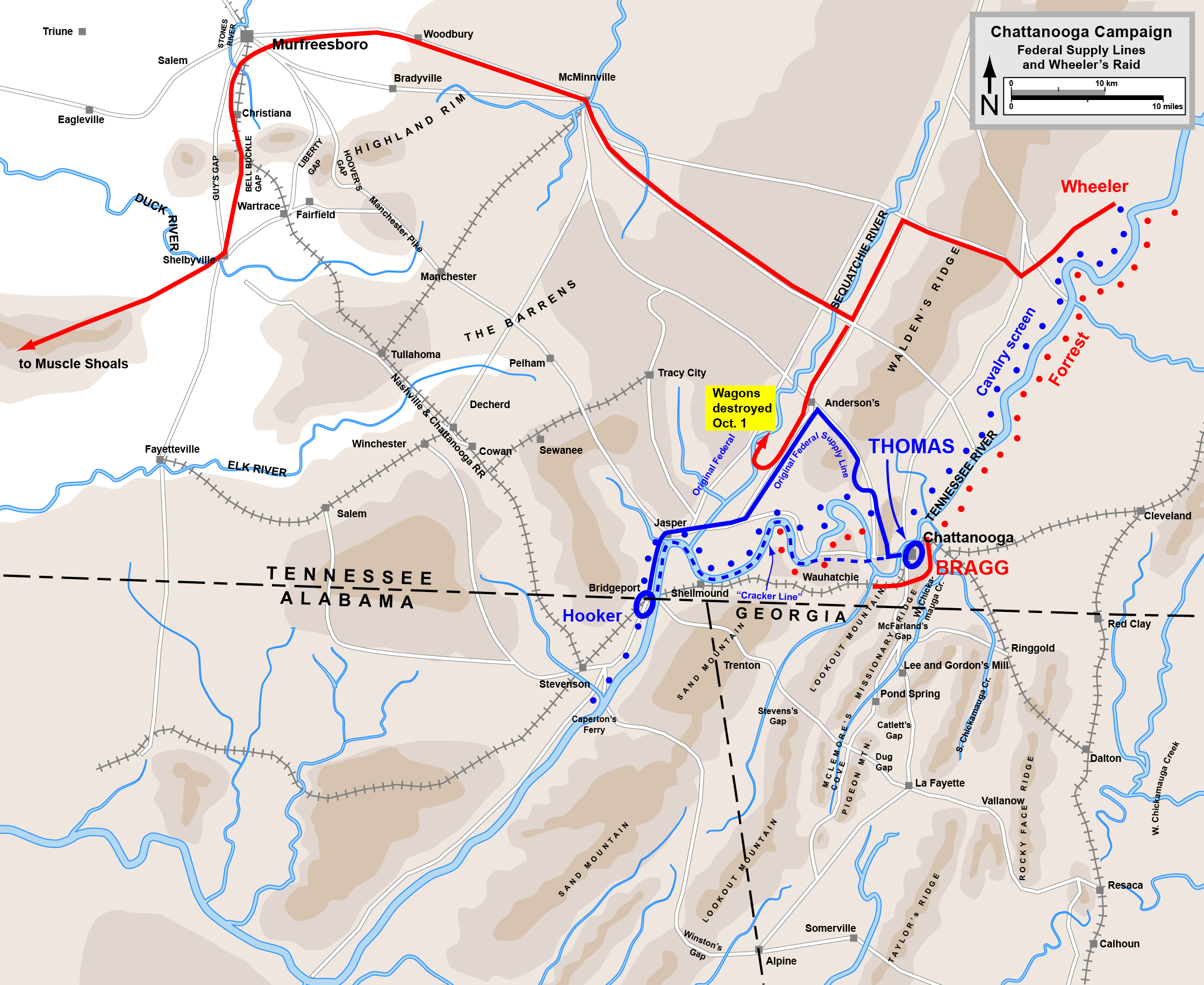
Federal supply lines and Wheeler's October 1863 raid Confederate Union

After their disastrous defeat at the Battle of Chickamauga, the 40,000 men of the Union Army of the Cumberland under Maj. Gen. William Rosecrans retreated to Chattanooga. Confederate General Braxton Bragg's Army of Tennessee besieged the city, threatening to starve the Union forces into surrender. Bragg's troops established themselves on Missionary Ridge and Lookout Mountain, both of which had excellent views of the city, the Tennessee River flowing north of the city, and the Union supply lines.

Heavy rains began to fall in late September, washing away long stretches of the mountain roads. On October 1, Maj. Gen. Joseph Wheeler's Confederate cavalry intercepted and severely damaged a train of 800 wagons—burning hundreds of the wagons, and shooting or sabering hundreds of mules—at the start of his October 1863 raid through Tennessee to sever Rosecrans's supply line. Toward the end of October, typical Federal soldiers' rations were "four cakes of hard bread and a quarter pound of pork" every three days.

The Union Army sent reinforcements: Maj. Gen. Joseph Hooker with 15,000 men in two corps from the Army of the Potomac in Virginia and Maj. Gen. William Tecumseh Sherman with 20,000 men from Vicksburg, Mississippi. On October 17, Maj. Gen. Ulysses S. Grant received command of three Western armies, designated the Military Division of the Mississippi; he moved to reinforce Chattanooga and replaced Rosecrans with Maj. Gen. George Henry Thomas.

Thomas launched a surprise amphibious landing at Brown's Ferry on October 27 that opened the Tennessee River by linking up his Army of the Cumberland with Hooker's relief column southwest of the city, thus allowing supplies and reinforcements to flow into Chattanooga over what was called the "Cracker Line". In response, Bragg ordered Lt. Gen. James Longstreet to force the Federals out of Lookout Valley. The ensuing Battle of Wauhatchie (October 28–29) was one of the war's few battles fought exclusively at night.

Sherman arrived with his 20,000 men of the Army of the Tennessee in mid-November. Grant, Sherman, and Thomas planned a flanking attack on Bragg's force, with an assault by Sherman against the northern end of Missionary Ridge, supplemented by two of Thomas' divisions from the center. Hooker, instead of attempting to capture Lookout Mountain and then move across the Chattanooga Valley to the break in the ridge at Rossville, Georgia, was to do nothing besides forwarding troops toward the center.

Running behind schedule, Sherman's force was ready to cross the Tennessee River early on November 24. The day before, Grant ordered Thomas to advance halfway to Missionary Ridge on a reconnaissance in force to determine the strength of the Confederate line, hoping to ensure that Bragg would not withdraw his forces and move in the direction of Knoxville, Tennessee, where Maj. Gen. Ambrose Burnside was being threatened by a Confederate force under Lt. Gen. James Longstreet. Thomas sent over 14,000 men toward a minor hill named Orchard Knob, and overran the Confederate defenders. Grant changed his orders and instructed Thomas's men to dig in and hold the position.

Surprised by Thomas's move and realizing that his center and right might be more vulnerable than he had thought, Bragg quickly readjusted his strategy. Bragg assigned Col. Warren Grigsby's brigade of Kentucky cavalry to picket the Tennessee River northeast of Chattanooga and ordered Brig. Gen. Marcus Joseph Wright to bring his brigade of Tennessee infantry from Cleveland, Tennessee, by train to Chickamauga Station. He recalled all units he had recently ordered to Knoxville if they were within a day's march. Maj. Gen. Patrick Cleburne's division returned after dark from Chickamauga Station, interrupting the process of boarding the trains. Bragg began to reduce the strength on his left by withdrawing Maj. Gen. William H. T. Walker's division from the base of Lookout Mountain and placing them on the far right of Missionary Ridge, just south of Tunnel Hill. He assigned Lt. Gen. William J. Hardee to command his now critical right flank, turning over the left flank to Maj. Gen. Carter L. Stevenson. Bragg's concern for his right proved justified and his decisions were fortuitous. In the center, Maj. Gen. John C. Breckinridge ordered his men to begin fortifying the crest of Missionary Ridge, a task that Bragg had somehow neglected for weeks. Unable to decide whether to defend the base or the crest of the ridge, the divisions of Brig. Gens. William B. Bate and J. Patton Anderson were ordered to move half of their divisions to the crest, leaving the remainder in the rifle pits along the base. James L. McDonough wrote of the upper entrenchments, "Placed along the physical crest rather than what is termed the military crest ... these works severely handicapped the defenders."

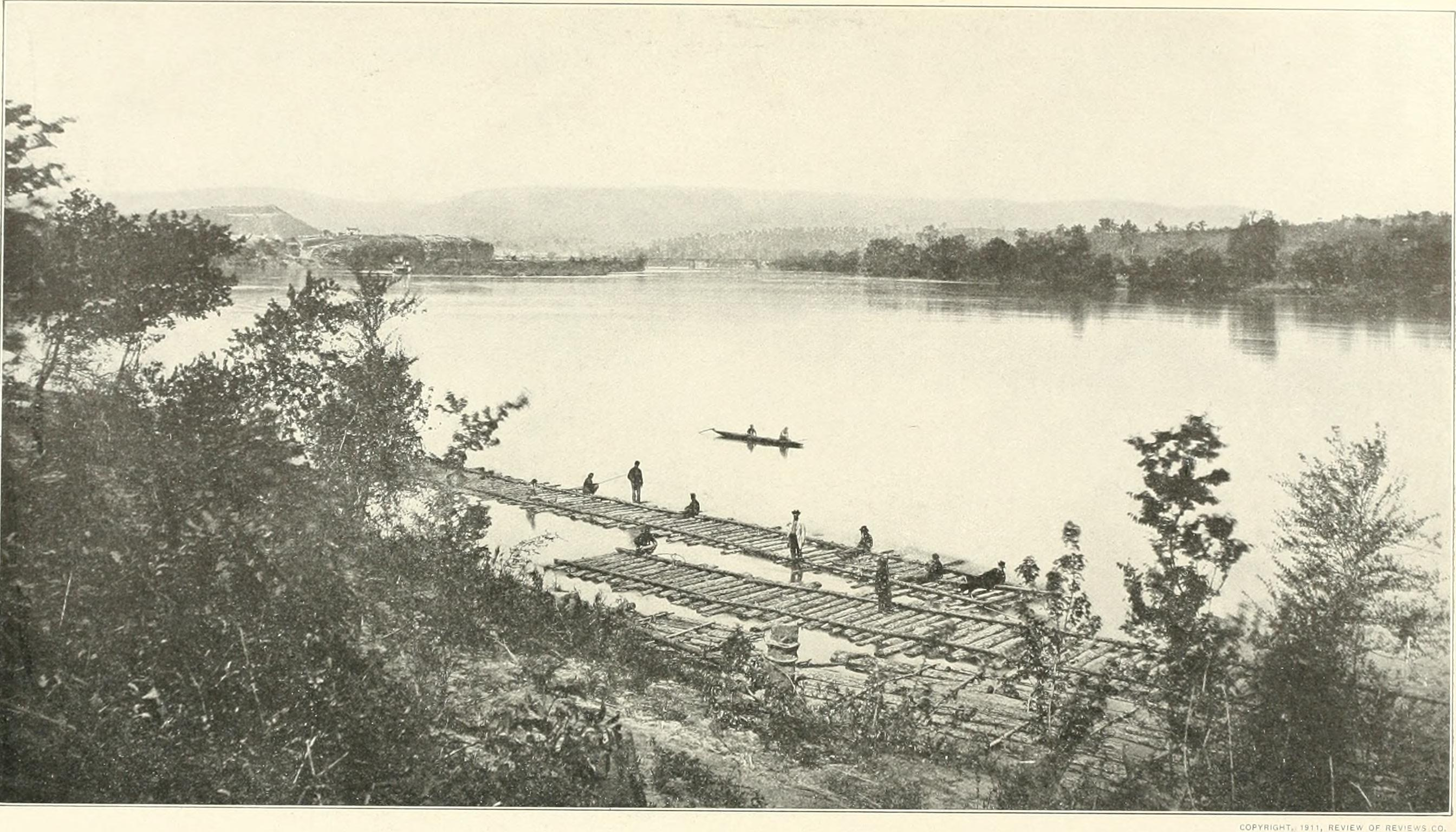
Place where Gen. Sherman's force crossed the Tennessee

November 24 was dark, with low clouds, fog, and drizzling rain. Sherman's force crossed the Tennessee River successfully in the morning, then took the set of hills at the north end of Missionary Ridge, although he was surprised to find that a valley separated him from the main part of the ridge. Alerted by Grigsby's cavalry that the enemy had crossed the river in force, Bragg sent Cleburne's division and Wright's brigade to challenge Sherman. After skirmishing with the Confederates, Sherman ordered his men to dig in on the hills he had seized. Cleburne, likewise, dug in around Tunnel Hill.

At the same time, Hooker's command succeeded in the Battle of Lookout Mountain and prepared to move east toward Bragg's left flank on Missionary Ridge. The divisions of Stevenson and Cheatham retreated behind Chattanooga Creek, burning the bridges behind them.

On the night of November 24, Bragg asked his two corps commanders whether to retreat or to stand and fight. Cleburne, concerned about what Sherman had accomplished, expected Bragg to retreat. Hardee also counseled retreat, but Breckinridge convinced Bragg to fight it out on the strong position of Missionary Ridge. Accordingly, the troops withdrawn from Lookout Mountain were ordered to the right wing to assist in repelling Sherman.

== Opposing forces ==
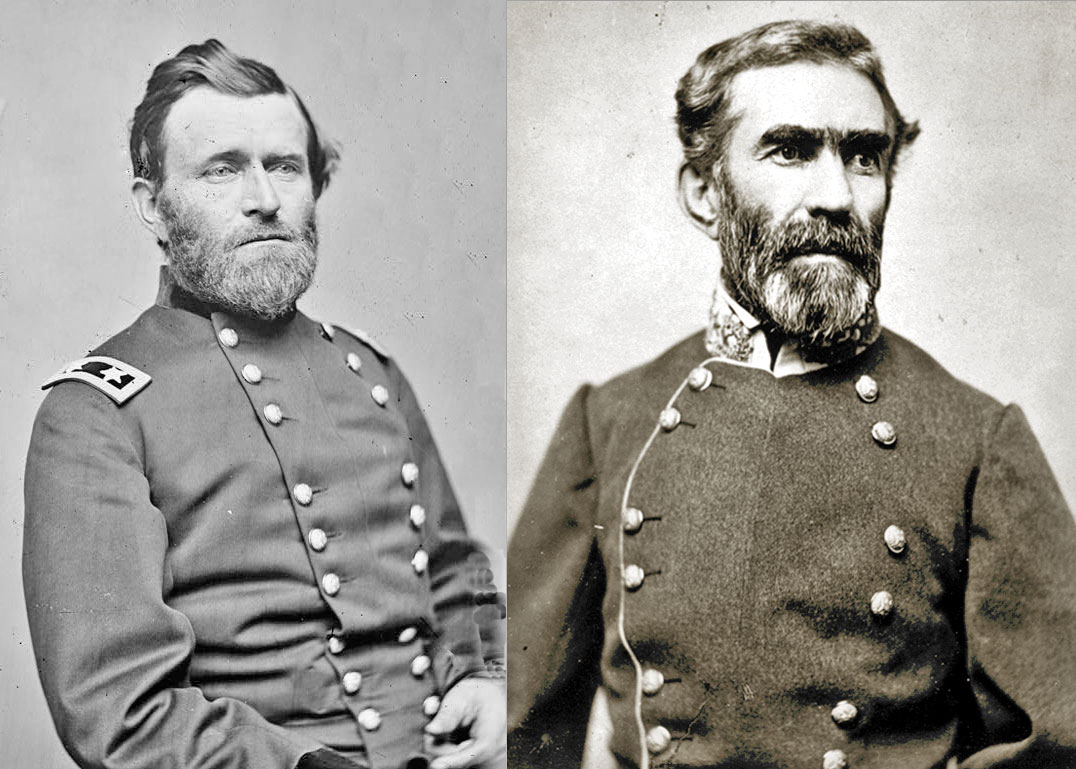
Opposing commanders: Maj. Gen. Ulysses S. Grant, USA and Gen. Braxton Bragg, CSA

=== Union ===
Key commanders (Military Division of the Mississippi)
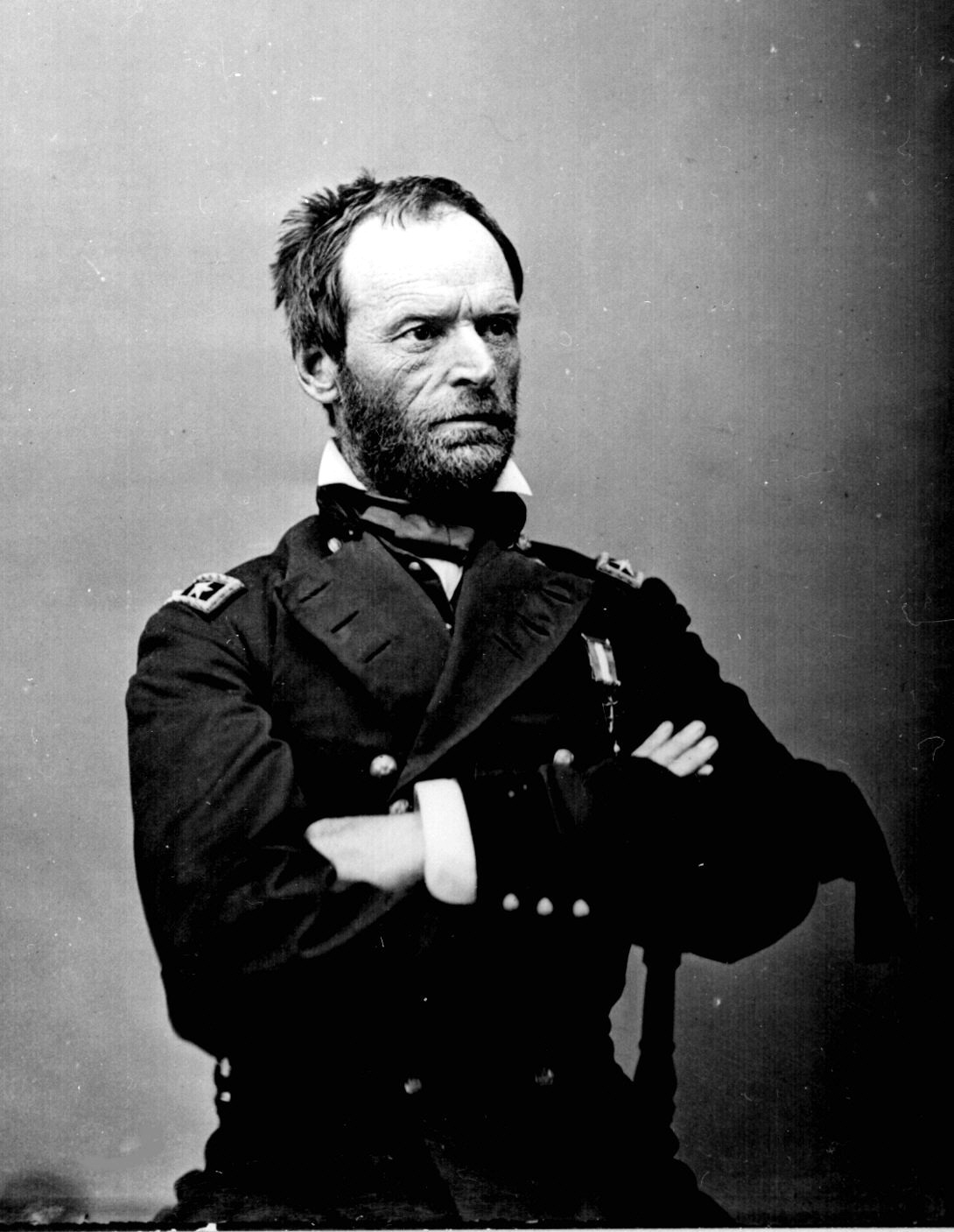
Maj. Gen.
William T. Sherman,
Army of the Tennessee

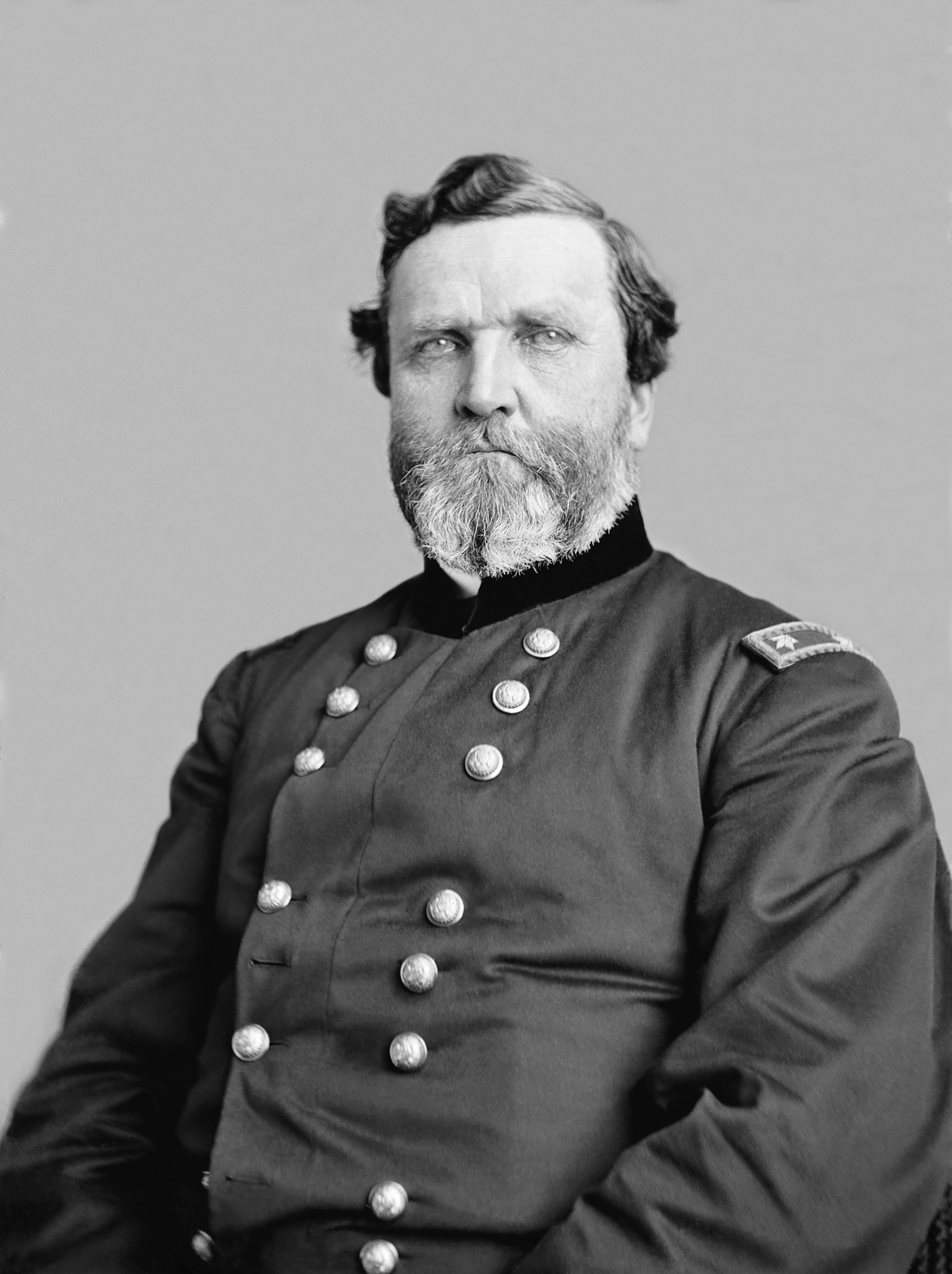
Maj. Gen.
George H. Thomas,
Army of the Cumberland

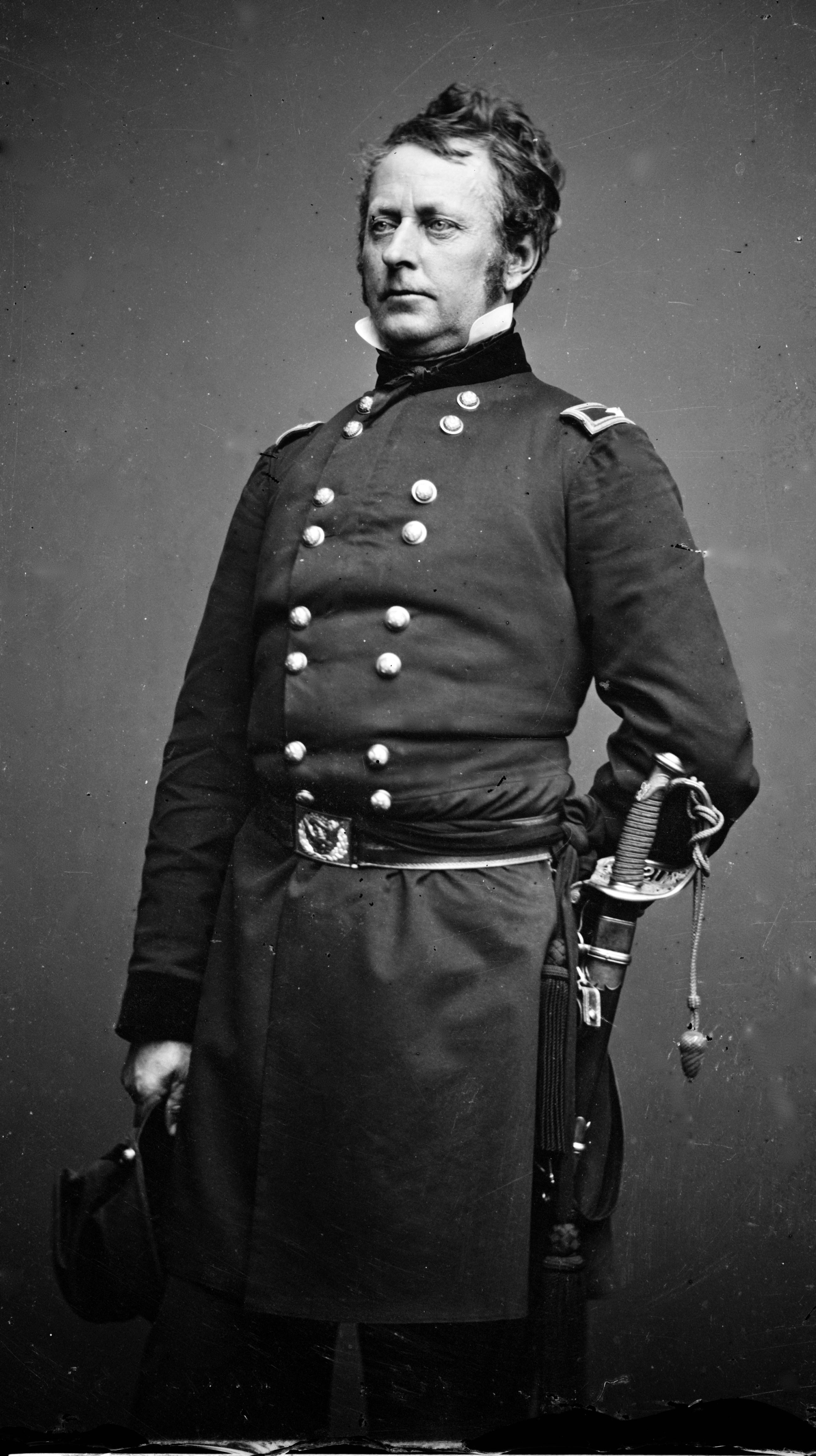
Maj. Gen.
Joseph Hooker,
Detachment from Army of the Potomac

Grant's Military Division of the Mississippi assembled the following forces at Chattanooga:

- The Army of the Tennessee, commanded by Maj. Gen. William T. Sherman, consisting of the XV Corps under Maj. Gen. Francis Preston Blair Jr., and the 2nd Division of the XVII Corps under Brig. Gen. John E. Smith.
- The Army of the Cumberland, commanded by Maj. Gen. George Henry Thomas, consisting of the IV Corps under Maj. Gen. Gordon Granger, and the XIV Corps under Maj. Gen. John M. Palmer.
- The command of Maj. Gen. Joseph Hooker, which had become part of the Army of the Cumberland by this point, consisting of the XI Corps under Maj. Gen. Oliver Otis Howard and the 2nd Division of the XII Corps under Brig. Gen. John W. Geary. (Starting with the Battle of Lookout Mountain, Hooker effectually commanded Geary's division of the XII Corps and a division each detached from the IV and XV Corps.)

=== Confederate ===
Key commanders (Army of Tennessee)
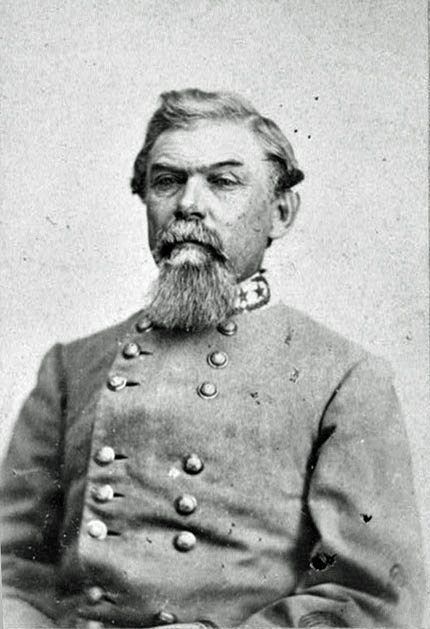
Lt. Gen.
William J. Hardee,
Hardee's Corps

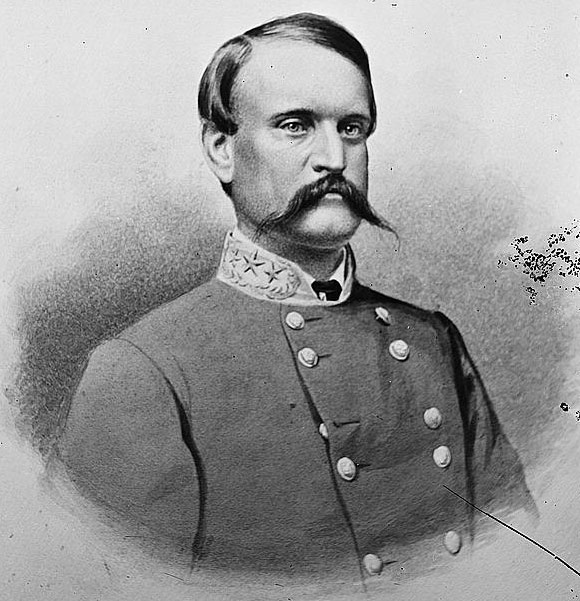
Maj. Gen.
John C. Breckinridge,
Breckinridge's Corps

Bragg's Army of Tennessee had the following forces available in Chattanooga:

- Hardee's Corps, under Lt. Gen. William J. Hardee, consisting of the divisions under Brig. Gen. John K. Jackson (Cheatham's Division), Brig. Gen. James Patton Anderson (Hindman's Division), Brig. Gen. States Rights Gist (Walker's Division), and Maj. Gen. Simon Bolivar Buckner (detached November 22 to Knoxville).
- Breckinridge's Corps, commanded by Maj. Gen. John C. Breckinridge, consisting of the divisions of Maj. Gens. Patrick Cleburne, Alexander P. Stewart, Carter L. Stevenson, and Brig. Gen. William B. Bate (Breckinridge's Division). During the battle, Cleburne's division operated under Hardee's control.

On November 5, Bragg had seriously weakened his forces by sending Longstreet's Corps, commanded by Lt. Gen. James Longstreet, with the divisions of Maj. Gen. Lafayette McLaws and Brig. Gen. Micah Jenkins (Hood's Division), against Maj. Gen. Ambrose Burnside near Knoxville. On November 22, Bragg had further weakened his forces by ordering Buckner's division to reinforce Longstreet at Knoxville.

== Battle ==
Battles of Chattanooga, November 24–25, 1863

Sherman should have put in all his force to turn Bragg's right, instead of attacking the strongest place on the right, for Bragg had given to the right every man that he could safely spare.

— Brig. Gen. William F. "Baldy" Smith

On November 25, Grant's plan concentrated on the attack by Sherman against Bragg's right flank at Tunnel Hill. He gave a supporting role to Thomas:

I have instructed Sherman to advance as soon as it is light in the morning, and your attack, which will be simultaneous, will be in cooperation. Your command will either carry the rifle pits and ridge directly in front of them or move to the left, as the presence of the enemy may require.

Grant had no particular expectation for Hooker other than to divert Bragg's attention by continued demonstrations on Lookout Mountain, which had been evacuated by the Confederates. However, Thomas wanted support on his flank and called Hooker to cross the valley and demonstrate against Bragg's left flank directly at the Rossville Gap.

=== Sherman at Tunnel Hill ===
In a letter to his brother, Sherman wrote:

The whole philosophy of the battle was that I should get, by a dash, a position on the extremity of the Missionary Ridge from which the enemy would be forced to drive me, or allow his depot at Chickamauga Station to be in danger. I expected Bragg to attack me at daylight, but he did not, and to bring matters to a crisis quickly, for the sake of Burnside in East Tennessee, Grant ordered me to assume the offensive.

Sherman had about 16,600 men in the three divisions of Brig. Gens. Morgan Lewis Smith, John E. Smith, and his foster brother and brother-in-law Hugh Boyle Ewing, and three regiments of Col. Adolphus Buschbeck's brigade from the XI Corps. Sherman also had Jefferson C. Davis's division guarding his rear. Around ten o'clock that morning, Grant dispatched the rest of Howard's XI corps from Thomas to Sherman. Hardee had about 9,000 Confederates in the divisions of Cleburne and Walker with another 4,000 soon to arrive in Stevenson's division. On Hardee's left, Benjamin F. Cheatham's decimated division occupied the ridge between Thomas' and Sherman's fronts. However, at dawn, when Sherman was supposed to attack, he was opposed by just three small brigades under Cleburne—about 4,000 men—and only the Texas brigade of Brig. Gen. James A. Smith was actually positioned on Tunnel Hill. But seemingly unnerved by his incorrect positioning, Sherman delayed until about 9:00 o'clock. He selected just two brigades from Ewing's division to attack. Brig. Gen. John M. Corse would approach from the north, Col. John M. Loomis from the northwest, across the open fields between the railroads.

Sherman ordered Corse's brigade, with a detachment from Joseph A.J. Lightburn's brigade, to attack along the narrow length of Tunnel Hill. Col. John M. Loomis's brigade, supported by Buschbeck, would move across the open fields on the west of the ridge while Brig. Gen. Giles Alexander Smith's brigade would move through the valley on the east side of the ridge. The brigades of Brig. Gen. Charles L. Matthies and Col. Green Berry Raum were held in reserve to follow up any successful attack; the brigades of Cols. Joseph R. Cockerill and Jesse I. Alexander would hold the heights seized the day before.

Corse drove off the Confederate skirmish line and seized some half-built defensive works at the north end of Tunnel Hill. Continuing over the crest of the hill, Corse charged Cleburne's main position but was repulsed. After several attempts, Sherman gave up on attacking from Corse's position and the fighting shifted to the west side of the ridge. Loomis had advanced to the railroad in front of the ridge where he skirmished with Walker's division. Buschbeck, followed by Matthies and then Raum were sent up the west slope of Tunnel Hill between Loomis and Corse. Cleburne's salient began to feel the pressure and it came close to breaking. Hardee fed in reinforcements from Stevenson's division, and Cleburne ordered a general counterattack. Charging down the hill at 4 p.m., the Confederates routed Sherman's men, who were too tired and low on ammunition to resist, and captured numerous Federal prisoners.

Sherman's attack came to a halt, a tactical failure in which he lost almost 2,000 casualties but committed only a fraction of his available force in a direct assault on a strong position, rather than attempting to outflank Bragg. Military historian David Eicher called this Sherman's "worst experience as a commander, first miscalculating the terrain and then stumbling through a prolonged, unsuccessful, and needless attack." On the other hand, Steven E. Woodworth judged that "Cleburne was in fine form today, deftly shifting troops around his hilltop position and skillfully judging when and where to launch limited counterattacks—often leading them himself."

An alternative view has been expressed by B. H. Liddell Hart, who contends that Sherman did not commit his entire force because he was expecting Bragg to attack him to dislodge the Union force from a threatening position. He "gave the Confederates several hours in which to attack them and when he saw that they showed no signs of accepting the invitation, he made it more pressing by launching three brigades against their position. But his real desire is unmistakably established by the fact that he kept three brigades to hold his own ridge, with five more in reserve behind."

=== Thomas's assault on the Confederate center ===
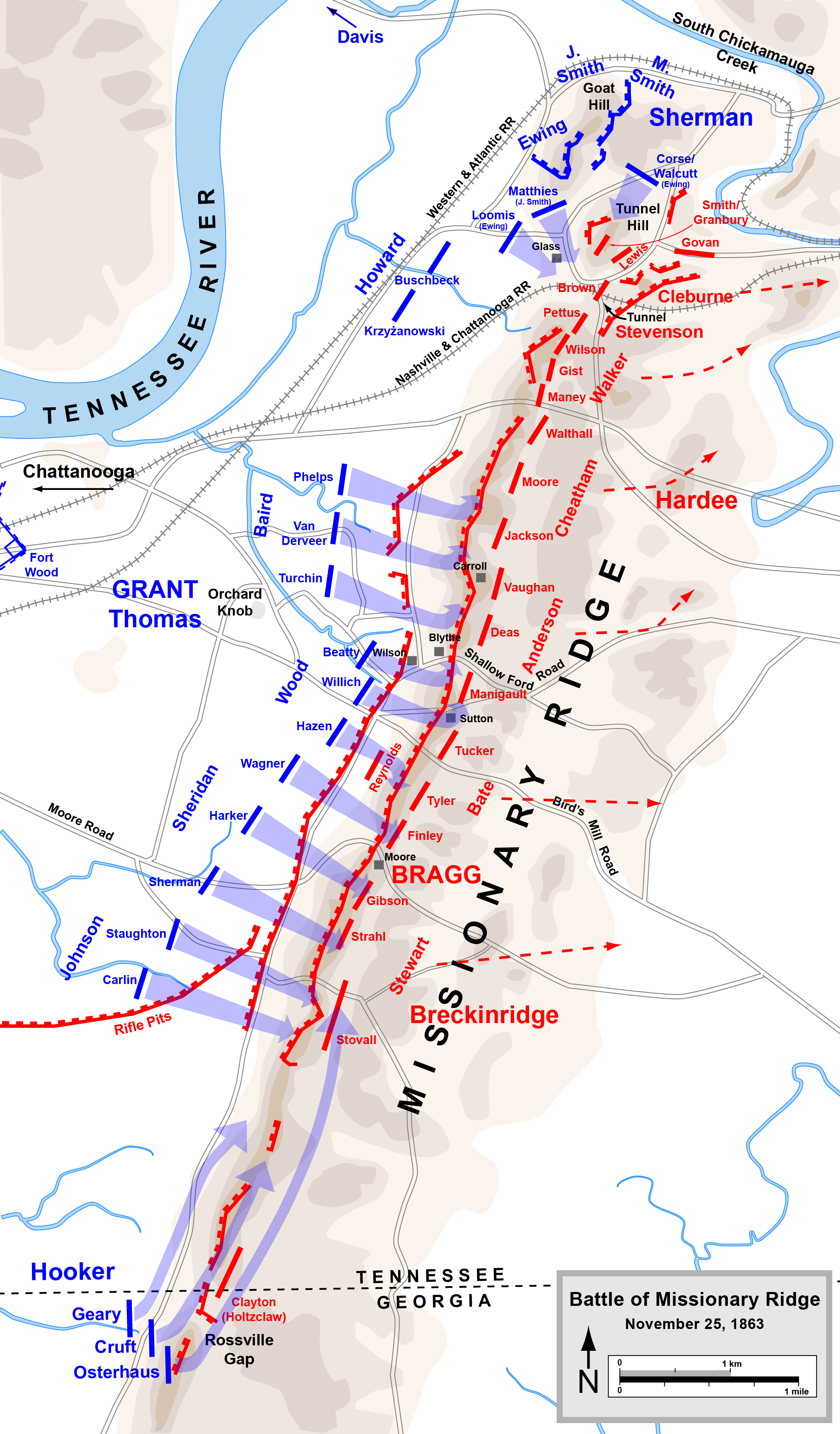
Battle of Missionary Ridge, November 25, 1863 Confederate Union

At around 2:30 pm, Grant spoke with Brig. Gen. Thomas J. Wood, his classmate from West Point. "General Sherman seems to be having a hard time," Grant observed. "It seems as if we ought to go help him." He decided to send Wood's and Maj. Gen. Philip Sheridan's divisions against the Confederate rifle pits at the base of the ridge, hoping to concern Bragg and relieve the pressure on Sherman. Grant suggested his idea to Thomas, but personal relations between the two generals were chilly during the campaign and Thomas rebuffed Grant's idea—he had no intention of attacking until he was assured that Hooker was successfully attacking the enemy's flank. Meanwhile, IV Corps commander Maj. Gen. Gordon Granger was nearby, completely absorbed in the activities of a battery of artillery.

Irritated, Grant asked Thomas to order Granger to "take command of his own corps. And now order your troops to advance and take the enemy's first line of rifle pits." At 3:00 pm, Thomas passed the order to Granger, but incredibly, Granger ignored the order and resumed commanding the battery of artillery. After a further scolding from Grant, Granger finally issued orders to Wood and Sheridan. Messengers also went to Brig. Gens. Absalom Baird and Richard W. Johnson of Maj. Gen. John M. Palmer's XIV Corps, ordering them to move upon hearing the rapid, successive discharge of six artillery pieces.

Thomas deployed 23,000 men in four divisions with brigades in line—from left to right (north to south), the divisions of Baird (brigades of Col. Edward H. Phelps, Col. Ferdinand Van Derveer, and Brig. Gen. John B. Turchin), Wood (brigades of Brig. Gens. Samuel Beatty, August Willich, and William Babcock Hazen), Sheridan (brigades of Brig. Gen. George D. Wagner, Col. Charles Garrison Harker, and Col. Francis Trowbridge Sherman), and Johnson (brigades of Col. William L. Stoughton and Brig. Gen. William Carlin). Each brigade consisted of two lines, one behind the other, with skirmishers leading the way.

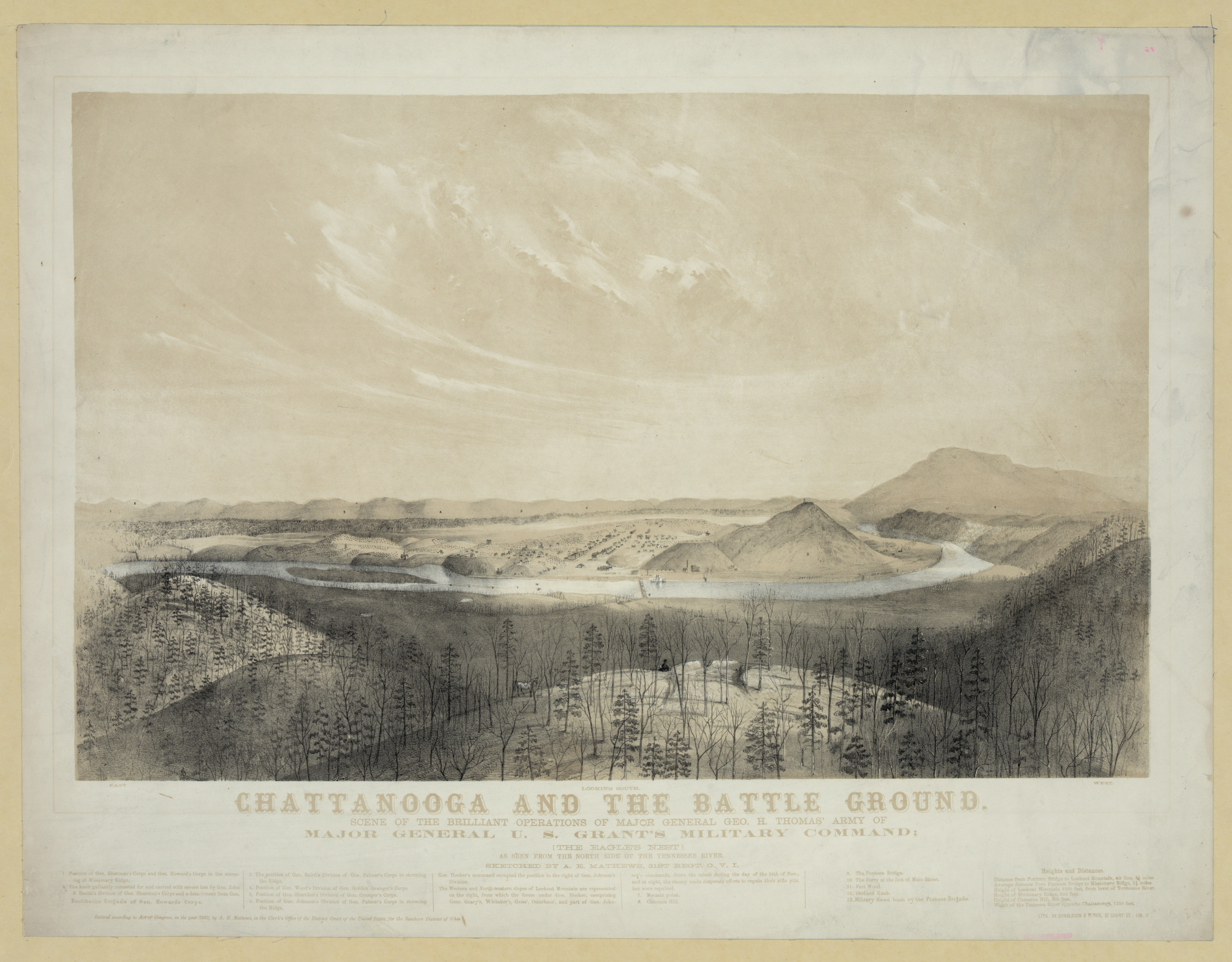
View of Chattanooga in the foreground, across the Tennessee river, with unionist fortifications around the town. This view shows Missionary Ridge across the horizon on the left, and Lookout Mountain in the far distance on the right. These natural formations offered strong defensive positions and besieged the Union army in Chattanooga with little logistical avenues. Lookout Mountain was stormed on November 24, and Missionary Ridge the day after.

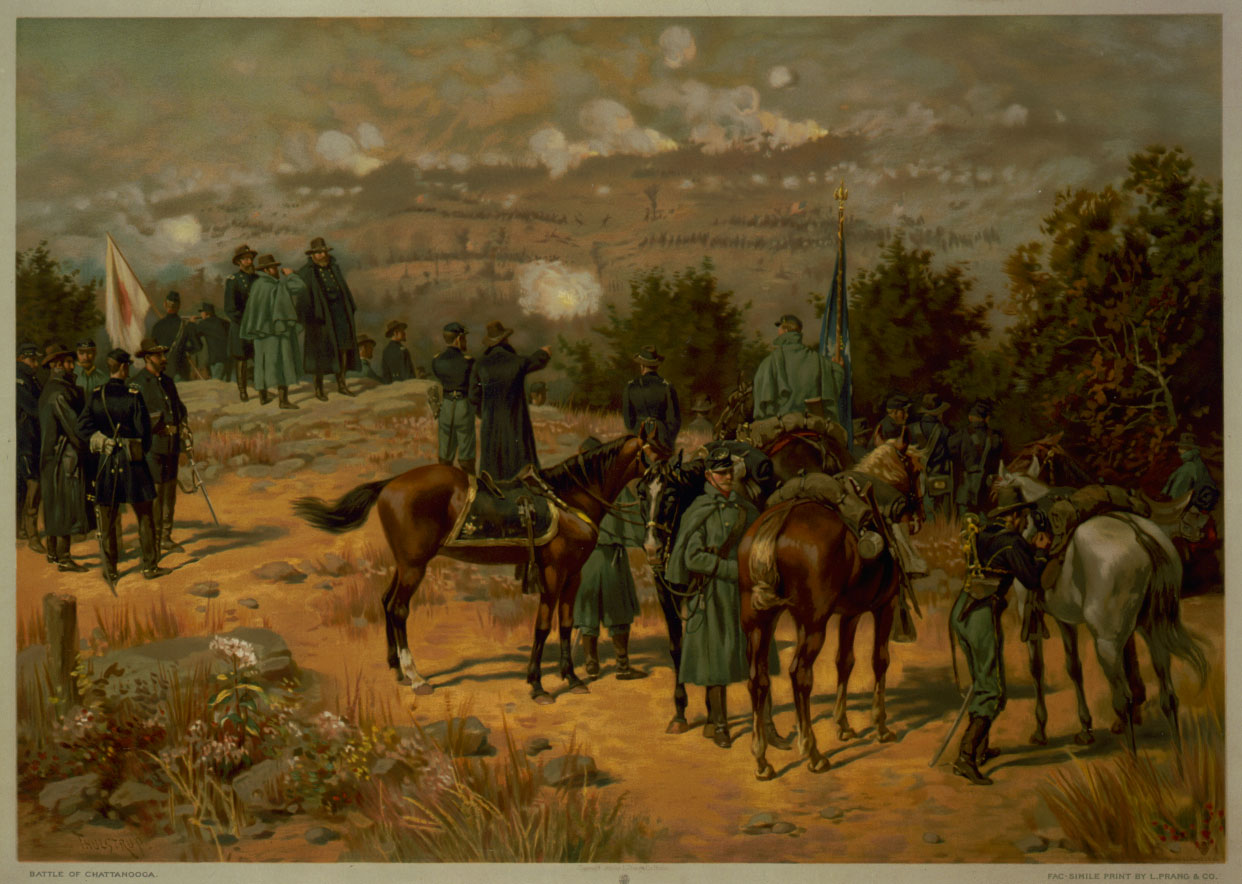
Battle of Chattanooga by Thure de Thulstrup. Ulysses S. Grant uses a field glass to follow the Union assault on Missionary Ridge. Grant is joined by Generals Gordon Granger (left) and George H. Thomas.

About 20,000 Confederates were defending the center of the ridge against which Thomas's men marched, overlapping the Union approach on both ends. From right to left (north to south) were Cheatham's division (brigades of Brig. Gens. Edward C. Walthall, John C. Moore, and John K. Jackson), Hindman's division (commanded by Brig. Gen. J. Patton Anderson, brigades of Brig. Gens. Alfred J. Vaughan, Zachariah C. Deas, and Arthur M. Manigault), Breckinridge's division (commanded by Brig. Gen. William B. Bate, brigades of Brig. Gen. Joseph H. Lewis, Col. R. C. Tyler, and Brig. Gen. Jesse J. Finley), and Stewart's division (brigades of Col. Randall L. Gibson, Brig. Gen. Otho F. Strahl, Brig. Gen. Marcellus Augustus Stovall, and Col. James T. Holtzclaw).

Around 3:40 pm, the signal guns fired before Baird could brief Turchin. Some regimental officers claimed to get conflicting orders from the same brigadier. When asked where he was to stop, Willich told one officer, "I don't know. At Hell, I expect." Sheridan sent an orderly back to Granger inquiring whether the objective was the base or the top of the ridge, but the signal guns fired before he got an answer. Wagner, Turchin, and Carlin thought they were supposed to carry the ridge top. Most officers were guided only by what the units on either side of them did.

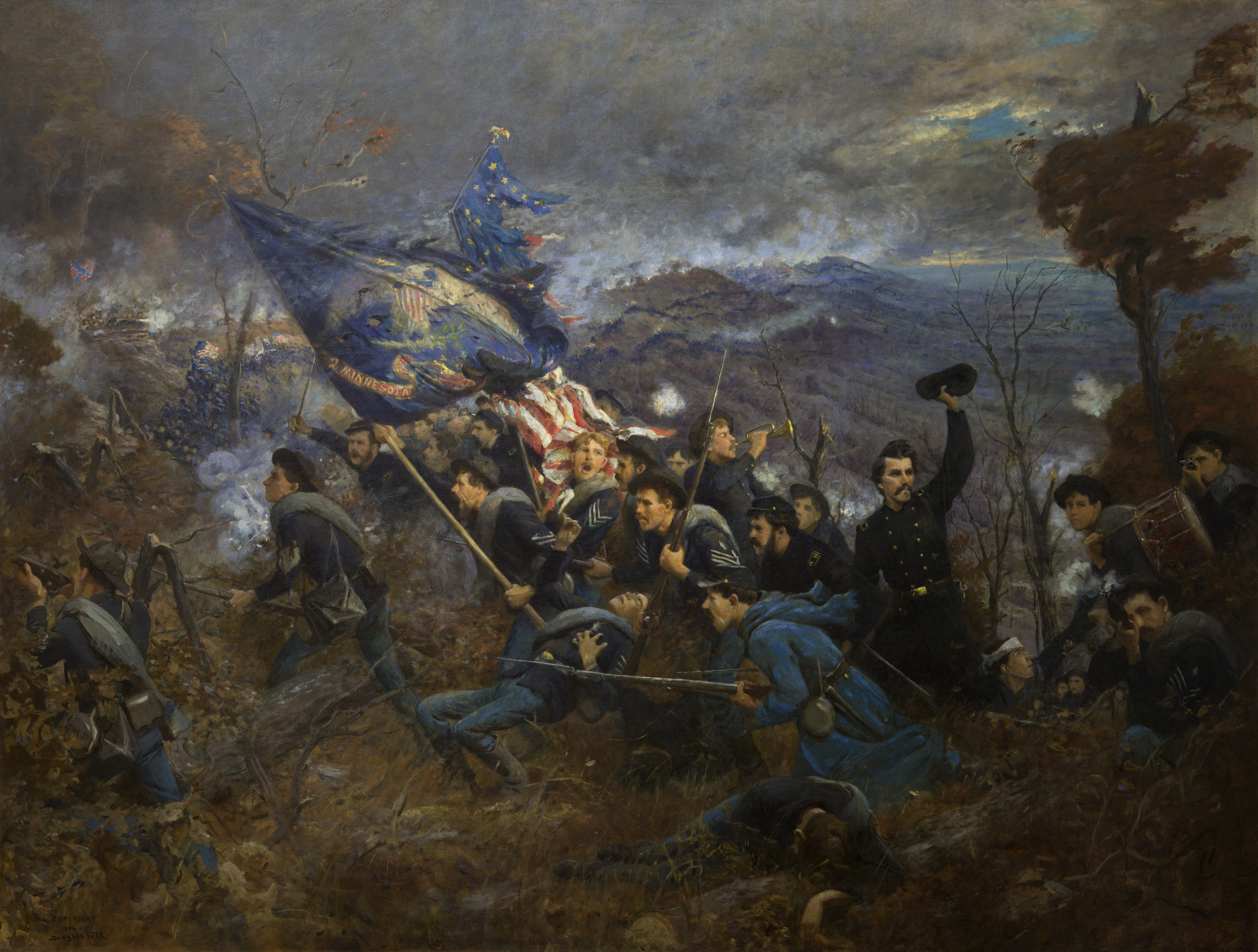
The Second Minnesota Regiment at Missionary Ridge by Douglas Volk.

The 9,000 Confederates holding the rifle pits at the base of the ridge were also plagued by conflicting orders. Some were ordered to fire a volley then retreat, others to hold their ground. Those who stayed to fight were swamped by the superior Union numbers. The Union tide was irresistible, with charging men shouting, "Chickamauga! Chickamauga!" Many of the Confederates were captured, while the rest started the 300– to 400-ft climb to the ridge top in fear of being shot in the back. Those who escaped were completely winded by the effort and in no shape to defend themselves for several minutes.

The 100 Confederate cannons lining the top of the ridge initially hit few of their enemies during the Union rush, but once the Union soldiers stopped at the rifle pits, they began to zero in on them. The Confederate riflemen also poured in their fire causing several Union casualties. After several minutes, some Union unit commanders moved their men forward to get out of the worst fire. Willich's skirmishers started advancing up the ridge without orders. Deciding that following them was preferable to being massacred in the rifle pits, Willich gave orders to advance, although several of his units were already doing so. Seeing this, Hazen and Beatty also ordered their first lines up. When Wood reached the rifle pits, the men in the second line begged him to order them up, as well. Wood sent them forward.

Grant's order to halt at the rifle pits at the base of the ridge was misunderstood by far too many of the generals charged with executing it. Some doubted the order because they thought it absurd to stop an attack at the instant when the attackers would be most vulnerable to fire from the crest and to a counterattack. Others apparently received garbled versions of the order.

— Peter Cozzens, The Shipwreck of Their Hopes

While Cleburne skillfully made the terrain work for him at Tunnel Hill, Confederate dispositions along the central and southern portions of Missionary Ridge allowed the terrain to work for the attackers. ... In the final analysis, the strength of the seemingly impregnable Missionary Ridge position turned out to be mostly a bluff.

— Steven E. Woodworth, Six Armies in Tennessee

Grant was shocked when he saw the Union troops climbing the ridge. He asked first Thomas then Granger who had given the orders. Neither general claimed responsibility, but Granger replied, "When those fellows get started, all hell can't stop them." Granger then sent a courier to Wood allowing him permission to take the ridge top, if he thought it possible. Several messengers went out at about this time with differing orders, leading to more confusion.

On the far left, Phelps and Van Derveer captured the rifle pits and held their position. Having negotiated some rough ground, Turchin's brigade lagged behind, but as soon as his men overran the rifle pits, the "Mad Russian" immediately urged his men up the ridge. Before Baird could send his other two brigades, he received an order to halt.

Wagner and Harker's men started climbing soon after Wood's brigades. Wagner got halfway up before he received an order that he was to stop at the base of the ridge. He ordered his men to pull back. As they did, they suffered heavy losses from the elated Confederate defenders. Wagner's brigade suffered more casualties, around 22%, than any other brigade in the assault. When Wagner and some of Harker's men returned to the rifle pits, they saw that Wood's division on their left and units of their own division on the right were still moving uphill. Disgusted that a rival division was getting ahead, Wagner sent his second line up the ridge. Sheridan soon ordered Harker back up, also. To their right, Francis Sherman's brigade faced an entrenched line about half of the way up the ridge, and had hard going. On the far right, Johnson's two brigades faced determined resistance at the rifle pits, and were slow in starting up the ridge.

The Confederate line first cracked at Bird's Mill Road, at about 5 pm. One of Willich's regiments, joined by two of Hazen's, worked its way within 50 yards of the Confederate breastworks. Protected by a roll of ground, they crept closer, then with a rush they leapt over the works belonging to Col. William F. Tucker's brigade. Surprised, the nearest defenders surrendered or fled for their lives. Alertly, the Union field officers swung their regiments to the right and left and began rolling up the Confederate line. Tucker bravely rallied his men, but by this time, Willich and Hazen's men were flooding over the breastworks.

Since Bragg had not provided for a tactical reserve and the narrow ridgetop left no place for one, his defenses were only a thin crust. To seal off the breach, the Southern generals were placed on the horns of a dilemma. When they found Union troops on their flank, they had to pull regiments out of their defense line for a counterattack. This weakened the main line of resistance just as the Union brigades to their front were swarming up to the crest.

Once atop the ridge, Hazen swung his brigade south. The Confederate lines in this direction were held by Brig. Gen. Alexander W. Reynolds's brigade, whose men had to endure a hard climb from the base of the ridge. Hit in front and flank, most of Reynolds's tired men melted away. Continuing south, Hazen flanked Col. R. C. Tyler's brigade of Bate's division out of position, allowing Wagner's brigade to reach the crest. Bate's Florida Brigade was soon driven away, allowing Harker's men to reach the top. According to the diary from a man in the 7th Florida Infantry Regiment, Company K, the Union troops were able to move artillery pieces into place by disguising the guns as ambulances. The Rebels held their fire, falling for the ruse, until the guns were uncovered and opened fire. Col. Randall L. Gibson's brigade was defeated by Francis Sherman's men. Dogged by tough resistance and very steep slopes, Johnson's two brigades took the longest to climb the ridge, Carlin's men finally reaching the top around 5:30 pm. Seeing that his position was hopeless, Stewart pulled the brigades of Brig. Gens. Otho F. Strahl and Marcellus A. Stovall off the ridge.

Meanwhile, Willich wheeled to the north and began crushing the flank of Anderson's division. Willich's success assisted Beatty's brigade to get to the top. The two brigades first drove off Brig. Gen. Arthur M. Manigault's men and continued rolling north. As they came up the ridge, the Union brigades of Turchin, Van Derveer, and Phelps (who was killed near the crest) added their weight to the assault against the Confederate brigades of Brig. Gens. Zachariah C. Deas, Alfred J. Vaughan, and John K. Jackson. Some Confederate soldiers resisted stubbornly, but many panicked and ran when they realized that Union troops were bearing down on them from the flank. Often, the Southern infantry fled before the supporting artillerists could escape with their cannons. In this manner, Anderson's entire division and Cheatham's left flank brigades of Brig. Gens. Jackson and Moore were routed. The northward Federal advance was only stopped by the stout fighting of Walthall's brigade and nightfall. Cheatham, Gist, Stevenson, and Cleburne were able to get their divisions away more or less intact, although the Confederate soldiers were demoralized and chagrined by their defeat.

The Army of the Cumberland's ascent of Missionary Ridge was one of the war's most dramatic events. Military historians Herman Hattaway and Archer Jones contend that the Battle of Missionary Ridge was "the war's most notable example of a frontal assault succeeding against entrenched defenders holding high ground." A Union officer remembered that

Little regard to formation was observed. Each battalion assumed a triangular shape, the colors at the apex. ... [a] color-bearer dashes ahead of the line and falls. A comrade grasps the flag. ... He, too, falls. Then another picks it up ... waves it defiantly, and as if bearing a charmed life, he advances steadily towards the top ...

By 6:00 pm, the center of Bragg's line had broken completely and fled in panic, requiring the abandonment of Missionary Ridge and a headlong retreat eastward to South Chickamauga Creek. The sole exception to the panicked flight was Cleburne's command, his division augmented by two brigades from another division. As the only command not in complete disarray, it was the last unit to withdraw and formed the rear guard of Bragg's army as it retreated eastward. Only Sheridan tried to pursue beyond Missionary Ridge, but he finally gave up late that night when he clearly was being supported by neither Granger nor Thomas.

=== Hooker at Rossville Gap ===
After Maj. Gen. Joseph Hooker's command left Lookout Mountain around 10:00 am and moved east, they encountered a significant obstacle. The bridges across Chattanooga Creek, about a mile from Rossville Gap, had been burned by the Confederates as they withdrew the night before, and the creek was running high. Brig. Gen. Peter Joseph Osterhaus assigned a 70-man pioneer unit to start rebuilding one bridge, while men of the 27th Missouri created a rickety footbridge and began crossing one by one. Hooker decided to leave his guns and wagons behind so that all of his infantry could cross first, but his advance was delayed about three hours and the bulk of his force did not reach Rossville Gap until 3:30 pm.

Breckinridge was absent while the Union attack wrecked his corps. Worried about his left flank, he rode to the end of his line in the early afternoon. At 3:30 pm, about the time Thomas launched his four-division attack on Missionary Ridge, Breckinridge visited Stewart's left flank brigade of Col. James T. Holtzclaw, whose commander pointed to the southwest, where Hooker's men were busily bridging Chattanooga Creek. Concerned about Rossville Gap, which lay undefended beyond his left flank, Breckinridge ordered Holtzclaw to send a couple of regiments to hold the position. It was too late; by the time the Southerners reached the gap, Osterhaus's division had already marched through. Lt. J. Cabell Breckinridge, the general's son and aide-de-camp, rode into a group from the 9th Iowa and was captured.

Hooker quickly faced his troops to the north and organized a three-pronged attack. He sent Osterhaus along a trail east of Missionary Ridge, Cruft onto the ridge itself, and Geary along the western face of the ridge. Holtzclaw faced his men south and put up a fight, but Cruft and Osterhaus soon began herding the outnumbered Confederates north along Missionary Ridge. Hearing a tremendous racket to the north, Breckinridge finally rode off to find out what was wrong. As Holtzclaw retreated before Hooker's command, he eventually bumped into Col. Anson G. McCook's 2nd Ohio of Carlin's brigade, now astride the ridge. Surrounded by superior forces on four sides, about 700 of Holtzclaw's men surrendered, along with soldiers from the other brigades of Stewart's division.

== Aftermath ==
During the night, Bragg ordered his army to withdraw toward Chickamauga Station on the Western and Atlantic Railroad (currently the site of Lovell Air Field) and the following day began retreating from there toward Dalton, Georgia, in two columns over two routes. The pursuit ordered by Grant was effectively thwarted by Cleburne's rearguard defense at the Battle of Ringgold Gap.

Casualties for the Union Army during the Battles for Chattanooga (Orchard Knob, Lookout Mountain, and Missionary Ridge) amounted to 5,824 (753 killed, 4,722 wounded, and 349 missing) of about 56,000 engaged; Confederate casualties were 6,667 (361 killed, 2,160 wounded, and 4,146 missing, mostly prisoners) of about 44,000. Southern losses may have been higher; Grant claimed 6,142 prisoners. In addition, the Union Army seized 40 cannons and 69 limbers and caissons. When a chaplain asked General Thomas whether the dead should be sorted and buried by state, in the new military cemetery, Thomas replied "Mix 'em up. I'm tired of states' rights."

The Confederate enthusiasm that had risen so high after Chickamauga had been dashed at Chattanooga. One of the Confederacy's two major armies was routed. The Union now held undisputed control of the state of Tennessee, including Chattanooga, the "Gateway to the Lower South." The city became the supply and logistics base for Sherman's 1864 Atlanta campaign, as well as for the Army of the Cumberland, and Grant had won his final battle in the West prior to receiving command of all Union armies in March 1864.

== Gallery ==
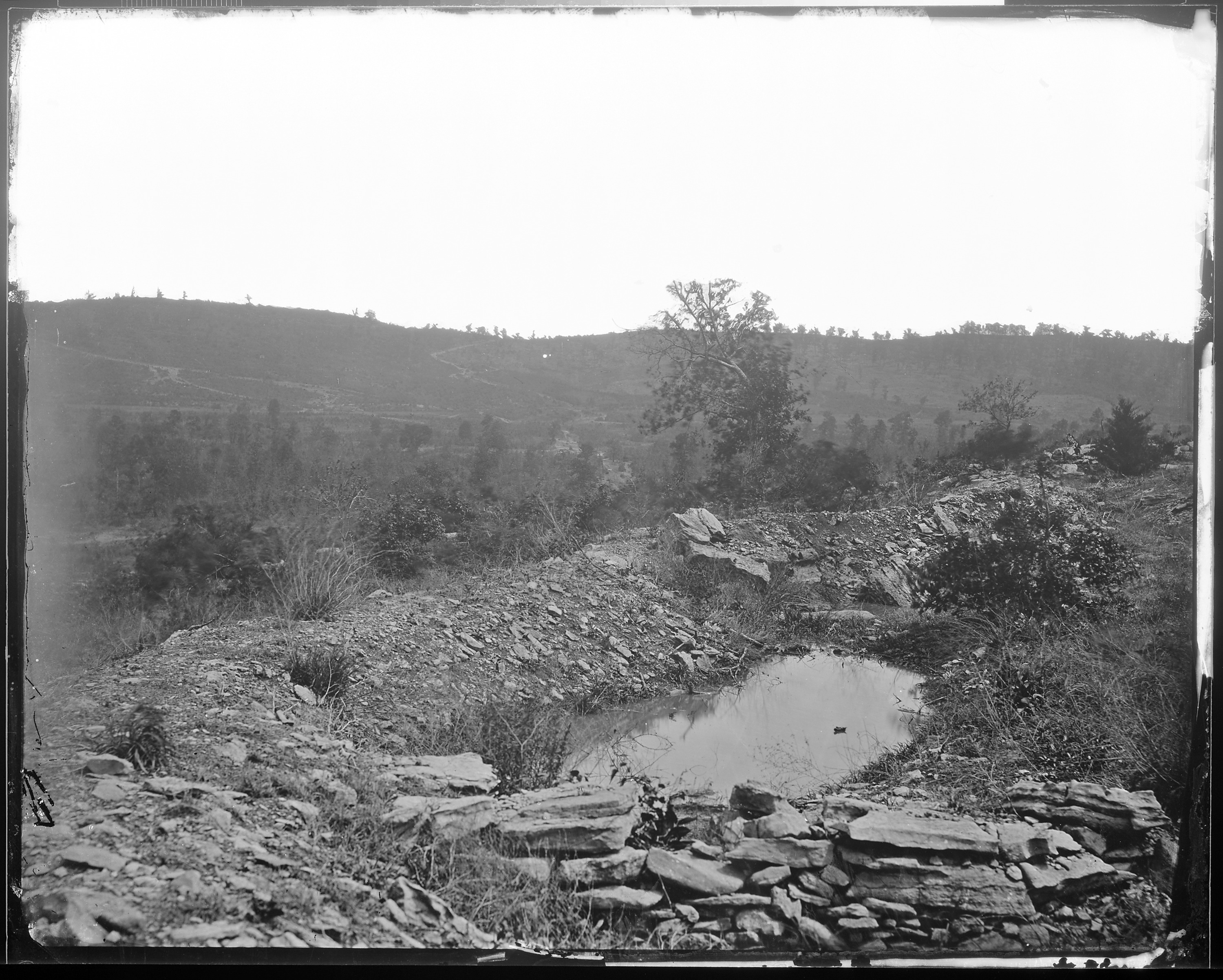
Missionary Ridge in the distance, viewed from Orchard Knob

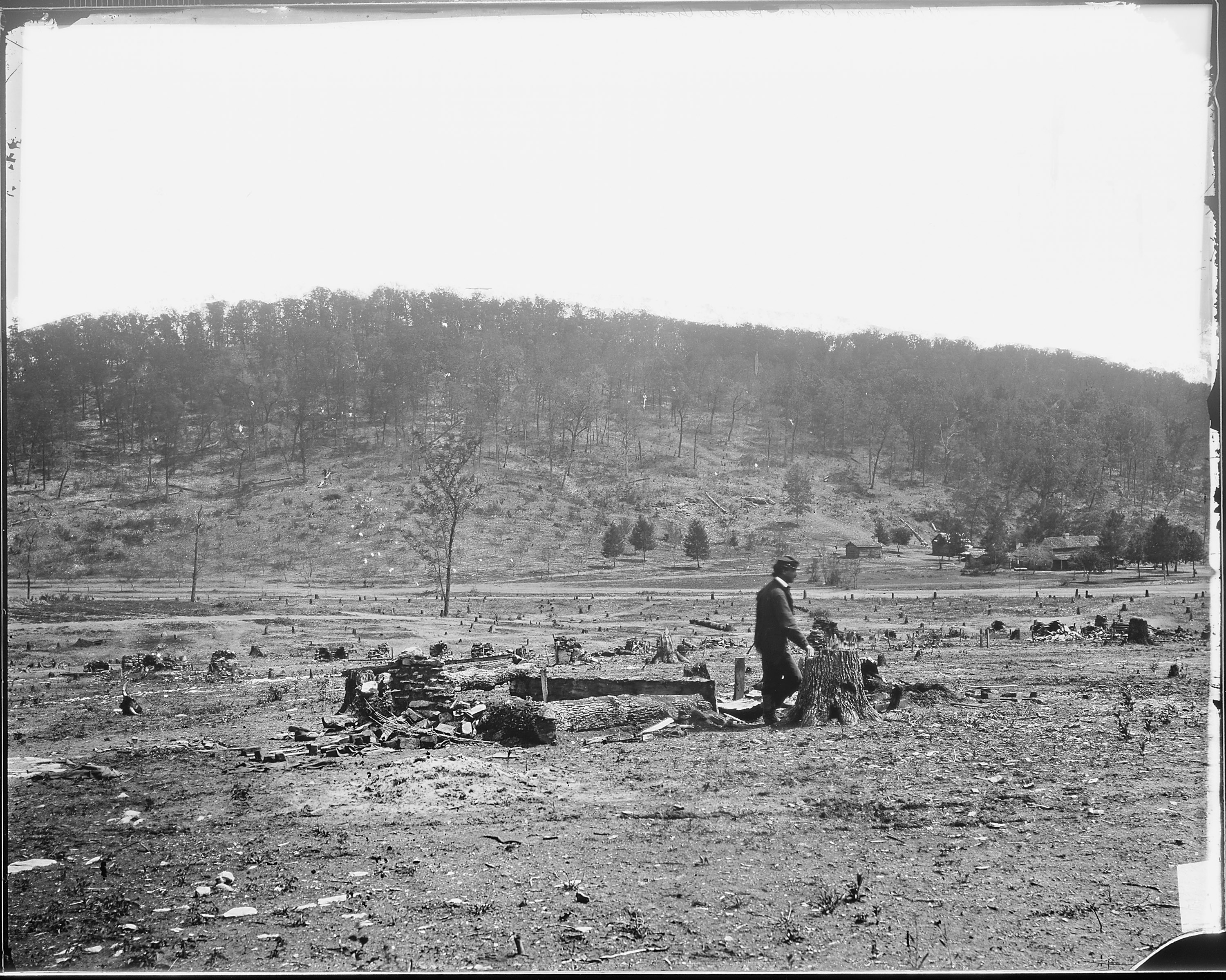
Battlefield, Missionary Ridge, Tenn. 1864

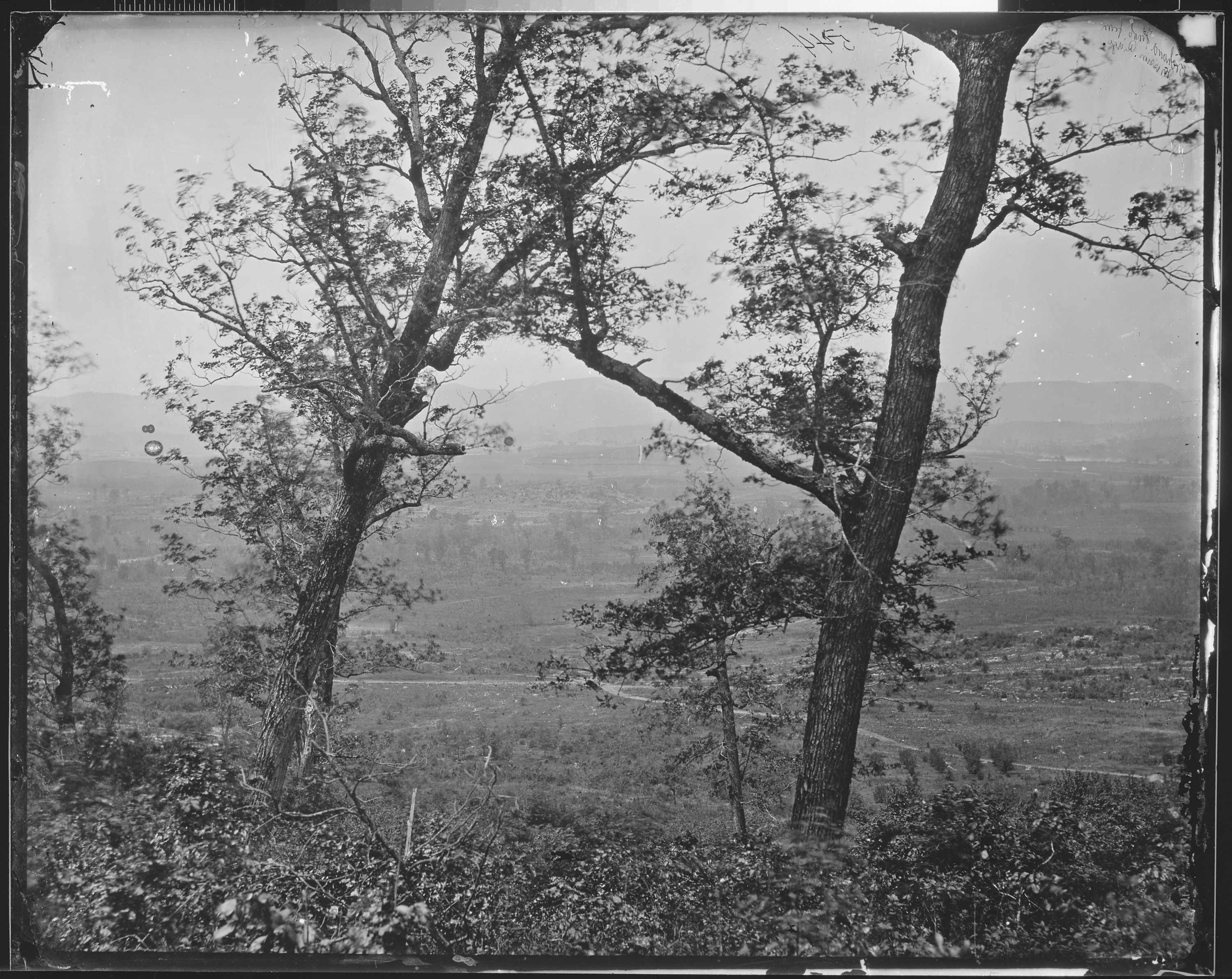
Orchard Knob from Missionary Ridge

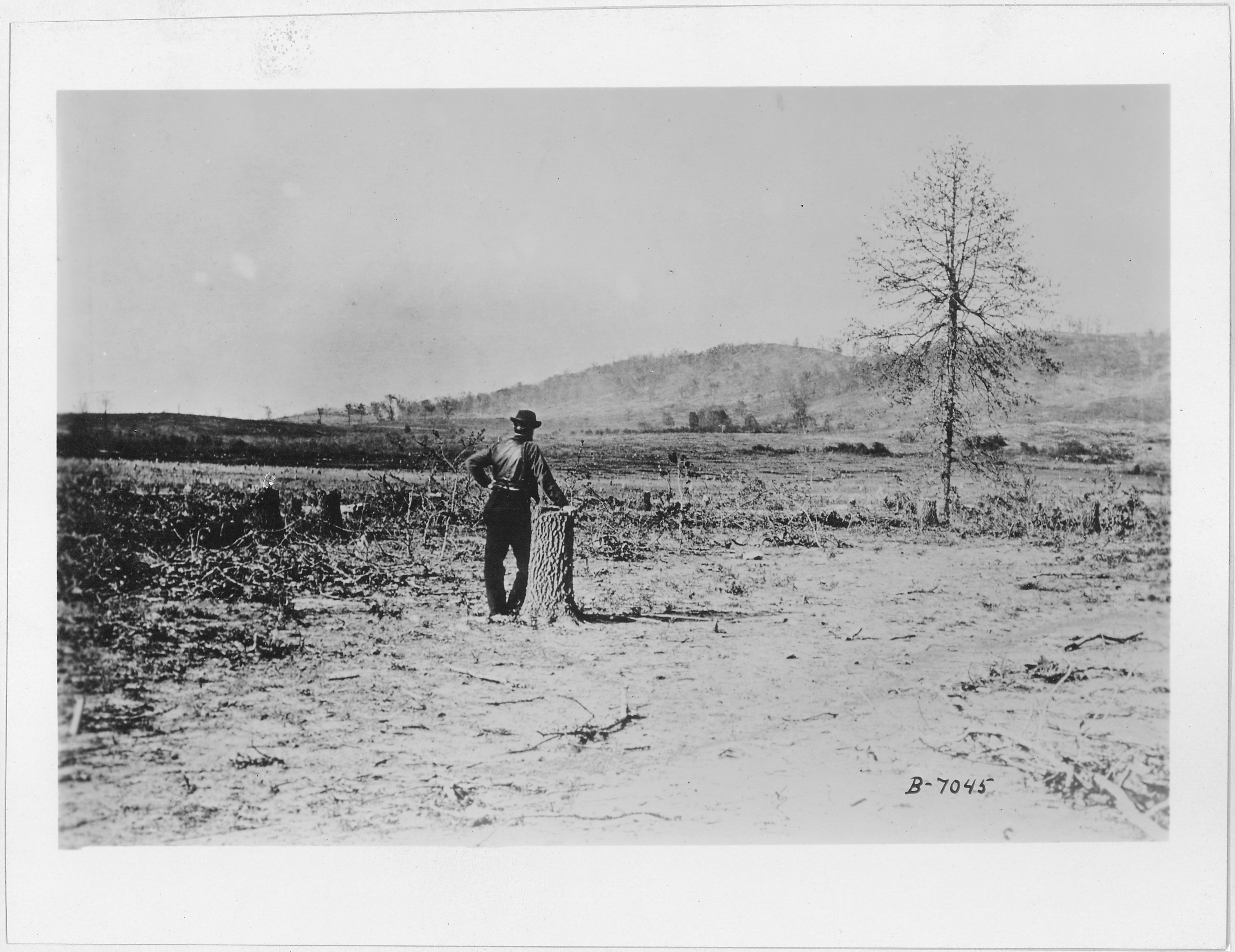
Missionary Ridge in the distance

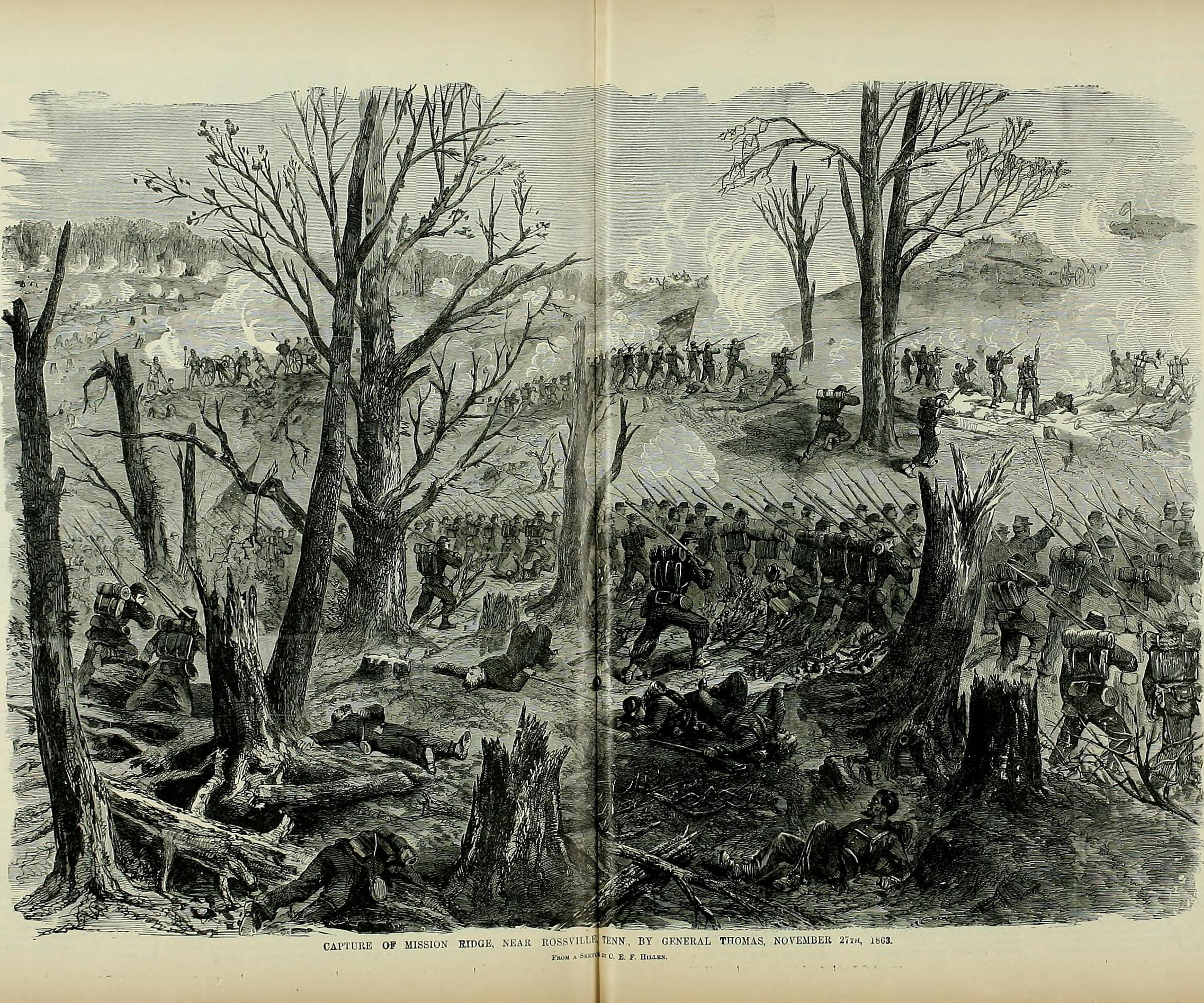
Troops under General Thomas capture Missionary Ridge

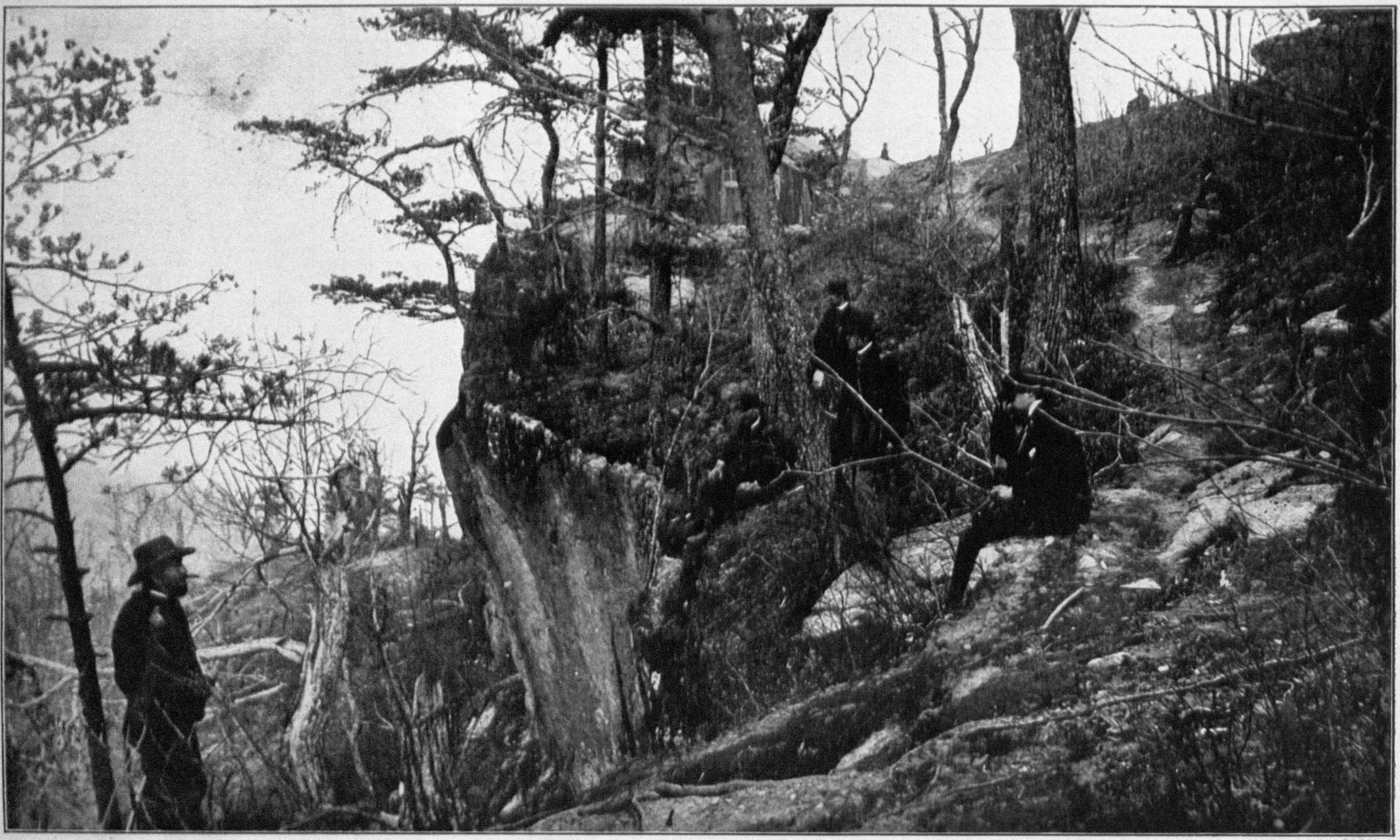
General Grant (lower left) and Staff at Lookout Mountain

== See also ==
- Troop engagements of the American Civil War, 1863
- List of costliest American Civil War land battles
- Armies in the American Civil War
- Bibliography of the American Civil War
- Bibliography of Ulysses S. Grant
