= Eoghain Ó Cianáin =

Eoghain Ó Cianáin, alias Owen Keynan, is listed as of Cappervarget, County Kildare in a Patent Roll of 1540, which states he was a harper and a servant of Gerald FitzGerald, 9th Earl of Kildare. Captain Francis O'Neill notes that he was also term a rymour, a poet, and apparently was blind. He had a son, Cornelius Ó Cianáin, known as Cornelius the Bard.

The Ó Cianáin family included people such as the historian/genealogist Adhamh Ó Cianáin (died 1373) and the travel writer, Tadhg Og Ó Cianáin (died c. 1614).

== See also ==
- Clàrsach
- Amhlaeibh Mac Innaighneorach, Chief Harper of Ireland, died 1168
- Maol Ruanaidh Cam Ó Cearbhaill, tiompanist, murdered Saturday 10 June 1329
- Donell Dubh Ó Cathail, harper to Elizabeth I, c. 1560s-c.1660
- Thomas Connellan (c. 1640/1645 – 1698), composer and harpist
- Turlough O'Carolan (1670-1739), harpist
- Mary O'Hara (1935), harpist
