= Ruaidhri Ó Cianáin =

Irish historian

Ruaidhri Ó Cianáin (died 1387) was an Irish historian.

Described upon his death as "a learned historian without fault", "professor of Oirghialla in history", "chiefe Chronicler of the territory of Uriell". A member of the learned Ó Cianáin (Keenan) family, Ruaidhri was the scribe and compiler of Dunaire Mheig Shamhradháin (Book of Maguran), also known as Leabhar Meig Shamradhain. In the possession for many centuries of the Ó Conor Don family of Clonalis, Castlerea, County Roscommon, but since 1972 National Library of Ireland MS G 1200.

A colophon in it reads Ruaidri O Cianan do sgrib in duanairsea do Thomas mac Brian meic Dondchaid meic Gille na Naem [Mag Shamradhain] ("Ruaidhri Ó Cianáin who penned this poembook of Tomas son of Brian son of Donnchad son of Gilla na Naomh"). This Tomás was chief of Tulach Eachach (Tullyhaw, County Cavan, who died in 1343, so Ruaidhri was writing this dunaire in his lifetime. It is among the earliest post-Norman Irish language manuscripts of any kind to survive, though the compilers, including Ruaidhri, do not seem to have been trained poets.
