= Ó Cianáin =

Ó Cianáin was the name of a Gaelic-Irish Brehon family. They were originally erenaghs of the parish of Cleenish, Lough Erne, but who had served for several centuries as historians to Mag Uidir of Fear Manach (2007, p. 437).

The Annals of Ulster record the death of Giolla na Naomh Ó Cianáin, abbot of Lis Gabhail (Lisgoole), on 12 August 1345 (actually 1348).

One of the family's most noted productions was Leabhar Adhamh Ó Cianáin, written in or about the 1340s by Adhamh Ó Cianáin (died 1373) by and for himself, and out of the book of his teacher, Seán Mór Ó Dubhagáin (died 1372).

The Annals of the Four Masters cite the deaths of members of the family under the years 1348, 1373, 1387, 1400, 1405, 1459, 1569, 1483.

The surname is anglicised as Keenan.

== See also ==
- Adhamh Ó Cianáin, died 1373
- Eoghain Ó Cianáin (fl. 1540) harper and servant of Gerald FitzGerald, 9th Earl of Kildare
- Tadhg Ó Cianáin/Tadhg Óg Ó Cianáin, writer, died Rome, November/December 1614.
- Cú Chonnacht Ó Cianáin, d. 1615, was a rymer or chronicler to Rory Maguire.
- Thady Ó Cianáin, composer, fl. 17th century
- Owen Keenan, harper, born 1725
- John Keenan (Medal of Honor), 1840s-1906
- Brian Keenan (Irish republican), IRA, 1942–2008
- Brian Keenan (musician), 1943–85
- Paddy Keenan, born 1950), uilleann piper
- Brian Keenan (writer), born 1951, kidnap victim
- Brigid Keenan, author and journalist

== Sources ==
- The Learned Family of Ó Cianáin/Keenan, by Nollaig Ó Muraíle, in Clogher Record, pp. 396–402, 2005.
- http://www.irishtimes.com/ancestor/surname/index.cfm?fuseaction=Go.&UserID=
