= Cú Chonnacht Ó Cianáin =

Cú Chonnacht Ó Cianáin, d. 1615, was a rymer or chronicler to Rory Maguire.

He was apparently the first man racked in Ireland, the instrument being used most severely upon him during an interrogation into a bungled insurrection in early summer 1615. On 31 July of that year, he and five others were condemned to death in Derry, and he is believed to have been hanged shortly afterwards.

He is also described as a yeoman of Moygh, a place somewhere between Ballymoney and the Bann, County Antrim. He was a brother of Tadhg Og Ó Cianáin.

The surname Ó Cianáin is now generally rendered as Keenan.

== Sources ==
- The Learned Family of Ó Cianáin/Keenan, Nollaig Ó Muraíle, in Clougher Record, pp. 387–436, 2005.
- Turas na dTaoiseach nUltach as Éirinn from Ráth Maoláin to Rome: Tadhg O Cianáin’s contemporary narrative of the so-called ‘Flight of the Earls, 1607-8, Nollaig Ó Muraíle(editor), Four Courts Press, Dublin, 2007. ISBN 978-88-901692-1-2
