= Vernon Keenan =

Vernon Keenan may refer to:

- Vernon Keenan (law enforcement official)
- Vernon Keenan (coaster designer)
