= Annals of Duiske =

Irish annal

The Annals of Duiske is an Irish annal, created from 1513.

== Outline ==
Domhnall Riabhach Mac Murchadha Caomhánach, a son of Gerald mac Murchadha Caomhánach, became Kings of Leinster during 1478. In 1475, he had "granted eight pence annually from every plough in his territory to the abbey of Duiske." One of Domhnall's sons, Cathal Mac Murchadha Caomhánach (anglicised Charles Kavanagh), became its abbot in 1501 and in 1513 he directed one of his monks to compile the annals of Ireland. This book was known as the "Annals of Duiske" or "The Ancient Book of Graig" but it was lost. However, surviving fragments were published by Kenneth Nicholls in Peritia in 1983.

== See also ==
- Irish annals
