= Maguire (disambiguation) =

Maguire is an Irish surname.

Maguire may also refer to:

- Jerry Maguire, 1996 film starring Tom Cruise
- Maguire Seven, Irish family accused in the 1970s for bomb-making; later exonerated
- Maguire University, fictitious college invented in 1963 by a group of Chicago high school basketball coaches
- Molly Maguires, Irish secret society; established 1843; later transplanted to the US
- Sam Maguire Cup, award for the winning Gaelic football team
- The Molly Maguires, 1970 film about the Irish secret society
- Withers-Maguire House, historic house in Ocoee, Florida, US
- Harry Maguire, English professional footballer

== See also ==
- McGuire (disambiguation)
