= Bluford Sims =

Bluford Marion Sims was a Confederate officer who settled in Ocoee, Florida. He founded the town and was a citrus grower He moved to Florida from North Carolina and built a home by Starke Lake. He held public offices in Ocoee. He sold land owned by African Americans who were killed or fled after the Ocoee massacre. The main road through Ocoee and its Confederate veterans group are named for him.

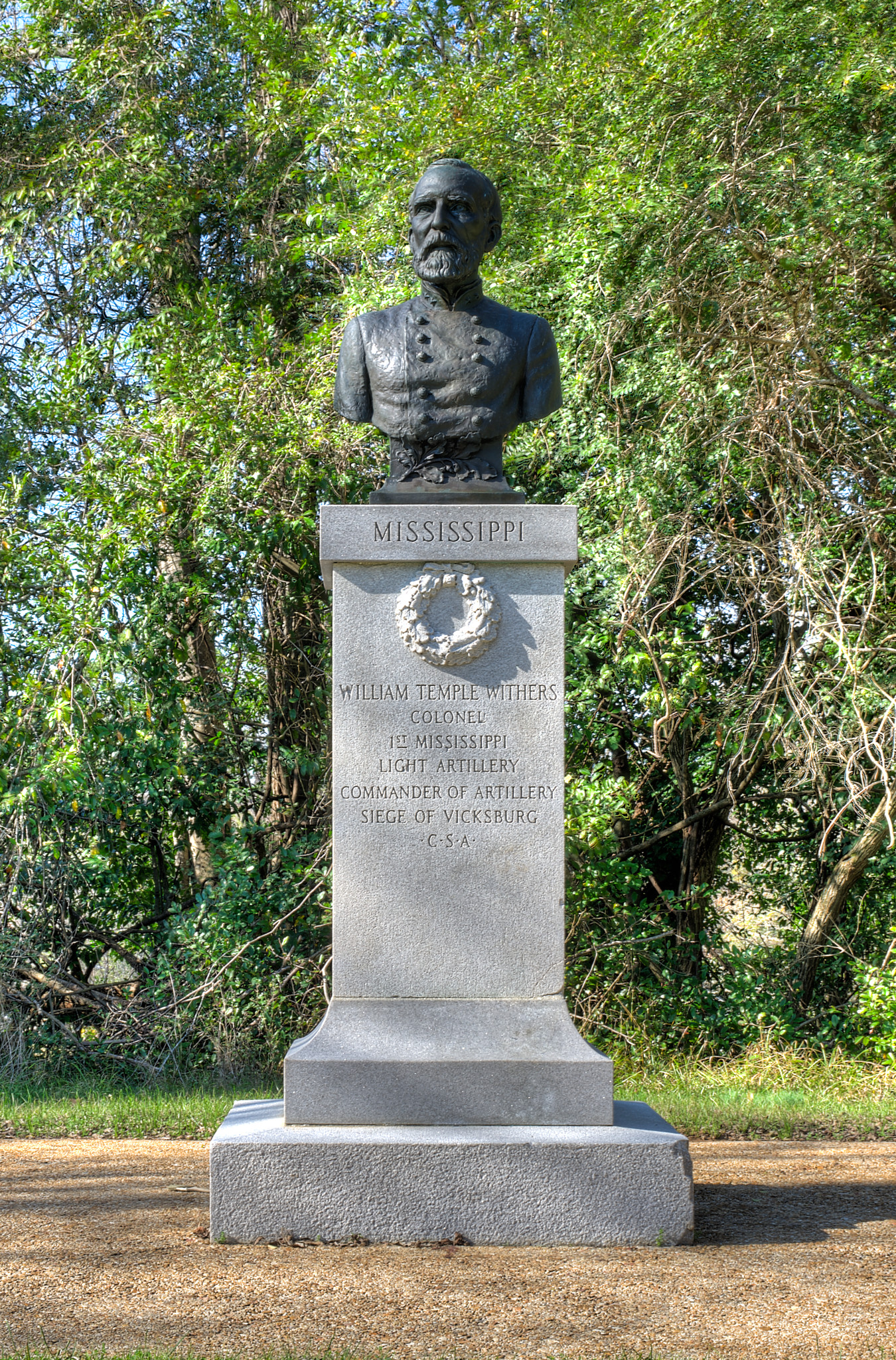
Bust of William T. Withers

William Temple Withers (1825–1889), a Mexican War veteran and Confederate general from Kentucky who led soldiers from Kentucky and Mississippi, wintered in Ocoee. He founded Morehead Normal School that became Morehead State University. He owned the Withers-Maguire House and his memoir was published. Bluford donated the land on which Withers and his family built the Ocoee Christian Church.

Sims handled land sales of properties owned by blacks after the massacre. B. M. Sims advertised citrus groves for sale that had been owned by blacks until those that survived fled after the Ocoee massacre. In 2018, commemorations of the election day violence and its aftermath were organized.

The local chapter of the Sons of Confederate Veterans is named for Sims as is Bluford Avenue in Ocoee, the main thoroughfare.
