= Tadhg Ó Cianáin =

Irish writer (died c. 1614)

Tadhg Óg Ó Cianáin (Irish pronunciation: [t̪ˠəiɡ oːɡ oː ˈciənˠaːnʲ]) (died c. 1614) was an Irish writer.

He was the author of Turas na dTaoiseach / the Departure of the Lords, a diary of the Flight of the Earls, kept from September 1607 to November 1608, from Rathmullen, County Donegal to Rome. It is the earliest example in Irish of the diary genre.

== Origins ==
Ó Cianáin was a member of a professional Irish learned family who were originally erenaghs of the parish of Cleenish, Lough Erne, but who had served for several centuries as historians to Mag Uidir of Fear Manach (2007, p. 437).

One of the family's most noted productions was Leabhar Adhamh Ó Cianáin, written in or about the 1340s by Adhamh Ó Cianáin (died 1373), by and for himself, and out of the book of his teacher, Seán Mór Ó Dubhagáin (died 1372). The Annals of the Four Masters cite the deaths of members of the family under the years 1387, 1400, 1405, 1459, 1569, and 1483.

Tadhg had at least one sibling, Cu Chonnacht Ó Cianáin (died 1615), a rhymer or chronicler to Rory Maguire.

== In the service of Ó Néill ==
Ó Cianáin appears to have entered the service of Ó Néill during the course of the Nine Years' War; he was one of seven of the surname located in the townland of Portnelligan, Tynan parish, south-west of Armagh pardoned on 6 December 1602 (2007, p. 20).

Ó Muraíle relates Ó Fiaich's suggestion that "Hugh O Neill had granted them land in Co. Armagh, since it was not the Ó Cianáins' native country. Against that, however, there is a townland called Drumadd, north of Portnelligan and close to Armagh city, whose Irish name is Dromad Uí Cianáin. In addition, it may be noted that one of Co. Armagh's principal surnames in 1659 was O Keenan." (2007, p. 21).

== Turas na dTaoiseach ==
Brady and Cleave made the following assessment:

"Tadhg kept a detailed account of the flight from Ulster and the journey to Rome, not on a high level of political reason and plans, but a plain man's view of what actually happened each day, what they ate and did, how they felt, what the various towns they passed through were like, culminating with their arrival in Rome and the subsequent arrival there of the king of France."

The miraculous survival of Tadhg's unique manuscript-copy (MS A 21 Ó Cléirigh collection, University College Dublin). Tadhg, in his immediate pre-flight year, a resident of Portnelligan, Tynan, County Armagh, listed with six other Ó Cianáins as among the followers of Henry Óg Ó Neill in a pardon list 'fiant' of December 1602 (Cú Chonnacht, Seán mac Conchobhair, Pádraig Óg, Uaithne, Seán mac Pádraig Mhóir). Tadhg's property—fifteen cows, eight calves, one garron, one hackney, twenty-five swine, all valued at £22.6s.3d—were forfeited but later returned to his wife at the intervention of the Earl of Thomond, who was a relative of hers.

Tadhg died in Rome, apparently late in 1614. He was a brother to Cu Chonnacht Ó Cianáin.

== Relatives in Ireland ==
In the aftermath of the departure, Ó Cianáin's property, valued at £22 6 shillings 2 pence, was seized, but later returned to his wife at the behest of Donogh O'Brien, 4th Earl of Thomond. Thomond claimed to be a relative of Ó Cianáin's wife, possibly via the mysterious Donnchadh mac Mathgamhain Ó Briain, who travelled with Rory Ó Donnell, 1st Earl of Tyrconnell. No further information is available on his children, if he had any.

His brother, Cu Chonnacht Ó Cianáin, was tortured on the rack and hanged in Derry in July 1615.

== Other works ==
On 28 March 1627, while collecting materials for what would become the Annals of the Four Masters, Mícheál Ó Cléirigh made use of some hagiographical material written by him, since lost. (Walsh, 1996). Ó Muraíle (2007, p. 22) identifies this text as Ionnarba Mochuda a Rathain (The Banishment of St Mochuda from Rahan)—see Mo Chutu of Lismore. The original manuscript does not appear to have survived.
