= Neenan =

Neenan is a surname. Notable people with the surname include:

- Audrie J. Neenan (born 1950), American actress
- Joe Neenan (born 1959), English footballer

== See also ==
- Keenan
