= Cathal Mac Murchadha Caomhánach =

Irish abbot

Cathal Mac Murchadha Caomhánach, fl. 1450 - c. 1550, Abbot of Duiske.

== Bio ==
A son of Domhnall Riabhach Mac Murchadha Caomhánach (Kings of Leinster in 1478, and a grandson of Gerald Mac Murchadha Caomhánach, Cathal became Abbot of Dusike in 1501, and in 1513 he directed one of his monks to compile the annals of Ireland. This book was known as the "Annals of Duiske" or "The Ancient Book of Graig" but was subsequently lost.[2]. However, surviving fragments were published by Kenneth Nicholls in Peritia in 1983.

One source said of Mac Murchadha Caomhánach: "He was an outstanding scholar and on account of his learning and virtue was consecrated bishop of Leighlin and abbot of Graig. He died in the year 1550 and was a hundred years old."

== See also ==
- Annals of Duiske
- John Clyn
- Irish annals
