= McGuire (disambiguation) =

McGuire is an Irish surname.

McGuire may also refer to:

- McGuire (Formula One), 1977 Formula One constructor from Australia
- McGuire, Arkansas, a ghost town
- McGuire, Missouri, an unincorporated community
- McGuire, Ohio, a ghost town
- Mount McGuire, mountain in Jasper National Park, Alberta, Canada
- McGuire Island (disambiguation), two islands
- McGuire Air Force Base, US Air Force base in Burlington County, New Jersey
- McGuire Nuclear Generating Station, Charlotte, North Carolina, US

== See also ==
- Maguire (disambiguation)
- Mark McGwire
