= Ocoee, Florida =

City in Florida, US

- City
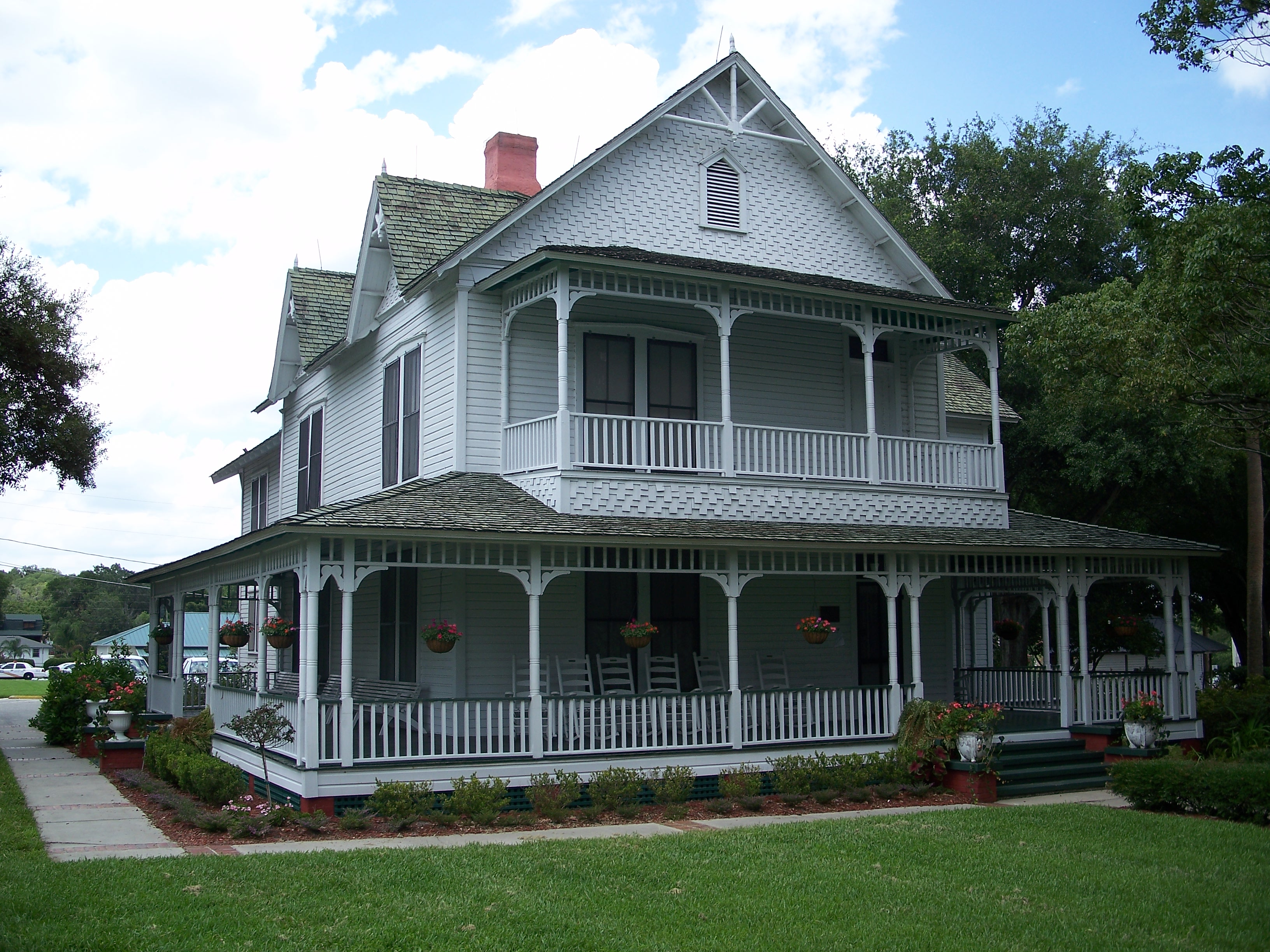
- The Withers-Maguire House

- Seal Logo
- Motto: "The Center of Good Living"
- Location in Orange County and the state of Florida
- Coordinates: 28°35′27″N 81°30′56″W
- Country: United States
- State: Florida
- County: Orange
- Settled (Starke Lake): c. Mid-1850s
- Platted (Ocoee): October 5, 1883-1886
- Incorporated (town): November 22, 1923
- Incorporated (city): 1925

Government
  - Type: Commission-manager
  - Mayor: Rusty Johnson
  - Mayor Pro Tem: Rosemary Wilsen
  - Commissioners: Scott R. Kennedy, Richard Firstner, and Ages Hart
  - City Manager: Robert D. Frank
  - City Clerk: Melanie Sibbitt

Area
  - Total: 16.67 sq mi (43.17 km^{2})
  - Land: 15.61 sq mi (40.43 km^{2})
  - Water: 1.06 sq mi (2.74 km^{2})
- Elevation: 157 ft (48 m)

Population (2020)
  - Total: 47,295
  - Density: 3,029.8/sq mi (1,169.81/km^{2})
- Time zone: UTC-5 (Eastern (EST))
  - Summer (DST): UTC-4 (EDT)
- ZIP code: 34761
- Area codes: 407, 689
- FIPS code: 12-51075
- GNIS feature ID: 2404418
- Website: City of Ocoee

Ocoee (/əˈkoʊ.i/) is a city in Orange County, Florida, United States. It is part of the Orlando–Kissimmee–Sanford, Florida metropolitan statistical area. According to the 2020 US Census, the city had a population of 47,295.

== History ==
=== Founding and early history ===
In the mid-1850s, Dr. J.D. Starke, stricken with malaria, took a group of slaves, similarly stricken, to the north side of an open, pine-wooded lake that provided clear and clean water to avoid further malaria outbreaks. The camp built by the group provided a base of operations from which to commute during the day to work the fields near Lake Apopka and rest at night.

As the camp grew into a village, it took the name Starke Lake, a name the lake upon which the group settled bears to this day. The city's population increased further after the American Civil War as Confederate soldiers and their families settled into the area, including Captain Bluford Sims and General William Temple Withers, who wintered at the location. Captain Sims received a land grant for a 74-acre parcel to the west of Starke Lake in what is now the downtown portion of Ocoee on October 5, 1883. In 1886, Captain Sims, along with a group of original settlers, led an effort to have the town platted and changed the name to Ocoee, after a river he grew up near in Tennessee. Ocoee is a Cherokee Indian word anglicized from uwagahi, meaning "apricot vine place", and this inspired the choice of the city's flower.

Bluford Sims began groundbreaking work in budding wild orange trees while in Ocoee. His commercial citrus nursery was the first in the United States in Ocoee, supplying many other groves in Florida with their first trees, as well as shipping young citrus trees to California. The construction of the Florida Midland Railroad in the 1880s spurred growth in the area and many more settlers moved in.

=== Ocoee massacre ===
On November 2, 1920, after July Perry and Mose Norman, two Black men, attempted to vote and encouraged other Black people to vote, the entire Black population of the town was attacked by a mob organized by the Ku Klux Klan. On the night of the massacre, White World War I veterans from throughout Orange County murdered dozens of African-American residents. At least 24 Black homes were burned, the institutions constituting the Black community were destroyed, and Perry was lynched. Before the massacre, Ocoee's Black population numbered about 500; after the massacre, however, the Black population was nearly eliminated. For more than 40 years, Ocoee remained an all-White sundown town. In 2018, the city commission issued a proclamation formally acknowledging the massacre and declaring that Ocoee is no longer a sundown town.

=== Incorporation and modern history ===
Ocoee was incorporated in 1922 (or 1923) and became a city in 1925.

Highway construction was the impetus for Ocoee's growth in the 20th century. Florida State Road 50 (SR 50) was constructed south of downtown Ocoee in 1959 and provided a direct east-west connection between the city and a growing Orlando and made the town more accessible to housing developers. Florida's Turnpike was opened just south of downtown Ocoee in 1964. In late 1990, Ocoee was connected to Orlando by a western extension of Florida State Road 408 (the East-West Expressway), which then joined the Florida's Turnpike south of SR 50. In 2000, the completion of Florida State Road 429 (the Western Expressway) linked Ocoee with Walt Disney World to the south.

== Geography ==
According to the United States Census Bureau, the city has a total area of 15.7 square miles (40.6 km^{2}), of which 0.97 square miles (2.5 km^{2}) (6.12%) are covered by water.

=== Climate ===
The climate in this area is characterized by hot, humid summers and generally mild winters. According to the Köppen climate classification, the City of Ocoee has a humid subtropical climate zone (Cfa).

Climate data for Orlando (Orlando Int'l), 1991–2020 normals, (Note: Mean monthly maxima and minima (i.e. the highest and lowest temperature readings during an entire month or year) calculated based on data at said location from 1991 to 2020.) extremes 1892–present (Note: Orlando Int'l became the official station of record for Orlando in February 1974.)
Month	Jan	Feb	Mar	Apr	May	Jun	Jul	Aug	Sep	Oct	Nov	Dec	Year
Record high °F (°C)	88 (31)	90 (32)	97 (36)	99 (37)	102 (39)	101 (38)	101 (38)	101 (38)	103 (39)	98 (37)	93 (34)	91 (33)	103 (39)
Mean maximum °F (°C)	83.5 (28.6)	85.5 (29.7)	88.4 (31.3)	91.1 (32.8)	94.5 (34.7)	96.1 (35.6)	96.1 (35.6)	95.4 (35.2)	93.8 (34.3)	91.0 (32.8)	86.7 (30.4)	83.7 (28.7)	97.2 (36.2)
Mean daily maximum °F (°C)	71.8 (22.1)	74.9 (23.8)	78.9 (26.1)	83.6 (28.7)	88.4 (31.3)	90.8 (32.7)	92.0 (33.3)	91.6 (33.1)	89.6 (32.0)	84.7 (29.3)	78.3 (25.7)	73.8 (23.2)	83.2 (28.4)
Daily mean °F (°C)	60.6 (15.9)	63.6 (17.6)	67.3 (19.6)	72.2 (22.3)	77.3 (25.2)	81.2 (27.3)	82.6 (28.1)	82.6 (28.1)	81.0 (27.2)	75.5 (24.2)	68.2 (20.1)	63.3 (17.4)	73.0 (22.8)
Mean daily minimum °F (°C)	49.5 (9.7)	52.4 (11.3)	55.8 (13.2)	60.7 (15.9)	66.3 (19.1)	71.6 (22.0)	73.2 (22.9)	73.7 (23.2)	72.4 (22.4)	66.2 (19.0)	58.2 (14.6)	52.9 (11.6)	62.7 (17.1)
Mean minimum °F (°C)	33.2 (0.7)	36.5 (2.5)	41.3 (5.2)	49.2 (9.6)	58.2 (14.6)	67.5 (19.7)	70.5 (21.4)	70.7 (21.5)	67.8 (19.9)	53.4 (11.9)	44.4 (6.9)	37.6 (3.1)	31.3 (−0.4)
Record low °F (°C)	19 (−7)	19 (−7)	25 (−4)	37 (3)	47 (8)	53 (12)	64 (18)	63 (17)	50 (10)	38 (3)	28 (−2)	18 (−8)	18 (−8)
Average precipitation inches (mm)	2.48 (63)	2.04 (52)	3.03 (77)	2.58 (66)	4.02 (102)	8.05 (204)	7.46 (189)	7.69 (195)	6.37 (162)	3.46 (88)	1.79 (45)	2.48 (63)	51.45 (1,307)
Average precipitation days (≥ 0.01 in)	7.0	6.4	6.8	6.3	8.4	16.2	17.1	17.2	14.2	8.4	6.0	7.1	121.1
Average relative humidity (%)	73.1	71.0	70.3	67.2	70.5	76.4	77.9	79.4	79.1	74.9	74.8	74.5	74.1
Source: NOAA (relative humidity 1961–1990)

== Demographics ==
Historical population
Census	Pop.	Note	%±
1920	815		—
1930	794		−2.6%
1940	702		−11.6%
1950	1,370		95.2%
1960	2,628		91.8%
1970	3,937		49.8%
1980	7,803		98.2%
1990	12,778		63.8%
2000	24,391		90.9%
2010	35,579		45.9%
2020	47,295		32.9%
U.S. Decennial Census

=== Racial and ethnic composition ===
Ocoee racial composition (Hispanics excluded from racial categories) (NH = Non-Hispanic)
Race	Pop 2010	Pop 2020	% 2010	% 2020
White (NH)	19,086	18,029	53.64%	38.12%
Black or African American (NH)	5,968	10,869	16.77%	22.98%
Native American or Alaska Native (NH)	91	115	0.26%	0.24%
Asian (NH)	1,945	3,051	5.47%	6.45%
Pacific Islander or Native Hawaiian (NH)	19	40	0.05%	0.09%
Some other race (NH)	277	857	0.78%	1.81%
Multiracial (NH)	799	2,372	2.25%	5.02%
Hispanic or Latino (any race)	7,394	11,962	20.78%	25.29%
Total	35,579	47,295	100.00%	100.00%

=== 2020 census ===
As of the 2020 census, Ocoee had a population of 47,295. The median age was 37.0 years. 24.0% of residents were under the age of 18 and 12.1% of residents were 65 years of age or older. For every 100 females there were 94.1 males, and for every 100 females age 18 and over there were 90.7 males age 18 and over.

100.0% of residents lived in urban areas, while 0.0% lived in rural areas.

There were 15,859 households in Ocoee, of which 39.4% had children under the age of 18 living in them. Of all households, 54.1% were married-couple households, 14.1% were households with a male householder and no spouse or partner present, and 25.3% were households with a female householder and no spouse or partner present. About 16.8% of all households were made up of individuals and 5.4% had someone living alone who was 65 years of age or older.

There were 11,474 families in the city.

There were 16,495 housing units, of which 3.9% were vacant. The homeowner vacancy rate was 1.0% and the rental vacancy rate was 5.3%.

Racial composition as of the 2020 census
Race	Number	Percent
White	20,423	43.2%
Black or African American	11,142	23.6%
American Indian and Alaska Native	259	0.5%
Asian	3,084	6.5%
Native Hawaiian and Other Pacific Islander	52	0.1%
Some other race	5,451	11.5%
Two or more races	6,884	14.6%
Hispanic or Latino (of any race)	11,962	25.3%

=== 2010 census ===
As of the 2010 United States census, 35,579 people, 11,586 households, and 9,178 families resided in the city.

=== 2000 census ===
As of the 2000 census, 24,391 people, 8,072 households, and 6,554 families were living in the city. The population density was 1,843.1 inhabitants per square mile (711.6/km^{2}). The 8,405 housing units had an average density of 635.1 per square mile (245.2/km^{2}). The racial makeup of the city was 81.47% White, 6.59% African American, 0.35% Native American, 2.93% Asian, 0.06% Pacific Islander, 6.22% from other races, and 2.38% from two or more races. Hispanics or Latinos of any race were 15.20% of the population.

Of the 8,072 households, 44.9% had children under 18 living with them, 65.9% were married couples living together, 10.7% had a female householder with no husband present, and 18.8% were not families. About 13.2% of all households were made up of individuals, and 3.8% had someone living alone who was 65 or older. The average household size was 2.99 and the average family size was 3.28.

In 2000, in the city, the age distribution was 29.2% under 18, 8.0% from 18 to 24, 36.2% from 25 to 44, 19.3% from 45 to 64, and 7.3% who were 65 or older. The median age was 33 years. For every 100 females, there were 97.4 males. For every 100 females 18 and over, there were 94.3 males.

In 2000, the median income for a household in the city was $53,225 and for a family was $56,865. Males had a median income of $33,628 versus $26,519 for females. The per capita income for the city was $20,896. About 4.2% of families and 5.6% of the population were below the poverty line, including 6.6% of those under 18 and 8.1% of those 65 or over.

== Transportation ==
Ocoee was served by the Atlantic Coast Line Railroad. The Ocoee station burned in a fire of undetermined origin on December 4, 1928. The Tavares and Gulf Railroad's terminus was in Ocoee. Its former station still stands and is the home of the Ocoee Lions Club.

== Education ==
Residents are zoned to Orange County Public Schools.

High schools serving sections of Ocoee include Ocoee High School, West Orange High School. and Olympia High School.

== Notable people ==
- Brian Barber, former Major League Baseball player for the Philadelphia Phillies
- Bart Bryant, professional golfer
- Aubrey Perry, soccer player
- Grant Riller, professional basketball player
- Caleb Gordon, a rap/hip-hop musician

== See also ==
- List of sundown towns in the United States
- Ocoee Christian Church
