= Gaylord Schanilec =

American wood engraver

Gaylord Schanilec (born 15 April 1955) is an American wood engraver, printer, designer, poet, and illustrator. He is the proprietor of the press Midnight Paper Sales, located in Stockholm, Wisconsin. He has used the traditional wood engraving process to create illustrations for hundreds of works.

== Early life and career ==
Schanilec grew up in the Red River Valley of North Dakota. He earned a BA from the University of North Dakota. Influenced by the spirit of place poetry movement of the Great Plains, and by the work of poet Thomas McGrath in particular, his early career was spent in the Twin Cities of Minnesota illustrating books of small press poetry. In 1981 he began printing books and established his own imprint, Midnight Paper Sales. The name of his press came from when he and other artists would salvage paper from a nearby paper company's trash bins. In 2023, in an interview for the release of his latest book with Patricia Hampl, he said, "I don’t like the term ‘artist books’ very much but I don’t know what to call myself. I guess a ‘bookie.’ ”

== Awards and honors ==
- 2021 McKnight Printmaking Fellow
- 2020 Minnesota Book Artist Award for My Mighty Journey: A Waterfall's Story
- 2006 Carl Hertzog Book Design Award for Mayflies of the Driftless Region
- American Institute of Graphic Arts Award of Excellence for High Bridge

== Works ==
=== Books Printed ===
- _{On Returning, Gaylord Schanilec, Midnight Paper Sales, (St. Paul, MN) 1981.}
- _{One Angel Then, Deborah Keenan, Midnight Paper Sales, (St. Paul, MN) 1981.}
- _{Euphemism of a Catholic Childhood, Gaylord Schanilec, Midnight Paper Sales, (St. Paul, MN), 1981.}
- _{Midnight Paper Sales, Gaylord Schanilec, Midnight Paper Sales, (St. Paul, MN), 1981.}
- _{Poems from Last Summer, Robert Scott, Midnight Paper Sales, (St. Paul, MN), 1982.}
- _{Buffaloed, Gaylord Schanilec, Midnight Paper Sales, (St. Paul, MN), 1983.}
- _{High Bridge, Midnight Paper Sales, (St. Paul, MN), 1987.}
- _{Farmers, Midnight Paper Sales, (St. Paul, MN), 1989.}
- _{The Tender Organizations, Carol Bly, Minnesota Center for Book Arts, (Minneapolis, MN), 1989.}
- _{Winter Prairie Woman, Meridel Le Sueur, Minnesota Center for Book Arts, (Minneapolis, MN), 1990.}
- _{The Old Bird, J. F. Powers, Minnesota Center for Book Arts, (Minneapolis, MN), 1991.}
- _{The Bread of This World, Thomas McGrath, Midnight Paper Sales, (Minneapolis, MN), 1992.}
- _{Snares, Will Weaver, Minnesota Center for Book Arts, (Minneapolis, MN), 1992.}
- _{A House in the Country, Mary Logue, Midnight Paper Sales, (Stockholm, WI), 1995.}
- _{Excerpts from a Wisconsin Childhood, Suzanne McNear, Midnight Paper Sales, (Stockholm, WI), 1997.}
- _{Bad Beat, Pete Hautman, Midnight Paper Sales, (Stockholm, WI), 1998.}
- _{Waterfalls of the Mississippi, Richard Arey, Minnesota Outdoors Press, (St. Paul, MN), 1998.}
- _{YTWOK, Midnight Paper Sales, (Stockholm, WI), 1999.}
- _{I Will Eat a Piece of the Roof & You Can Eat the Window, John Dufresne, Midnight Paper Sales, (Stockholm, WI), 1999.}
- _{Emerson G. Wulling: Printer for Pleasure, Midnight Paper Sales, (Stockholm, WI), 2000.}
- _{Daffodils in February, Sharon Rose Stumpf, self-published, 2001.}
- _{Earnest Morgan: Printer of Principle, Midnight Paper Sales, (Stockholm, WI), 2001.}
- _{The Coriolus Effect, Edwidge Danticat, Midnight Paper Sales, (Stockholm, WI), 2002.}
- _{New York Revisited, Kenneth Auchincloss, The Grolier Club, (New York, NY), 2002.}
- _{Ink on the Elbow, Gaylord Schanilec and David Esslemont, Midnight Paper Sales & Solmentes Press, (Stockholm WI and Newtown, Wales), 2003.}
- _{The Intruder, Clayton Schanilec, Midnight Paper Sales, (Stockholm WI), 2004.}
- _{Mayflies of the Driftless Region, Clarke Garry, Midnight Paper Sales, (Stockholm, WI), 2005.}
- _{On Book Collecting, Arne Kjelsberg, The Ampersand Club, (Minneapolis, MN), 2005.}
- _{Turkish Pears in August, Robert Bly, Midnight Paper Sales, (Stockholm, WI), 2005.}
- _{Old Swayback, Jim Heynen, Midnight Paper Sales, (Stockholm, WI), 2006.}
- _{Sylvæ, Benjamin Verhoeven and Gaylord Schanilec, Midnight Paper Sales, (Stockholm, WI), 2007.}
- _{Plunging, Edwidge Danticat, Midnight Paper Sales, (Stockholm, WI), 2009.}
- _{Report from Pool Four, Gaylord Schanilec, Midnight Paper Sales, (Stockholm, WI), 2010.}
- _{The Bicycle Diaries, Richard Goodaman, Midnight Paper Sales, (Stockholm, WI), 2011.}
- _{Lac Des Pleurs, Midnight Paper Sales, (Stockholm, WI), 2015.}
- _{A Little Book of Birds, Gaylord Schanilec, Midnight Paper Sales, (Stockholm, WI), 2017.}
- _{My Mighty Journey, John Coy, Midnight Paper Sales, (St. Paul, MN), 2019.}
- _{Bokeh: A Little Book of Flowers, Gaylord Schanilec, Midnight Paper Sales, (St. Paul, MN), 2020.}
- _{American Crow: Report from Quarantine, Gaylord Schanilec, Midnight Paper Sales, (Stockholm, WI), 2021.}
- It's Come to This. Patricia Hampl. Midnight Paper Sales, 2023.

=== Books Illustrated ===
- _{Strips and Shavings, David Martinson, Truck Press, (St. Paul, MN), 1978.}
- _{Lunch in Fur, Anselm Hollo, Truck Press, (St. Paul, MN), 1978.}
- _{Where is Dancer’s Hill?, Robert Schueler, Lame Johnny Press, (Menomonie, WI), 1979.}
- _{An Explosion of White Pedals, Compas/Writers in the Schools, (St. Paul, MN), 1979.}
- _{A Box of Night Mirrors, COMPAS/Writers in the Schools, (St. Paul, MN), 1980.}
- _{Weathers, Houses, Vistas, Dust, Joseph Hutchinson, Juniper Press, (La Crosse, WI), 1980.}
- _{Unease, Tadeusz Rozewicz, New Rivers Press, (St. Paul, MN), 1980.}
- _{How Micky Made It, Jayne Ann Phillips, Bookslinger Editions, (St. Paul, MN), 1981.}
- _{Household Wounds, Deborah Keenan, New Rivers Press, (St. Paul, MN), 1981.}
- _{The Zelinski Poems, Thomas Reiter, Juniper Press, (La Crosse, WI), 1981.}
- _{Deposition, Pete Green, New Rivers Press, (St. Paul, MN), 1982.}
- _{Different Arrangements, Sharon Chmeilarz, New Rivers Press, (St. Paul, MN), 1982.}
- _{Lessons from a Fourth Grade Class, Mary Molyneux, Toothpaste Press, (West Branch, IA), 1982.}
- _{Total Strangers, Terence Winch, Toothpaste Press, (West Branch, IA), 1982.}
- _{Resort, Patricia Hampl, Bookslinger Editions, (St. Paul, MN), 1982.}
- _{Somata, Philip Foss Jr., Beiler Press, (Minneapolis, MN), 1982.}
- _{Morning Windows, Michael Moos, New Rivers Press, (St. Paul, MN), 1983.}
- _{Constellations, Roger Blakely, self-published, (St. Paul, MN), 1983.}
- _{The Man in the Cardboard Mask, Alvin Greenberg, Coffe House Press, (Minneapolis, MN), 1984.}
- _{Harum Scarum, Keith Abbot, Coffee House Press, (Minneapolis, MN), 1984.}
- _{Your Are Mine, Patricia Shaheen, self-published, (Minneapolis, MN), 1984.}
- _{Erosion Surface, Steven LaVoie, Coffee House Press, (Minneapolis, MN), 1984.}
- _{Offcuts, Campbell-Logan Bindery, (Minneapolis, MN), 1985.}
- _{The Alligator Report, W. P. Kinsella, Coffee House Press, (Minneapolis, MN), 1985.}
- _{My Father’s Life, Raymond Carver, Babcock and Koonz, (Ridgewood, NJ), 1986.}
- _{Lucha, Constance Urdang, Coffee House Press, (Minneapolis, MN), 1986.}
- _{Dance Me Outside, W. P. Kinsella, David R. Godine Publisher, (Boston, MA), 1986.}
- _{Bop, Maxine Chernoff, Coffee House Press, (Minneapolis, MN), 1986.}
- _{Twelve Below Zero, Anthony Bukowski, New Rivers Press, (St. Paul, MN), 1986.}
- _{Common Body, Royal Bones, Evelyn Schefner, Coffee House Press, (Minneapolis, MN), 1987.}
- _{More Stately Mansions, John Updike, Nouveau Press, 1987.}
- _{Keeping the Star, Thomas R. Smith, New Rivers Press, (St. Paul, MN), 1987.}
- _{The First Thing Coming, Keith Abbot, Coffee House Press, (Minneapolis, MN), 1987.}
- _{Communist, Richard Ford, Babcock and Koontz, (Ridgewood, NJ), 1988.}
- _{American Earthquakes, Constance Urdang, Coffee House Press, (Minneapolis, MN), 1988.}
- _{The Play and Other Stories, Stephen Dixon, Coffee House Press, (Minneapolis, MN), 1988.}
- _{Cover Me, Lon Otto, Coffee House Press, (Minneapolis, MN), 1988.}
- _{No Relation to the Hotel, David Hilton, Coffee House Press, (Minneapolis, MN), 1989.}
- _{Chanticleer of the Wilderness, Meridel Le Seur, Holy Cow Press, (Duluth, MN), 1989.}
- _{Love, John Williams, Babcock and Koontz, (Ridgewood, NJ), 1989.}
- _{Eight Decades, Elmer Anderson, self-published, 1989.}
- _{My Own Alphabet, Bobbie Louise Hawkins, Coffee House Press, (Minneapolis, MN), 1989.}
- _{Why We Live With Animals, Alvin Greenburg, Coffee House Press, (Minneapolis, MN), 1990.}
- _{The Other Miller, Tobias Wolff, Babcock and Koontz, (Ridgewood, NJ), 1990.}
- _{Dismal River, Ron Block, New Rivers Press, (St. Paul, MN), 1991.}
- _{The First and Last Old-timers Baseball Game, W. P. Kinsella, Coffee House Press, (Minneapolis, MN), 1991.}
- _{Wrenching Times, Walt Whitman, Gwasg Gregynog, (Newtown, Wales), 1991.}
- _{A Printer’s Dozen, Philip Gallo, Beiler Press, (Minneapolis, MN), 1992.}
- _{Five Short Stories, Marcel Ayme, Bird and Bull Press, (Newtown, PA), 1994.}
- _{A .38 Special and a Broken Heart, Jonis Agee, Coffee House Press, (Minneapolis, MN), 1995.}
- _{My Town, David Lee, Copper Canyon Press, (Port Townsend, WA), 1995.}
- _{On The Rocks, MFK Fisher, The Ampersand Club, (Minneapolis, MN), 1997.}
- _{Letter to an Imaginary Friend, Thomas McGrath, Copper Canyon Press, (Port Townsend, WA), 1997.}
- _{The Return of the Private, Hamlin Garland, Yellow Barn Press, (Omaha, NE), 1998.}
- _{Short Essays, Et al., The Hill Press, (Baltimore, MD), 1998.}
- _{On the Rocks, J. J. Talaga, The Ampersand Club, (Minneapolis, MN), 1999.}
- _{Keepsakes and Other Stories, Jon Hassler, Afton Historical Society Press, (Afton, MN), 1999.}
- _{Rufus at the Door and Other Stories, Joh Hassler, Afton Historical Society Press, (Afton, MN), 2000.}
- _{The Boys House, Jim Heynen, Minnesota Historical Press, 2001.}
- _{The Mystery of the Jeweled Cross, Larry Millett, Minnesota Center for Book Arts, (Minneapolis, MN), 2002.}
- _{A Walk by the River, Dale Jacobson, Red Dragonfly Press, (Northfeild, MN), 2004.}
- _{Fine Printing in the Twentieth Century, Selections from the Collection of Kenneth Auchincloss, The Grolier Club, (New York, NY), 2005.}
- _{Twenty-four Old Regulars, Maurice Manning, Press on Scroll Road, (Cleveland Heights, OH), 2008.}
- _{My Mighty Journey, John Coy, Minnesota Historical Society Press, (St. Paul, MN), 2019.}
