= Duiske Abbey =

- Graiguenamanagh Abbey
- Mainistir an Dubhuisce
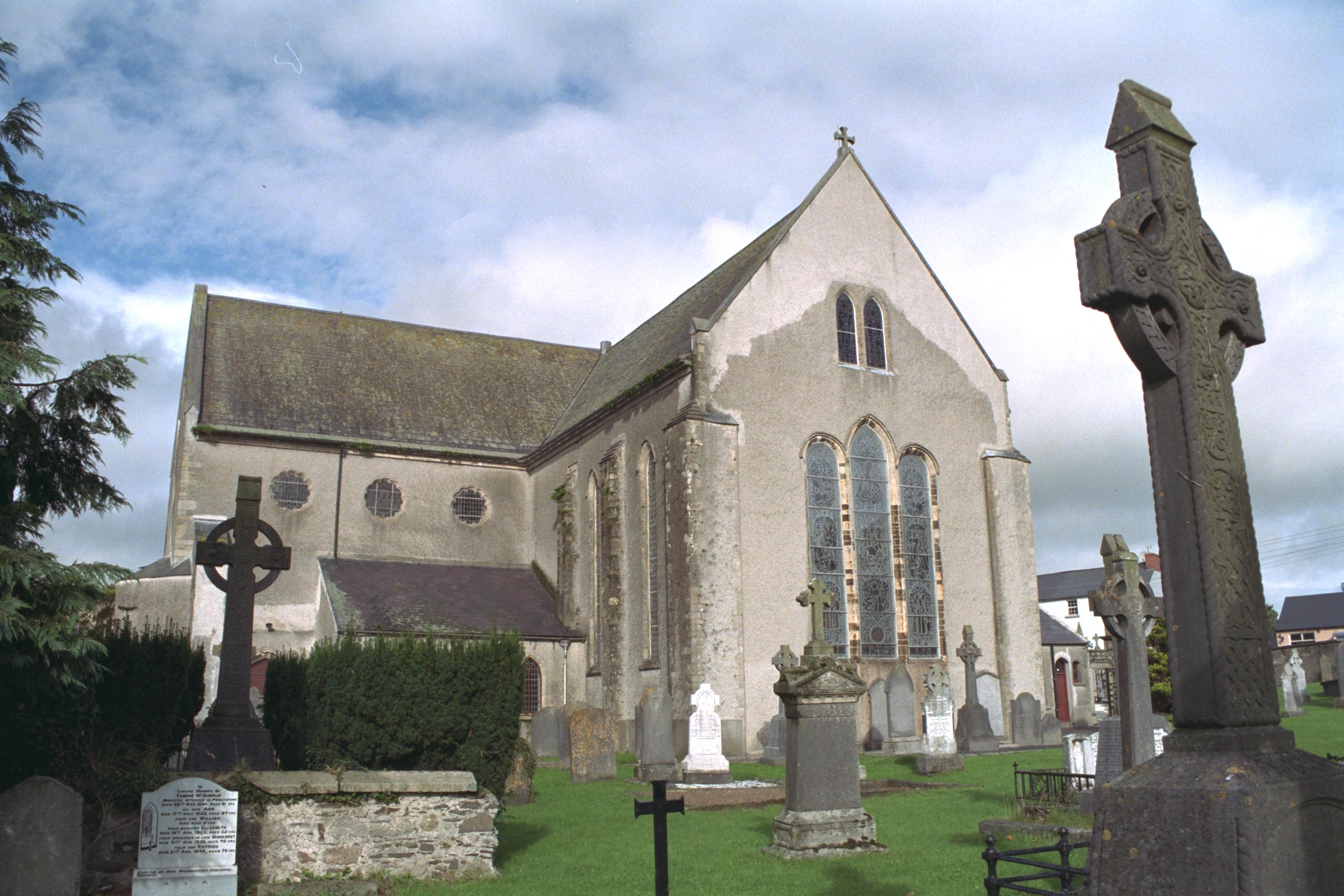
- Choir window as seen from South East

- Location within Ireland
- 52°32′28.15″N 6°57′16.79″W
- Location: Abbey Street, Graiguenamanagh, County Kilkenny, Ireland
- Denomination: Roman Catholic
- Religious institute: Cistercians
- Website: Graignamanagh Parish

History
- Status: Active as parochial church
- Founded: 1204
- Founder: William Marshal, 1st Earl of Pembroke

Architecture
- Style: English Gothic, gothic, romanesque

Administration
- Diocese: Roman Catholic Diocese of Kildare and Leighlin

National monument of Ireland
- Official name: Duiske Abbey
- Reference no.: 620

Duiske Abbey National Monument, also known as Graiguenamanagh Abbey, is a 13th-century Cistercian monastery situated in Graiguenamanagh, County Kilkenny in Ireland.

Duiske Abbey was founded by William Marshal in 1207 and is one of the first, largest and perhaps the finest of the thirty-four medieval Cistercian monasteries in Ireland. The Abbey is the parish church of Graiguenamanagh town and beautifully dominates the town centre.

The Abbey is located in the valley of the river Barrow, on a site between the main river and the Duiske tributary. The abbey derives its name from the Douskey River Irish: An Dubhuisce, meaning 'Black Water'.

== History ==
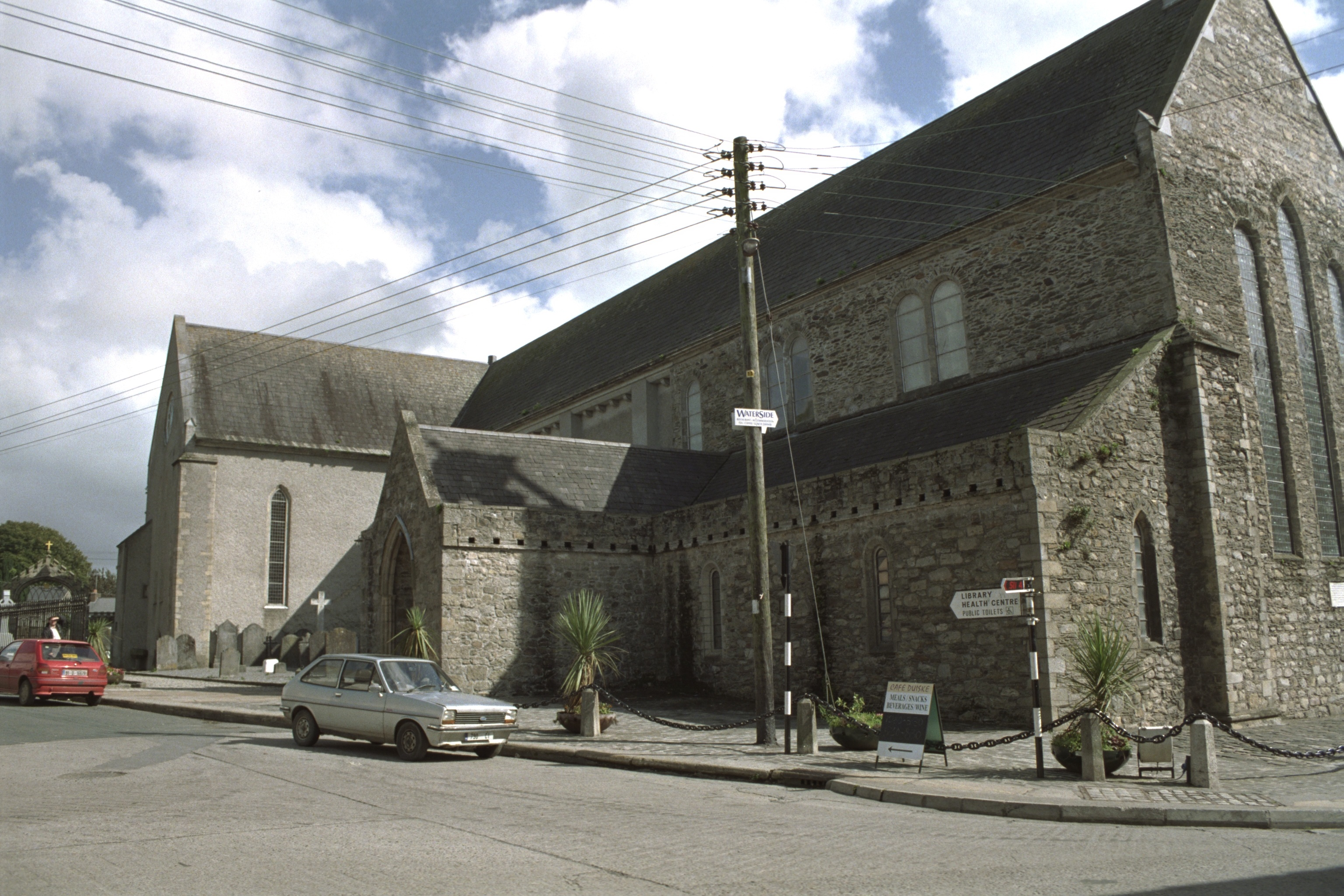
Duiske Abbey as seen Abbey Street

The Abbey was founded in 1204 by William Marshall the elder, earl of Pembroke, and was colonised with monks from Stanley in Wiltshire. The monks may not have arrived at Graiguenamangh until 1207, but it seems that building may have begun in 1204 when the cemetery at Duiske was consecrated. Prior to their relocation to Graiguenamanagh, the monks initially established a settlement at Annamult near Bennettsbridge, constructing a castle and round tower, the ruins of which are still visible.

In 1228 the religious community was fixed at thirty-six monks and fifty lay-brothers which was almost as large as Mellifont Abbey. The abbot of Duiske sat as a peer in parliament at that time.

The Abbey was suppressed under Henry VIII in 1536 and the last abbot, Charles O'Cavanagh, resigned his title. Monks continued to occupy it but it began to fall into ruin. Following the dissolution the lands were awarded to James Butler of Duiske. The abbey church continued to be used as a local place of worship. The Church of Ireland re-roofed the west end after the tower collapsed into the nave in 1744. The church was returned to the Roman Catholic community in 1812 and restoration was completed in the 1980s. Currently it is used as a parish church and music events are held there.

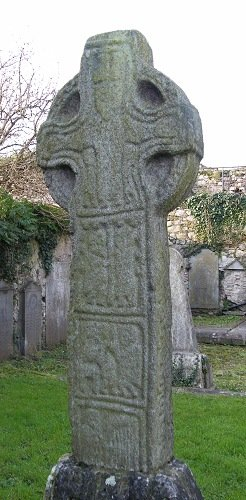
Ballyogan High Cross

== Building ==
Duiske Abbey was one of the first, largest and perhaps the finest of the thirty-four medieval Cistercian monasteries in Ireland. Much of the abbey was constructed with yellow limestone brought across the Irish Sea from quarries at Dundry, outside Bristol.

Significant remains of the monastery still exist and the remains were fully restored in the 1970s by the Irish Inspector of National Monuments Percy Le Clerc as an early Cistercian Church. Original medieval floor tiles from the original building can be seen in the abbey along with the beautiful "Early English" gothic and romanesque architecture. Some of the 13th-century stonework can still be seen, including still-leaf foliage carved into the capitals, dog-tooth ornaments and banded shafts. It contains many Lancet windows.

An effigy of a 13th-century Norman Knight found in the ruins is installed by the main entrance. He is depicted seizing a sword and is carved with great attention to detail. It is one of the finest medieval effigies in Ireland. In its northern aisle a model of the monastery shows the abbey as it was in the 14th century. Explanation plaques are at various points in the Abbey. In the nearby Abbey Centre there is an exhibition of contemporary Christian Art and local historic artefacts.

Within the graveyard are two high crosses - Ballyogan cross and the shorter Aghailta cross.

== See also ==
- Graiguenamanagh
- Annals of Duiske
- List of abbeys and priories in Ireland (County Kilkenny)
- List of National Monuments in County Kilkenny
