= Patricia Hampl =

American memoirist, writer, lecturer, and educator

Patricia Hampl (born March 12, 1946) is an American memoirist, writer, lecturer, and educator. She taught in the MFA program at the University of Minnesota at Minneapolis and is one of the founding members of the Loft Literary Center.

== Life ==
Patricia Hampl was born in St. Paul, Minnesota, to Stanislaus (Stan) and Mary Hampl. She attended the University of Minnesota, where she earned her Bachelor of Arts in 1968. Hampl earned her Master of Fine Arts at the University of Iowa in 1970.

Hampl worked as an editor of Minnesota Monthly from 1973 to 1975 and as a freelance writer and editor from 1975 to 1979. Between 1979 and 1996, she was a visiting assistant professor, associate professor, and professor of English at the University of Minnesota, Minneapolis, where she is now the Regents Professor and McKnight Distinguished Professor and teaches fall semesters in the English department's MFA program. Hampl has taught courses such as Heroic Poetics, History in a Personal Voice, Reading Across Genres, Contemporary American Poets, Introduction to Creative Writing and Introduction to Fiction Writing.

Hampl has also taught at Ball State University, Beloit College, and West Virginia University, and in 1995 and 1996 at the Bread Loaf Writers' Conference. She is a contributing editor at The Alaska Quarterly Review. In 2015, Hampl was an adjunct faculty member in the writing program at the Columbia University School of the Arts. Since 2005, she has been a member of the permanent faculty of the Prague Summer Program, hosted by Prague's Charles University and Western Michigan University. She is also affiliated with Kingston University-London as visiting professor in the Centre for Life Narratives. She was the first woman writer tenured in Creative Writing at the University of Minnesota.

== Writing career ==
Hampl is best known for her memoirs. Her first memoir, A Romantic Education, dealt with her Czech heritage and won Hampl the Houghton Mifflin Literary Fellowship in 1981. Virgin Time: In Search of the Contemplative Life, another memoir, dealt with her Roman Catholic upbringing. Her short story "The Bill Collector's Vacation" won a 1999 Pushcart Prize.

Hampl won critical acclaim for her 2007 memoir The Florist's Daughter, about her mother's death. The New York Times Book Review wrote, "Hampl's honest examination of her own life makes The Florist's Daughter a wonder of a memoir." It won the 2008 Minnesota Book Award for Memoir & Creative Nonfiction.

Hampl is also the author of several poetry anthologies.

== Awards ==
(Note: This is a list of selected awards. For a complete list of Hampl's awards, see the External Links section below)

- Guggenheim Foundation Fellowship (1976)
- National Endowment for the Arts Grant (1976)
- Bush Foundation Fellowship (1979)
- Houghton Mifflin Literary Fellowship (1981)
- MacArthur Fellow (1990)
- Fulbright Fellowship (1995)
- McKnight Distinguished University Professorship (1996)
- Pushcart Prize (1999)
- Distinguished Achievement Award, Western Literature Association (2001)

== Selected bibliography ==
- Woman Before an Aquarium (1978)
- A Romantic Education (1981)
- Resort and Other Poems (1983)
- Spillville (With Steven Sorman) (1987)
- Virgin Time: In Search of the Contemplative Life (1992)
- Burning Bright, anthology of sacred poetry (Judaism, Christianity, Islam). Ed. Patricia Hampl. (1995)
- Memory and Imagination (1999)
- I Could Tell You Stories: Sojourns in the Land of Memory (1999)
- The St. Paul Stories of F. Scott Fitzgerald. Co-ed. Patricia Hampl. Introduction by Patricia Hampl. (2004)
- Blue Arabesque: A Search for the Sublime (2006)
- The Florist's Daughter: A Memoir (2007)
- The Art of the Wasted Day (2018)
- It's Come to This (2023). Published by Gaylord Schanilec.
