= Ocoee Christian Church (Ocoee, Florida) =

Historic church in Florida, United States

- U.S. National Register of Historic Places
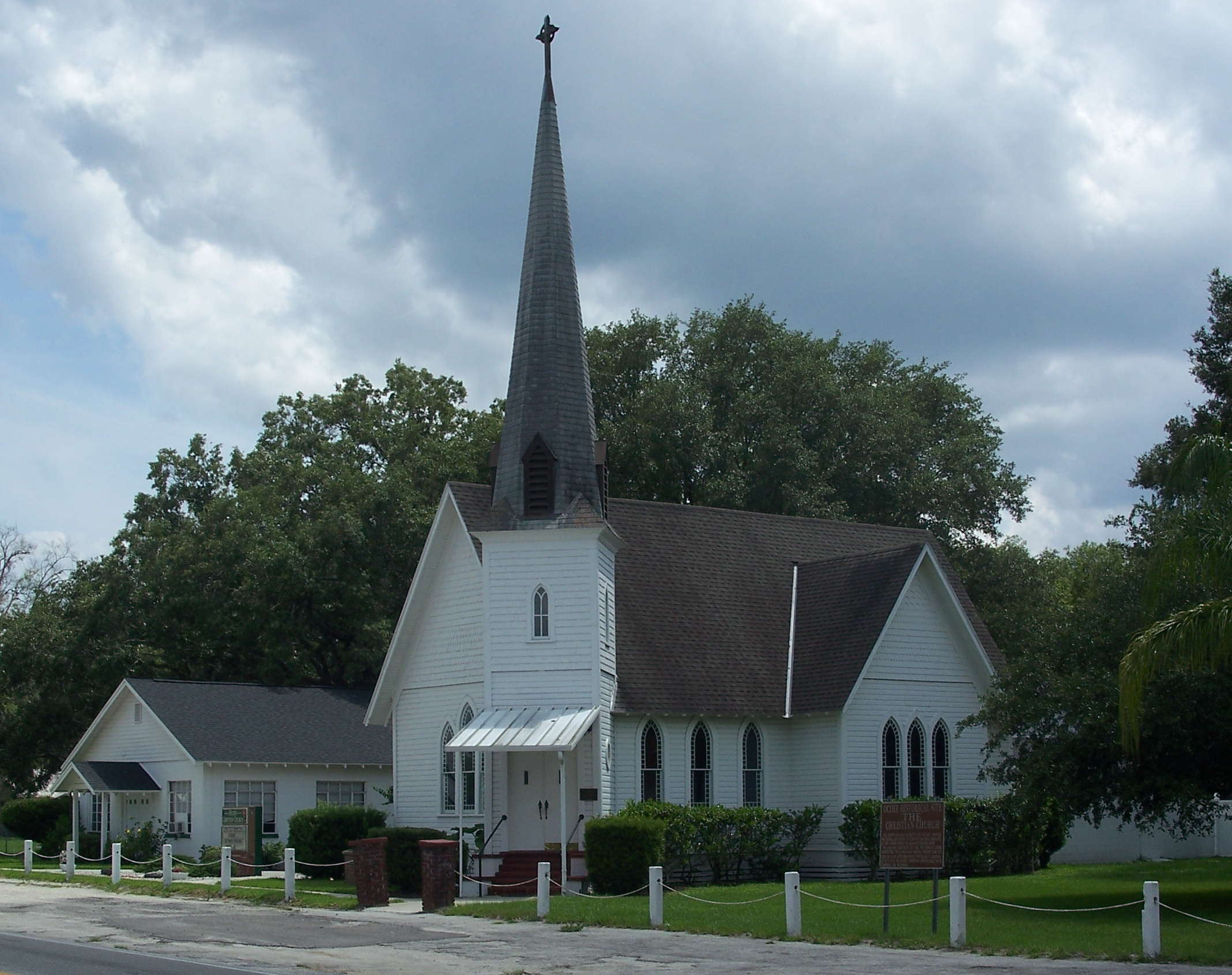

- Location within Florida Location within the United States
- Location: 15 South Bluford Avenue; Ocoee, Florida
- Coordinates: 28°34′7″N 81°32′40″W
- Built: 1891
- Architectural style: Carpenter Gothic
- NRHP reference No.: 97000277
- Added to NRHP: March 28, 1997

The Ocoee Christian Church is a historic Carpenter Gothic church in Ocoee, Florida. It is located at 15 South Bluford Avenue. On March 28, 1997, it was added to the U.S. National Register of Historic Places.

The church is affiliated with the Christian Church (Disciples of Christ) and is believed to be the oldest church building of that denomination in continuous use in Florida. There are older Christian Churches (i.e First Christian of Lake Butler established in 1876, located in North Central Florida that is a part of the original restoration movement Christian Church that while a continuous congregation is no longer in the original log cabin building).

== History ==
In 1883, the Ocoee Christian Church began in the home of General and Mrs. William Temple Withers. The couple made plans in 1889 to construct a church building on land donated by Captain and Mrs. Bluford Sims. Though General Withers died that same year before construction could commence, his widow and children continued with the construction of the church. By 1891 the congregation began to hold worship services in the newly constructed church.

== Architecture ==
The Gothic sanctuary, designed by an architect in Boston, was designed with a similar, reduced scale floor plans as European Gothic cathedrals. The stained-glass chancel windows, dedicated to the memory of William T. Withers, were designed and assembled in Belgium. The windows traveled from Belgium to Jacksonville via New York. The windows traveled from Jacksonville to Sanford via the St. Johns River and finally by oxcart to Ocoee. The church's bell was cast in 1891 by the Shane Bell Foundry in Baltimore, Maryland.
