= Keenan =

Surname of Irish origin

Keenan is an Irish surname meaning 'ancient, distant' in the Irish language. It is derived from Ó Cianáin 'descendant of Cianán' (a diminutive of Cian). The Ó Cianáin clan were hereditary historians to the Mac Uidhir.

== People named Keenan ==
=== First name ===
- Keenan Allen, American football wide receiver
- Keenan Cornelius, American jiu-jitsu practitioner
- Keenan Clayton, American football linebacker
- Keenan Evans (born 1996), American basketball player
- Keenan Garber (born 2000), American football player
- Keenan Hollahan, pseudonym for advice columnist
- Keenan Johnson, Bahamian politician
- Keenan McCardell, former American football wide receiver
- Keenan O'Mailia, American murder victim
- Keenan Robinson, American football linebacker
- Kenan Thompson, American actor and comedian
- Keenen Ivory Wayans, American comedian, director and writer
- Keenan Wynn, American character actor

=== Last name ===
- Brian Keenan (Irish republican), Provisional IRA member
- Brian Keenan (musician born 1943), American musician
- Brian Keenan (writer), Irish journalist and hostage
- Brigid Keenan, British/Irish writer of best-selling memoirs "Diplomatic Baggage"
- Cathy Keenan, Canadian television actor
- Celia Keenan-Bolger, American stage actor and singer
- David Keenan, Scottish writer and musician
- Deborah Keenan, American poet and educator
- Don Keenan, Canadian ice hockey goaltender
- Donal Keenan, Irish Gaelic games administrator
- Edward L. Keenan, American historian of medieval Russia
- Emma Keenan, Canadian ice hockey player
- Frank Keenan, American stage and screen actor and director
- Frank Keenan (hurler) Irish hurling player
- Harold Keenan, English footballer
- Harry Keenan, American screen actor
- Helen Grace Scott Keenan, American journalist, OSS employee and Soviet spy
- Henry Francis Keenan, American journalist and author
- Jack Keenan (boxer) (1929–2009), Canadian boxer
- Joe Keenan (footballer), British footballer
- Joe Keenan (writer), American writer and playwright
- John Keenan (Medal of Honor), U.S. Army soldier
- John F. Keenan, American attorney and federal judge
- John R. Keennan (1940–2015), American baseball scout
- Joseph B. Keenan, chief prosecutor in the International Military Tribunal for the Far East
- Joseph Henry Keenan, American thermodynamicist
- Lillie Keenan (born 1996), American show jumping rider
- Luke A. Keenan (1872–1924), New York politician
- Maynard James Keenan, American singer of bands Tool, A Perfect Circle and Puscifer
- Michael Keenan (politician), Australian Minister of Justice
- Mike Keenan, Canadian ice hockey manager
- Nancy Keenan, American politician and pro-choice campaigner
- Nicolás Keenan, Argentine field hockey player
- Norbert Keenan, Australian politician
- Paddy Keenan, Irish uilleann piper
- Pepper Keenan, American musician with Corrosion of Conformity
- Perry Keenan, American politician
- Peter Keenan ("Crackers" Keenan), former Australian rules footballer
- Peter Keenan (boxer), Scottish boxer of the 1940s, and 1950s
- Philip Childs Keenan (1908–2000), American astronomer
- Phuwaryne Keenan (born 1988), Thai singer
- Roy Keenan (1930–2003), Canadian boxer
- Sinead Keenan, Irish actress
- Shy Keenan, British author, child sexual abuse survivor, and founder of Phoenix Survivors
- Sterling James Keenan, American pro wrestler
- Tamra Keenan, British singer
- Terry Keenan, American broadcast television business correspondent
- Tim Keenan III (born 2002), American football player
- Trish Keenan, English singer and composer
- Vernon Keenan, American law enforcement officer

Fictional

- Gareth Keenan, character from UK television series The Office
