= Phuwaryne Keenan =

Thai singer

- ภูวรินทร์ คีแนน
- Born: Matanawee Keenan; October 27, 1988 (age 37); Phuket, Thailand
- Other name: Zee
- Occupations: Singer; Model; Actor
- Musical career
- Genres: Pop; Pop rock

Phuwaryne Keenan (Thai: ภูวรินทร์ คีแนน; RTGS: Phuwarin Khinaen); born 27 October 1988), or nicknamed Zee (Thai: ซี), is a Thai actor, singer and model. He became a media figure after singing "Ngai Ngai Tae Ngao" (Simply but Lonely).

== Career ==
Zee has been a model in Thai magazines, such as "TomAct" and "I Like". He has many music videos, such as "Ter Kei Rak Chun Jing Jing Rue Pao" (Have You Ever Really Loved Me?). He is affiliated with RS (Rose Sound). In addition, he has been in Auntie Anne's and Eversense advertising. Also, he is a presenter of Secant Brand which is a clothing brand for Thai tomboys.

== Personal life ==
Zee is a trans man.

== Music works ==
Album details	List of songs
Love Zeeries Party Concert: Release: 2011; Copyright: RS	1. ง่ายๆแต่เหงา / Ngai Ngai Dtae Ngao (Translation: Easy But Lonely); 2. เคยรักฉันจริงๆ หรือเปล่า / Koey Ruk Chun Jing Jing Reu Plao (Translation: Did You Ever Really Love Me?); 3. ไม่รักบ้างก็แล้วไป / Mai Ruk Bahng Gor Laeo Pai (Translation: If You Don't Love Me, Then Leave) feat. Kaew of FFK; 4. เกลียดบางคนที่เธอคิดถึง / Gliet Bahng Kon Tee Tur Kit Teung (Translation: I Hate the Person Who You're Missing); 5. รักไม่เท่าเข้าใจ / Ruk Mai Tao Kao Jai (Translation: Love Doesn't Equal Understanding); 6. คนมีความรัก / Kon Mee Kwahm Ruk (Translation: A Person Has Love)
Believe: Release: 2013; Copyright: RS	1. ปรากฏการณ์รัก / Pragotgahn Ruk (Translation: The Phenomenon of Love); 2. ให้ฉันกอดเธอได้ไหม / Hai Chun Gaut Tur Dai Mai (Translation: Could You Let Me Hug You?); 3. ล้วง / Luang (Translation: Dig) [Eng Title: Deeply]
