= Leabhar Adhamh Ó Cianáin =

Leabhar Adhamh Ó Cianáin or The Book of Adhamh Ó Cianáin, now G 2-3 NLI (National Library of Ireland), is a book written in or about the 1340s by Adhamh Ó Cianáin by and for himself, and out of the book of his teacher, Seán Mór Ó Dubhagáin.

Kenneth Nicholls has suggested that Adhamh wrote the book's genealogies between 1328 and 1350, which occur in the first half of the manuscript, which also contains the metrical Banshenchas. It is also important as the earliest surviving post-Norman Gaelic genealogy, which Ó Cianáin - as he implies himself - probably derived from Ó Dubhagáin's book.

Unusually for a late medieval Irish manuscript, it is illustrated, including human portraits. It is believed to have been part of a movement to revivify Irish culture by antiquarism.

== Sources ==
- The Learned Family of Ó Cianáin/Keenan, by Nollaig Ó Muraíle, in Clougher Record, pp. 396–402, 2005.
