= Deborah Keenan =

American poet (born 1950)

- Born: 1950 (age 75–76); Minneapolis
- Occupation: Poet

Deborah Keenan (born 1950, in Minneapolis) is an American poet.

== Life ==
She is an editor for Milkweed Editions. She also teaches at Hamline University. She lives with her husband, Stephen Seidel, who is the director of urban programs for Habitat for Humanity. They have four children.

== Awards ==
- Bush Foundation Fellowships for her poetry
- National Endowment for the Arts Fellowship
- The Loft McKnight Poet of Distinction award
- 2006-2007 Edelstein Keller Minnesota author of Distinction at the University of Minnesota
- 1991 American Book Award

== Works ==
- One Angel Then, Midnight Paper Sales Press, 1981
- Household Wounds, New Rivers Press, 1981, ISBN 978-0-89823-022-2
- The Only Window That Counts, New Rivers Press, 1985, ISBN 978-0-89823-069-7
- How We Missed Belgium, Milkweed Editions, 1984, ISBN 978-0-915943-02-9 (written with Jim Moore)
- Happiness: poems. Coffee House Press. 1995. ISBN 978-1-56689-033-5.
- Good heart, Milkweek Editions, 2003, ISBN 9781571314154
- Kingdoms, Laurel Poetry Collective, 2006, ISBN 978-0-9787973-1-7
- Willow Room, Green Door: New and Selected Poems, March, 2007, Milkweed Editions. ISBN 978-1-57131-426-0
- The Saint of Everything, Lynx House Press, 2023 ISBN 978-0899241890

=== Editor ===
- Looking For Home: Women Writing About Exile, editors Deborah Keenan, Roseann Lloyd, Milkweed Editions, 1990, ISBN 978-0-915943-45-6

=== Anthology ===
- Robert Hedin, ed. (2007). "The Amateur; Dialogue; None of This". Where one voice ends another begins: 150 years of Minnesota poetry. Minnesota Historical Society. ISBN 978-0-87351-584-9.
