= McGuire Island =

McGuire Island may refer to either of the following islands:

- McGuire Island (Antarctica), island in Antarctica
- McGuire Island (Oregon), island in the Columbia River in Oregon
