= Giolla na Naomh Ó Cianáin =

Giolla na Naomh Ó Cianain (died 14 August 1348) was an Abbot of Lisgoole, Ireland. He was the earliest recorded member of the Ó Cianain family of historians.

== Sources ==
- The Learned Family of Ó Cianain/Keenan, by Nollaig Ó Muraíle, in Clougher Record, pp. 387–436, 2005.
