= Vernon Keenan (law enforcement official) =

American law enforcement official

Director of the Georgia Bureau of Investigation
- In office January, 2003 – January 1, 2019
- Governor: Sonny Perdue; Nathan Deal
- Succeeded by: D. Victor Reynolds

Personal details
- Spouse: Joan Thomas Keenan
- Children: 2

Vernon M. Keenan was the director of the Georgia Bureau of Investigation (GBI), the primary investigation and law enforcement agency of the U.S. state of Georgia.

He was voted one of the top 100 most influential Georgians by Georgia Trend magazine. He is a firm supporter of the state's Open Records Act. Keenan joined the GBI in 1973 and was appointed director of the agency in January 2003 by Governor Sonny Perdue. Prior to joining the GBI, he served as a patrolman with the DeKalb County Police Department (November 1972 - June 1973).

After nearly 40 years as a GBI employee and 15 years as its director, Keenan retired from GBI on January 1, 2019.

== Private life ==
He has been married for 30 years to Joan Thomas Keenan from St. Mary's, Georgia. They live in Cherokee County and have two sons, Mack and Jackson. Vernon Keenan is an Eagle Scout..
