= Ádhamh Ó Cianáin =

Irish historian and genealogist

Ádhamh Ó Cianáin (died 1373) was an Irish historian and genealogist.

Described in his obituary as "a learned historian" and "a canon" of Lisgoole, "having secured victory of deamon and world".

A member of the Ó Cianáin learned family of Fermanagh, Ádhamh studied under Seán Mór Ó Dubhagáin; it was from the latter's book that Ádhamh wrote Leabhar Adhamh Ó Cianain ('The Book of Adhamh Ó Cianáin') according to a colophon, whilst another states "Adhamh O Cianan ro sgribh in leabhar sa do fen/Adhamh Ó Cianáin wrote this book for himself".

He and Ó Dubhagáin had the responsibility of recording the genealogies of Irish Kings of the mid-Fourteenth Century.
