= Withers-Maguire House =

Historic house in Florida, United States

- U.S. National Register of Historic Places
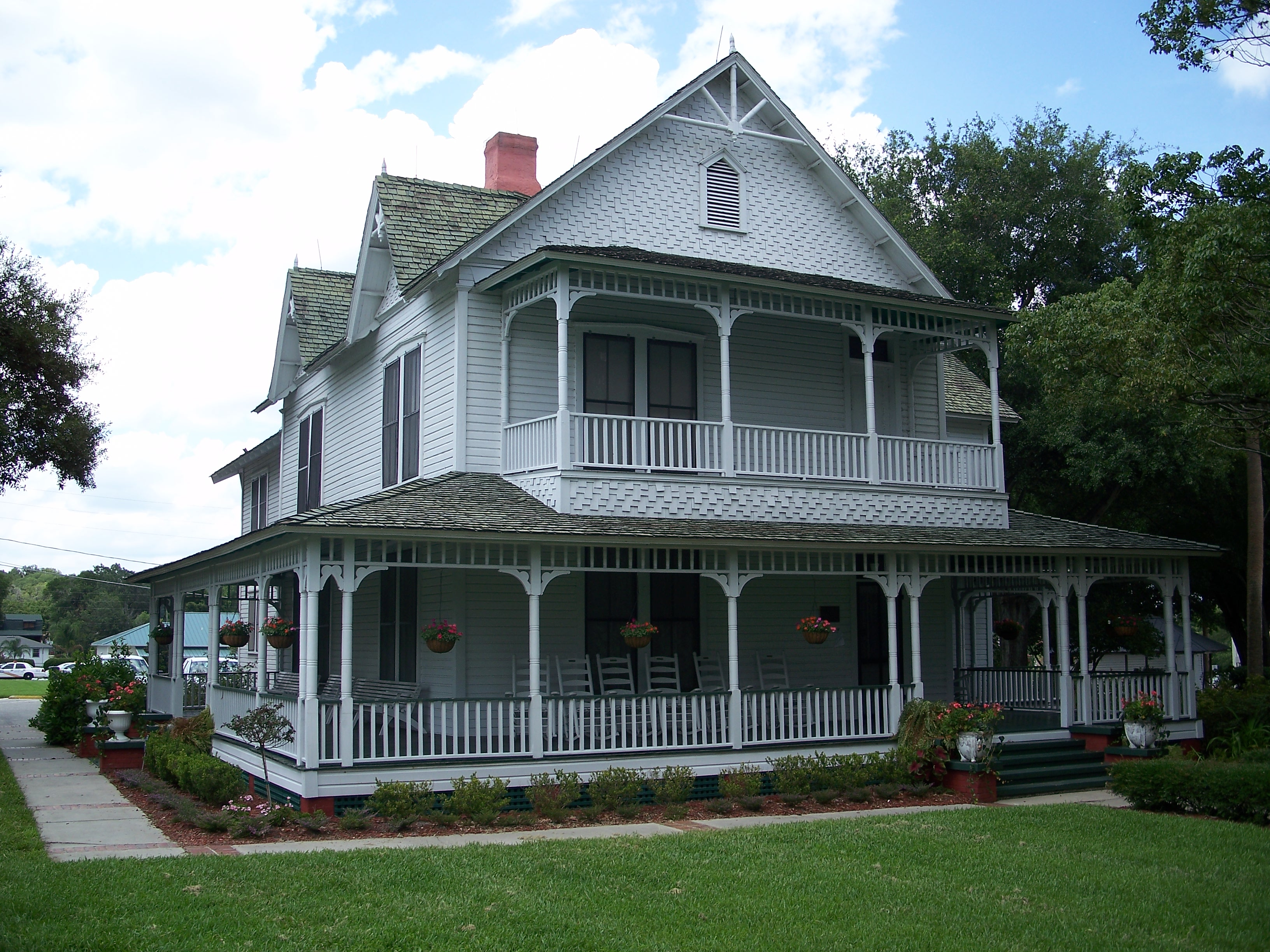

- Location within Florida Location within the United States
- Location: Ocoee, Florida
- Coordinates: 28°34′15″N 81°32′38″W
- Built: 1888
- Architectural style: Stick/Eastlake, Frame Vernacular with Stick-style elements
- NRHP reference No.: 87000579
- Added to NRHP: April 2, 1987

The Withers-Maguire House is a small event venue and historic house museum in Ocoee, Florida. It is located at 16 East Oakland Avenue and is owned by the City of Ocoee. It was added to the U.S. National Register of Historic Places on April 2, 1987.

The builder was retired General William Temple Withers, a native Kentuckian, who began wintering in Florida in 1884. He spent much of his time acquiring land in western Orange County and growing citrus. In 1888, he built this house and lived here until his death the following year. Withers’ widow, Martha, sold the house and its furnishings in 1910 to David O. Maguire and his family, whose house had recently burned. Like Withers, Maguire was very involved in citrus growing, and the family became prominent citizens in Ocoee. Maguire's son, Fred, was Ocoee's first mayor, and another son, Raymer, was the first city attorney. David Maguire died in 1913, but members of his family continued to reside in the house until 1979. After a commercial venture to convert the home to offices was abandoned, the City of Ocoee acquired the house in 1984. It was listed on the National Register of Historic Places in 1987.

Made from pine cut and milled on this site, it is an example of Stick Victorian style architecture. One of the finest houses in west Orange County, it was one of the first to have concealed electrical wiring and closets. The city restored the house following its acquisition using a combination of city funds and a State of Florida grant. The downstairs rooms is available for rental and is suitable for smaller gatherings or to support an outside event. A modern catering kitchen is available. The upstairs rooms serve as a museum depicting early 1900s life in Ocoee. Current information regarding the City of Ocoee can be found here.

== Time capsule ==
On May 13, 2025, Mayor of Ocoee Rusty Johnson and a group of commissioners and local leaders dug a time capsule on the corner of the house. It is scheduled to be opened 100 years from that date (May 13, 2125).
