= Kenneth Nicholls =

Irish academic and historian (1934–2025)

Kenneth W. Nicholls (1934 – 25 May 2025) was an Irish academic and historian, notable for his work on the late medieval and early modern period. He was the subject of a festschrift in 2014.

== Work ==
Nicholls worked at the Dublin Institute for Advanced Studies for a period during the 1960s. He was a member of staff of the history department in University College Cork until his retirement in 2004. He came to national and international prominence as the author of Gaelic and Gaelicised Ireland in the Middle Ages, first published in 1972, and reprinted in 2003. He was particularly regarded among his peers for his deep knowledge of late medieval and early modern historical sources in the Irish, Latin, French and English languages.

Nicholls' areas of professional interests included:

- Late medieval and early modern Ireland, including topics such as genealogy, population studies, place-names, marriage, law, institutions
- Scottish history, particularly legal and institutional
- extinction of animals within historical times
- agrarian history

== Death ==
Nicholls died at Bantry General Hospital on 25 May 2025, at the age of 90.

== Recognition ==
His work was honoured in the festschrift Regions and rulers in Ireland, 1100-1650: essays for Kenneth Nicholls (David Edwards, editor; Dublin, 2004), which is a collection of essays by several of the leading Irish historians of today.

== Select bibliography ==
=== Articles ===
- Tuath Bailenangeadh (Twoghballyneges etc.) in "Dinnseanchas", 2/3, 1967, p. 89.
- Tobar Finnmhuighe - Slan Padraig, Dinnseanchas, 2/4, 1967, p. 97-98.
- Some placenames from The Red Book of the Earls of Kildare, Dinnseanchas, 3/2, (1968), p. 25-37.
- The descendants of Oliver FitzGerald of Belagh, in The Irish Genealogist, 4/1 (1968), p. 2-9.
- The Lisgoole agreement of 1580, in Clougher Record 7/1 (1969), p. 27-33.
- Some documents on Irish law and custom in the sixteenth century, in Analaecta Hibernica, #26, (1970), pp. 27–33.
- The Kavanaghs, 1400-1700 (I), in The Irish Genealogist, 5/4, (Nov 1977), pp. 435–47.
- The Kavanaghs, 1400-1700 (II), in The Irish Genealogist, 5/5, (Nov 1978), pp. 573–80.
- The Kavanaghs, 1400-1700 (III), in The Irish Genealogist, 5/6, (Nov 1979), pp. 730–334.
- The Kavanaghs, 1400-1700 (VI), in The Irish Genealogist, 6/2, (Nov 1981), pp. 189–203.
- Kinelmeaky and the Munster Plantation, in O'Mahony Journal, 10 (1980), p. 10-14.
- Notes on the genealogy of Clann Eoin Mhoir, in West Highland Notes and Queries, 1991, p. 11-24.
- Richard Tyrell, Soldier Extraordinary, in The Battle of Kinsale, ed. Hiram Morgan, pp. 160–78, Dublin, 2004.

=== Books ===
- Gaelic and Gaelicised Ireland in the Middle Ages, Gill History of Ireland 4, Dublin, 1972; revised and reprinted by Lilliput Press, Dublin, 2003.
- The O'Doyne (Ó Duinn) Manuscript, Irish Historical Manuscripts Commission, Dublin, 1985.
